= Jacob Wexler =

Israeli artist and art teacher (1912–1995)

Jacob (Yaacov) Wexler יעקב וכסלר
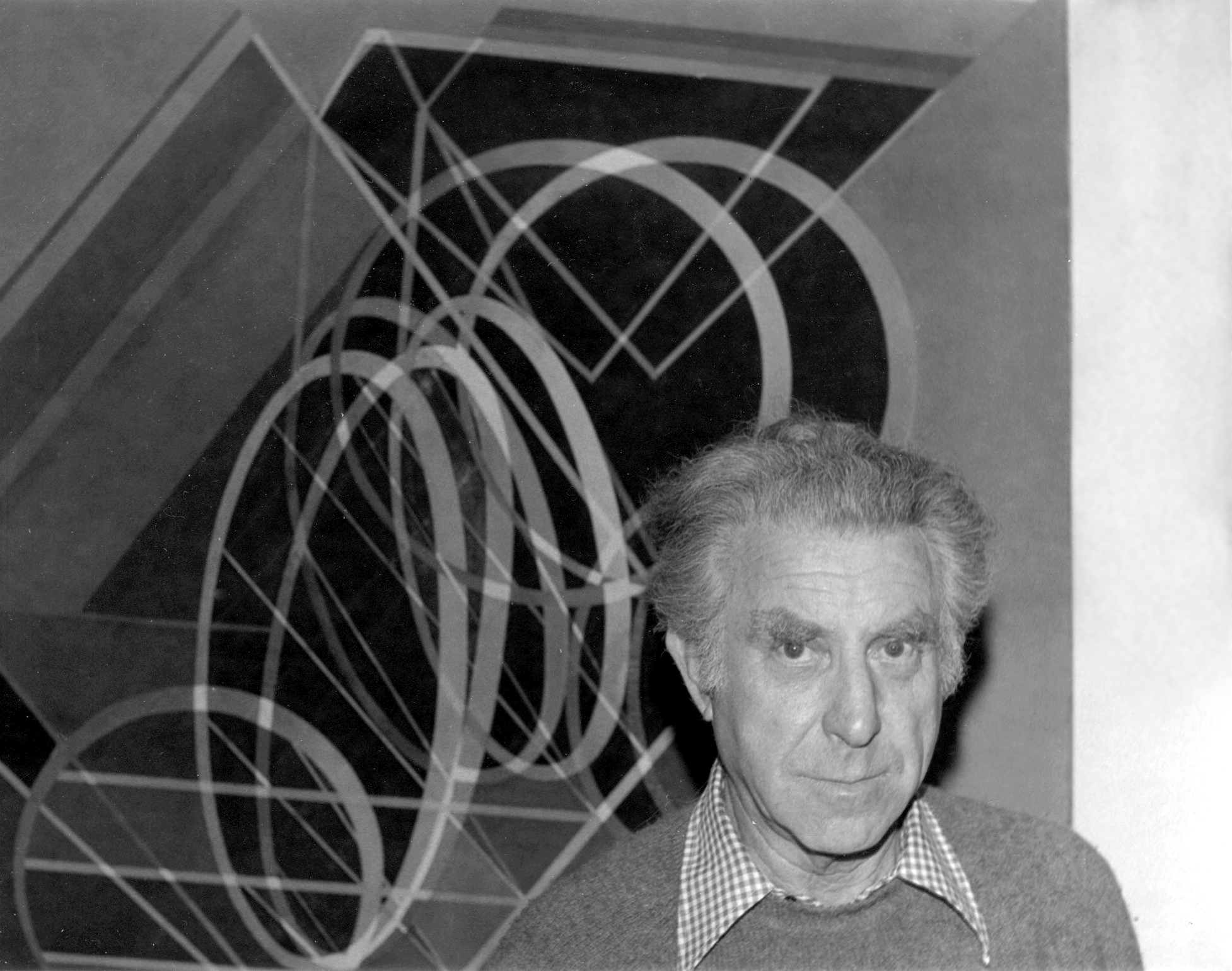
- Jacob Wexler, 1978
- Born: November 15, 1912; Liepaja, Russian Empire
- Died: March 21, 1995; Ramat Gan, Israel
- Education: Landeskunstschule Hamburg
- Known for: Painting
- Movement: Israeli art, Ofakim Hadashim

Jacob Wexler (German: Jakob Wechsler, Hebrew: יעקב וכסלר; 15 November 1912 – 21 March 1995) was an Israeli artist and art teacher. He was one of the founders of the Ofakim Hadashim art movement.

His artistic endeavors are replete with stylistic shifts, from figurative to abstract, and back to figurative, yet the point of departure was always structural: "You will always be all right when you are all right with your shapes. The color – that will come into the painting in any case. Every shape belongs to another shape, and another shape, and another, and together all the shapes create the structure of the painting. It is the structure that influences, not because this is the sky, or a house, or a figure, but because it creates a tension of form, and that is what creates the atmosphere."

== Early life ==
Jacob Wexler was born in Liepāja (German: Libau), Latvia. His parents were members of the Jewish Labour Bund. His father, Tuvia, was an accountant, and his mother, Sonia (Sarah-Sheina née Krupnik), was a seamstress. In addition to Jacob, they had three more children, Avraham, Esther, and Meir. In 1923, the family relocated to Germany, and Tuvia Wexler enrolled in the Faculty of Mathematics at the University of Hamburg. The children attended Jewish schools in the city. The family had to live frugally, and in 1926, Tuvia was forced to stop his studies. He became religiously observant, and the Wexler household became religious. Jacob, who was a member of the Jewish-Socialist youth movement HeHalutz, refused to cooperate with the change.

In 1930, despite his father's objections, Wexler began studying at the University of Fine Arts of Hamburg, where he was introduced to twentieth-century art, especially German Expressionism. In March 1933, following the Nazi Party's rise to power, he was forced to abandon his studies. In April 1935, he married Annie Roch. In the summer of 1935, the couple arrived in Palestine and joined Kibbutz Ein HaHoresh.

== Art career ==
While waiting for a permit to immigrate to Palestine, Wexler drew a large series of erotic illustrations for texts by the French Renaissance poet François Villon and the German playwright Bertolt Brecht. His first exhibition was at the HeHalutz clubhouse in Hamburg in July 1935, from which only a few prints survived, most of which depict figures of musicians, acrobats, and clowns.

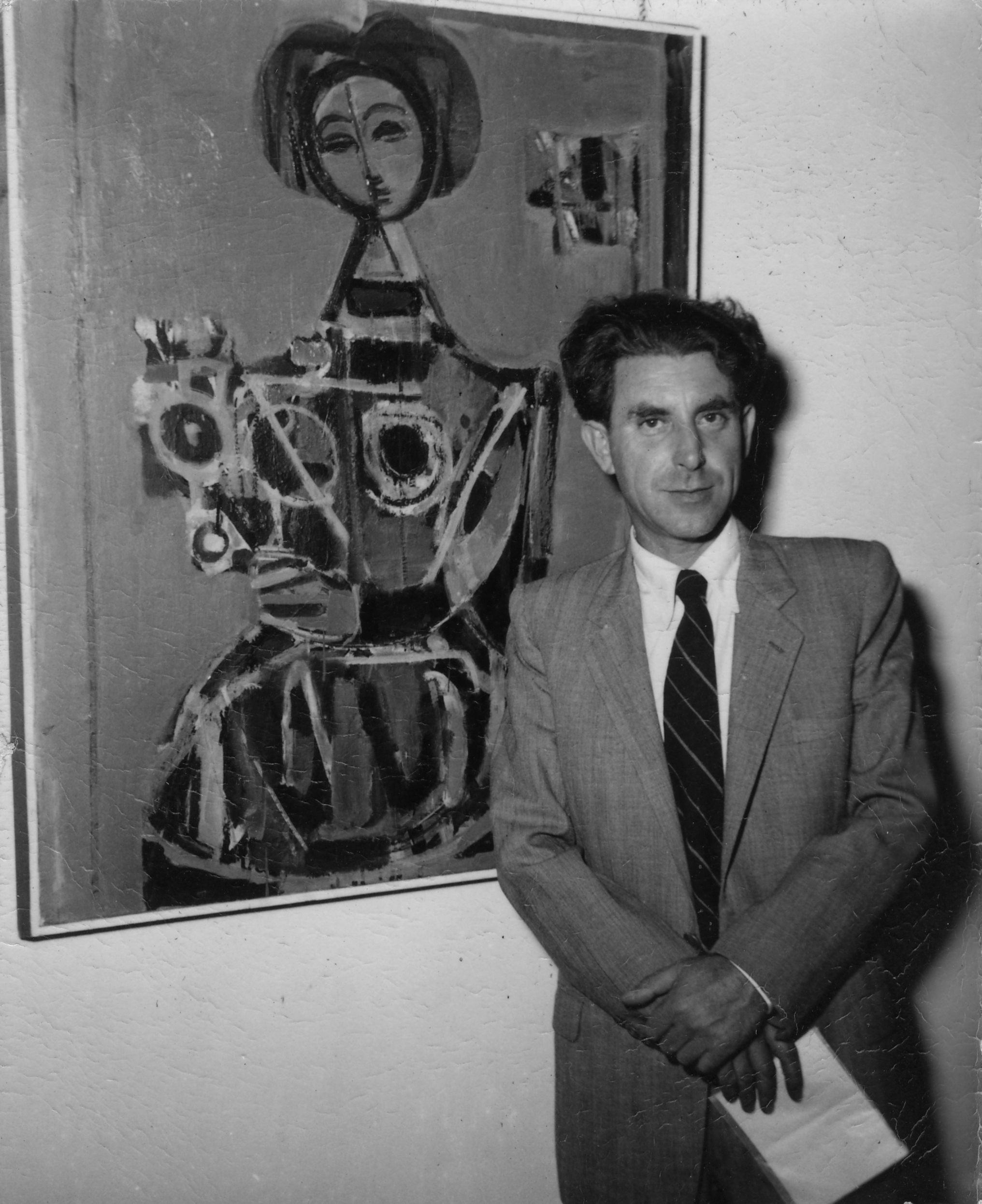
Wexler at the opening of his exhibition at the Tel Aviv Museum, 1954. Photo: Israel Zafrir.

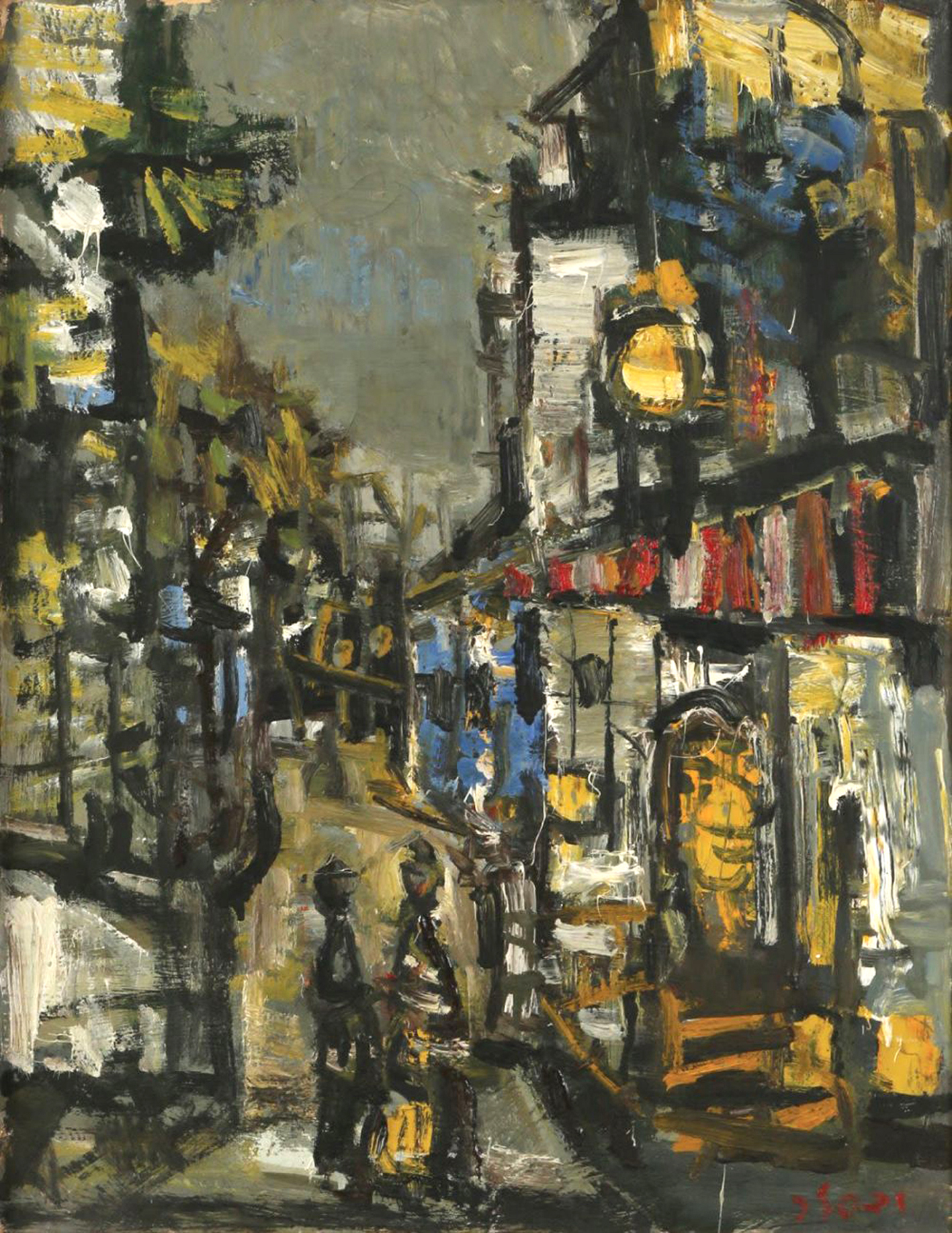
Street Scene, 1943. Oil on canvas, 62X47 cm

Wexler was asked to create engagé art, but found it difficult to cooperate with the demands of the movement. "I don’t have an ideology. Painting is not an ideology. In a way, if you want to say something beyond the painting, when you want to convey a message of some kind, it falsifies the painting – unless it is very human and really touches me."

Two years later, Wexler and his wife relocated to Haifa, and later separated. In Haifa, Wexler befriended painters Zvi Meirowitch, Menachem Shemi, and Avraham Naton, and participated in several group exhibitions. During this period, Wexler was introduced to the work of French painter Georges Rouault, and was influenced by it. However, it was only in 1943, during a visit to the Yemin Moshe neighborhood in Jerusalem, that a breakthrough occurred in his work. "What I found there was a kind of shape and structure. There’s a kind of picturesqueness there. […] It was like a deep breath, suddenly there was air… Now I was painting like a madman – hundreds of paintings." In 1944, Wexler joined the Israel Painters and Sculptors Association, and began showing his work in the association's exhibitions. His first solo exhibition in Palestine opened in 1946 at the Jonas Gallery in Jerusalem. "The subjects of Mr. Wechsler's paintings are mostly taken from the Palestinian landscape, especially from the North: Haifa, Acre, and Safed. But the subjects are just so many labels; neither the shapes nor colors are more than vaguely indicative of the real subjects. These pictures are a kind of symphonic transcription of reality into spheres of artistic imagination. Strong and independent enough not to follow any of the 'isms.' A great but disciplined passion for his work is manifest in Mr. Wechsler's paintings."

== From Figurative to Abstract ==
On 2 May 1948, about two weeks before the declaration on the establishment of the State of Israel, a solo exhibition of Wexler's work opened at Tel Aviv Museum of Art, exhibiting 34 of his works. In the exhibition catalogue, museum director Dr. Haim Gamzu wrote: "Wexler is a gifted artist. His glowing colors suggest a mosaic, where small pieces of stone set in one general frame form, in their right combination, a foundation for a single whole. These works present a rich range of colors and a collection of splendid sketches for pictures in which the painter merges his artistic vision with a maturity of execution, and curbs his tempestuous temperament by the reconciliation of form and subject." Wexler was one of the founders of "Ofakim Hadashim" (New Horizons). The gradual shift from figurative painting to abstract, as reflected in the exhibitions mounted by members of the group throughout this period, is also evident in Wexler's work. The expressive approach that typified him in the 1940s, gradually became more restrained, in form and color alike, "Wexler is a New Horizons man, and his horizons are truly new. He is an abstract painter, but the object always constitutes the point of departure. […] Wexler employs a clean, clear line. The colorful surfaces in his paintings are clean, and the seams between the splashes of color are not blurred. He likes contrast. […] Wexler maintains that in his paintings 'form is the static element, and color is the dynamic element. The form is the subject, while the colors create the atmosphere in the painting.'"

== Action Painting ==
In 1955, Wexler traveled to Paris, where he participated in the Salon d’Automne with a solo exhibition at Galerie Lara Vinci. His encounters with French Art Informel painters such as Nicolas de Staël, Pierre Soulages, and Georges Mathieu, were a source of inspiration for yet another change in his work, toward abstract painting, which was evident in his solo exhibition at the Haifa Museum of Art in 1959. Wexler summed up the transition from figurative to abstract painting thus: "Once I came to see that the shape is a shape and not a woman or a flower, or any other shape in the natural world, I knew I’d arrived at the abstract. […] This is the only moment I can say I left something safe and certain, and ventured into the unknown."

Wexler's painting style gradually developed in the direction of monochromatic action painting, and was shown for the first time in a solo exhibition mounted at the Israel Gallery in Tel Aviv in May 1961. Art critic Yoav Bar El described the principle of movement underlying Wexler's artistic outlook: "In his paintings, Wexler creates a three-dimensional space into which movements are interwoven, in a warp and weft composition [...] This is not, in fact, an additional element in Wexler's paintings, but rather a clearer emphasis of an element that was already there. This application of material also serves as a parallel solution to the problem of color. The material can also serve instead of color, and gains full expression especially when it appears in monochrome. In Wexler's paintings, which are all monochromatic black and white, the material fulfills both a textural and a color function."

== Op Art ==
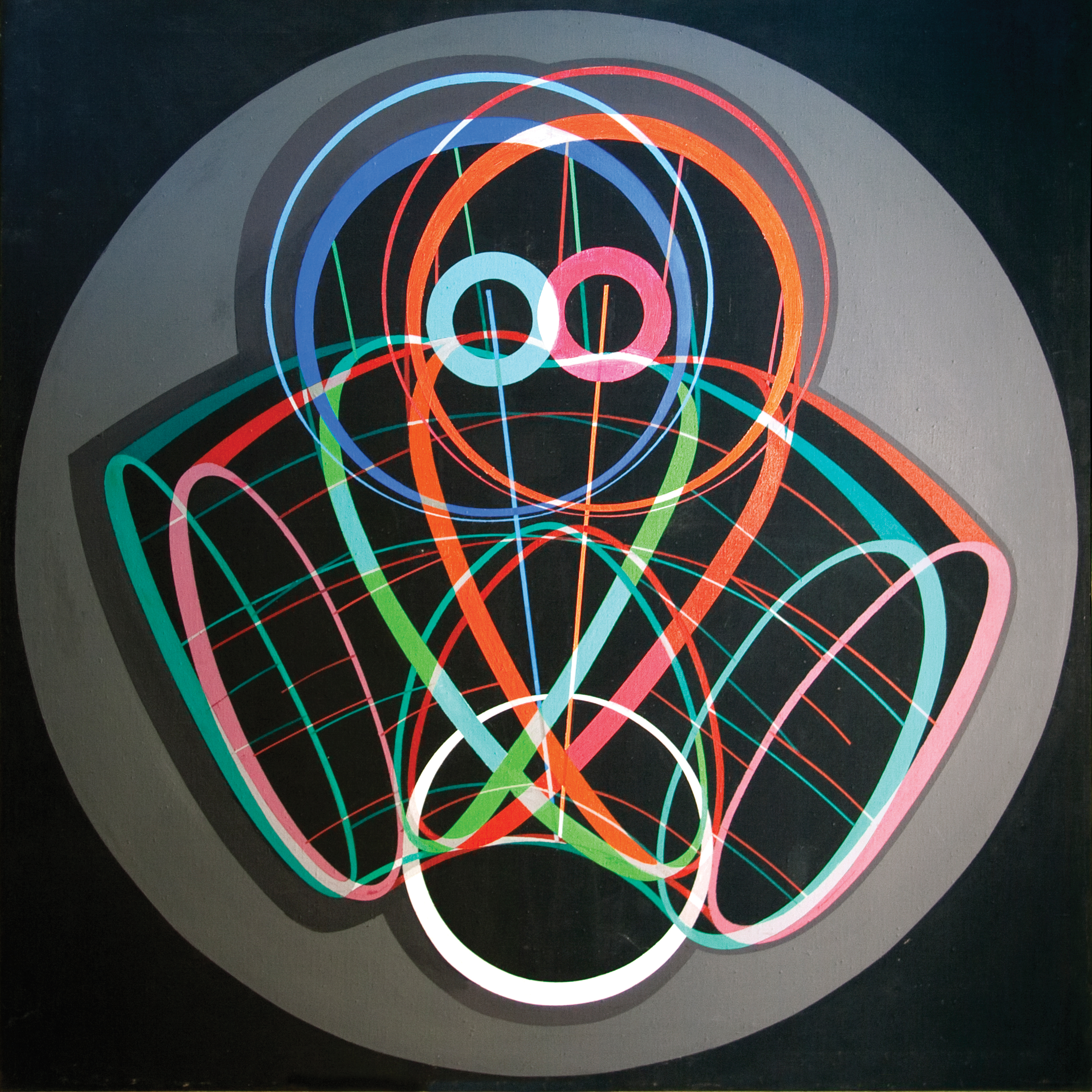
Torso, 1968. Acrylic on canvas, 130x130 cm

In 1966, Wexler began incorporating geometric elements into the free structure, which gradually became more restrained and rationalistic. From his familiarity and identification with Op Art style, he began using anaglyphs in his paintings – geometric structures that become three-dimensional and dynamic when viewed through red-green glasses. "Sometimes it seems to me that there are two painters struggling within me. One is very impulsive, painting the inspiration of the moment. The other is calculated, deliberate, he builds and experiments. Three or four years ago, I once again ran out of impulsive breath. I remembered the stereoscopic idea, which had long since appealed to me." In July 1969, Wexler showed 58 of his works in Tel Aviv Museum of Art: "For anyone who knows Wexler, this exhibition will come as no surprise. We know him as a 'seeking' artist who embodies two characteristics – the expressive characteristic, and the characteristic of pure common sense. [...] This time, the constructive approach is starting to dominate. This mandates extensive knowledge, a vivid imagination, and the curiosity of a researcher, all of which have merged here. In these works, Wexler has achieved a concentrated essence, constructive building that possesses immense imagination and colorfulness. [...] The painting is built on foundations of perspective, and becomes a body extending from the canvas to the viewer. Changing the angle of observation, changes the angles and the length of the shapes, creating the impression of movement." In the early 1970s, Wexler exhausted the idea of anaglyphs, and his paintings were now reminiscent of geometric landscapes. Fifteen such landscapes were shown at Julie M. Gallery in Tel Aviv in April 1977. "Wexler returns to landscapes. […] [The] artist subjugates those abstract 'spatial' constructions to new graphic combinations that depict urban landscapes: intersecting structures of bridges, streaking highway junctions. [...] His returning to landscapes breaks the pure spatial constructiveness of his previous canvases."

== Late Figurative Period ==
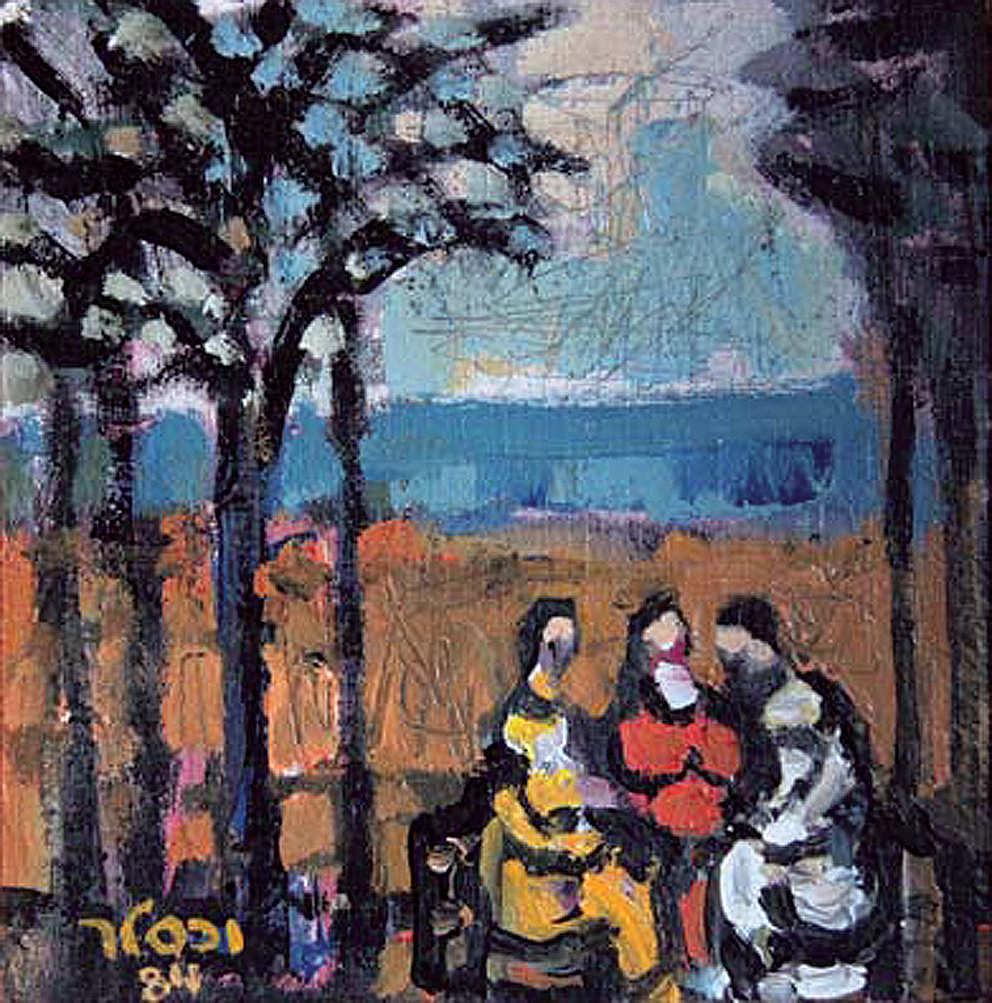
Figures in a Landscape, 1984. Acrylic on canvas, 27x27 cm

Wexler never abandoned figurative painting, which is evident in the dozens of commissioned works, wall paintings and mosaics, carpets, and book illustrations he created throughout his artistic career. In September 1984, Wexler created a series of serigraphs, to which he added an introductory text: “I have been painting these pages recently. I took the atmosphere and the subjects from shapes and colors, and things I had in memory, embroidered from pictures I have been living in, pictures belonging to a week-day and to a feast-day, to a house and to a street, and to man, to a tree and to the sea, to near and to far. Things of the past I loved very much. But I took a distance and discovered other means of expression which occupied, disturbed, and enthused me too. But after some time, this course closed up. And those pictures reappeared. [...] House windows like eyes looking out and seeing everything. Doors open and reveal something of the secrets behind them. People emerge from the darkness towards the sun, and it seems that everything belongs to them. People have many faces, but they hide them behind masks and do not show their involvement. [...] Even behind the frozen face of a clown, it is hard to discover joy and laughter, pain and tears. And so, those things came back, and, it seems, they became clearer and deeper, more colored and more full of meaning.”

== "Paintings Not For Sale" ==
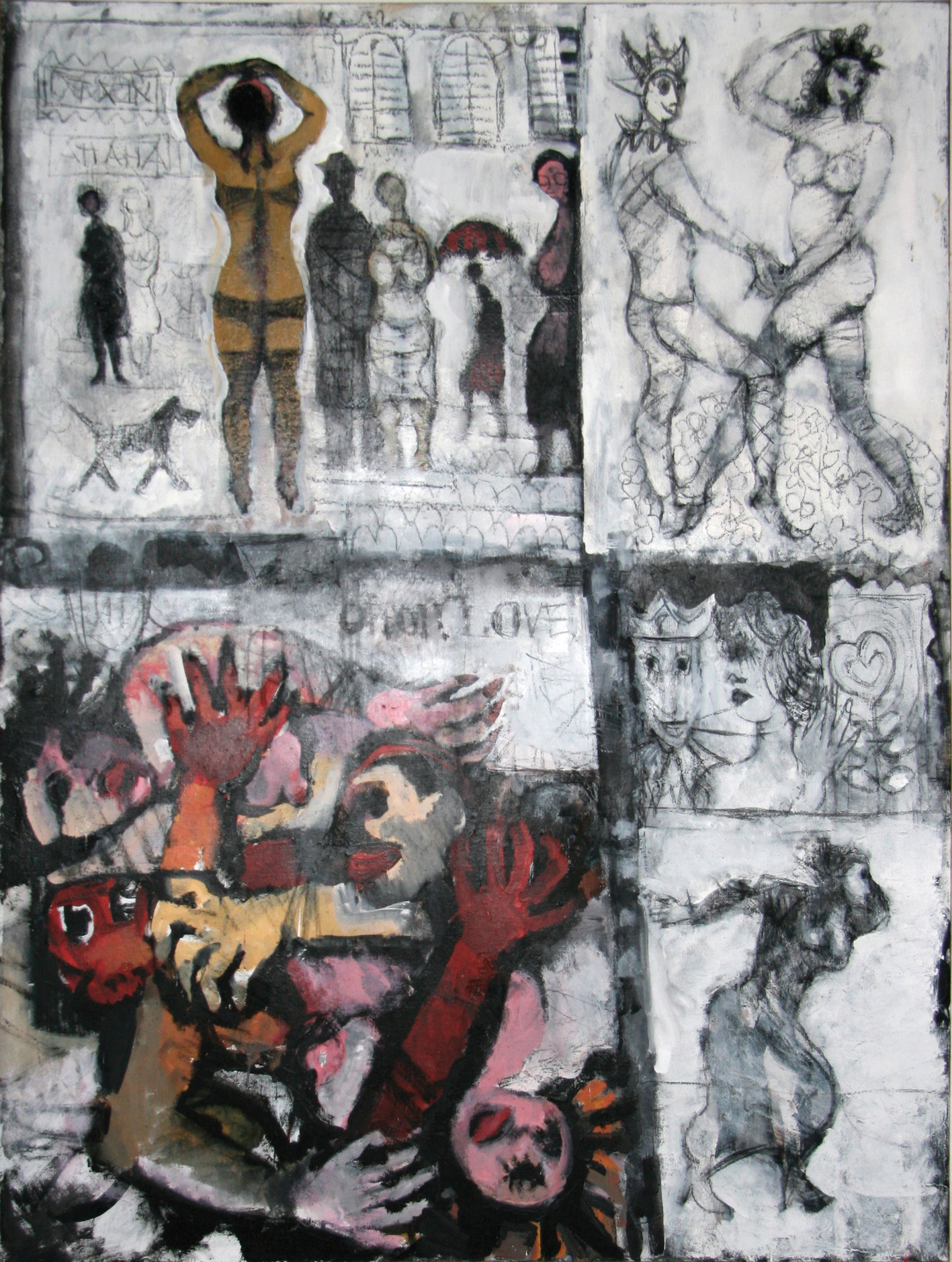
The Studio, 1987. Acrylic and chalk on canvas, 167x126 cm

In February 1989, after a long period in which he did not show his work, an exhibition summarizing the last and most personal stage of his work was mounted at Beit Meirov Gallery in Holon. Wexler called them "Paintings Not For Sale." Many of them incorporated subjects marking the years he spent in Germany – clowns, acrobats, magicians, and prostitutes, alongside quotes from The Threepenny Opera. In her article "Brechtian Circus," critic Dorit Kedar described the recent shift in his work: "The viewer encounters, much to his astonishment, a highly concentrated circus. […] Wexler’s circus is Brechtian […] an admixture of the lightness of sketches and the aggressiveness of splashes of color, skipping between a figurative language and treatment of the canvas, which is absolutely contemporary in its abstract perception."

== Artistic style ==
Wexler is known as a painter who employed multiple styles that gradually developed during his persistent and methodical engagement with articulating values of form. He moves back and forth between the constructivist and the expressionist. At the same time, he also created an iconographic dictionary with autobiographical elements incorporated into it, and which repeatedly emerge in each of his stylistic periods. “I don’t abandon something and jump into something else… the development is somehow gradual, step by step. Sometimes these steps are shorter or longer, but there are always steps. I've already been through many steps. The constructor and expressionist have always dwelled side by side, or one on the heels of the other… You always move toward your schizophrenic friend who's waiting there, that is, the other one… he’s waiting for you in the doorway and looking at you, as if telling you, 'Let him run wild, I’ll be there soon.'"

== Pedagogic career ==
From 1967 to 1982, Wexler headed the Avni Institute of Art and Design in Tel Aviv. As an educator, Wexler positioned logic, rationality, and common sense as the basis for intuition and gut feeling. "The aspiration of an art teacher is to 'attack' two loci in the personality of the student, of the future artist – intellect and emotion. Addressing the intellect is direct and simple. We inculcate knowledge – how to use brushes, how to lay colors. [...] Addressing the non-rational elements making up the student's personality is more complicated. [...] It can be likened to attempting to teach a person to walk straight. We can show him, we can talk about it, but we cannot equip him with a sense of inner balance. He either has it or he doesn't. [...] We endeavor to learn about the student's inner world, and motivate him to do what benefits him, in the right way, using his own volition."

== Gallery ==
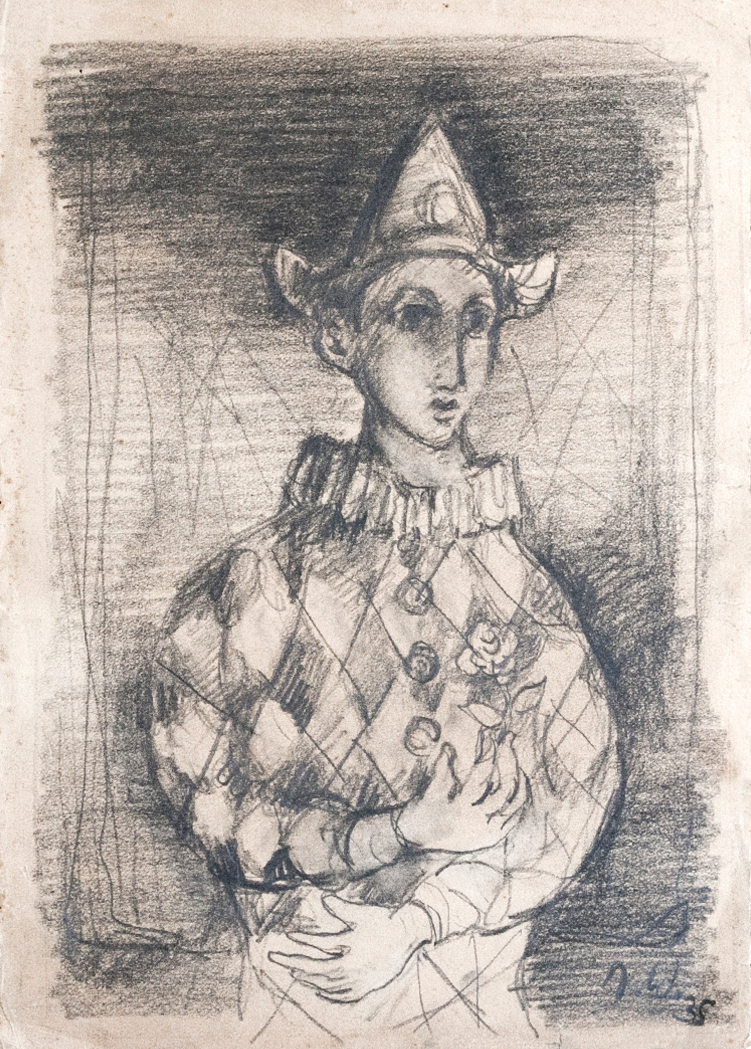
1935, Clown (Pierrot). Pencil drawing, 37x26.5 cm

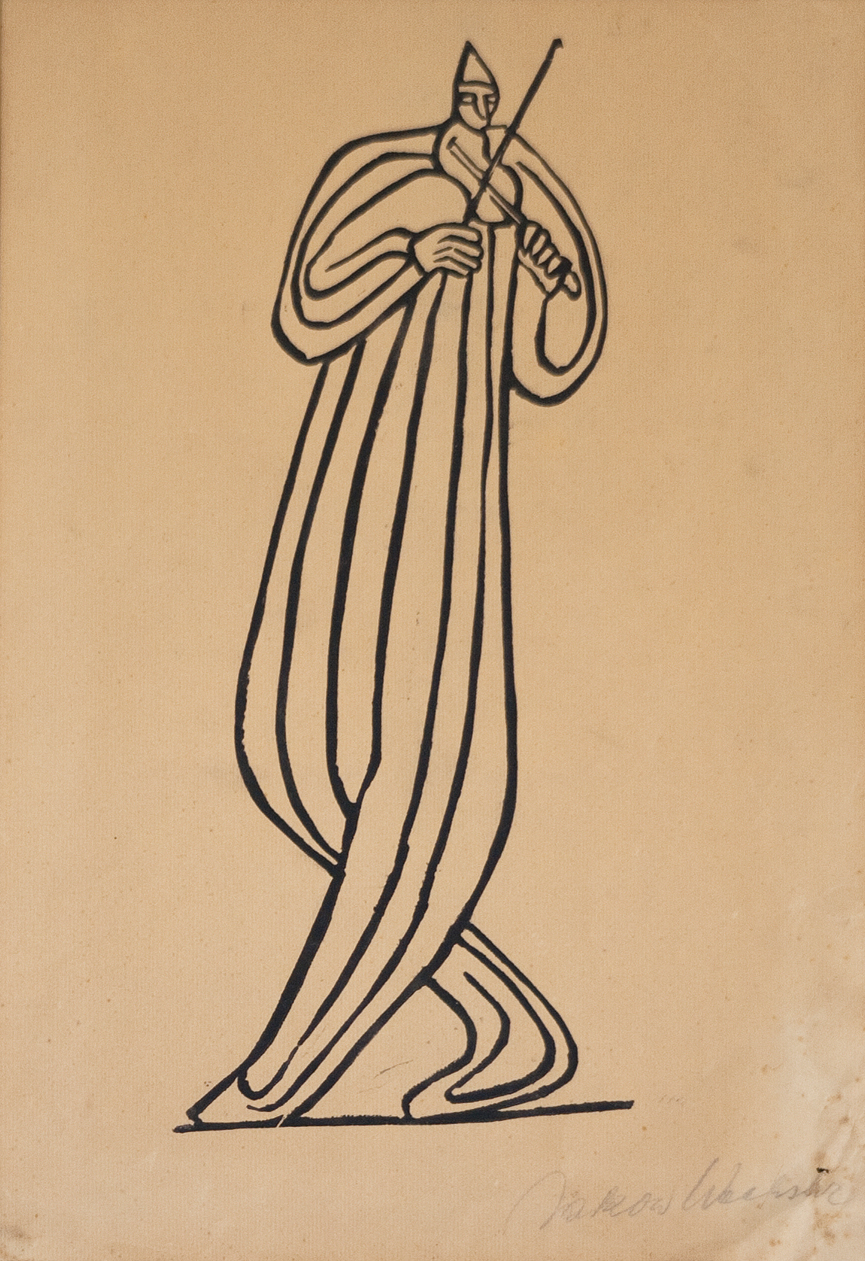
1935, Clown with Violin. Woodcut, 44.5x30.5 cm

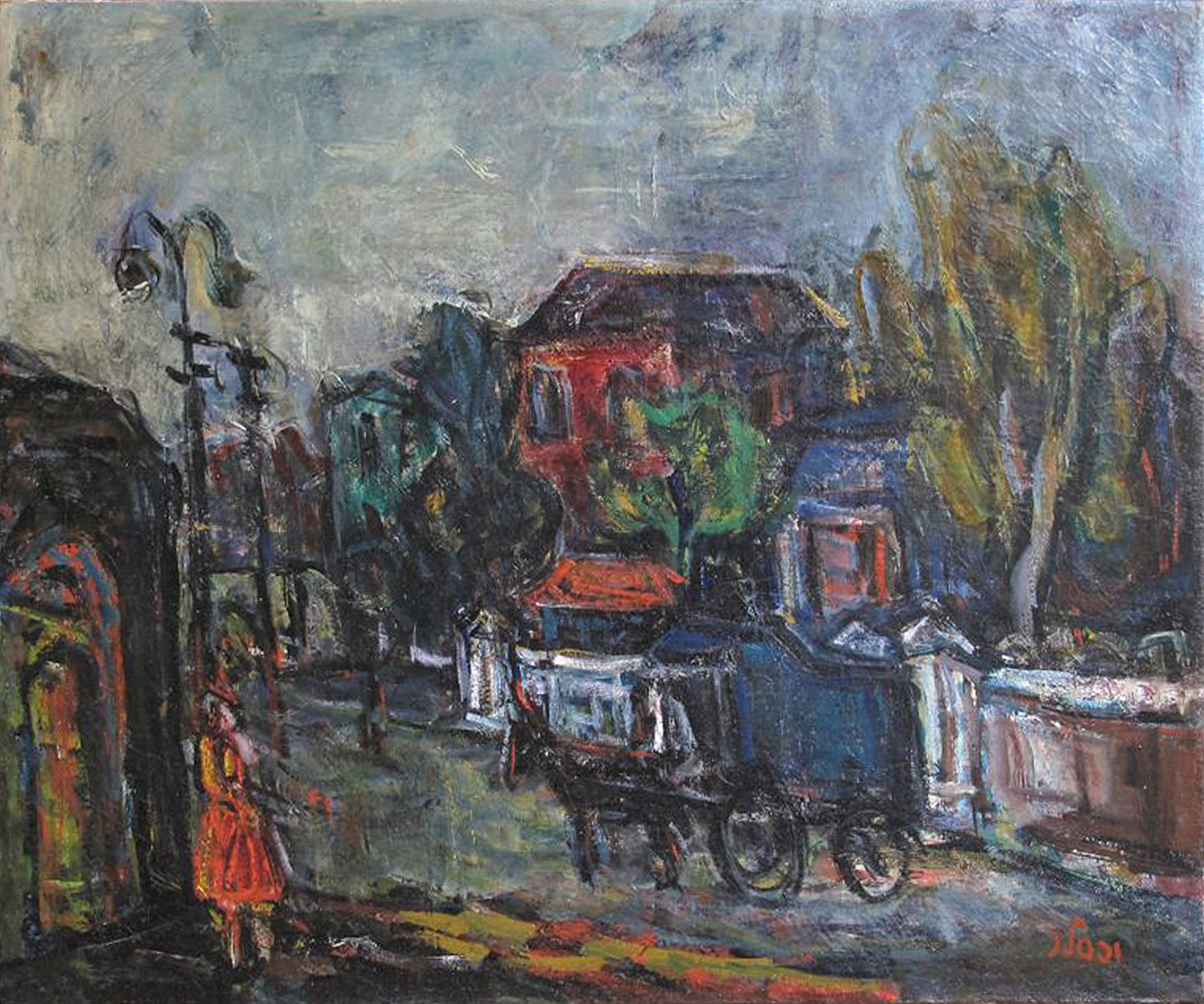
1942, The Red House. Oil on canvas, 64x54 cm

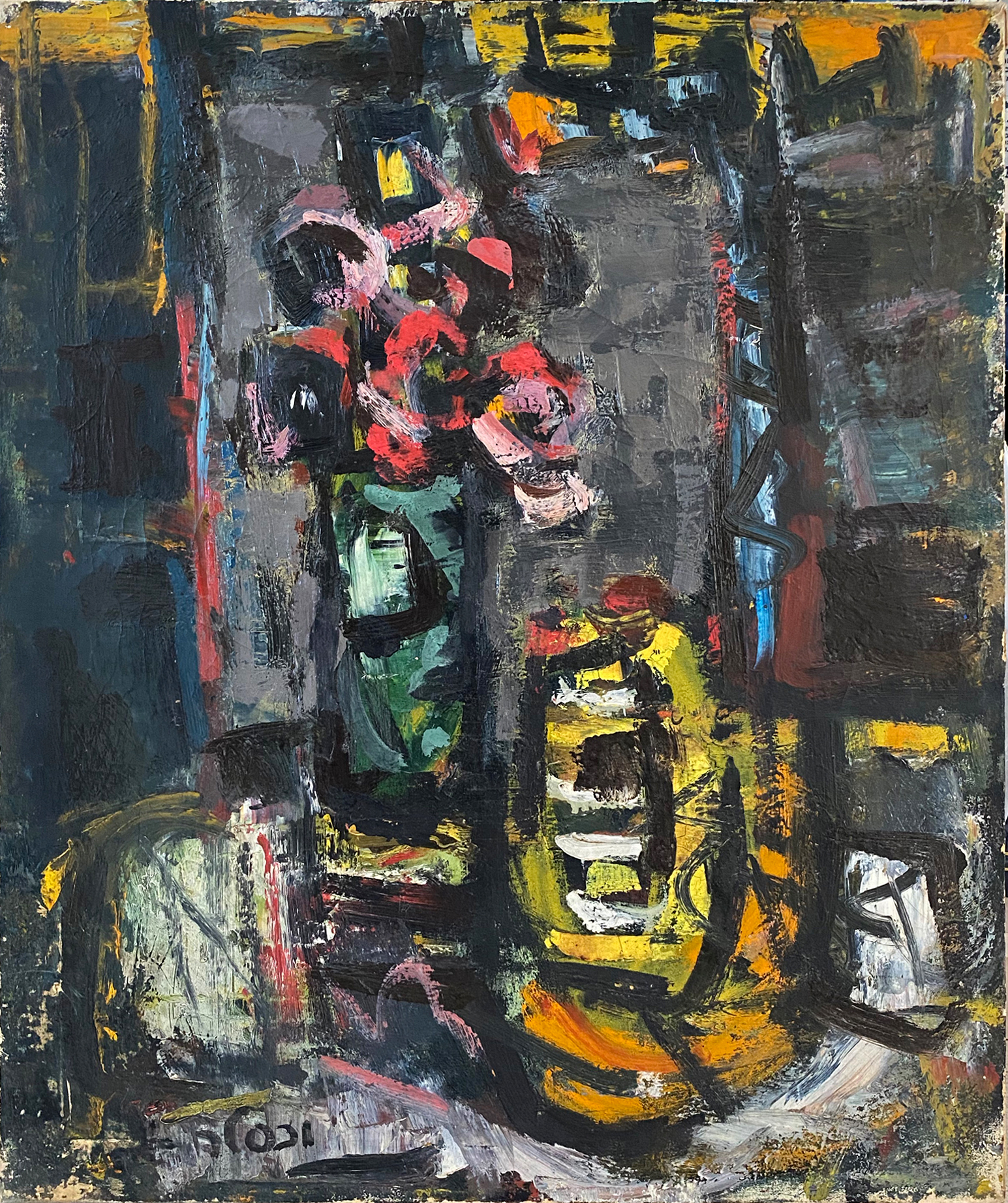
1945, Still Life. Oil on canvas, 65x54 cm

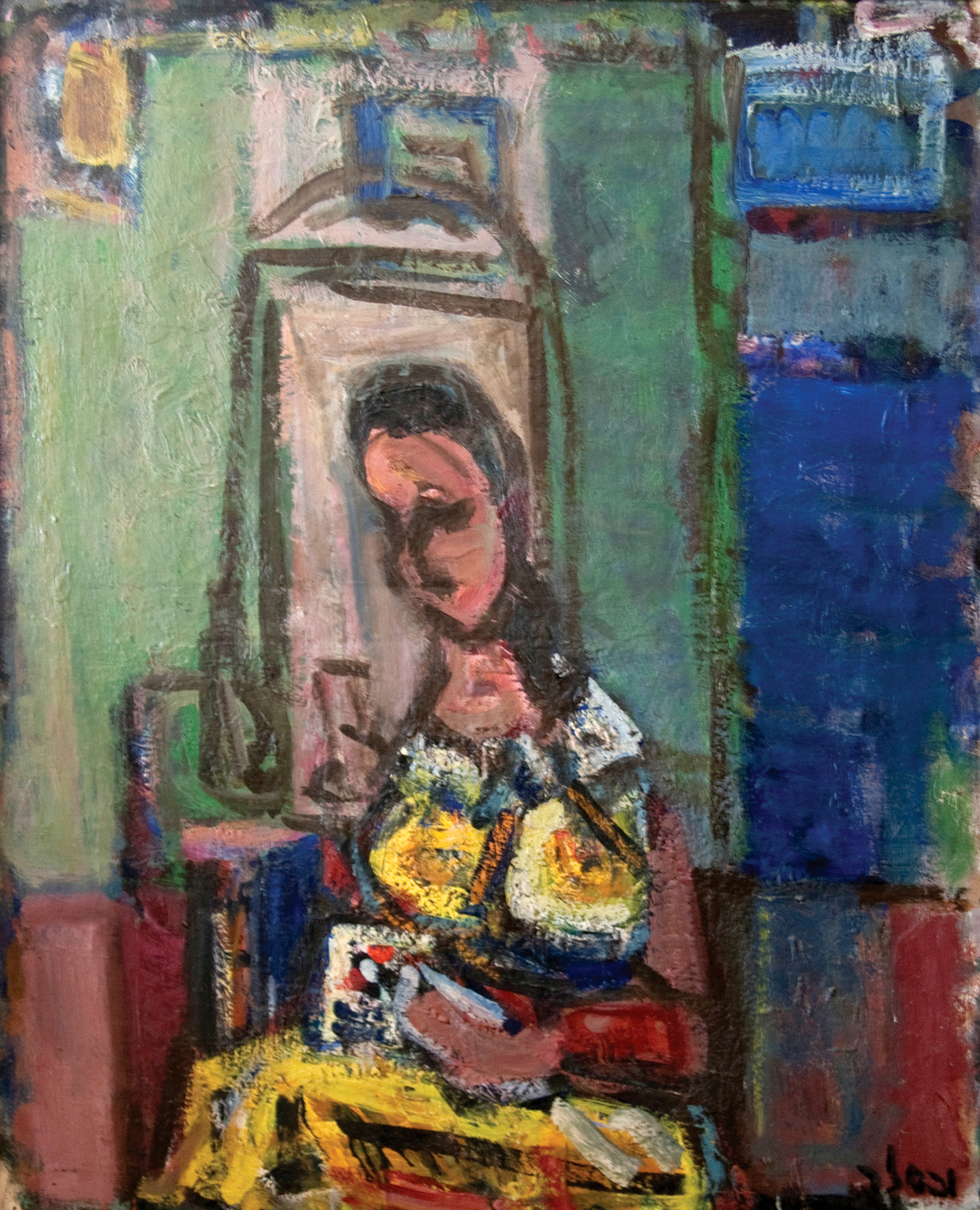
1947, Sitting Woman. Oil on canvas, 100x81 cm

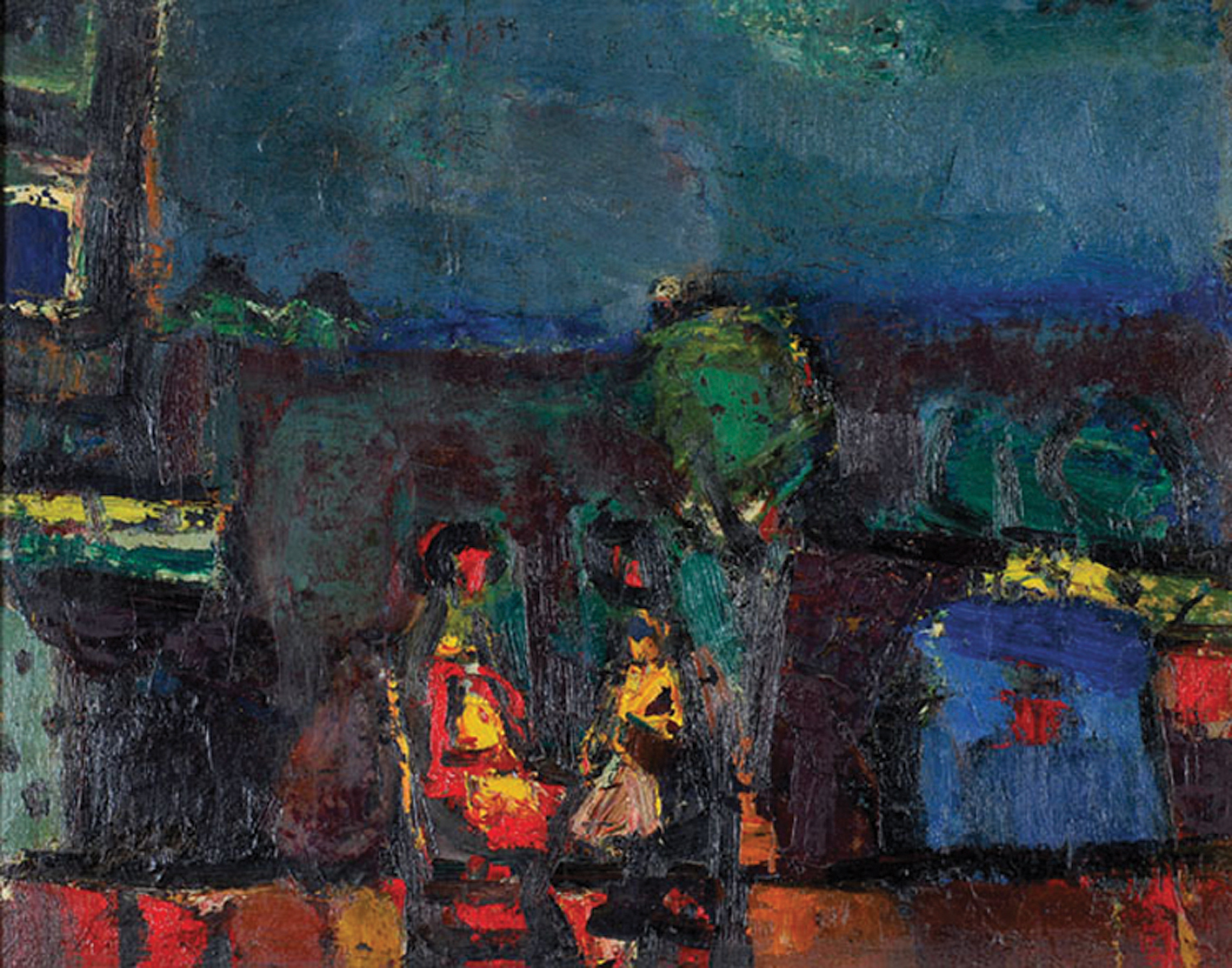
1948, In the Evening. Oil on canvas, 62x50 cm

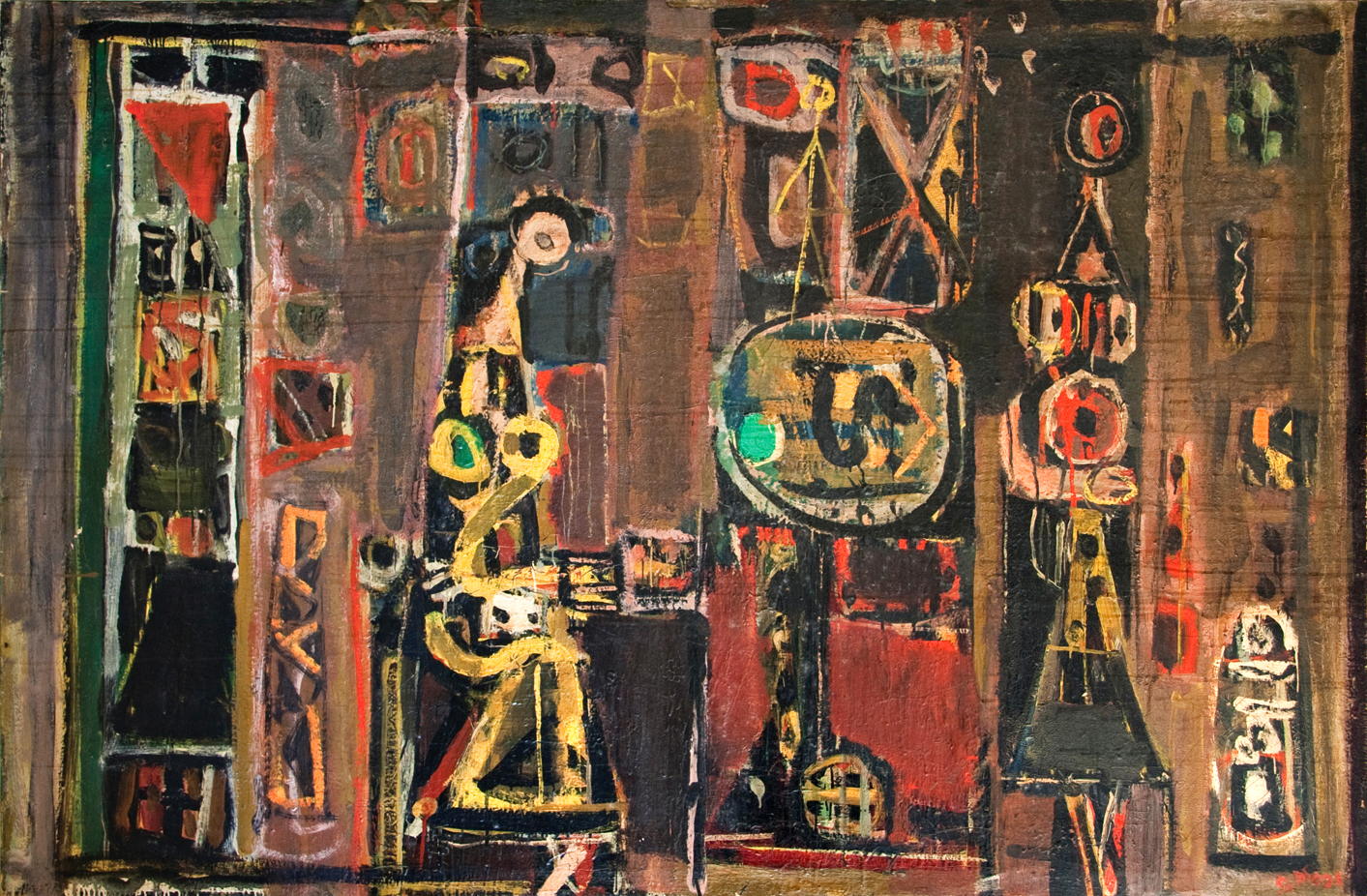
1950, Conversation. Oil on canvas, 193x127 cm

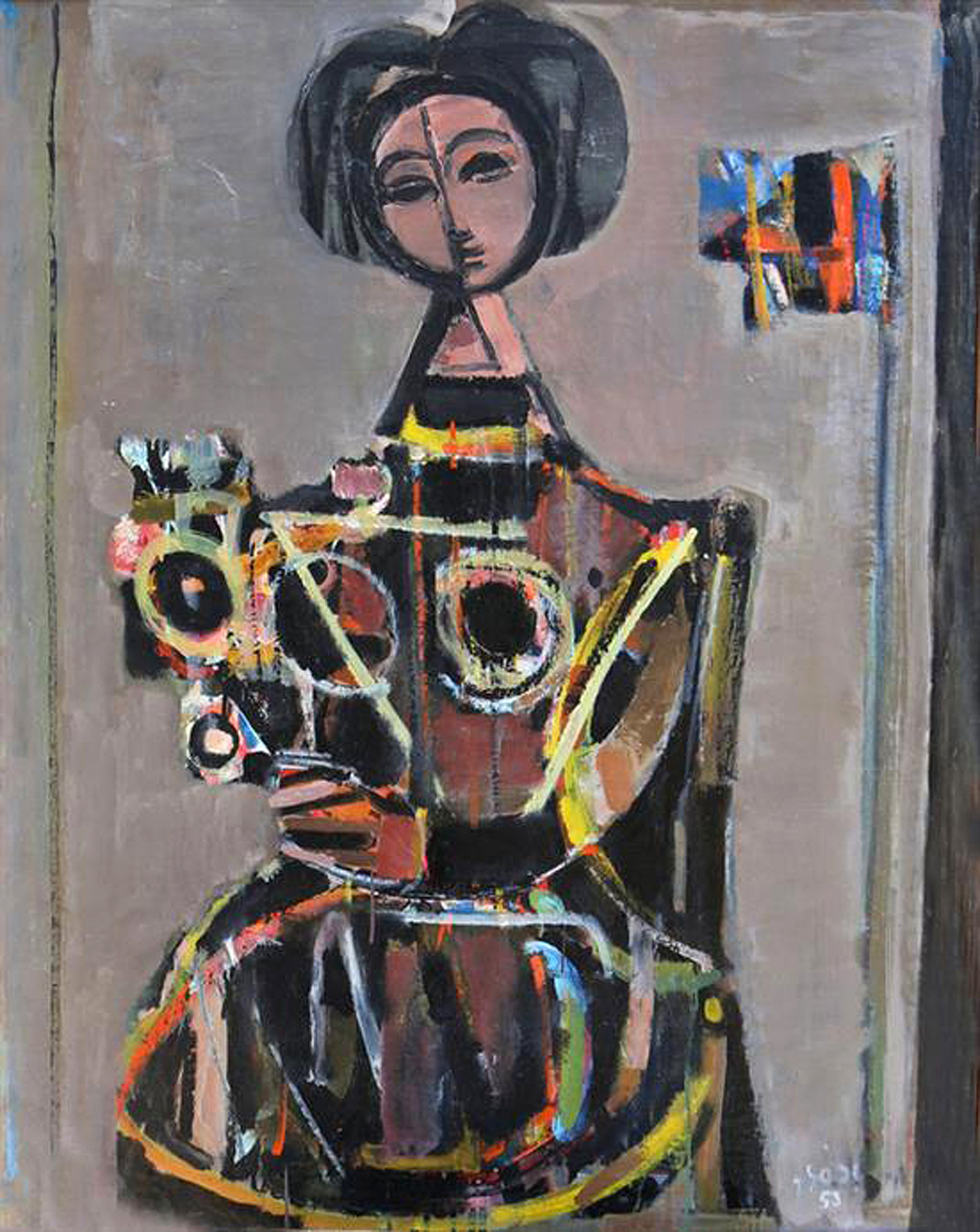
1953,Sitting Woman. Oil on canvas, 100x81 cm

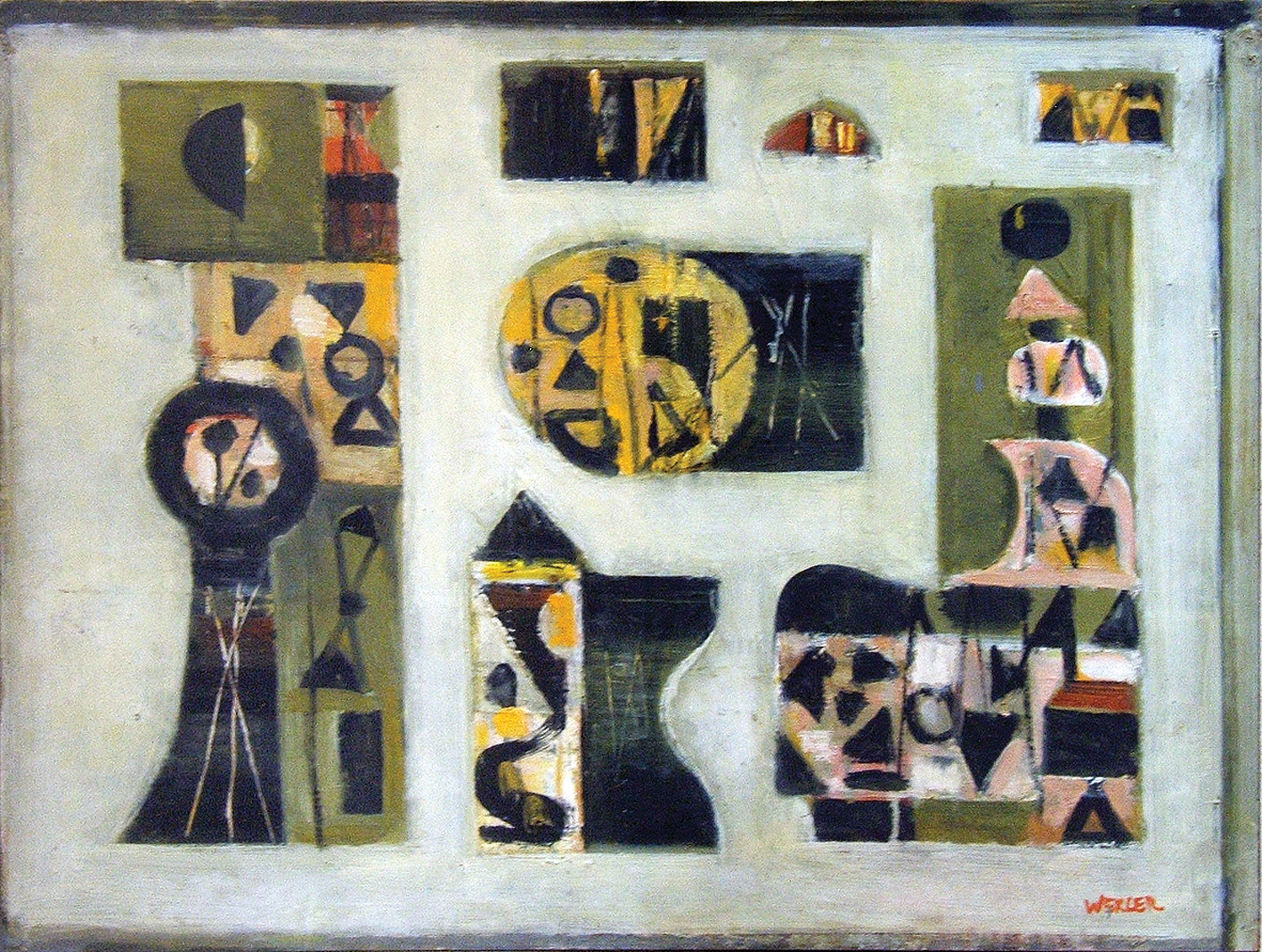
1954, Two Women. Oil on canvas, 42x56 cm

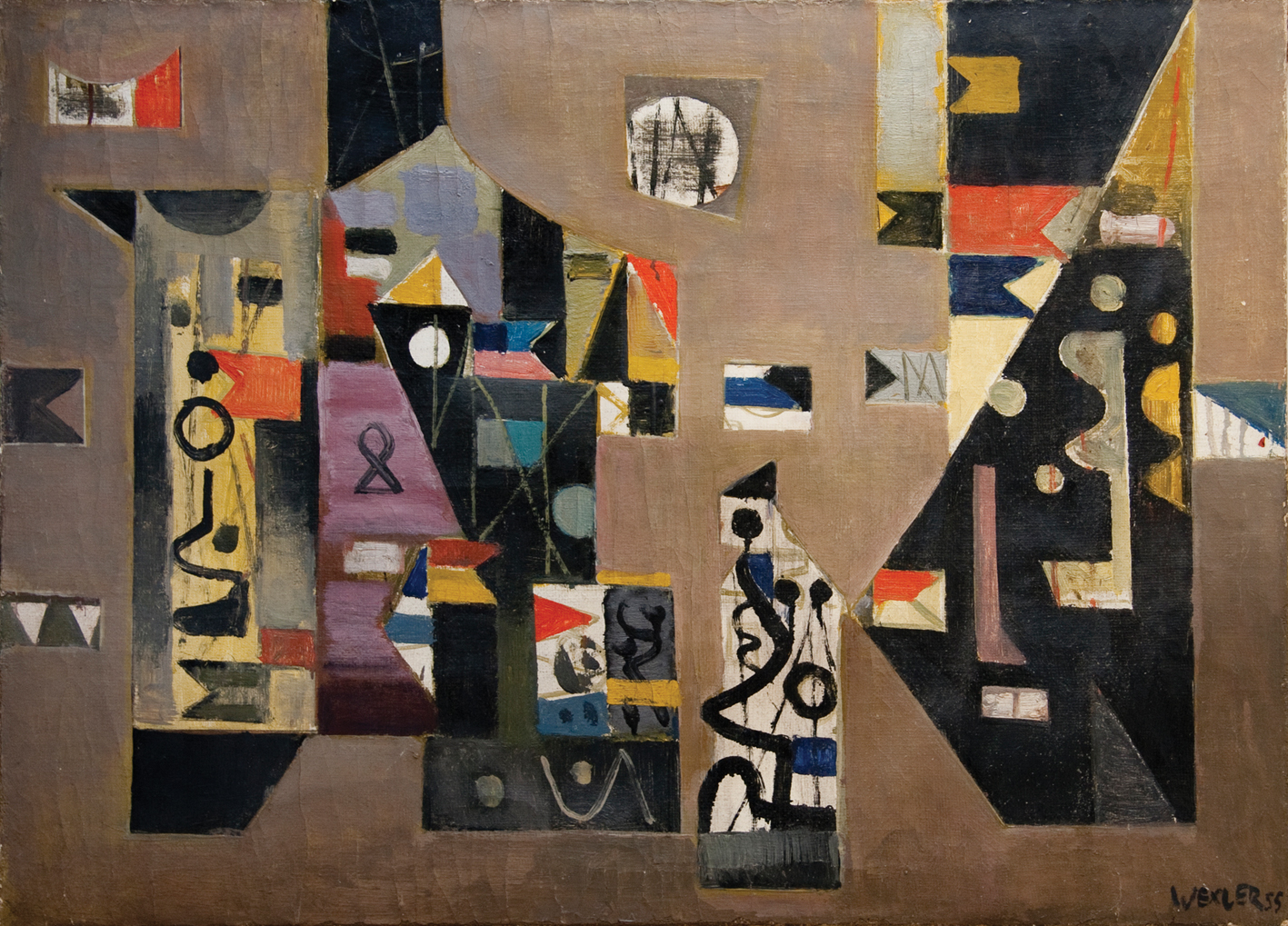
1955, At the Studio. Oil on canvas, 69x96 cm

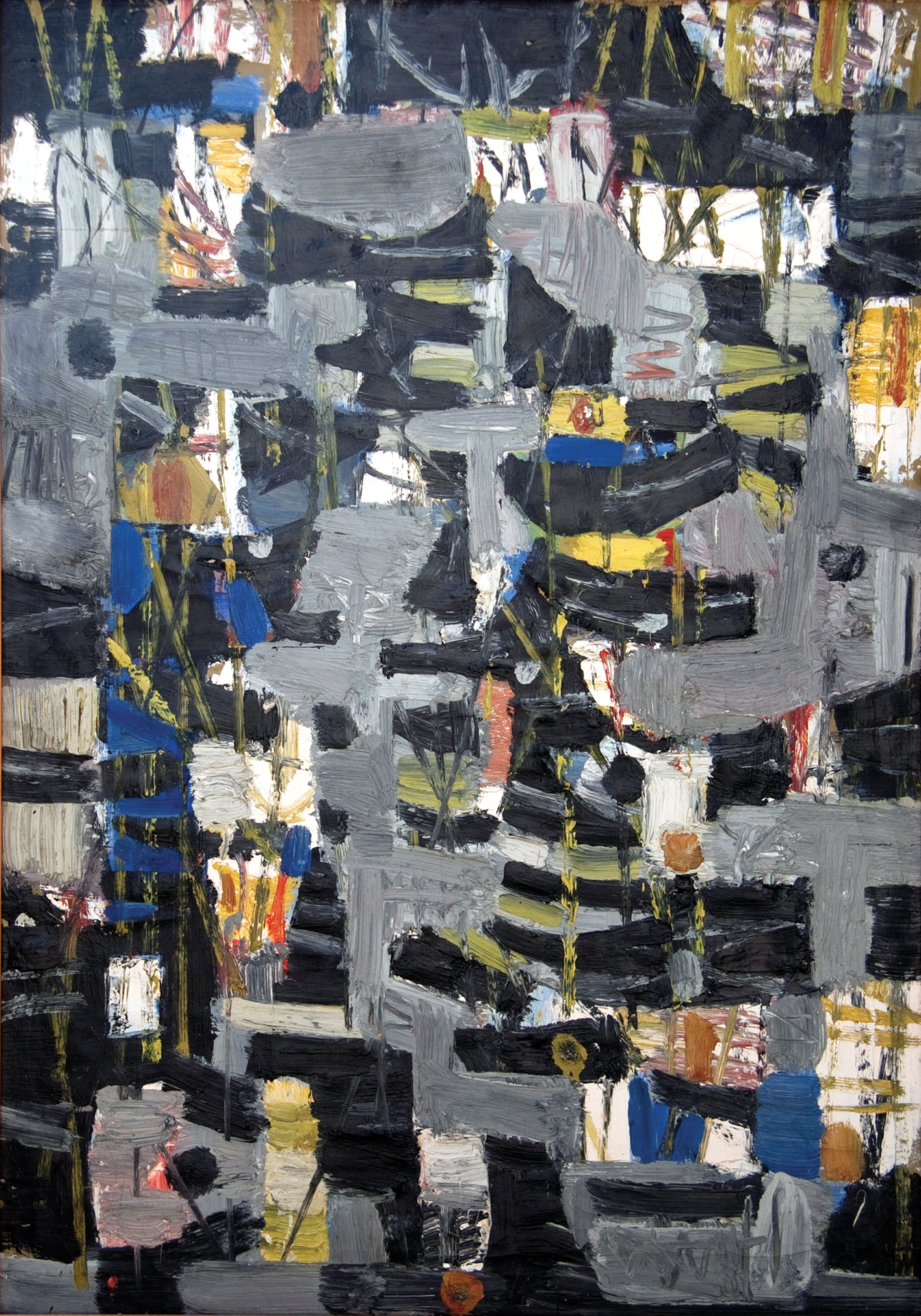
1956, Horizontal Movement. Oil on canvas, 90x63 cm

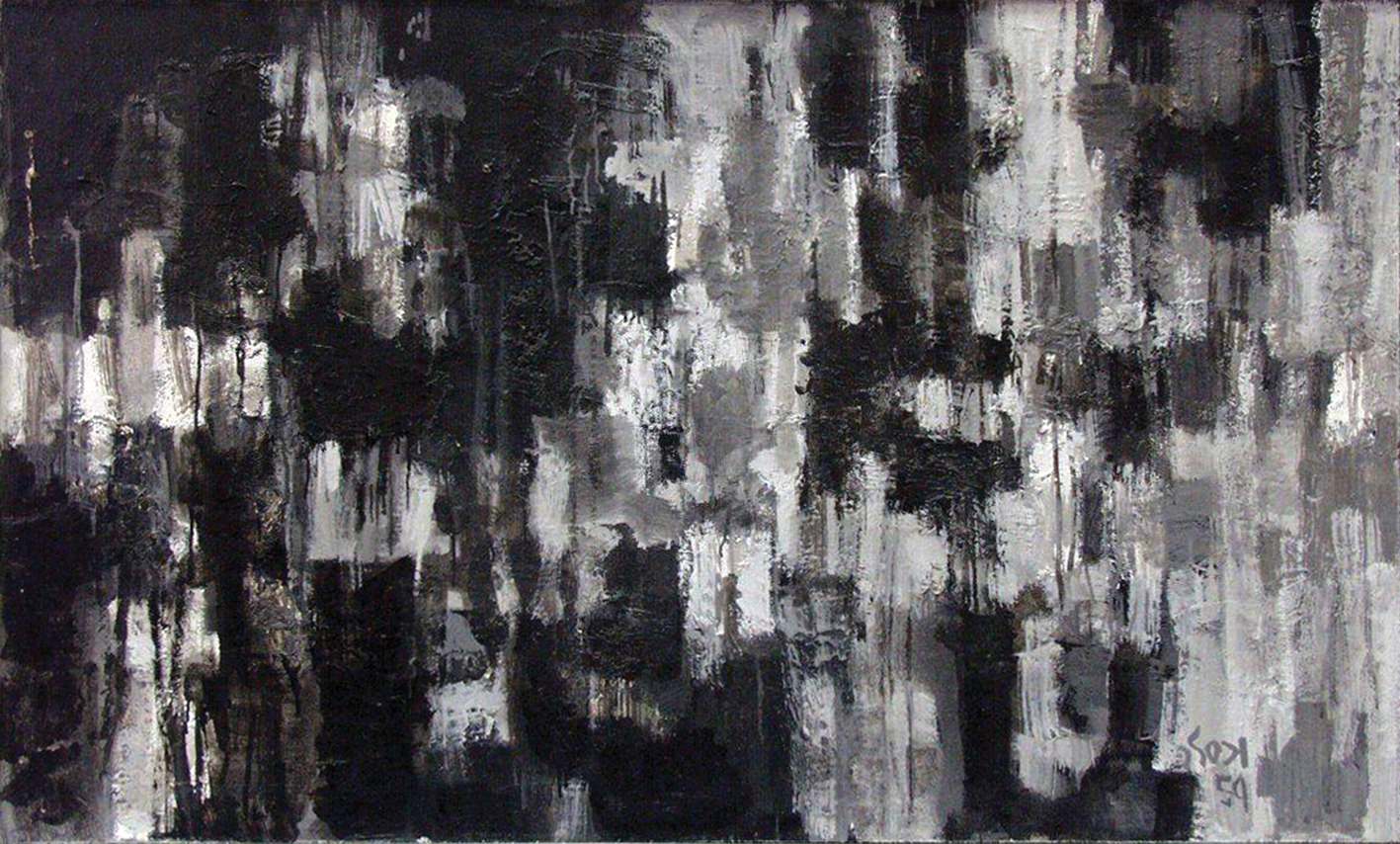
1959, Light and Shadow. Oil on canvas, 73x92 cm

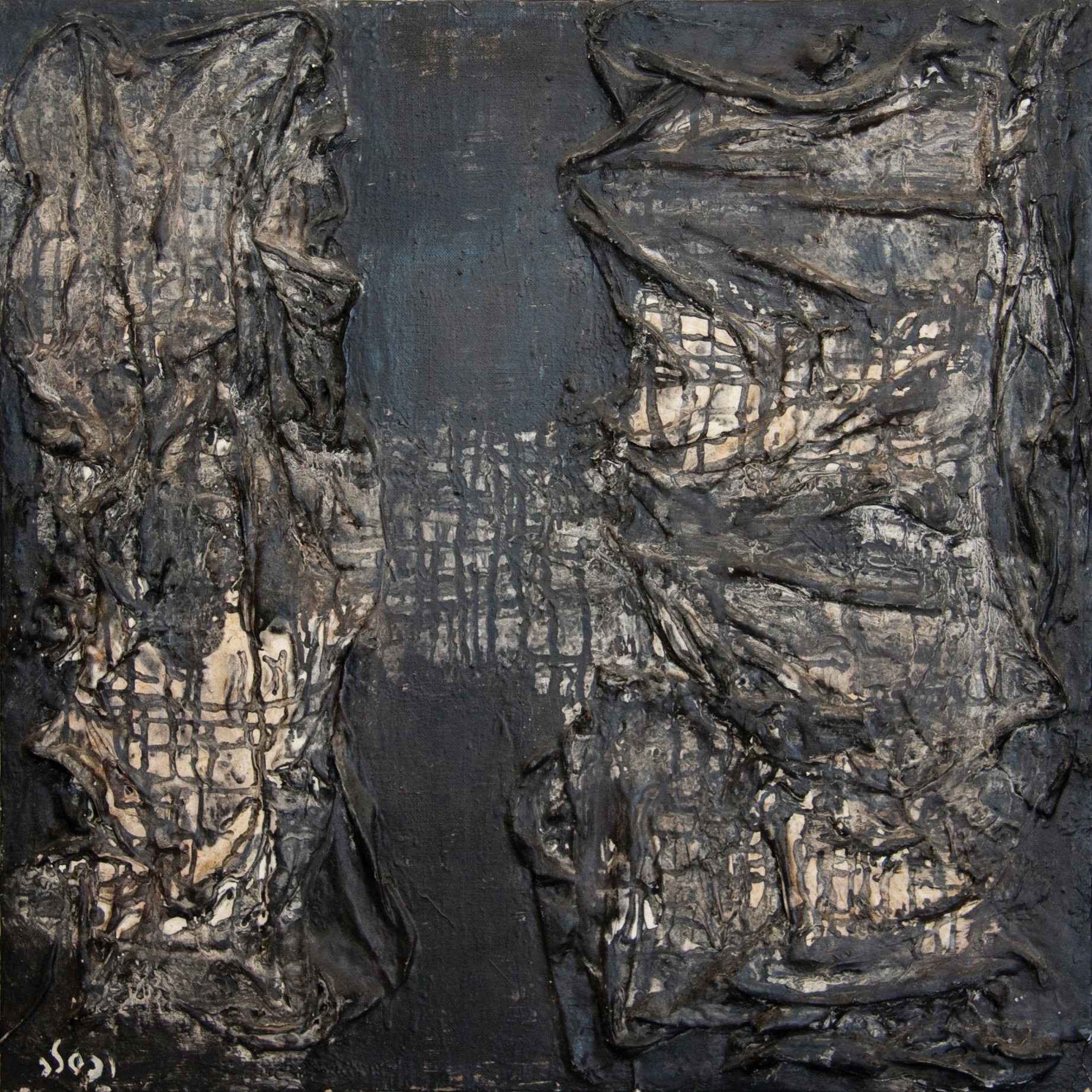
1961, Painting. Acrylic and mixed media on canvas, 65x65 cm

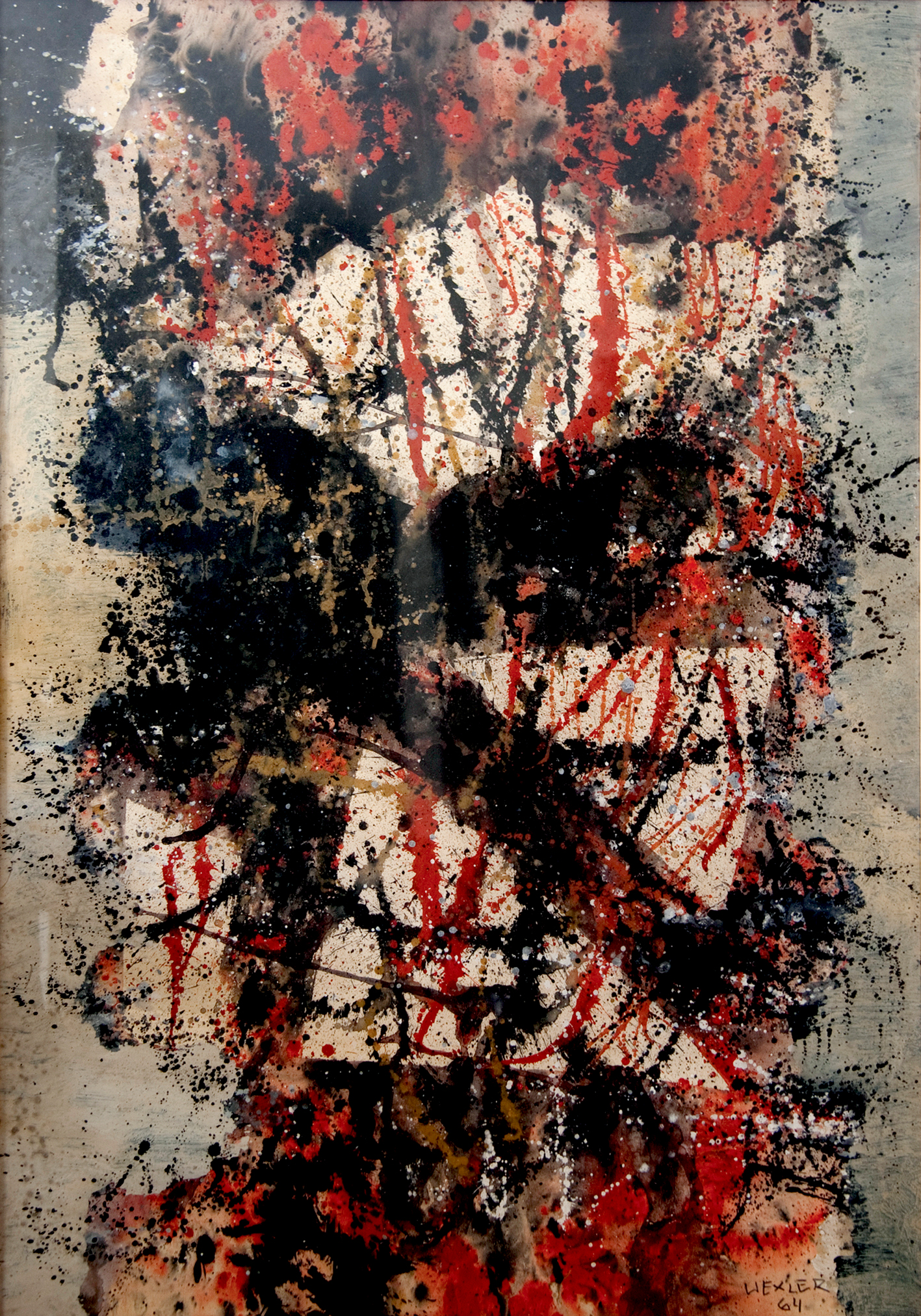
1964, Forms in Space. Acrylic on paper, 70x100 cm

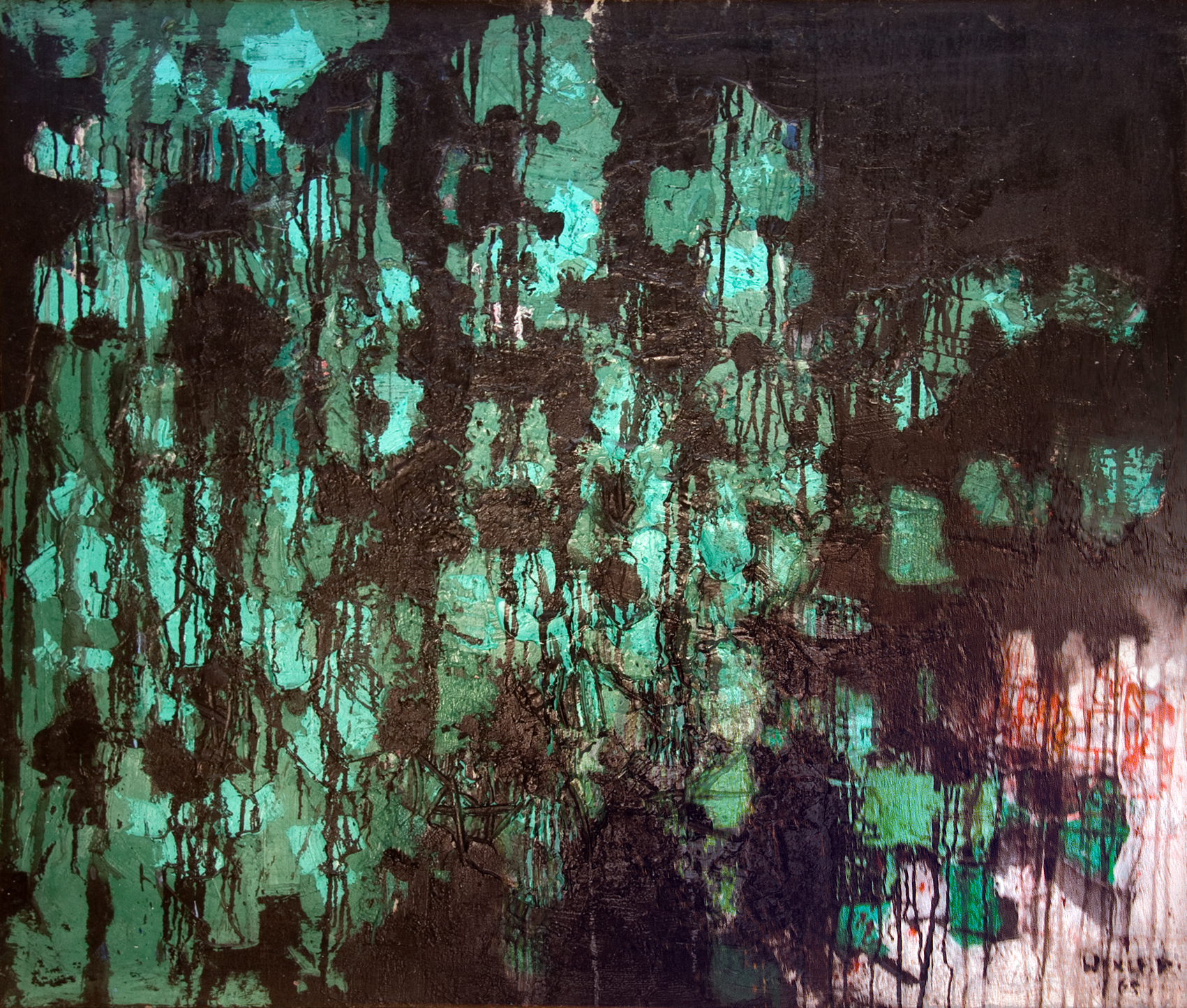
1965, Green Stains. Acrylic on canvas, 115x135 cm

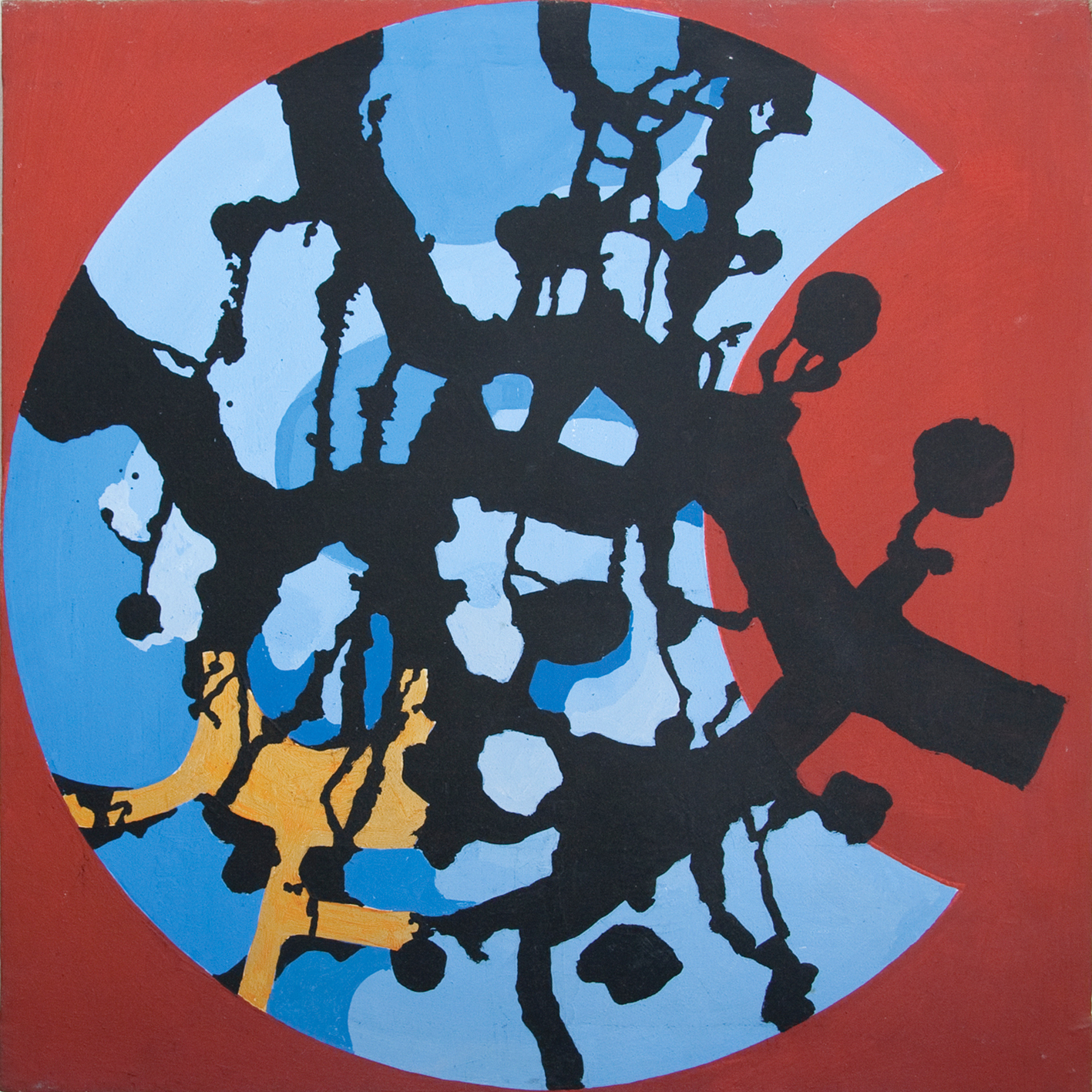
1968, Light and Shadow. Acrylic on canvas, 60x60 cm

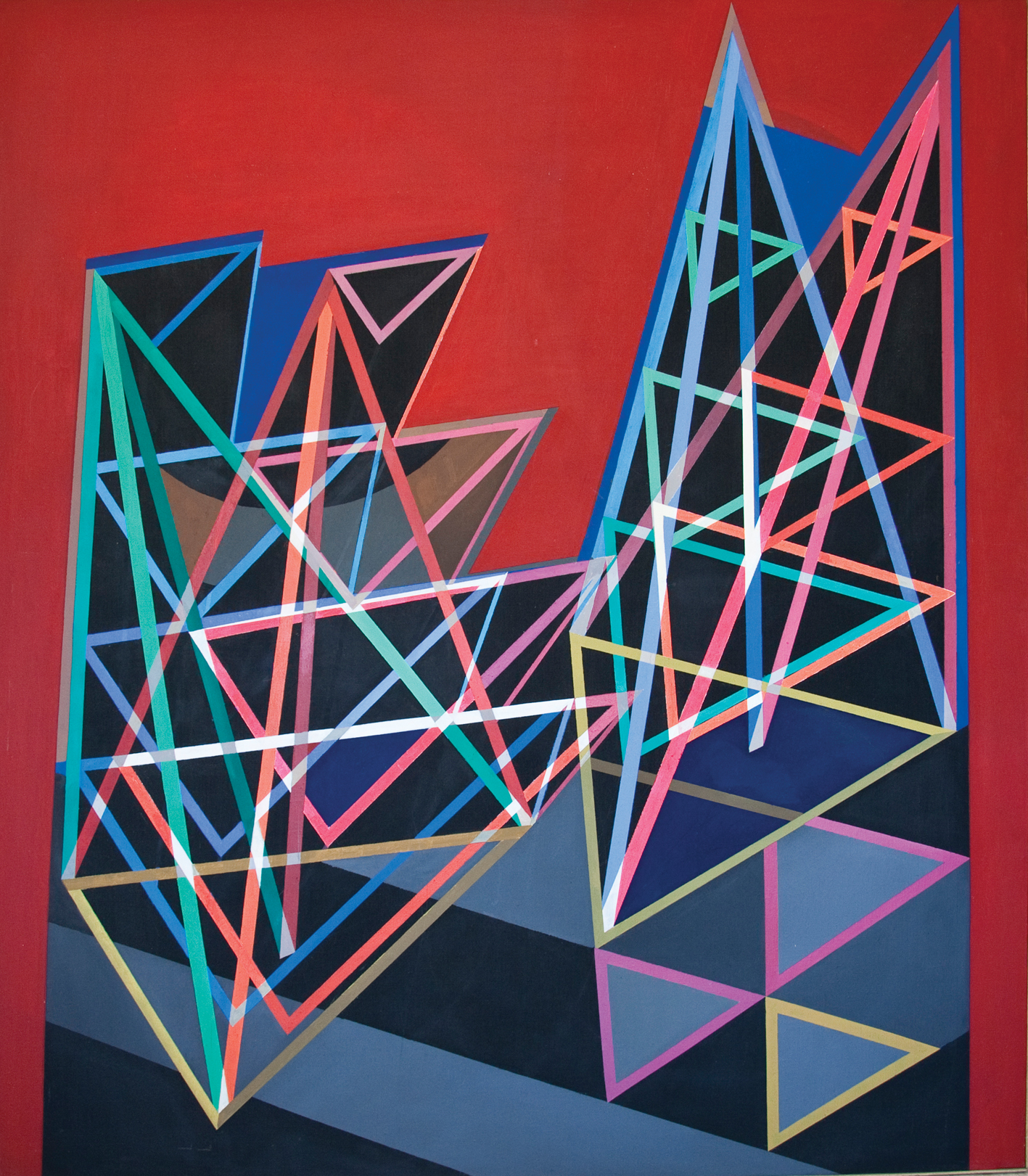
1968, Construction on Red Background. Acrylic on canvas, 183x160 cm

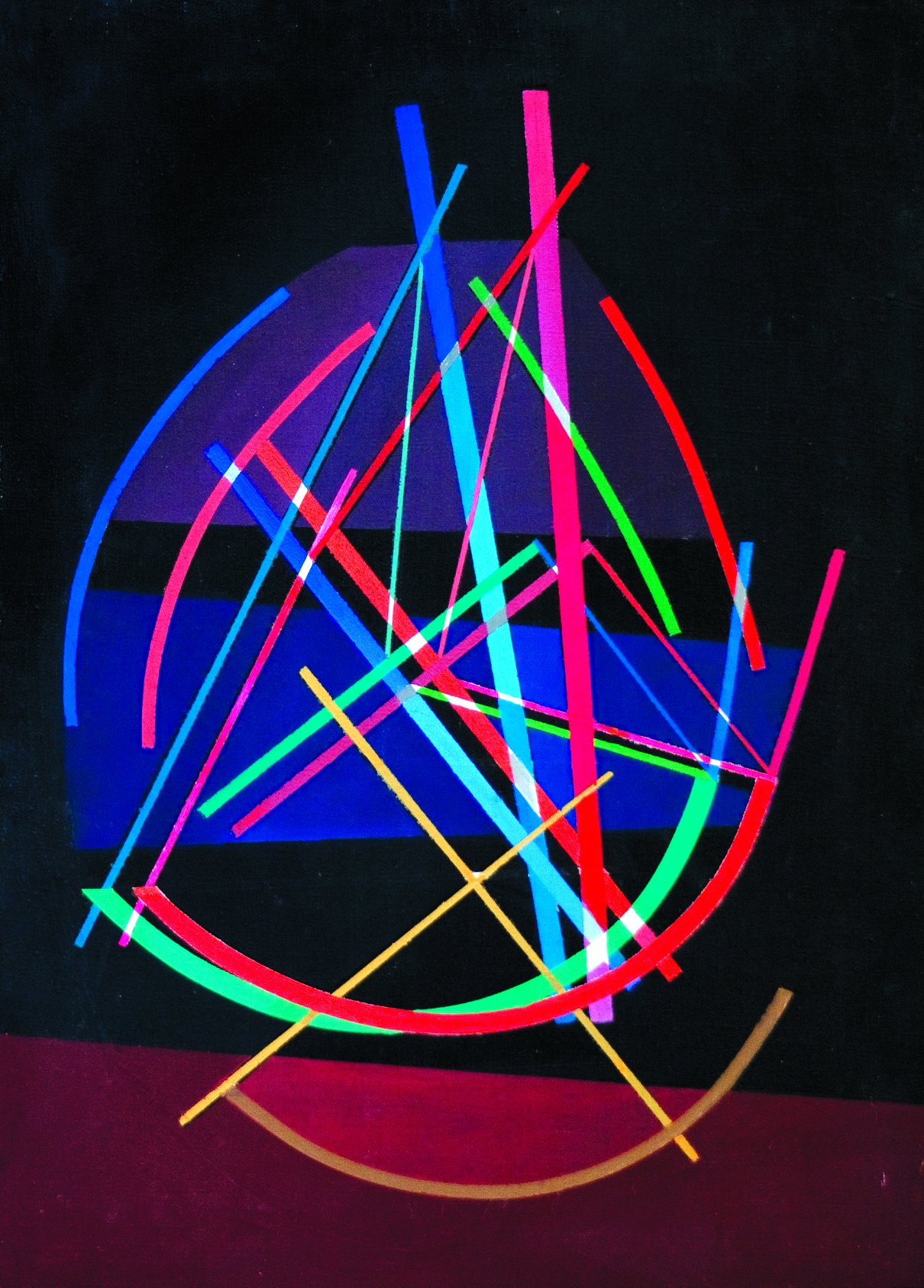
1969, Rocking Chair. Acrylic on canvas, 60x43 cm

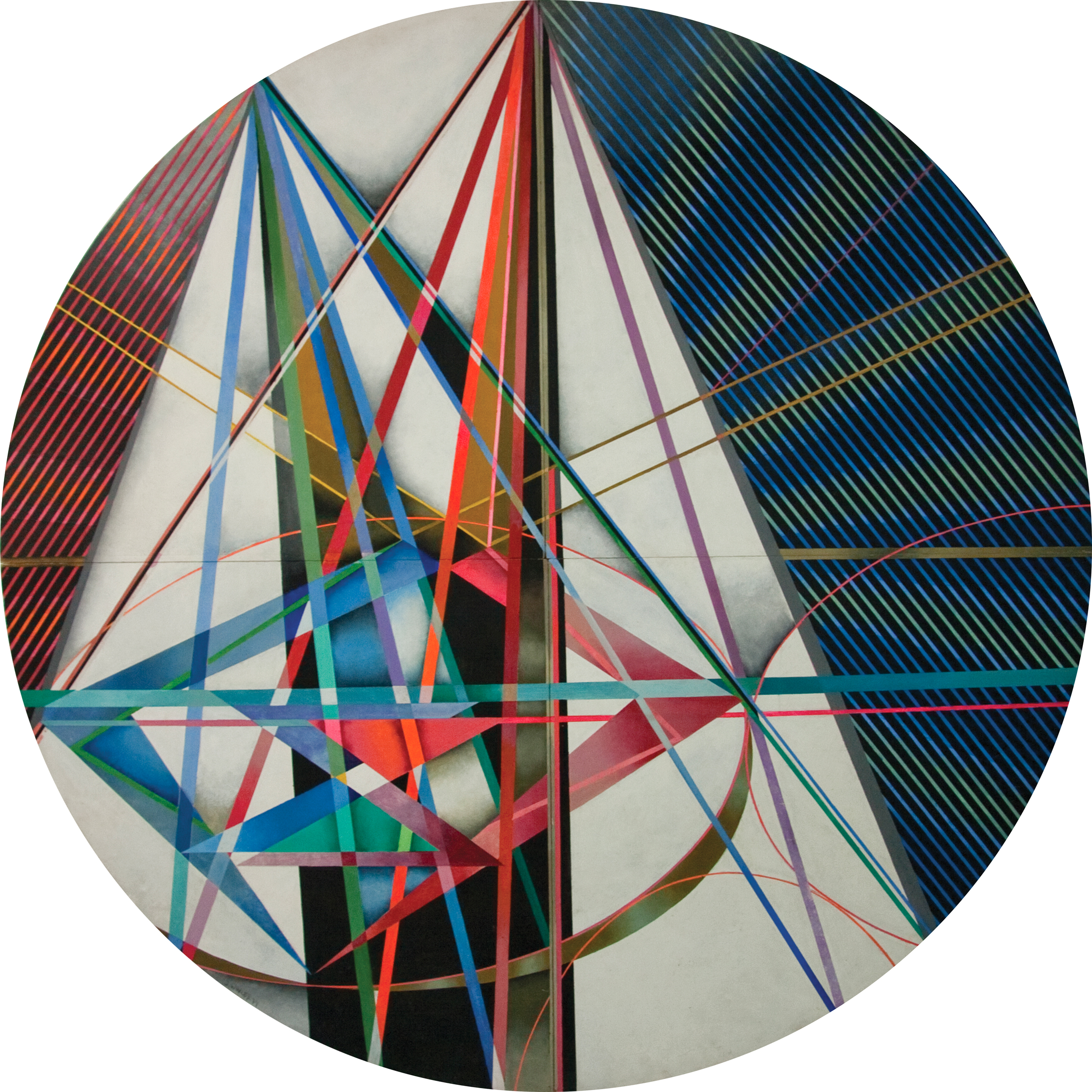
1974, The Second Day. Acrylic on panel, diameter 200 cm

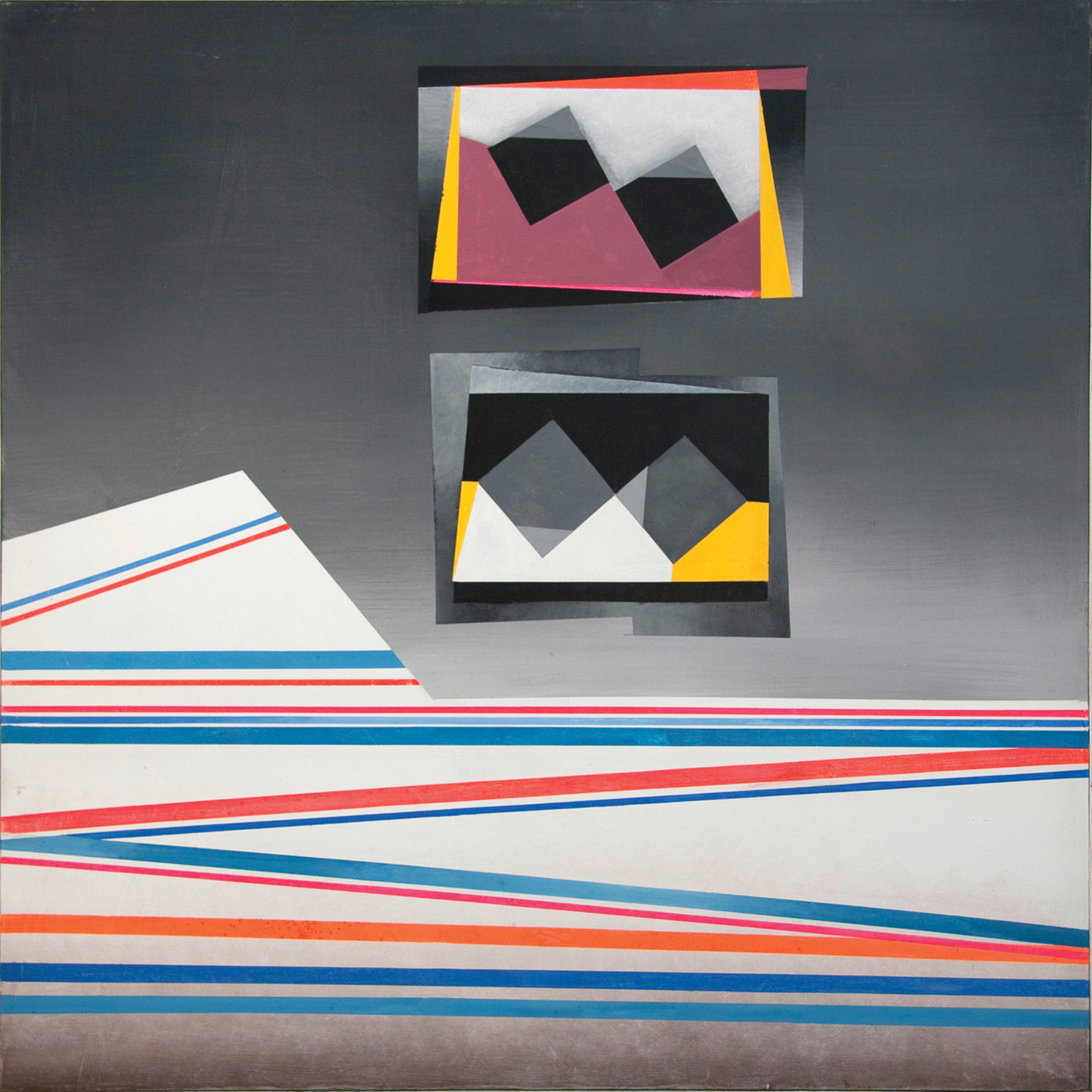
1977, Landscape. Acrylic on panel, 97x97 cm

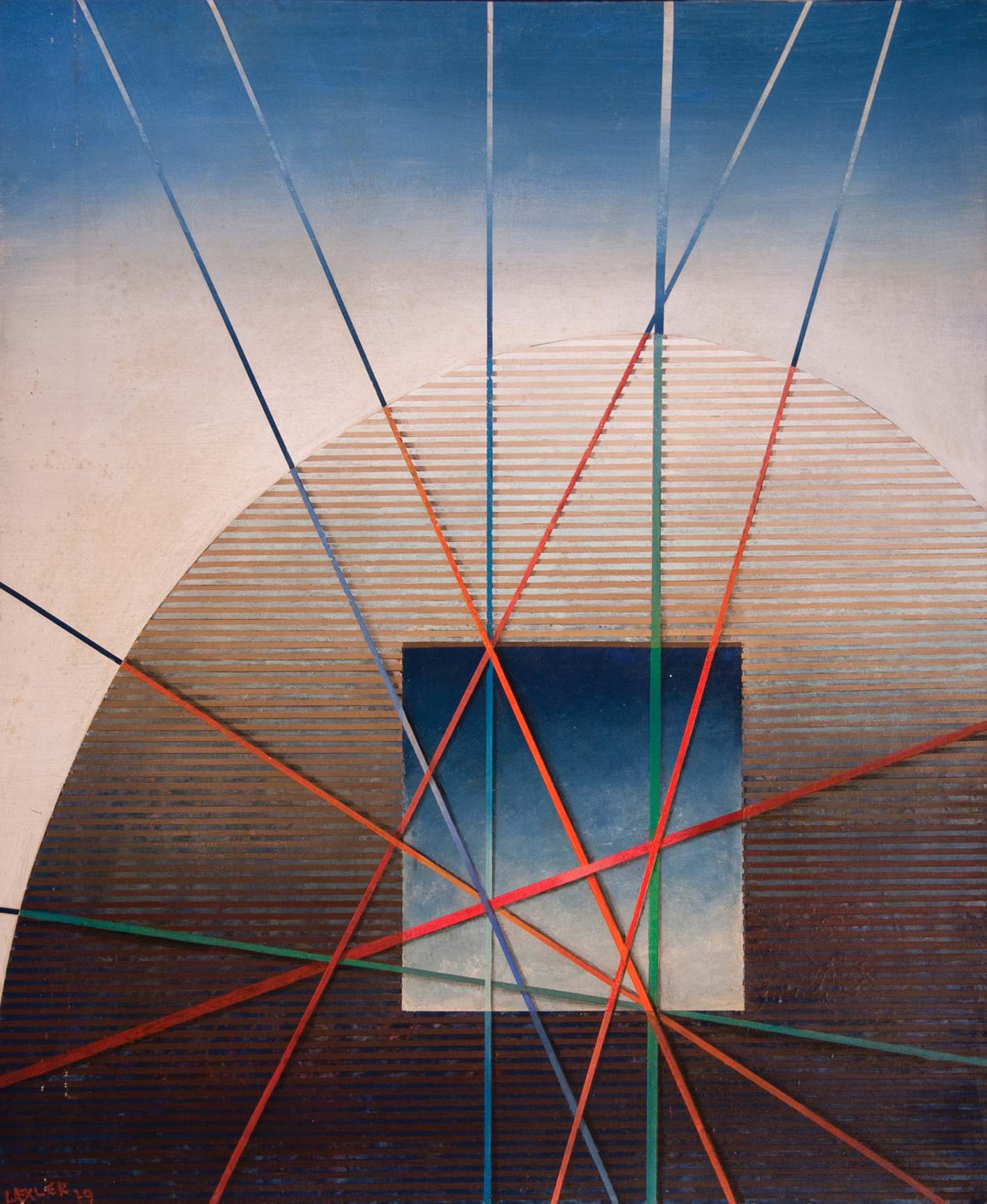
1979, Genesis. Acrylic on panel, 122x100 cm

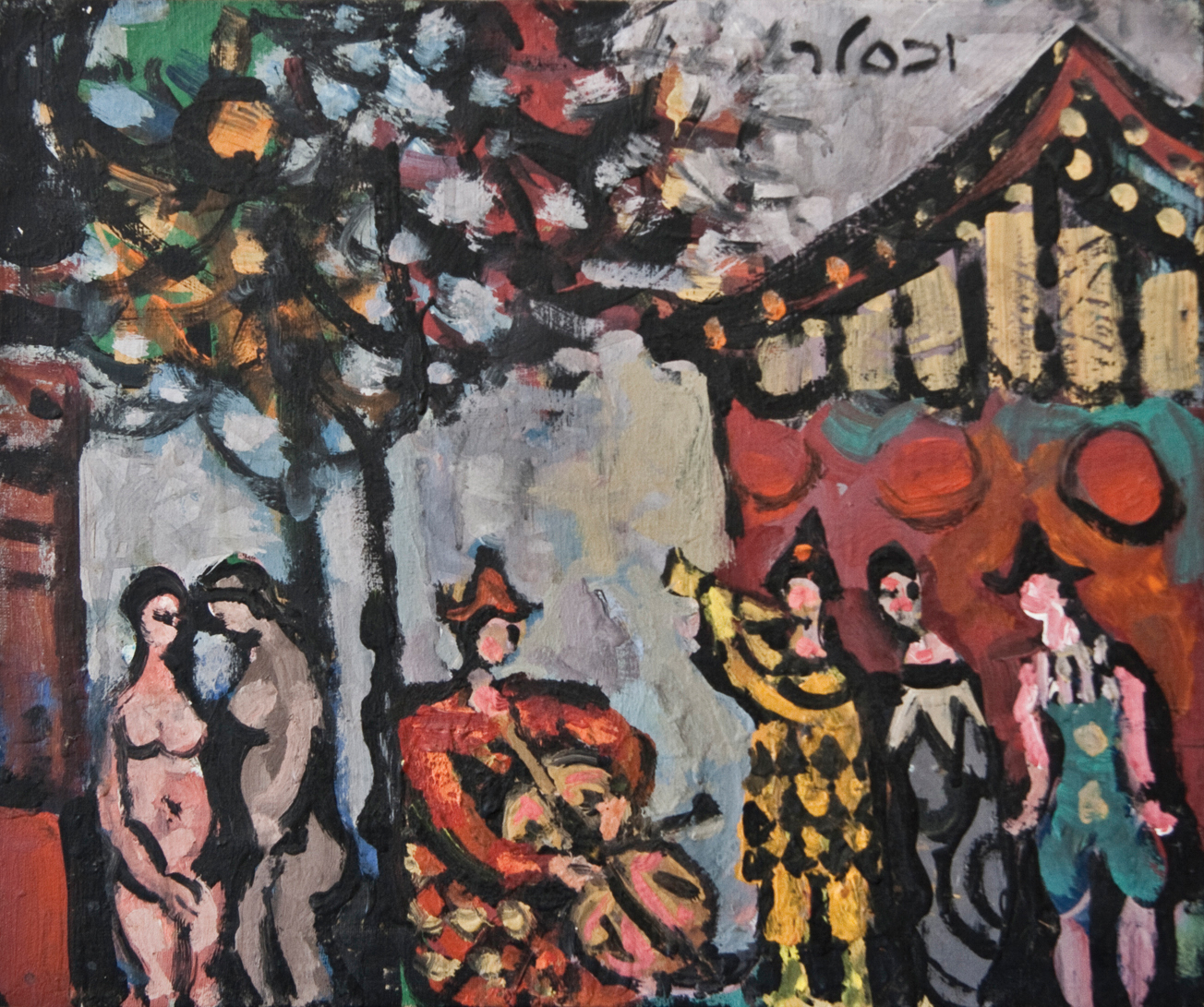
1982, Musicians. Acrylic on canvas, 38x46 cm

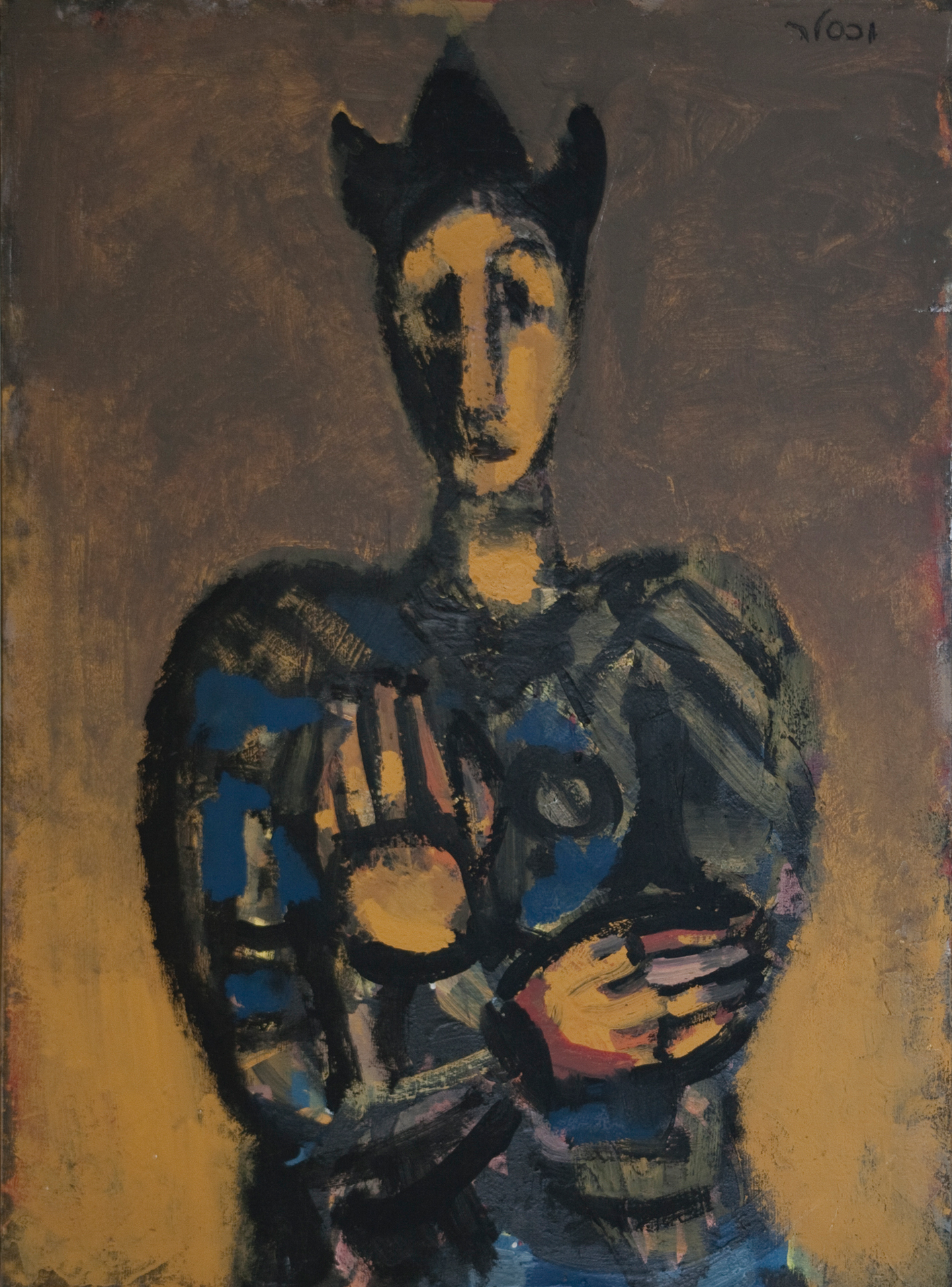
1985, Clown. Acrylic on canvas, 73x54 cm

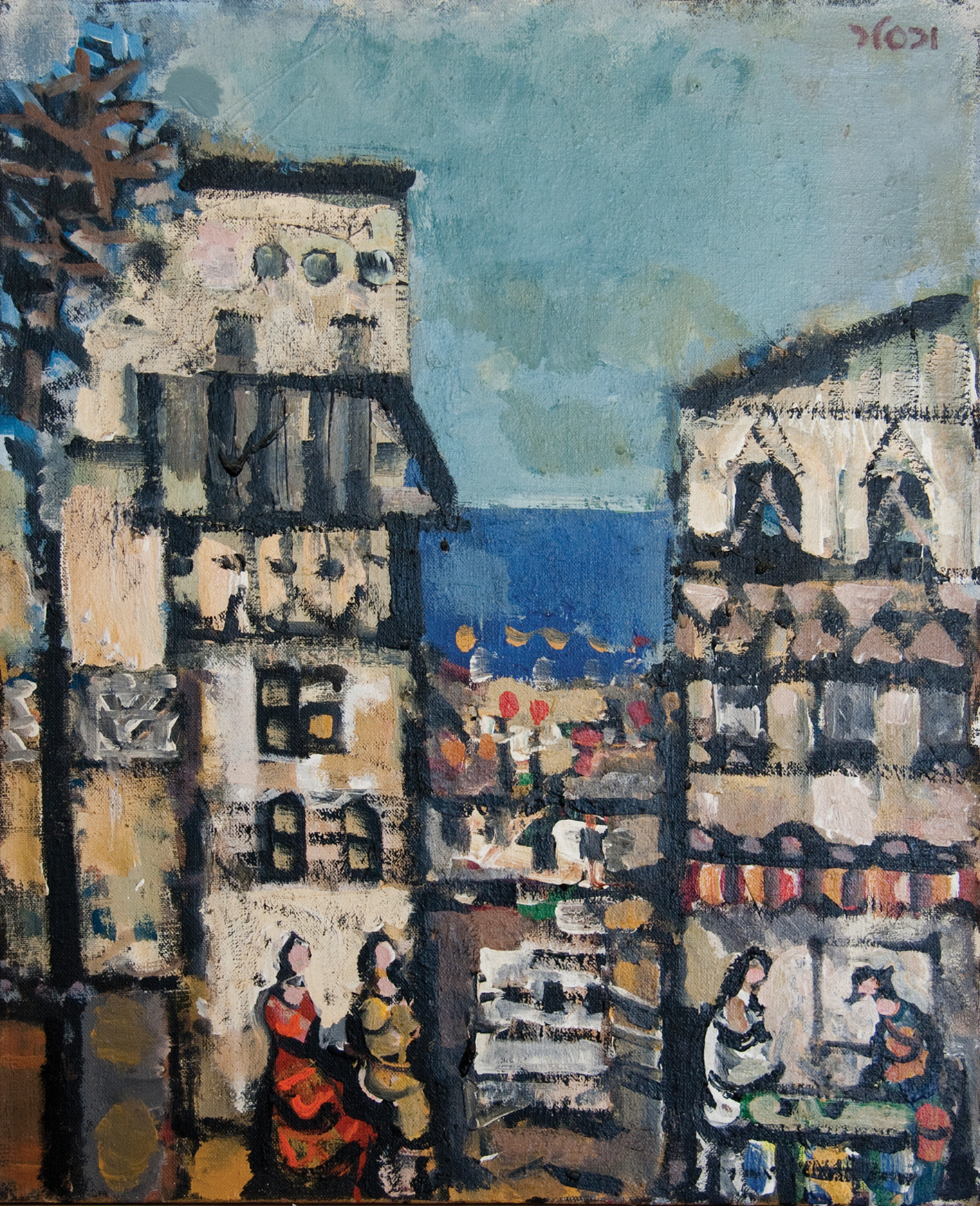
1986, A street in Haifa. Acrylic on canvas, 75x61 cm

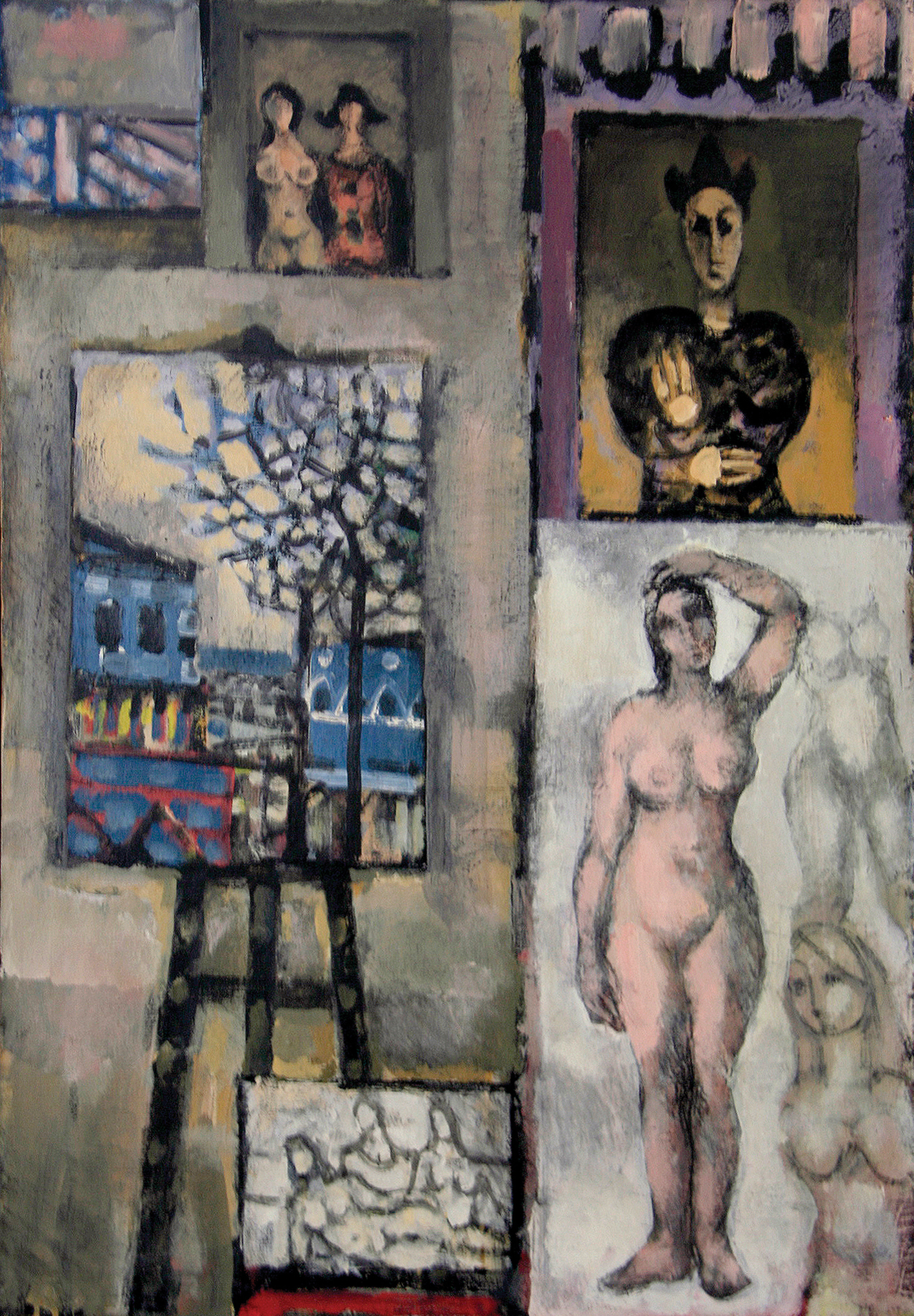
1986, The Studio. Acrylic on canvas, 100x70 cm

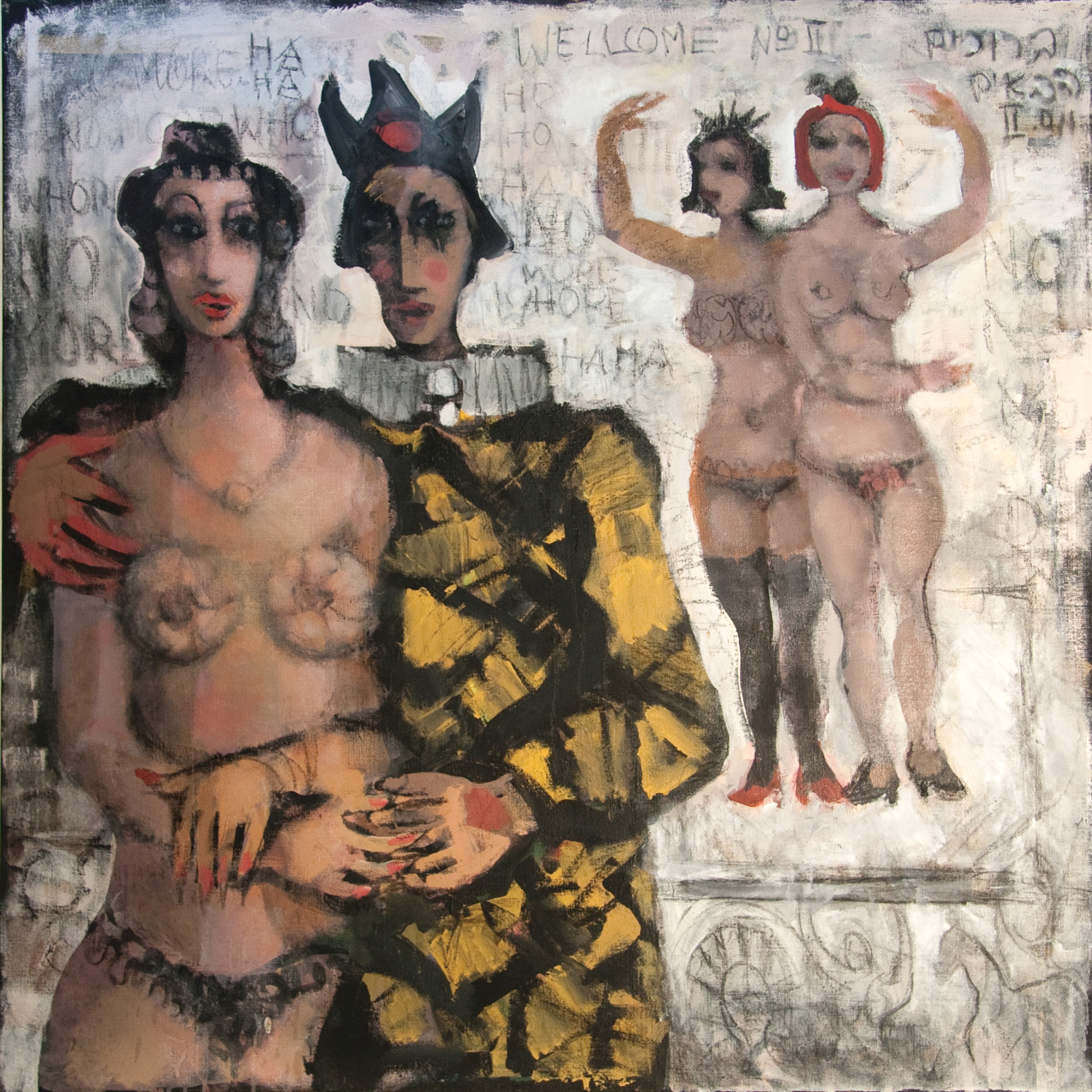
1987, Welcome (No. ll). Acrylic and chalk on canvas, 114x114 cm

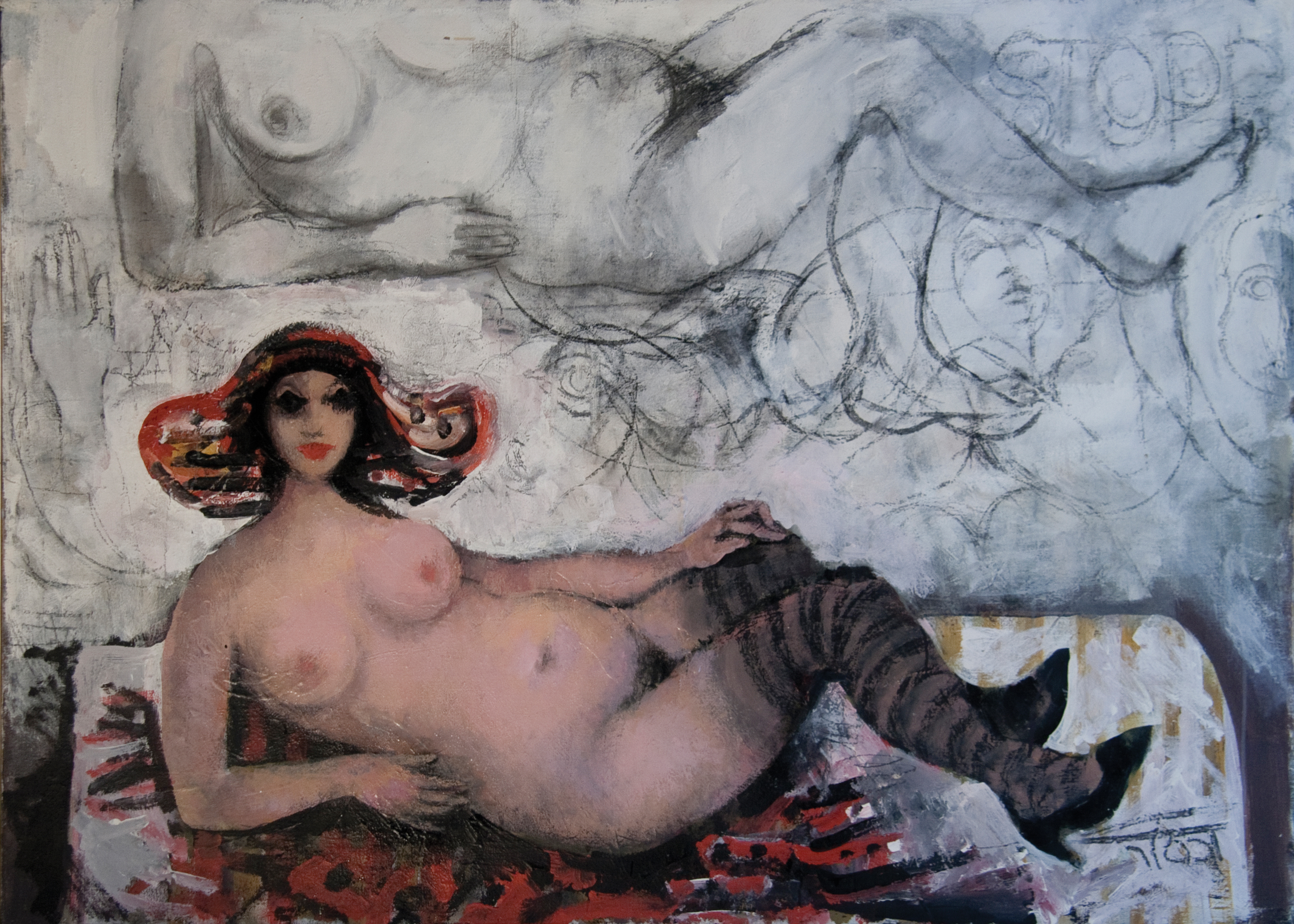
1988, Nude. Acrylic and chalk on canvas, 100x140 cm

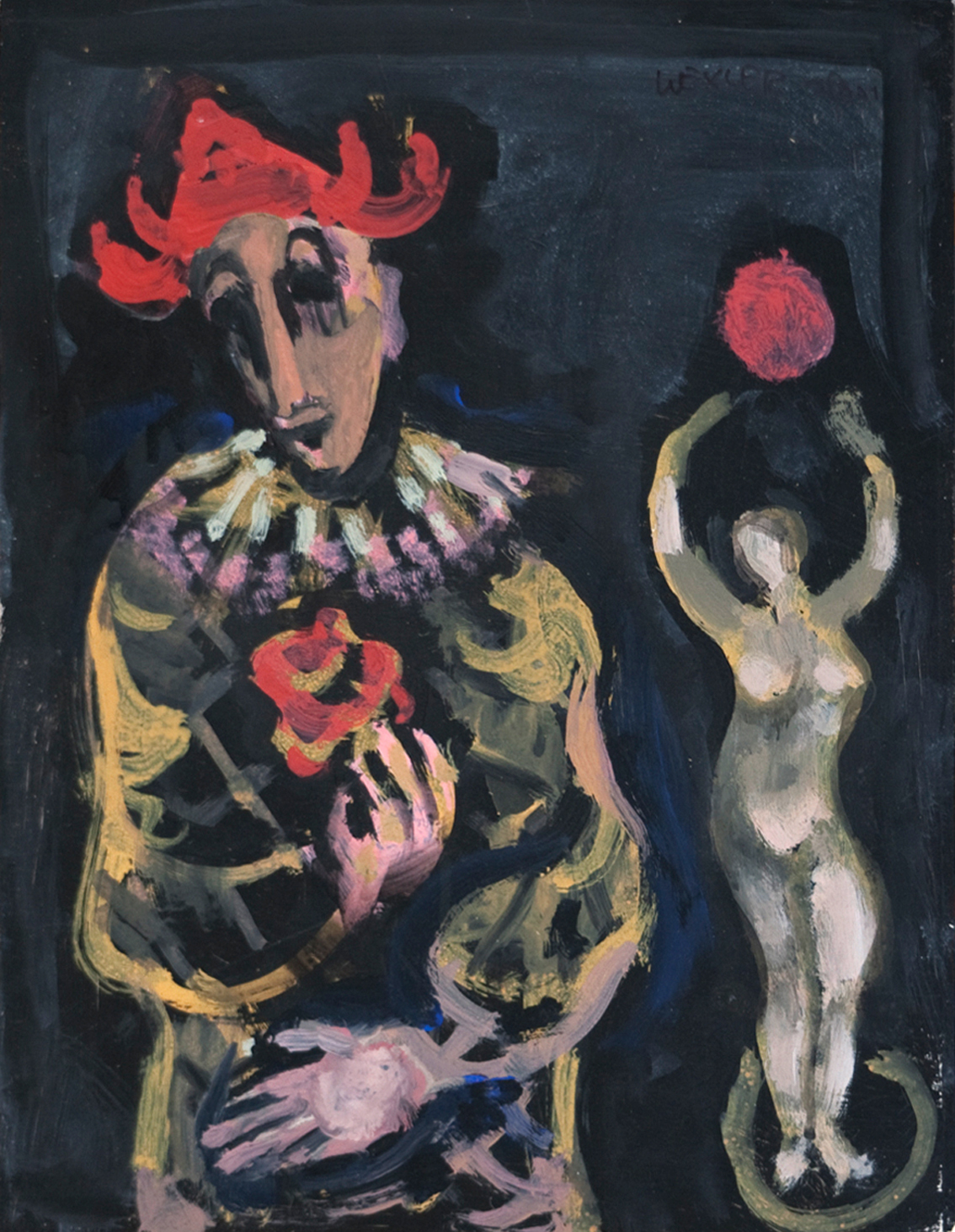
1990, Clown with Flower (Pierrot and Columbine). Acrylic on canvas, 40x31 cm

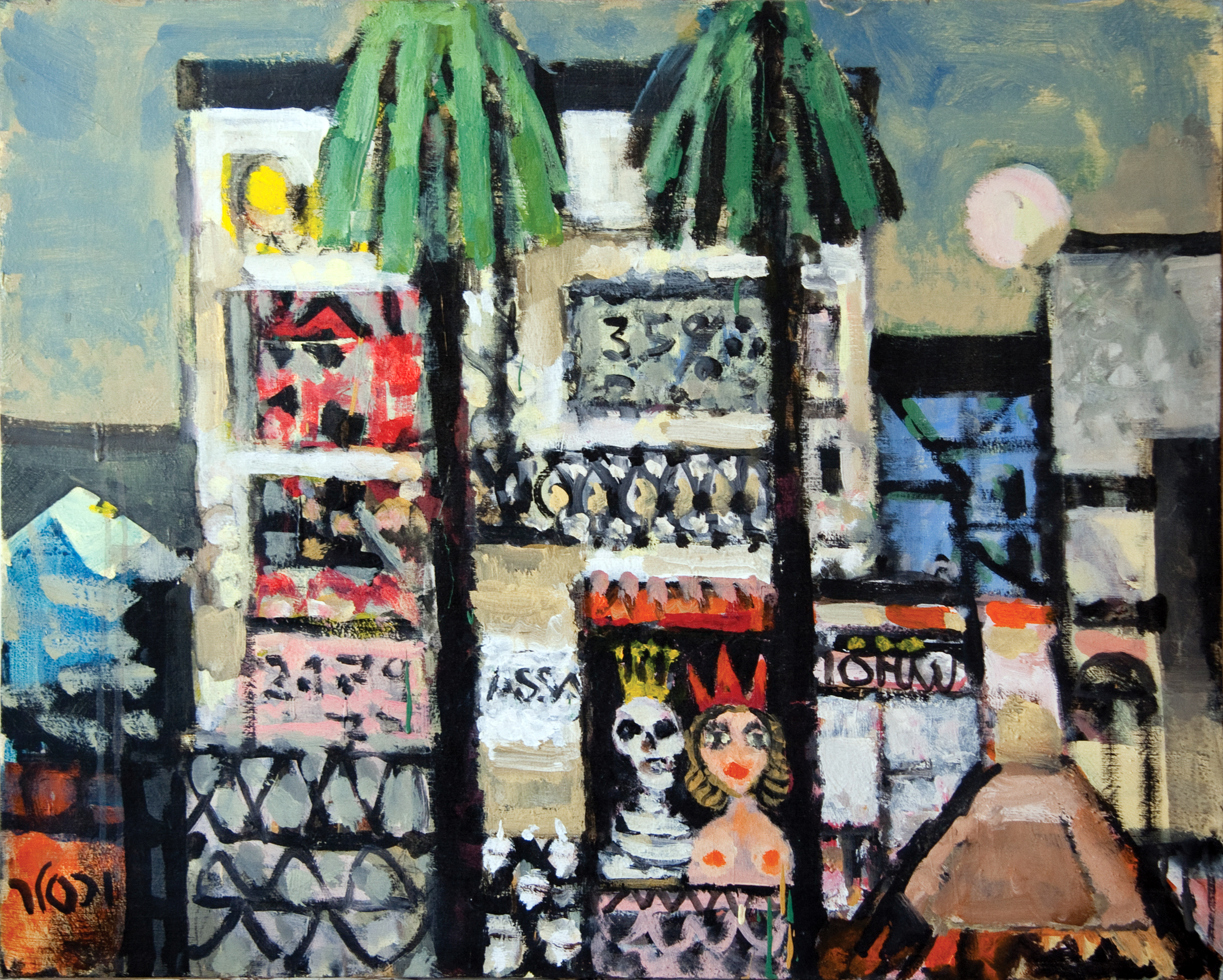
1993, Royal Couple. Acrylic on canvas, 73x91 cm

== See also ==
- Visual arts in Israel
