= The Old King =

Painting by Georges Rouault

- Le Vieux Roi (French)
- Artist: Georges Rouault
- Year: 1936
- Medium: Oil on canvas
- Dimensions: 76.83 cm × 53.98 cm (30.25 in × 21.25 in)
- Location: Carnegie Museum of Art, Pittsburgh

The Old King is a half-length portrait painting of a ruler in profile by the French artist Georges Rouault. It was painted over the course of twenty years, from 1916 to 1936, before an art dealer convinced him to release it.
