= Georges Rouault =

French painter (1871–1958)

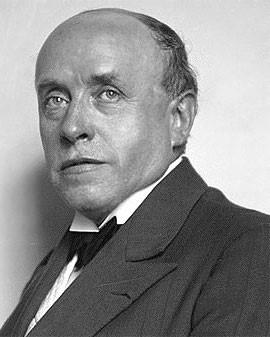
- Georges Rouault (c. 1920)
- Born: Georges-Henri Rouault; 27 May 1871; Paris, France
- Died: 13 February 1958 (aged 86); Paris, France
- Known for: Painting, printmaking
- Movement: Fauvism, Expressionism

Georges Rouault, 1905, Jeu de massacre (Slaughter), (Forains, Cabotins, Pitres), (La noce à Nini patte en l'air), watercolor, gouache, India ink and pastel on paper, 53 x 67 cm, Centre Georges Pompidou, Paris

Georges-Henri Rouault (French: [ʒɔʁʒ(ə) ɑ̃ʁi ʁwo]; 27 May 1871, Paris - 13 February 1958, Paris) was a French painter, draughtsman, and printmaker, whose work is often associated with Fauvism and Expressionism.

== Childhood and education ==
Rouault was born into a poor family in Paris. He was born in a Parisian cellar after his family's home was destroyed in the Paris insurrection of 1871. His mother encouraged his love for the arts, and, in 1885, the fourteen-year-old Rouault embarked on an apprenticeship as a glass painter and restorer, which lasted until 1890. This early experience as a glass painter has been suggested as a likely source of the heavy black contouring and glowing colors, likened to leaded glass, which characterize Rouault's mature painting style. During his apprenticeship, he also attended evening classes at the School of Fine Arts, and in 1890, he entered the École des Beaux-Arts, the official art school of France. There he studied under Gustave Moreau and became his favorite student. Rouault's earliest works show a symbolism in the use of color that probably reflects Moreau's influence, which he would later move away from. When Moreau died in 1898, Rouault was nominated as the curator of the Moreau Museum in Paris.

== Personal life ==
Roualt became a devout Roman Catholic following an emotional breakdown in 1895 or after.

== Early works ==
In 1891 Rouault painted The Way to Calvary. In 1894, Rouault won the Prix Chenavard. From 1895 on, he took part in major public exhibitions, notably the Salon d'Automne (which he helped to found), where paintings with religious subjects, landscapes, and still lifes were shown. Rouault met Henri Matisse, Albert Marquet, Henri Manguin, and Charles Camoin. These friendships brought him to the movement of Fauvism, the leader of which was considered to be Matisse. In 1905, he exhibited his paintings at the Salon d'Automne with the other Fauvists. While Matisse represented the reflective and rationalized aspects of the group, Rouault embodied a more spontaneous and instinctive style.

His use of stark contrasts and emotionality is credited to the influence of Vincent van Gogh. His characterizations of overemphasized grotesque personalities inspired the expressionist painters.

== Expressionist works ==
In 1907, Rouault commenced a series of paintings dedicated to courts, clowns, and prostitutes. These paintings are interpreted as moral and social criticism. He became attracted to Spiritualism and the dramatic existentialism of the philosopher Jacques Maritain, who remained a close friend for the rest of his life. After that, he dedicated himself to religious subjects. Human nature was always the focus of his interest. Rouault said: "A tree against the sky possesses the same interest, the same character, the same expression as the figure of a human."

In 1910, Rouault had his first works exhibited in the Druet Gallery. His works were studied by German artists from Dresden, who later formed the nucleus of expressionism.

From 1917, Rouault dedicated himself to painting. The Christian faith informed his work in his search for inspiration and marks him out as perhaps the most passionate Christian artist of the 20th century: first of all, in the theme of the passion of Christ. The face of Jesus and the cries of the women at the feet of the cross are symbols of the pain of the world, which for Rouault was relieved by belief in resurrection.

In 1929, Rouault created the designs for Sergei Diaghilev's ballet The Prodigal Son, with music by Sergei Prokofiev and choreography by George Balanchine.

In 1930, he also began to exhibit in foreign countries, mainly in London, New York, and Chicago.

In 1937. Rouault painted The Old King, which is arguably his finest expressionist work.

In 1939. Rouault advised French art dealer Paul Rosenberg on several purchases. One of them is a Christ flagellé shown at the Van Leer Family's house.

He exhibited his cycle Miserere in 1948.

== Ambroise Vollard ==
In the 1910s, the Paris art dealer Ambroise Vollard—who had earlier promoted Cézanne, Van Gogh and Gauguin, struck a sponsorship deal with Rouault: “Rouault was to receive a permanent studio in Vollard’s palatial mansion and an initial cash advance of $10,000. In return Vollard was to have the [dealer’s] right to Rouault’s entire output as a painter. To a man of Rouault’s temperament, impoverished and with a family to support, the offer seemed a good solution to all his problems. All he had to do was paint.” But, as LIFE magazine reported in 1953, “in the process Rouault practically became a prisoner of Vollard….Rouault would lock himself in his studio at Vollard’s place and work by the hour, forbidding Vollard to even look at his paintings….’I spent hours in the summer,’ Rouault remembers, ‘working with my torso naked in 102-degree heat….Vollard was always on my back. I worked like a couple of Negro slaves, not one. I dined sometimes at 10 in the evening. Vollard would come and say, ‘Hurry up, the museums are asking for more.’ Sometimes he would give me 300 paintings to retouch at a time. Everyone was afraid of Vollard.’ Occasionally Vollard would take Rouault out to dinner and they would shout and belabor each other all evening. ‘He just cooked you in all sorts of sauces,’ complains Rouault.”

Vollard died in 1939. After WWII, in May 1946, Rouault sued Vollard’s heirs to recover the “unfinished and unsigned paintings which he feared might come upon the market,” and the French courts found for Rouault.

== 1948 Burning of His Artwork ==
On 5 November 1948 Rouault took 315 of his sketches and oil paintings—later confirmed by LIFE magazine to have been from the Vollard cache—to a factory on Paris’s outskirts, where they were incinerated. A Parisian art dealer reported that he had been meaning for some time to destroy them “because he didn’t want them hanging around….They were all unfinished works…and he did not consider them worthy of his standards.” In 1953, LIFE magazine commented on the burning: “Half a million dollars of art went up in smoke. But shrewd observers noted that there was a suspicion of method in this apparent madness. The sudden unloading of 315 Rouaults might have depressed the art market, which is as sensitive to supply and demand as a stock exchange….Whatever the anguish that his dramatic bonfire might have caused the artist, it undoubtedly raised the value of the world’s remaining Rouaults.”

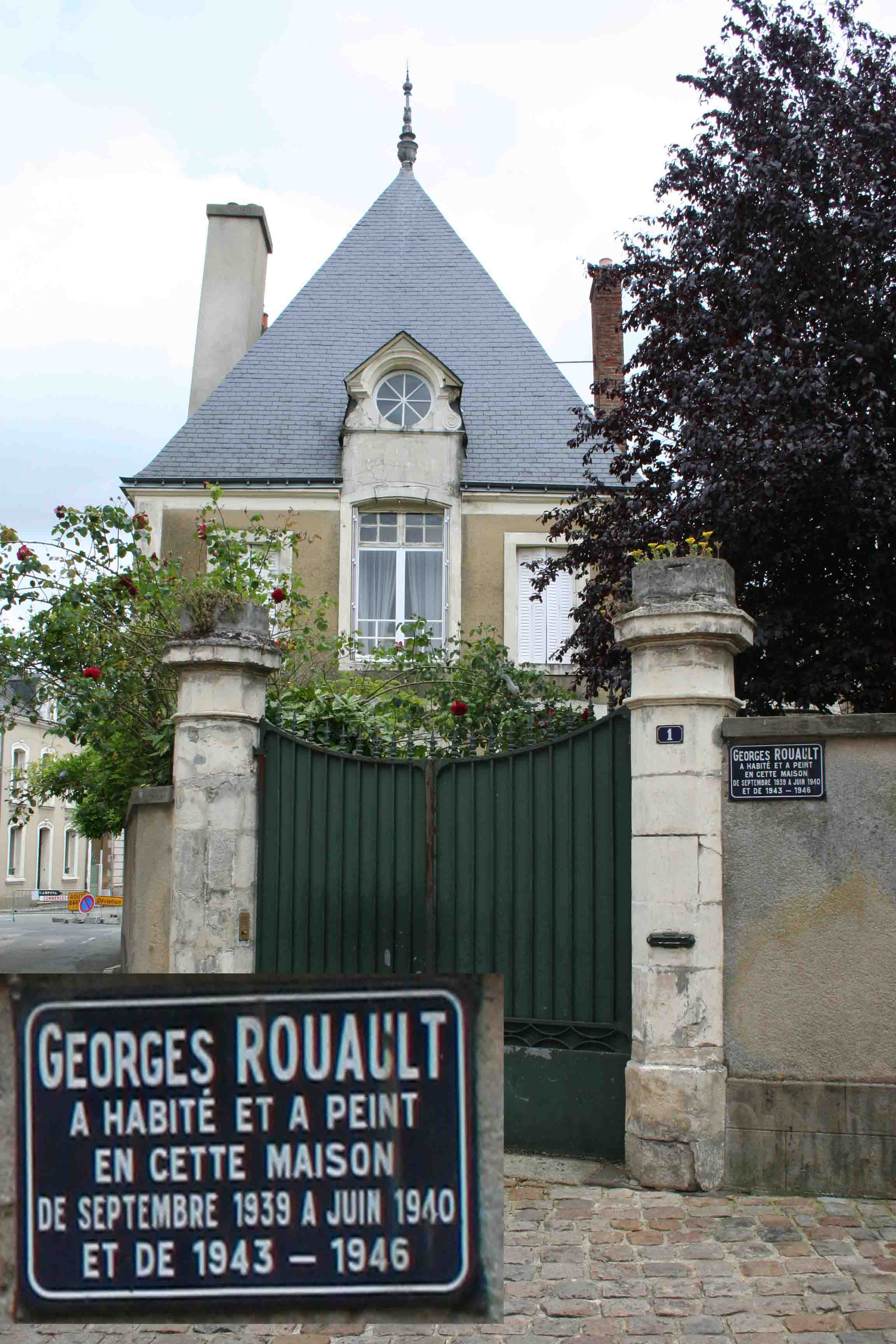
Photograph of house in Beaumont sur Sarthe, Pays De La Loire, France, claiming Georges Rouault to have lived there

== Honors and awards ==
- Knight of the Order of Legion of Honour
- Officer of the Order of Legion of Honour
- Commander of the Order of Legion of Honour
