= Orry =

Orry may refer to:

== People ==
- Jean Orry (1652–1719), French economist and financial and governmental reformer
- Philibert Orry (1689–1747), French statesman, count of Vignory and lord of La Chapelle-Godefroy
- Orry-Kelly (1897–1964), the professional name of Orry George Kelly, a prolific Hollywood costume designer
- Peter Orry Larsen (born 1989), Norwegian footballer

== Other uses ==
- Orry, the official mascot of the 2006 Asian Games
- Orry-la-Ville, town in northern France
- SS King Orry (1946), the lead ship of the King Orry class of passenger ferries and packet ships built for the Isle of Man Steam Packet

== See also ==
- King Orry (disambiguation)
- Ori (disambiguation)
- Ory (disambiguation)
