= SS Mona's Isle (1950) =

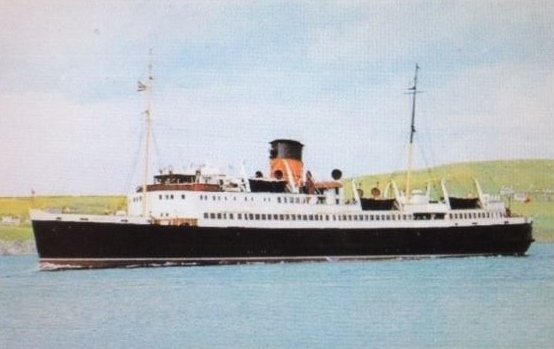
- Mona's Isle approaching Douglas, Isle of Man

History
- Name: TSS Mona’s Isle
- Owner: 1951–1980: IOMSPCo.
- Operator: 1951–1980: IOMSPCo.
- Port of registry: Douglas, Isle of Man
- Builder: Cammell Laird
- Cost: £570,000
- Yard number: 1209
- Launched: 12 October 1950
- Maiden voyage: 22 March 1951
- Out of service: 1980
- Identification: IMO number: 5239266
- Fate: Scrapped 1980

General characteristics
- Tonnage: 2,495 gross register tons (GRT)
- Speed: 21.5 knots
- Capacity: 2268 passengers
- Crew: 67

TSS Mona’s Isle V, the fifth ship in the line's history to bear the name, was a passenger vessel operated by the Isle of Man Steam Packet Company from 1951 to 1980. She was the last of the company's ships to use low pressure turbines.

== History ==
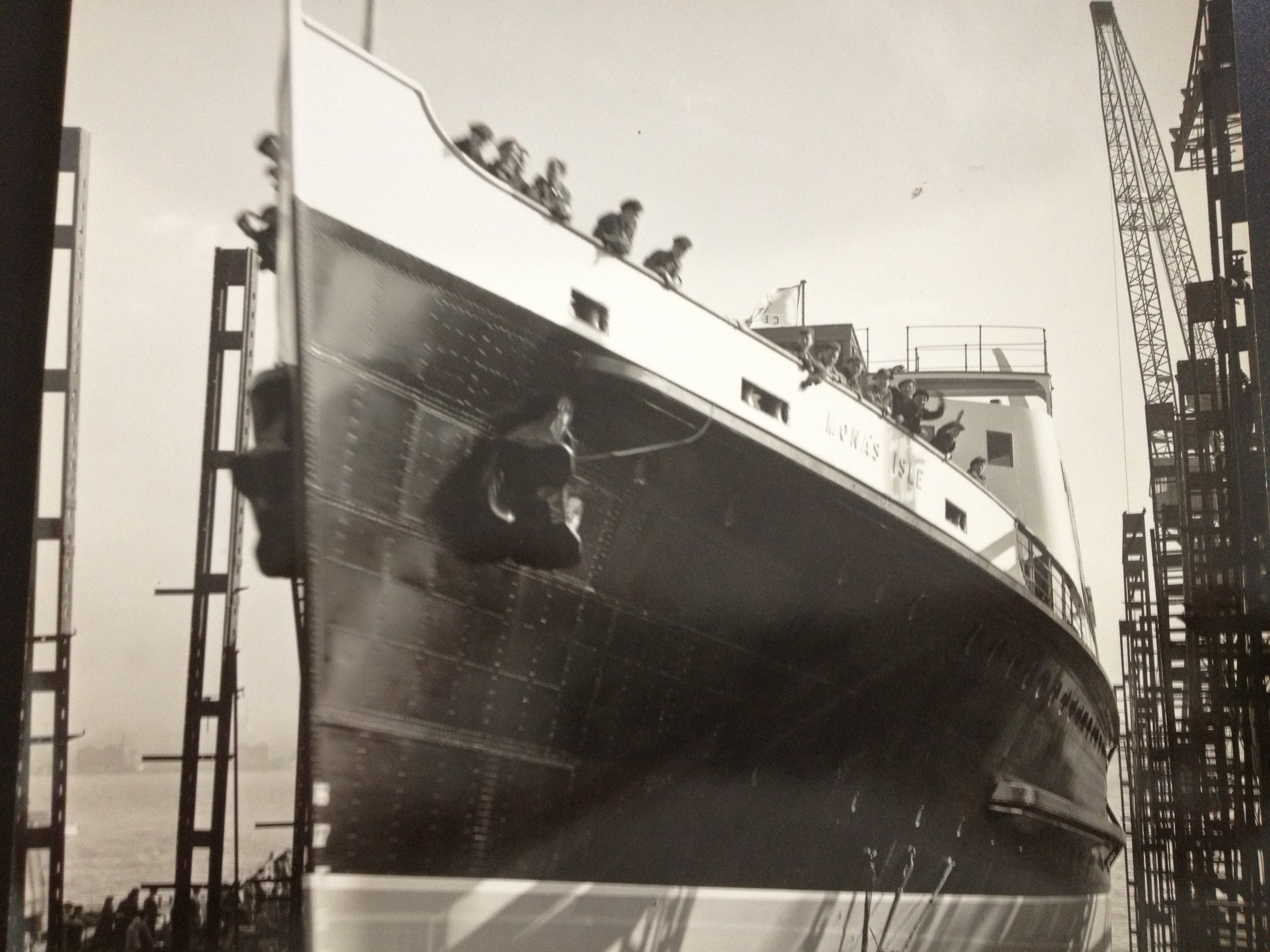
Mona's Isle is launched at Birkenhead, 12 October 1950

=== Design ===
Virtually identical to her four older sisters, King Orry, Mona's Queen, Tynwald and Snaefell, Mona's Isle was built at Cammell Laird, as the fifth of the six sisters delivered by the company between 1946 and 1955 at a cost of £570,000.

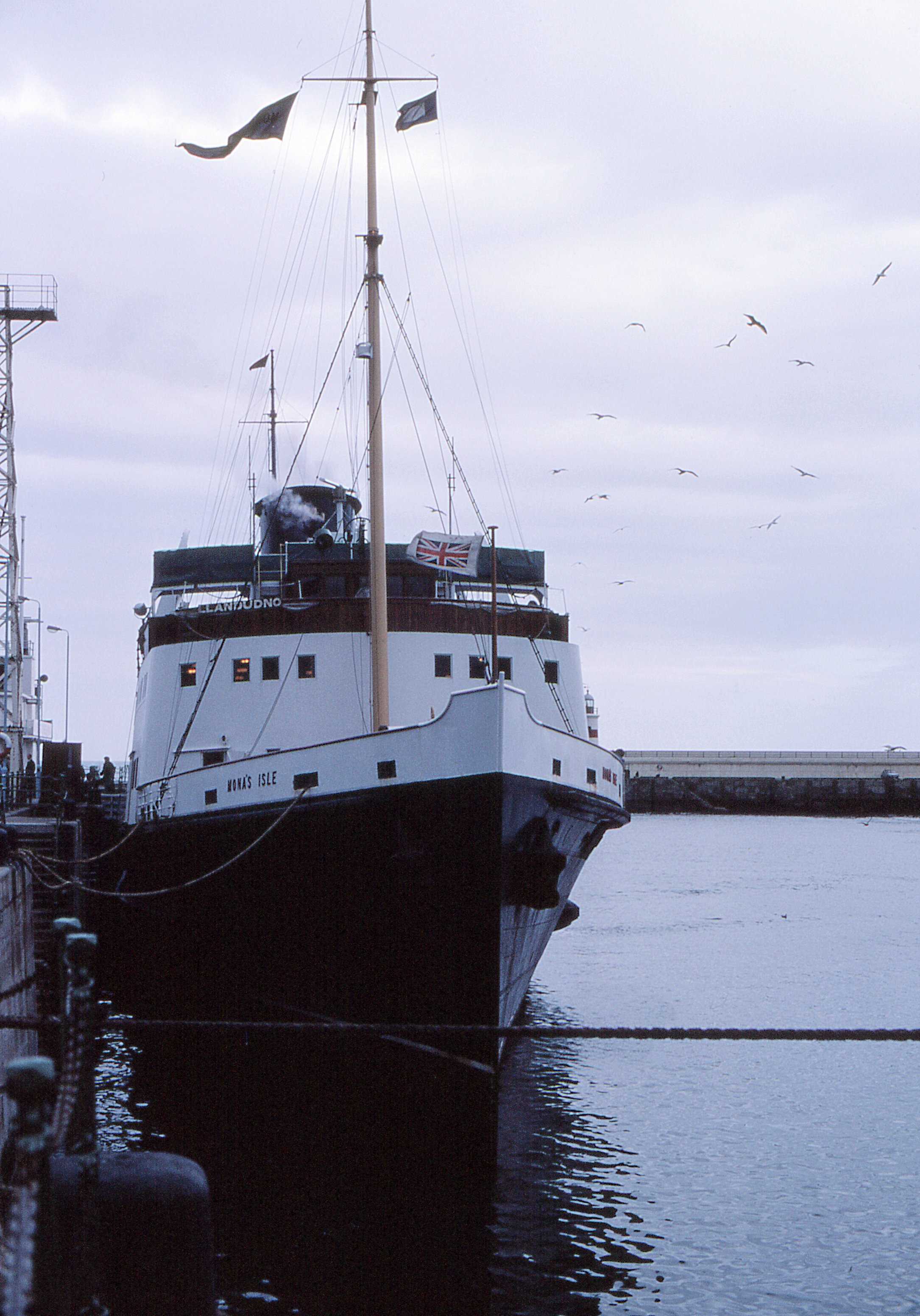
Mona's Isle at Douglas, August 1980

Although she was very like Snaefell, Mona's Isle could be identified from her by not having the Manx crest on her bows. At the stern, whereas the Snaefell had rails and mesh, Mona's Isle had solid bulwarks.

== Service life ==
=== Operational career ===
She started service between Douglas, Isle of Man and the various ports then served by the Steam Packet.

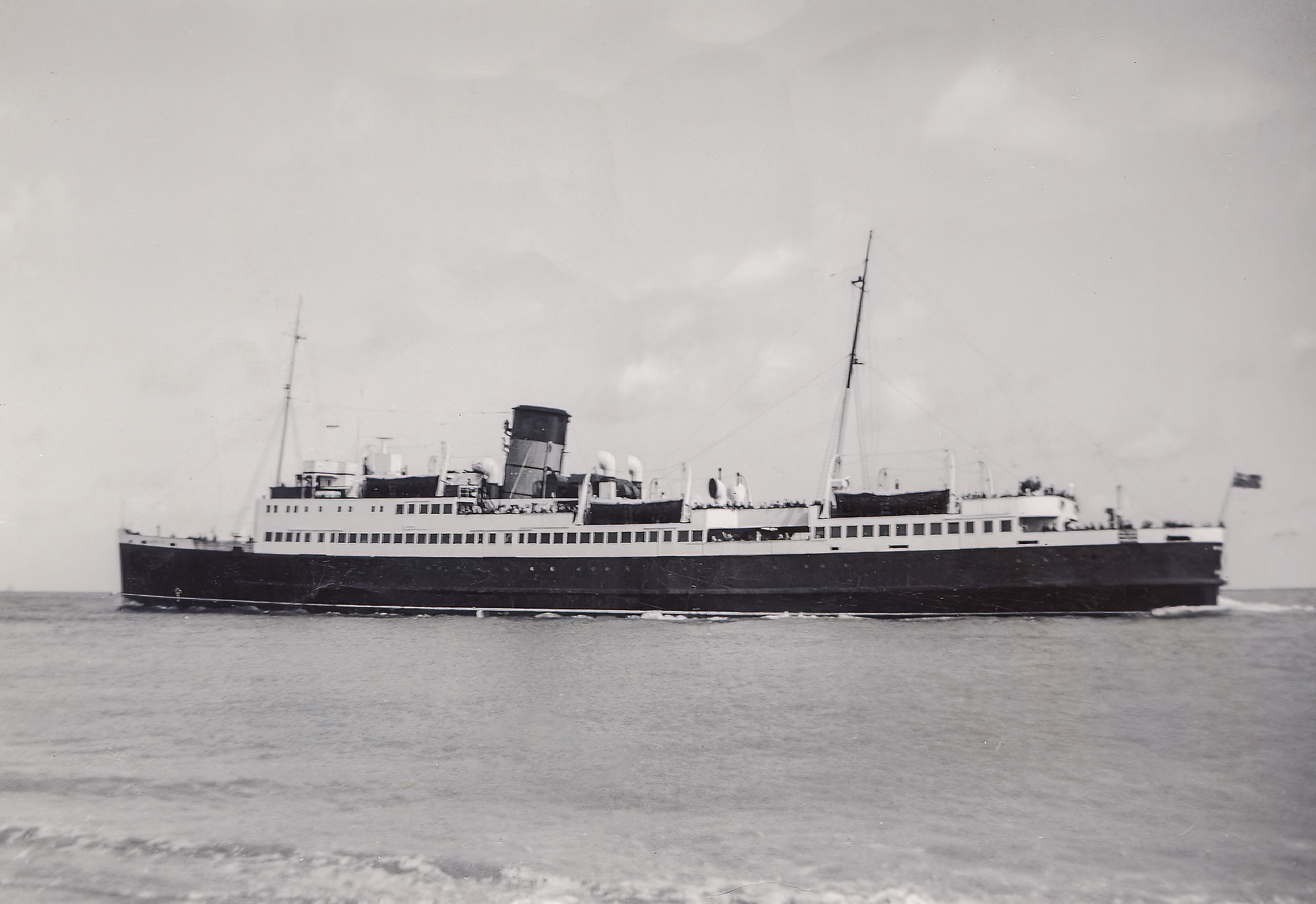
Mona's Isle Fleetwood 1960

On 8 June 1955, she went aground off Fleetwood after a collision with the Ludo, a small fishing vessel. One man, Francis Stewart, was lost from the Ludo which was cut in half and sank almost immediately.

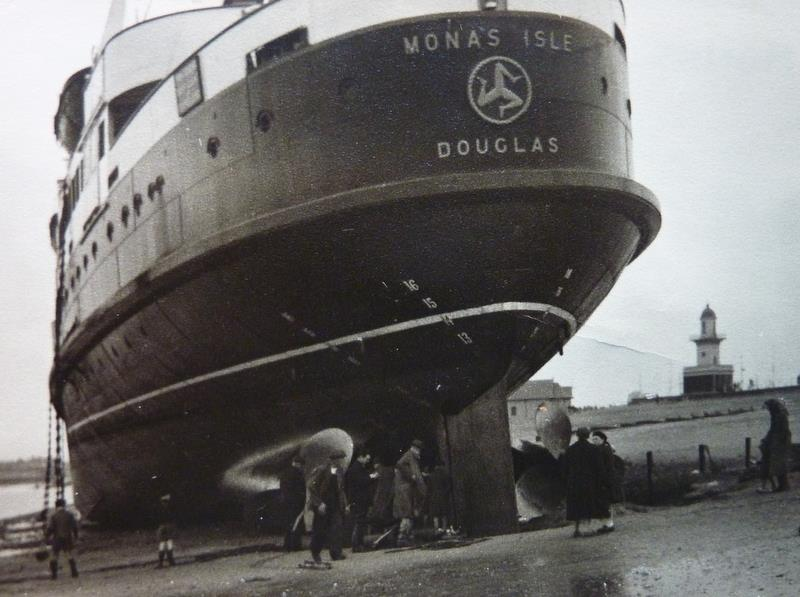
Mona's Isle aground at Fleetwood.

On 15 February 1964, she went aground at Peel and severely damaged her stern resulting in her having to be towed to Birkenhead for repairs.

In August 1971, Mona's Isle reopened the company's Fleetwood service from Douglas, but on 28 August 1974 made its last sailing to Heysham Port.

She appeared in a feature on Nationwide on 24 July 1974.

The 1980 season was her last, although she did appear in the film Chariots of Fire and took the 150th anniversary cruise around the Island. 27 August saw her final passenger sailing from Douglas to Llandudno. She was towed away to Dutch breakers on 30 October 1980.
