= SS Snaefell (1948) =

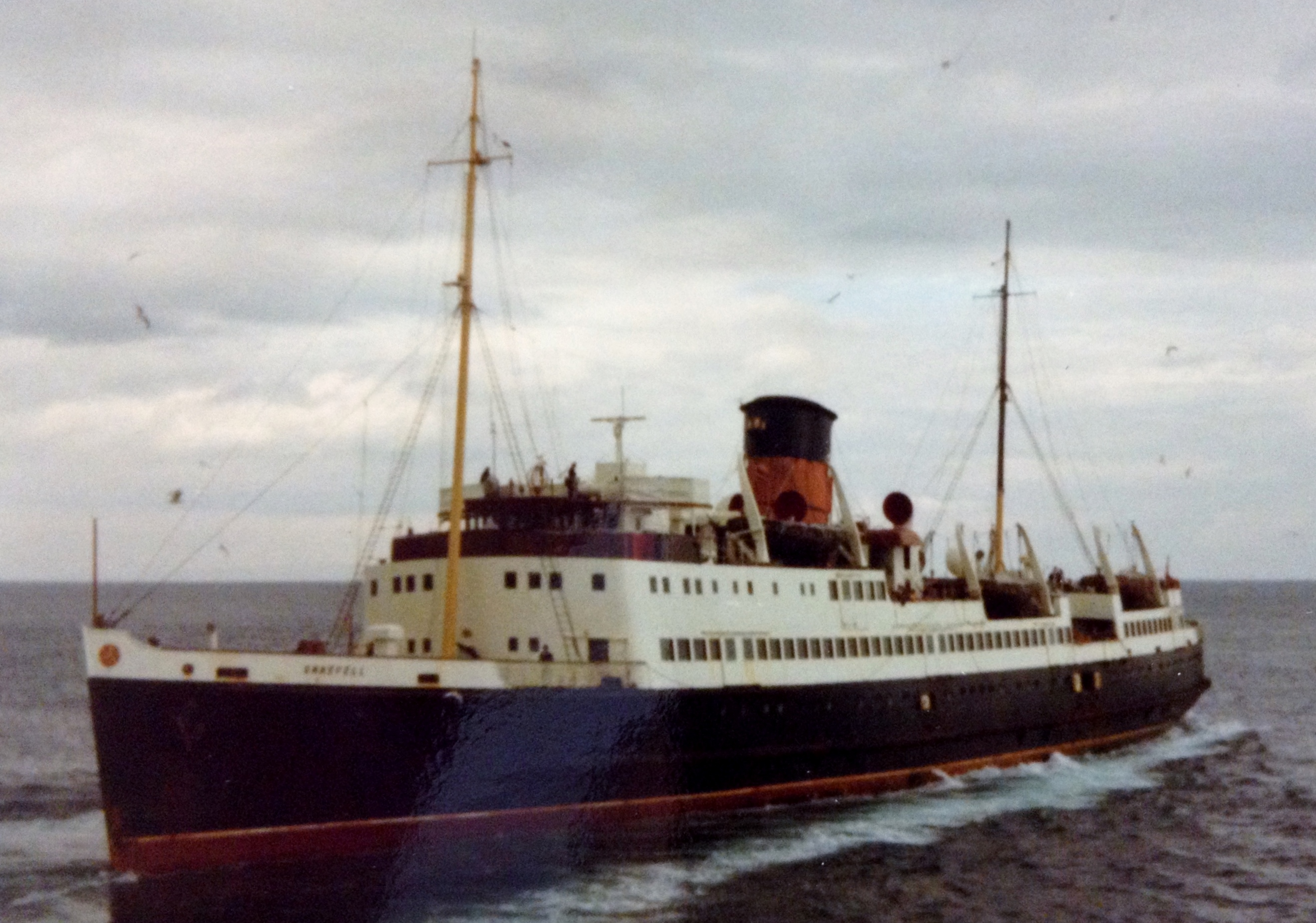
- Snaefell pictured departing Douglas, Isle of Man

History
- Name: Snaefell
- Owner: 1948–1978: IOMSPCo.
- Operator: 1948–1978: IOMSPCo
- Port of registry: Douglas, Isle of Man
- Builder: Cammell Laird
- Cost: £504,448
- Yard number: 1192
- Launched: 11 March 1948
- Maiden voyage: 24 July 1948
- In service: July 1948
- Out of service: August 1978
- Identification: IMO number: 5332551; Code Letters M A V K
- Fate: Acquired by the Rochadale Metal Recovery Company, and scrapped at Blyth, 1978.

General characteristics
- Tonnage: 2,489 GRT
- Propulsion: Steam turbine driven screw-propellers
- Speed: 21.5 knots (24.7 mph)

TSS Snaefell V - the fifth ship in the company's history to bear the name - was a passenger vessel operated by the Isle of Man Steam Packet Company from 1948 to 1978. Her purchase cost was £504,448.

== Dimensions ==
Snaefell had a registered tonnage of 2489 GRT, but otherwise her dimensions, speed, horsepower and crew accommodation were similar to her three predecessors; Tynwald, Mona's Queen and King Orry.

== History ==
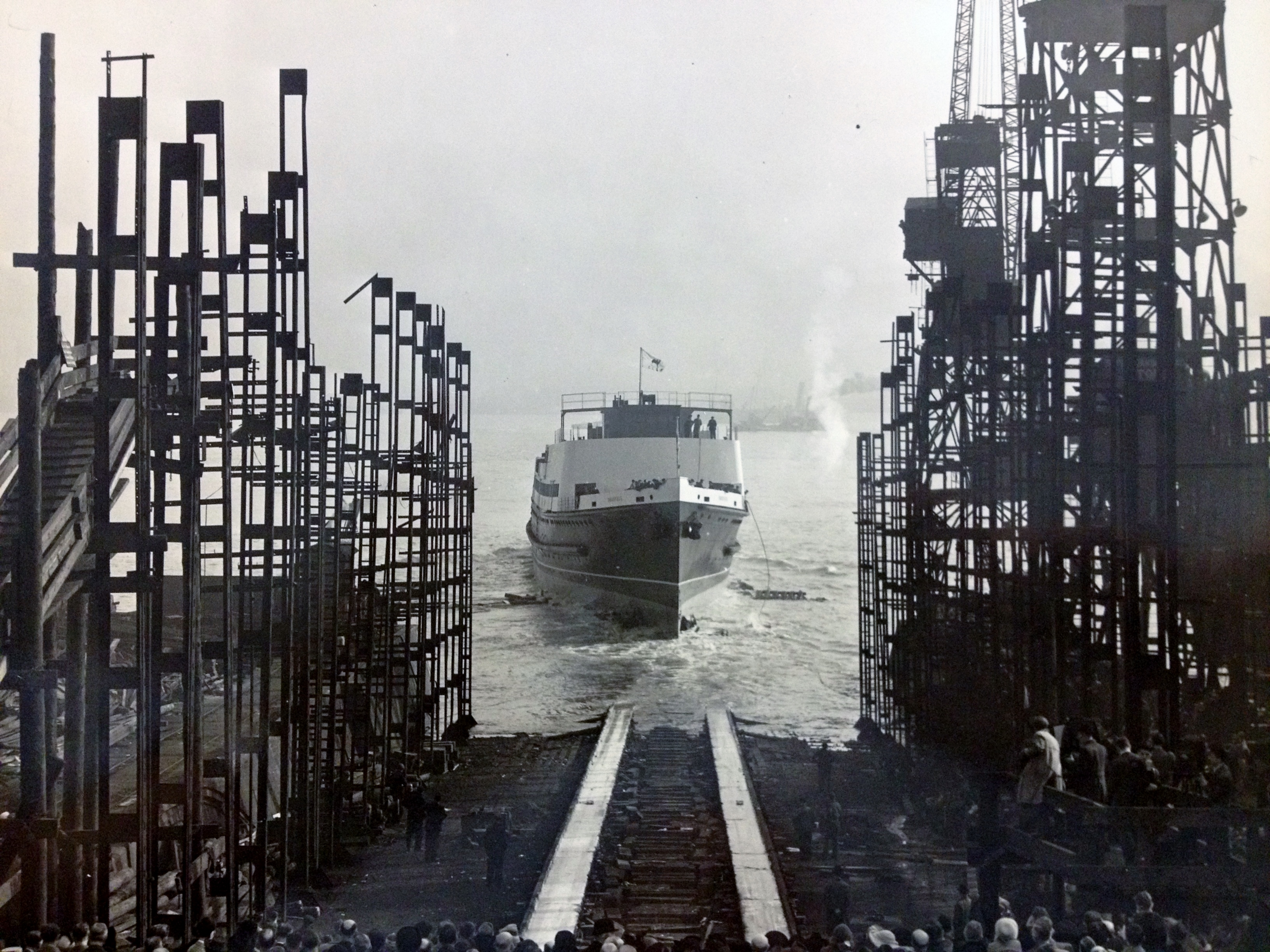
Snaefell is launched at Birkenhead 11 March 1948.

She was built at Cammell Laird, as the fourth of six ships - the six sisters - delivered by the company between 1946 and 1955 at a cost of £504,448 (equivalent to £23,169,414 as of 2023),. Snaefell was launched by Mrs J. R. Quayle on Thursday, 11 March 1948. Upon her completion she underwent her sea trials on 19 & 20 July of that year, and made her maiden voyage from Liverpool to Douglas on 24 July.

== Service life ==
Snaefell and her younger sister Mona's Isle were the last ships on the company's Heysham-Douglas service when it closed towards the end of August 1974.

Apart from an accident when she fouled her anchor off Llandudno in July 1976 and consequently missed a sailing, Snaefell enjoyed an efficient and uneventful career.

However, the predominance built up by the Steam Packet's car ferries in the 1970s, made it sensible to withdraw another traditionally designed ship.

== Disposal ==
Snaefell made her final sailing from Douglas on August Bank Holiday Monday, 1977, and was then laid up in Bidston Dock, Birkenhead. Following her withdrawal from service, she was sold to the Rochdale Metal Recovery Co. for scrap in 1978, and in November of that year, she was taken under tow to Blyth for breaking up.

== Trivia ==
The ship's bell from the Snaefell was salvaged by a former member of her ship's company upon whose death it was passed down to his son who retains it as part of a private collection in St John's, Isle of Man.

Six of Snaefell's beautiful portholes were also salvaged and to this day they live on in a 1937 River Thames tug called 'Swallow'. These large bronze portholes were fitted into Swallow during her refurbishment during 1979 as a replacement to her smaller portholes. Swallow is registered on the National Historic Ships Record. www.swallowthamestug.co.uk

== Gallery ==
RMS Snaefell
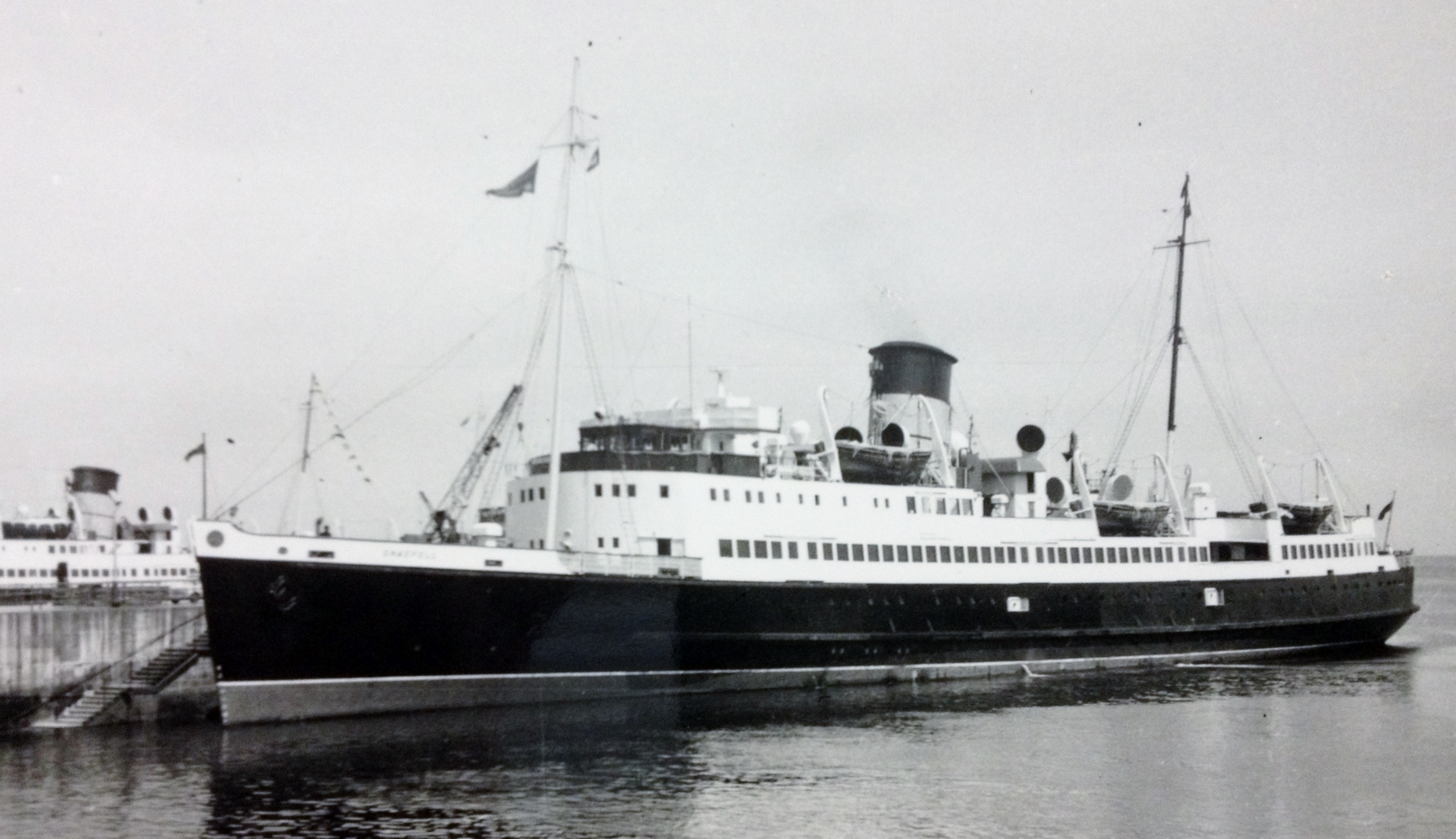
Snaefell pictured berthed at the King Edward VIII Pier, Douglas

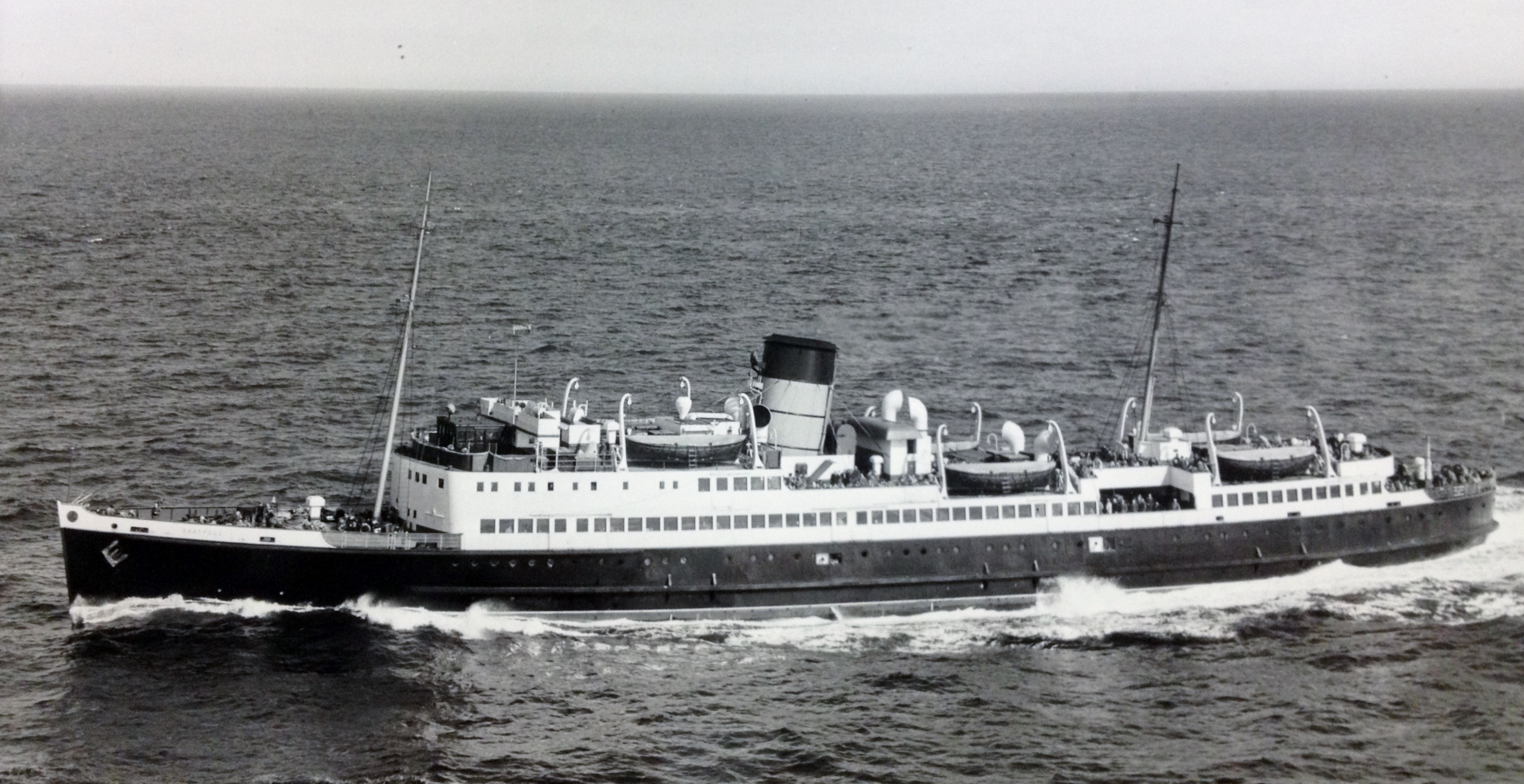
Snaefell in Steam Packet service
