= Orit (disambiguation) =

Orit (אורית) is a Hebrew language feminine given name.

Orit may also refer to:

- Orit, the Beta Israel name (he:אורית) for the Octateuch
- Ibrahim Orit, Ugandan footballer
- ORIT, ICFTU Inter American Regional Organisation of Workers
