= Ori (given name) =

- Gender: Male, Female

Origin
- Word/name: Hebrew
- Meaning: My light

Ori (Hebrew: אורי) is a gender-neutral Hebrew given name, which means "my light”. Also a name from the Hebrew Bible (Isaiah chapter 60). A female name with a similar meaning and sound is Orit (meaning "A small light"). Notable people with the name Ori include:

- Ori Biton (born 1987), Israeli footballer
- Ori Elon (born 1981), Israeli writer and filmmaker
- Ori Gersht (born 1967), Israeli photographer
- Ori Kaplan (born 1969), Israeli musician
- Ori Orr (born 1939), Israeli former general and politician
- Ori Pfeffer (born 1975), Israeli actor
- Ori Reisman (1924–1991), Israeli painter
- Ori Shitrit (born 1986), Israeli football player
- Ori Sivan (born 1963), Israeli director and screenwriter
- Ori Uzan (born 1978), Israeli football assistant manager and former player
- Ori Yogev (born 1960), Israeli businessman

== See also ==
- Ori (disambiguation)
