= Mona's Queen =

Five ships of the Isle of Man Steam Packet Company have borne the name Mona's Queen.

- SS Mona's Queen (1852) (1853–1880) Paddle steamer
- SS Mona's Queen (1885) (1885–1929) Paddle steamer
- SS Mona's Queen (1934) (1934–1940) pre-World War II passenger steamer; lost when she struck a mine off Dunkirk on 29 May 1940
- SS Mona's Queen (1946) (1946–1962) second of the six sisters; converted to cruise ship, Fiesta; scrapped in 1981
- MV Mona's Queen (1971) (1972–1995) first diesel-engined car/passenger ferry in the fleet;third of four car ferries; sold to MBRS Lines, Manila, Philippines; scrapped in 2008 at Alang

(dates of construction and service with IOMSPCo)
