= Poor laws of the Isle of Man =

The poor laws of the Isle of Man refer to the legislation relating to poor relief passed on the Isle of Man during the 19th century.

The Isle of Man, in contrast to neighbouring Britain, did not adopt an English style scheme of poor relief (see Tudor Poor Laws) and instead, prior to the Napoleonic Wars, relied on a system of charitable work undertaken by friendly societies and charitable donations collected by each parish church. The novel The Deemster also describes a system of house-to-house begging on the island. When this system of voluntary donations proved ineffective, a committee of enquiry was formed to consider reform. An Act of Tynwald established a Home for the Poor in 1889.
