= Rozin =

Rozin is a surname. Notable people with the surname include:

- Danny Rozin (born 1961), Israeli-American artist
- Orit Rozin (born 1959), Israeli historian
- Paul Rozin (born 1936), American psychologist
- Špela Rozin (born 1943), Slovenian actress
- Yehoshua Rozin (1918–2002), Israeli basketball coach
