= Ory =

Ory or ORY may refer to:

== People ==
- Ory (surname)
- Ory Dessau, 21st century Israeli art curator and critic
- Ory Okolloh, 21st century Kenyan activist, lawyer and blogger
- Ory Shihor (born 1967), Israeli pianist

== Other uses ==
- the title character of Le comte Ory, an 1828 opera written by Gioachino Rossini
- ORY, IATA airport code for Paris Orly Airport, south of Paris, France
- ory, ISO 639-3 code for the Oriya language

== See also ==
- Ori (disambiguation)
- Orry (disambiguation)
