= The Deemster =

1887 novel by Hall Caine

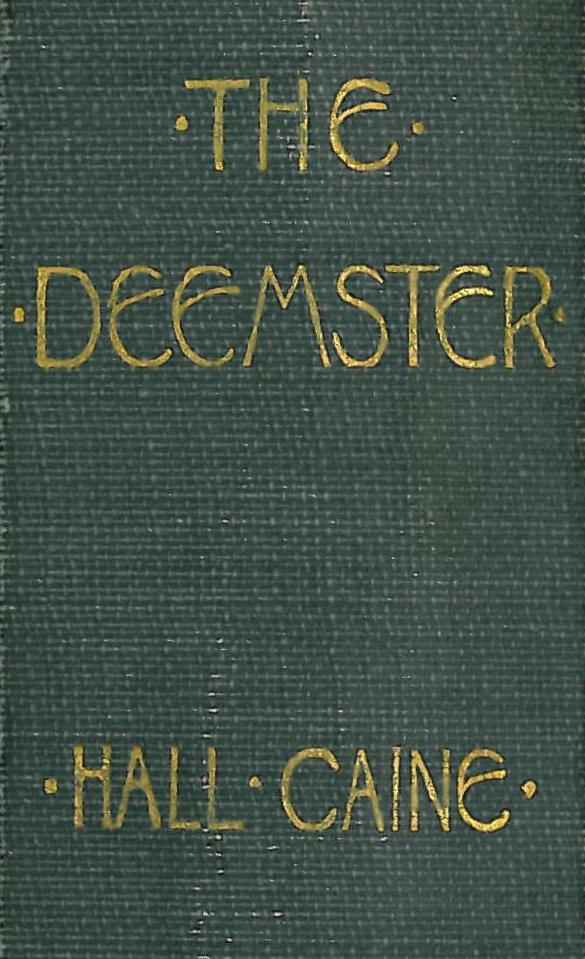
- Spine title
- Author: Hall Caine
- Language: English
- Publisher: Chatto & Windus
- Publication date: 1887
- Publication place: UK
- Media type: Print (hardcover)
- Pages: 365 pp (1921 edition)

The Deemster is a novel by Hall Caine published in 1887, considered to be the first 'Manx novel'. It was Caine's third novel, the second to be set in the Isle of Man and it was his first great success. The plot revolves around the reckless actions of Dan Mylrea and the exile and atonement that follow.

== Background ==
Early in his career, Hall Caine was acting as literary secretary to Dante Gabriel Rossetti, and it was he who suggested that he write a novel set on the Isle of Man. However, it was not for another five years that Caine began to work on The Deemster. Having conceived of the plot outline, Caine wrote to Hugh Stowell Brown and then his brother, T. E. Brown, to get their opinions. On 3 October 1886 Caine wrote to the Manx poet:

I remember that your brother Hugh did something to dissuade me from tackling Manxland in any sort of work. He did not think the readers of novels would find the island at all interesting, and he was sure that the local atmosphere was not such as would attract them. I thought over this a good deal, and decided, I must say, against your brother's judgment. [...] In the first place, the island has excellent atmosphere. It has the sea, a fine coast on the west, fine moorland above; it has traditions, folk-talk, folk-lore, a ballad literature, and no end of superstition – and all these are very much its own.

Brown's response on 14 October was blunt on the question of the novel's setting:

It could not possibly be placed in the Isle of Man, [...] the stage is inadequate for your romance; [...] [Your story] is strong and vital; but the Isle of Man sinks beneath it. [...] And as for an epic – just write the words, 'A Manx Epic' and behold the totally impossible at once!

Caine ignored their advice but did adapt the plot and characters to some of T.E. Brown's suggestions. He also sought the advice of two other Manxmen, A.W. Moore and Sir James Gell, particularly on the legal background of the novel. Having assembled his materials, Caine wrote the novel at his house in Bexley in the space of only seven months, a feat made possible by his recycling material from his 1885 novella, She's All The World To Me, in particular the central scene of Ewan's body floating back to shore. Caine visited the Isle of Man for a week in August to check the locations of some scenes in the novel and by September the novel was ready to go to the publisher. In financial need, Caine sold the copyright to Chatto & Windus for £150, signing the contract on 27 September 1887. Unfortunately for Caine, the terms of the contract meant that he did not gain the wealth of royalties when the book became a best-seller upon its release in November. Indeed, in 1921 when Caine wanted to release his Collected Works through a different publisher, he would have to pay £350 to Chatto & Windus for the rights to The Deemster.

== Plot ==
=== Childhood and youth (I to XVI) ===
Bishop's Court Dan Mylrea's childhood home

The novel is set in the late 17th and early 18th centuries.

Thorkell Mylrea buys himself into becoming a Deemster (or judge) on the Isle of Man. He then uses his influence to have his brother, Gilcrist, appointed Bishop, but Gilcrist disappoints him in being good, pious and beyond bribery. In contrast to their father, the Deemster's children, Ewan and Mona, grow up to become a conscientious and diligent priest and a good, caring woman. In contrast, without a strong hand to admonish him, the Bishop's son, Dan, grows up to become "thoughtless, brave, stubborn", likeable but unreliable. The cousins, Mona and Dan, come to fall in love.

Dan becomes a fisherman, his father funding the purchase of the boat. However, after only one season Dan is in debt due to the amount of time and money he has spent in the pub with his fishermen friends. Dan forges Ewan's name as surety on a loan. When he inevitably defaults on the payments, the Bishop comes to learn of the loan and, although Ewan tries to claim the signature is his, the Bishop casts his son Dan out. Ewan determines that he can no longer accept Dan as a friend, and he asks him to not see his sister, Mona, any more. To cover his shame and to try and hide from his failings, Dan again descends to his boisterous ways.

=== Crime (XVII to XX) ===
Dejected and depressed, Dan confounds the ban and goes to see Mona. The Deemster's maid, Kerry, has a vision of Dan in Mona's room, which the Deemster passes on to his son, saying that Dan is having an affair with Mona. Ewan confronts Mona but, through a failure of communication, she "admits" that she has feelings for Dan. Understanding that Mona has been "compromised", Ewan seeks out Dan to revenge her lost honour.

Ewan confronts Dan and they ascend Orris Head, a cliff top over the sea. On the summit, they ensure that neither can get away by tying their two belts buckled together around their waists. They fight with knives until Dan eventually cuts the belt and Ewan falls backwards over the cliff. Ewan dies on the rocks below.

=== Conviction (XXI to XXXVI) ===
After collecting Ewan's body and taking it to his fisherman's hut, Dan goes to confess to Mona. She cannot hold the murder of her brother against him, because she loves him. She tells Dan that he must hand himself in to atone for his crime. However, upon returning to the hut, he finds that the crew of his fishing boat have found the body there. In shock he allows himself to be taken with them as they take the body out to sea to dispose of it. However, when they throw the body into the sea, it miraculously escapes its weighted sheet and floats back to shore. This Dan takes as a sign of God's will, and so he steers the ship back to shore. But, once on land and taking a shortcut to the Deemster's house to hand himself in, Dan falls down a mineshaft, from which he is unable to escape until the next morning.

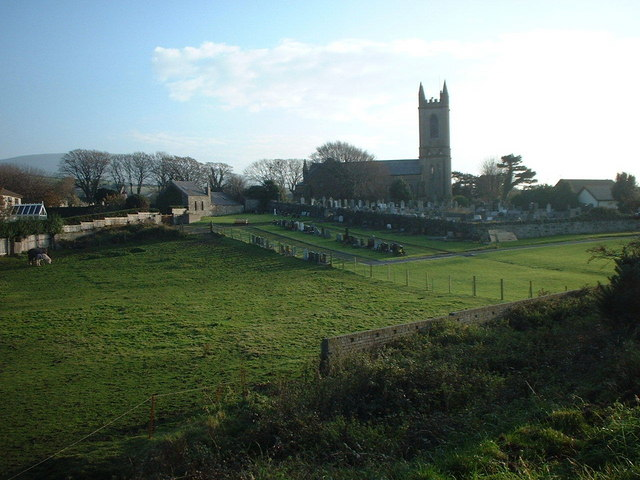
Kirk Michael, where Ewan Mylrea comes to be buried

Ewan's body comes ashore and is buried within hours at the Deemster's superstitious bidding. The Bishop is brought various pieces of evidence that show for certain that his son is the perpetrator. The fishermen have meanwhile returned home but, under the suspicion of the coroner, they flee into the mountains.

Having climbed out of the mineshaft, Dan hands himself in to the Deemster in the Ramsey courthouse, from where he is taken to Peel Castle to await trial. Imprisoned in the castle, Dan refuses his father's offer of escape. However, while sleeping, Dan is abducted by the fishermen, who fear that he will give evidence against their part in the disposal of Ewan's body. They take Dan to a deserted mine in the mountains, where they try Dan and find him guilty of endangering their lives. They sentence Dan to death.

Meanwhile, the Deemster's maid, Kerry, has another vision, of Dan in danger on the mountain. The vision is transferred to Mona and she then sets off with the Deemster's men to the site of the vision. They arrive just in time to save Dan from being shot by the fishermen.

At the trial which follows, the fishermen are set free, as there is not enough evidence against them. As a resident of the Bishop's Barony, Dan is then tried by his own father. The sentence is for Dan to be "cut off from the land of the living", i.e. condemned to exile within the island:

“Henceforth let him have no name among us, nor family, nor kin. […] When his death shall come, let no man bury him. Alone let him live, alone let him die, and among the beasts of the field let him hide his unburied bones.”

=== Exile (XXXVII to XLIII) ===
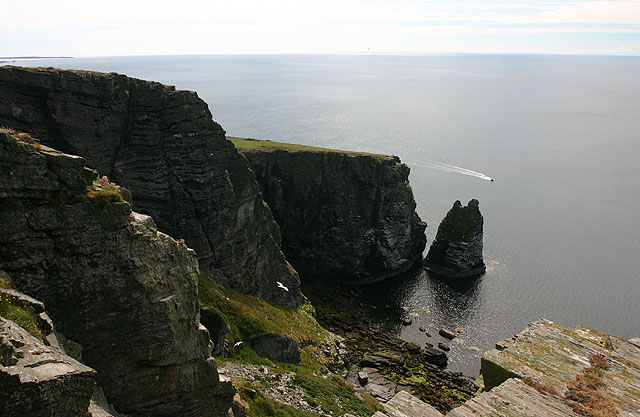
The view from the Chasms, the site of Dan's home during his exile

Dan travels to the very south of the island, where he takes up a solitary life of hunting, fishing and farming. He progresses through stages of bitterness and loneliness, trying and failing to flee from the sentence through activity and even an attempt to emigrate to Ireland. He makes his home in a hut near Cregneash, and comes to be thought dead by the rest of the island, as two men mistake a homeless person's dead body for his own. Dan becomes increasingly close to nature; and to retain his humanity he takes up speaking again, in the only way that would not endanger his sanity: by repeating the one prayer he remembers, at sunrise and sunset each day on the hill overlooking the village of Cregneash.

Shortly after a period of heavy rain followed by strong sun, there are signs of distress on the island: fishing boats do not put out to sea, carts do not go to market, people are ascending to the mountains. Then a storm causes a shipwreck, and a survivor seeks refuge in Dan's hut. As he comes in and out of consciousness, the man tells Dan that he is a priest from Ireland come to help stop the sweating sickness which grips the island. Before the priest dies, Dan promises that he will take the priest's place and go to the Bishop to instruct the people how to halt the sickness.

=== Atonement (XLIV to XLV) ===
Dan, taken for the Irish priest, directs the people of the west and north of the island how to drive out the dampness that causes the sickness. Dan is called to his dying uncle's bedside, where the former Deemster admits his sin of having driven Ewan to the confrontation with Dan; only after this he realises Dan's true identity. He goes to meet his father and they are reconciled. With the sickness defeated, Dan returns to his hut near Cregneash without having seen Mona, preferring solitude to the new-found adulation of the Manx people. However, by this time he has fallen ill and is close to death when Mona arrives, having followed him south with the official invitation to become Deemster. At last they are reunited, and she spends his last few minutes with him as he says his prayer once more, with her help, ending by asking God to "deliver us from evil, Amen."

== Publication and reception ==
Between May and November 1887 the novel was serialised weekly in the Dundee Evening Telegraph as The Doomster or Cut off from the people and in the Sheffield Weekly Telegraph as The Deemster: A Romance of the Purple Island. The novel became an enormous success upon its release in November 1887, so much so that Punch Magazine was soon to dub it "The Boomster". There were to be more than 50 editions of the book in English, as well as translations into French, German, Dutch, Danish, Swedish, Russian, Spanish, Finnish and Czech.

The book was well received in the press, being praised for attributes such as its "childlike purity, in its passionate simplicity". Upon Caine's first visit to America in 1895, the American press commented on the novel that "By its setting in the Isle of Man it opened up a new domain in literature as surely as Scott, Dickens and Thackeray had in their day."

After an initial period of apparent ignorance of the novel, the Manx audience became aware of it and was in "uproar". The tone of this is perhaps shown by the former Bishop of the island noting that, with regard to this and Caine's next novel, The Manxman, "my soul revolts from such a travesty of Island life.” In contrast, T. E. Brown, having previously advised Caine against setting the novel on the island, came to refer to the book as "little short of a masterpiece".

Your story fits the Isle of Man like a lid to a box. [...] I have but to lift the alabaster box of precious ointment, and up leaps the genuine Manx perfume, so that the house is filled with the savour thereof. [...] Whether it's the blood in you, or the poet and diviner, you know all about it, you need not that any should tell you concerning Man. for you know what is Man, and that in two senses.
[...] 'The Deemster' will live in the literature of the English nation, their own descendants abashed and wondering, and asking what their fathers meant by an indifference so stupid and so unaccountable. Of course I can see that the year 1887 must always be an epoch in Manx history, the year 'The Deemster’ was published.

The novel also brought adoration and endorsement from the leading writers and public figures of the day. Bram Stoker, for instance, wrote an introduction to a later edition of the novel. Caine's fellow contemporary novelist, George Gissing read the novel in February 1888 and called it "better than I anticipated...some really strong romantic writing in it...feeble characterization". In August 1902 King Edward VII made an unannounced visit to the Isle of Man to have Hall Caine show him the locations of the novel, such as Bishopscourt.

Critical concerns about the novel, when expressed, tended to concentrate on the perceived negativity or dark side of the novel. This is shown in a letter written to Caine by Wilkie Collins on 15 March 1888:

For a long time past, I have read nothing in contemporary fiction that approaches what you have done here. [...] When you next take up your pen, will you consider a little whether your tendency to dwell on what is grotesque and violent in human character does not require some discipline? [...] your power as a writer sometimes misleads you, as I think, into forgetting the value of contrast. The grand picture which your story presents of terror and grief wants relief. Individually and collectively, there is variety in the human lot. We are no more continuously wretched than we are continuously happy. Next time, I want more humour, [...] More breaks of sunshine in your splendid cloudy sky will be a truer picture of nature-and will certainly enlarge the number of your admiring readers.

== Locations ==
The beach near Orrisdale Head, the apparent summit where Ewan Mylrea falls to his death on the rocks.

- Bishop's Court, Michael: The home of the Bishop, Gilcrist Mylrea, and Dan's childhood home.
- Ballamona Farm: The sites of the two Mylrea family homes. This may be based upon the farm Ballamona Mooar, located 6 km NE of Kirk Michael, a short distance from The Cronk on the edge of the Curraghs and near the sea. It is a short distance from Ballamona Beg, coinciding with Caine's narrative. Ballamona was the name of a treen (historical subdivision of a parish) in that area, and is derived from balley ny moaney ("farm by the turf").
- The Three Legs of Man pub: Where Dan is found "roistering" with his fishermen friends. This is almost certainly the Mitre pub in Kirk Michael, as is made clear when he passes the pub immediately upon leaving Ewan's funeral in the churchyard nearby.
- 'Orris Head': The location of the fight between Dan and Ewan, where Ewan falls to his death upon the rocks below. This is Orrisdale Head, although the reality is some way from Caine's description: the "head" is on a straight stretch of coastline, and the "summit" is an indistinct rise above the rest of the sandy cliffs along the coastline.
- Peel Castle: The location of Dan's first imprisonment, from where the fishermen abduct him.
- Disused mining hut: The site of the final showdown between Dan and the fishermen, where his life is saved at the last by Mona and the authorities. This disused mine exists and is clearly described in the novel to be where, today, the Millennium Way crosses Sulby River (near its source), to the south-west of Snaefell.
- Castle Rushen, Castletown: The location of Dan's and the fishermen's second imprisonment, and of Dan's trial.
- Tynwald Hill: The place where the sentencing of Dan Mylrea is announced.
- A hut near Cregneash: The eventual home of Dan during his exile. This is identified as being near the Chasms, overlooking the sea near the cliffs, and backing onto a hill, from the top of which Cregneash can be seen. This hill is almost certainly to be identified with that where a radio mast stands today.

== Quotes ==
- And together these shipwrecked voyagers on the waters of life sat and wept, and wondered what evil could be in hell itself if man in his blindness could find the world so full of it. [Chapter XXI]
- "Strange it is, and very pitiful,” he said, "that what we think in our weakness to be the holiest of our human affections may be a snare and a stumbling-block. Strange enough, surely, and very sad, that even as the hardest of soul among us all may be free from blame where his children stand for judgement, so the tenderest of heart may, like Eli of old, be swept from the face of the living God for the iniquity of his children, which he has not restrained. […]” [Chapter XXVI]
- I thought that I was leaving for ever the fair island of my home, with all that had made it dear in dearer days. Though it had turned its back on me since, and knew me no more, but had blotted out my name from its remembrance, yet it was mine, and the only spot of earth on all this planet – go whither I would – that I could call my own. [Chapter XXXIX]
- For what was it to me though the world was wide if the little place I lived in was but my own narrow soul? [Chapter XXXIX]
- The blind leading the blind that is seen here of passion by accident is seen everywhere that great tragedies are done. It is not the evil in man's heart more than the deep perfidy of circumstance that brings him to crime. [Chapter XX]

== Adaptations ==
Hall Caine adapted the novel for the stage with Wilson Barrett, who was to play the lead role of Dan. The play was entitled Ben-my-Chree (“Girl of my heart" in Manx), the name of Dan's boat in the novel, and it was Caine's first foray into writing for the stage. It opened at the Princess's Theatre on Oxford Street, London, on 17 May 1888, and despite initially dubious reviews it proved to be a great success. The adaptation made substantial changes to the novel, particularly at the ending, which many concessions for the sake of melodrama:

The play ends with Mona protesting her innocence on a charge of immoral conduct when Dan appears unbidden. He corroborates the maiden's oath but by speaking, he sacrifices his own life, having been sentenced to life-long silence on pain of death if he breaks it. Mona dies of shock, the Governor is handed over to the police for laying false evidence and Dan throws himself across his sweetheart's body while waiting for the hangman.

After falling out with Barrett, eventually leading to legal action, Caine came to rewrite another version of the novel for the stage, now entitled, The Bishop's Son. It was taken on tour in 1910, including a performance in Douglas, the capital of the Isle of Man, on 15 August, at which Caine delivered a rapturously-received pre-performance speech. The play eventually opened in London at the Garrick Theatre on 28 September 1910, with Bransby Williams in the lead role.

The novel was made into a silent film by the Arrow Film Corporation in America in 1917. Hall Caine's son, Derwent Hall Caine, and Marian Swayne were cast in the lead roles. The film was released in England in March 1918, when Hall Caine organised "a stellar first night audience" for the screening in aid of war charities. Caine had invited the Prime Minister, Lloyd George, but he politely declined the invitation.

== Trivia ==
Bishop Wilson, the model for Gilcrist Mylrea

- In Manx history there were two Daniel Mylreas (or Daniel McYlreas) from Ballaugh, the parish of the family home in The Deemster. The father was Deemster, 1734–57, and he used his influence to have his youngest son, William, appointed Archdeacon in 1760. Both Daniel and William were in opposition to the island's Bishop at the time, Bishop Wilson. Daniel's older son and namesake followed him in becoming Deemster, from 1758 to 1775.
- Bishop Wilson is clearly the model for Bishop Mylrea, with Caine using many of the stories attached to Wilson in the novel. Bishop Wilson was suggested to Caine as an "epoch-making personage" by T. E. Brown in their correspondence.
- Hommy-beg ("little Tommy" in Manx, an example of lenition, a type of initial consonant mutation), the name of the Deemster's servant, was also the nickname used for Caine by his Manx grandmother.
- Gilcrist Mylrea's lowly position at the University of Cambridge as a sizar is similar to what T. E. Brown had experienced as a servitor at Oxford.
- The wedding of Thorkell Mylrea is heavily based on Chapter 17, "Manners and Customs", of Joseph Train's history of the Isle of Man.
- Gilcrist's departure on the regular sailing of the King Orry to Liverpool is anachronistic, as most sailings from the island went to Whitehaven at the time, and the name King Orry reflects that of a 19th-century Steam Packet, whereas 17th and 18th century packets were usually given names like the Duke of Athol.
- The name of Dan's boat, and later the title of the first stage production of the novel, Ben-my-Chree, was and is a regular name for passenger boats of the Isle of Man Steam Packet Company, the first of which was launched in 1845.
- Shortly after the novel's publication, Caine received a letter from a man on the Isle of Man who told him that he had known the fictional main character, Dan Mylrea, from childhood and had always warned him of his ways. The correspondent even said that he still had the knife with which Dan had fought with Ewan Mylrea.
