= Orit =

Orit (אורית) is a Hebrew language feminine given name. Notable people with this given name include:

- Orit Gadiesh
- Orit Noked
- Orit Strook
- Orit Wolf
- Orit Adato
- Orit Rozin
- Orit Bar-On
- Orit Ishay
- Orit Zamir
- Orit Zuaretz
- Orit Galili-Zucker
