= Eliahu Gat =

Israeli artist (1919–1987)

- אליהו גת
- Born: Eliahu Gulkowitz; 1919; Dokshytsy, Vitebsk Governorate Byelorussian SSR
- Died: 1987 (aged 67–68)
- Education: Beaux-Arts de Paris
- Occupation: Landscape painter
- Years active: 1949–1984

Eliahu Gat (Hebrew: אליהו גת; 1919–1987) was an Israeli landscape painter.

== Biography ==
Eliahu Gulkowitz (later Gat) was born in 1919 in the small town of Dokshitz in what is now Belarus, to a Lithuanian Jewish Zionist family. In 1926, the family resettled in Poland, where Gat attended a Polish gymnasium. In 1937, he immigrated to Mandate Palestine and studied architecture at the Technion in Haifa. From 1939 to 1942, he joined Kibbutz Nir Haim and Maoz Haim. During this period, he also worked as a dockhand and seaman in Haifa port. In 1942, he joined the British Army, serving in Palestine and North Africa until 1946. In 1945, while still a soldier, he studied for a year at Aharon Avni's painting studio. When he was transferred to Cairo, he enrolled in the Cairo Academy of Art, taking courses sponsored by the British Army. After his discharge, he painted at the Stematsky–Streichman studio. In 1948–1949, he served in the Israel Defense Forces.

== Artistic career ==
Gat was among the founders of the Group of Ten, which held its first exhibition in February 1951 at Beit HaOmanim in Tel Aviv, home of the Israeli Artists' Association. The group consisted of Gat, Elhanan Halperin, Shoshanah Levisohn, Ephraim Lifshits, Moshe Propes, Shimon Zabar, Dan Kedar, Claire Yaniv, Nissan Rilov and Zvi Tadmor—all graduates of the Stematsky–Streichman studio. The two participating sculptors were Shoshanah Heiman and David Polombo. The philosophy of the group was to paint the local Israeli scene realistically, as opposed to the abstract art and universalism of the New Horizons group.

== Influences ==
In 1952, Gat traveled to France on a government grant. He studied at the École nationale supérieure des Beaux-Arts under Souverbie, together with Michael Gross and Ori Reisman. Gat's letters from his sojourn in Paris testify to his artistic confusion and to his spiritual and physical tribulations: he said, “I thought I would paint a little in the evenings and bought a blue lamp, but so far I haven’t succeeded. You can understand the difficulties, after a day’s work, and especially in a room with no atmosphere, in addition to the confusion I feel about painting in general.” The artists he mentions in his letters, though notably disparate in style and approach, represent the divergences that were to mark Gat's own work in the future. He admired Bernard Buffet, a young artist who was then enjoying social and artistic success in Paris: Gat said, “By the way, Buffet is head and shoulders above everyone else. His exhibition was very impressive and he already has a following.” Another artist mentioned by Gat was Chaïm Soutine: Gat said, “Soutine, in terms of stature, is fit to stand side by side with the great classicists. . . . Mourjansky has promised me to Katia Granoff so that I can view fifteen Soutines. He is one of the artists I understand the least, but who impresses me the most. By the way, Israeli art suffers from Soutinism, but not of the healthy kind.” A trip to Spain and a visit to the Prado yielded the following impressions: “You walk round and round and each painting is better than the last. I could stay here for months and study. What a lightness of touch there is in the colour handling of Titian and Tintoretto; it is practically a sketch, and yet it is so deep. Some works could even be called Titian Impressionism—brushwork and light translucent layers of paint.” Gat's interest in Soutine and in the free impressionist approach of the venetian artists serves as an indication of his future artistic direction.

== “The Group of Ten” exhibitions / realism ==
In April 1953, Gat, together with others of the "Group of Ten” participated in an exhibition of drawings by young artists at the Tel Aviv Museum, and in the summer of 1953 the members of the group held an exhibition at the artists’ house in Tel Aviv. They were then called The Group of Nine. The group's image was then defined by its penchant for realism and by its self-presentation as an antithesis to ‘all for modernism,’ ‘abstractionism’ and ‘universalim in art’. “One of the “Nine” published an open letter in the press to the effect that “we are all committed to the idea that the way to achievement is through the adherence to reality, i.e., to our daily life in Eretz Israel. . . . We have floated in the heavens of so-called modernism (which is no longer modern anyway) and we are returning to the palpable earth.” The writer attacks the abstract: “An unhealthy atmosphere has pervaded many of our art circles, and escape from the real into the abstract and the cosmopolitan by obliterating any identifying feature of time or place . . . to adhere to that trend here in this country and in these times of acute social crisis is merely to copy obsolete things from an alien reality.” On formalism he says: “Our problems are not of creating forms, but of giving shape to a particular content. . . . We belong to this land, and we love it for better or worse. Why should we distort the image of the people we see and live with. . . . Why should we make mathematical calculations or formal trickery out of our landscape, cities, villages or maabarot, when they are of profound significance in their realistic forms?” The article was written from a distinctly class-conscious viewpoint: “The time has come to pay our debt to society, to transform art from a luxury, snob-value item for the elite, to a product for the masses. It is time for labourers, farmers and people of all social strata to come to a painting exhibition and like what they see and feel that it belongs to them.”

The writer concludes by opposing “New Horizons” and the “Group of Nine”: “Should you parachute a person into a ‘New Horizons’ exhibition, he would not know which country he had fallen into, nor the period of its art. Undefined and cosmopolitan, the works float beyond time and place, beyond life's problems.”

== Artistic style ==
Gat was enamoured of colours containing “Oriental” characteristics such as is prominent in Islamic decorative art. In the years following, though he continued to show his work in the exhibitions of the Group of Ten, his paintings became dark and monochromatic, composed of controlled light and dark contrasts. The forms were then delineated by heavy contour lines, and the composition was based on a plastic rhyming of lines and a repetition of vectors. Lines used in two planes, unifying near and far, emphasized the flatness of the depicted space. The artist tended toward a treatment of architectonic themes, such as the facades or roofs of houses, and, as strange as this may seem in light of the group’s ideology, his paintings became increasingly stylized and abstract. One influence in evidence is Gat's architectural background. Another is that of the French painter Souverbie, under whom he studied.

The transformation apparent in Gat's work during these years is better understood against the background of the shift in the attitude to abstractionism and modernism in the mid-1950s. The leftist ideology, which at the beginning of decade had preached an art engage, adherence to realism and a non-elitist and non-individualistic approach, lost much of its vitality (among other things due to the change in relationship of the "Progressive Culture" circle to the Soviet Union and the 1954 split in Mapam). A greater number of Israelis, including artists, traveled to Europe where they witnessed the popularity of abstract art. Art criticism and polemics, which now began to filter in from the West with greater frequency via journals and visiting art critics, reinforced this notion, The charisma of "New Horizons was such that from an oppositional fighting force in the early fifties it had evolved into an influential group not unpopular with the art establishment. With this in mind, the course of artists who began as realists but who, by the end of the 1950s, went over to the abstract, is more intelligible. The last exhibition of the Group of Ten took place in 1960 at the Tel Aviv Museum.

== Abstract Art / "Tazpit" ==
Gat's abstract painting from 1961/2 constitutes a sharp, unequivocal stylistic turnabout, an open departure from his work of the immediate past. He began experimenting with aquarelles on paper, based on random dabbing, a liquid effect and the spraying of paint. The compositions lack definite direction and have no reference to up, down, right or left. The only figurative notation is the existence of a central area, more intensive in relation to the periphery in terms of colour. The degree of abstraction in these paintings is greater than that achieved by many veteran Israeli abstractionists. The last works of this phase contain geometric forms reminiscent of rows of houses. In the same period Gat joined various organizations of abstract painters, the most important of which was that resulting in the "Tazpit" exhibition (Israeli painting and sculpture) at the Tel Aviv Museum in 1964. The "Tazpit" exhibition was born of a feeling that abstract artists lacked a central exhibition space in which to show their works. Among its initiators were artists who had recently returned to the country (Yigael Tumarkin), members of "New Horizons," members of the "Group of Ten" who had gone over to abstract art and others. The exhibition manifest challenged "the use of external impressions and an external depiction of objects and figures." It declared that "the obscuring of values, the 'return' to folkloristic localism, and the so-called hankering after 'Israeliness' would create a counter group of artists who, in contrast to nostalgic, touristic exotica and commercializing of Jewish consciousness, would search for pure plastic values appropriate to our times."

The paintings Gat showed in "Tazpit" were a first stage in his return to the figurative. Already in 1963, he exhibited what were called "abstract landscapes" at the Dugit Gallery in Tel Aviv. In them, the line of the horizon was very high or even absent (landscape without sky). Most of the paintings were inspired by Ein Kerem and Safed, arid landscapes penetrated here and there by paths which dictate the pictorial rhythm. Their texture is rich despite their predominantly monochromatic colour. The landscape becomes part of an encompassing form which, rather than relate to a particular subject, reconstructs nature. Its details become colour happenings, sprouting organically out of the paint. The different patches of the painting carry equal weight and project a uniform energy, a pictorial translation of the mountain's burning haze. The brushwork, applied in a wide smooth sweep or in short rhythmic dabs' provides the direction, kneads the material texture and creates the forms, all at the same time. At some points paint has been sprayed in a fashion similar to that in the abstract aquarelles, and spontaneous colour patches are added to the hasty weave of the brush, to create a vibrating, glowing and sensual texture of paint and earth. The technical and formal lessons of abstract painting, the result of many years of drawing in nature, to create a unity of feeling, painting and landscape painting. The critics (Yoav Bar El, Ha'aretz), evaluating these works' found in them distinctive local values, and an "explicit Israeli identity, the peace and dusty quiet of the country's landscape, " in the nature depictions. This phase in Gat's work, which continued until the late 1960s, gave expression to his deep need to combine the spontaneous, based on an "erotic" identification with the subject, with a controlled composition created from an accumulation of technical information, from a vocabulary comprising brushwork and colour combinations.

Whereas Zaritsky, Streichman and Stematsky use the landscape as a formal core from which lyrical abstract shapes grow, in Gat's abstract-like paintings the lyricism itself (the liquidity, the quivering of the brush) is born of the inspiration of the landscape. Unlike Zaritsky and Streichman, he remains umbilically tied to the landscape to the end of the painting process. In the 1970s and 1980s, Gat would try to separate between the different components of the painting – between the details of the landscape, between the figures and the landscape, between image and background – to try to remove them from the context of abstraction, from a system whose danger lies in its tendency to impose itself arbitrarily on reality. Rather than anchor his work in a method, he chose to utilize the experience of reality, i.e., to return to a kind of realism.

Gat's view of the process of painting as an adventure may explain his frequent reversals and shifts in direction. The exhaustion of a particular stage in his artistic development immediately spurs him to a change of approach.

== The realism of the 1970s and 1980s/ Landscapes ==
Gat's landscapes of the 1970s and 1980s represent the artist's familiar haunts: Safed, Zikhron Yaakov, the Jerusalem Hills, Sinai. The angle of vision is high so that the landscape extends flat and panoramic on the canvas with a very narrow strip of sky. This type of composition which is also found, as noted, in his work from the late 1950s, had crystallized in his "abstract landscapes" of the mid-1960s. Though rendered in an impressionist technique, Gat's landscapes are not picturesque. His mode of landscape depiction is that of the sublime. It expresses his intoxication with nature and infinity, with the emotional response to nature. The sense of freedom gained by the open landscape, the affinity with it, the yielding of the landscape to the artist, the mutual relationship between nature and the experiencing agent – these form the basis of Gat's artistic experience. The sun in Gat's paintings burns from within the earth, lending it its light. ("the light is in the earth, the sky is leaden, that's why I didn’t leave room for sky," he said).

== Color / Composition ==
Gat applies the impressionist principle that contrasting or complementary colors placed one beside the other in equal intensity radiate a strong, vibrating, multifaceted light. Gat is a "practical theorist" of color and is connected to the impressionist tradition which does not recognize black as color and translates the value contrast of light and shade into color differences. Such as red and blue or orange- red and ochre. His paintings demonstrate that colour is only a part of a color structure in which each component derives its meaning from the whole. Thus, for example he shows that blue and green can become warm colors in a given color environment.

Gat employs his concept of color to convey the blazing Mediterranean sun, the earth, from the sands and the flesh of the mountains. Heat is the Israel land factor in his works. The green surfaces of his canvases resemble oases' saturated shadows in a desert of fire. "I'm a painter of Israel's heat, not necessarily of its light'" he says. Gat adopts the harmonious synthetic color approach. By intentionally admixing strong colors to create a synthesis of contrasts ("in this country both the light and the shade are hot"), he joins an Israeli impressionist landscape tradition which developed in the thirties under the influence of French painting ("painting the landscape, we have no choice but to be impressionists" Menahem Shemi said at the time). The color contrasts in Gat's paintings also have an emotional quality. The express the painter's dynamic impression of the subject. The multiple rapid strokes, while conveying the dancing light, are also lines of rhythm, conveying not so much the rhythm of the landscape as the psychological rhythm of being moved by it. The line, rather than forming a structural foundation, constitutes a driving force, the embodiment of energy and movement in the painting process. It does not serve to separate areas; on the contrary, it unifies them with its vibration.the contour lines of the objects blend like arabesques in the general weave of the brushstrokes. Gat in both a colorist and a draftsman. The translucent air of Israel renders colors in a distance as strong as those near by, hence the colors are spread over the canvas in equal intensity. Thus Gat creates a uniform surface reminiscent of abstract painting which, in addition to its identification as a landscape having a spatial depth and linear perspective, constitutes yet another level of interpretation. Like in the abstract mode, Gat institutes a complex reworking of the canvas surface: opaque alongside transparent, dry with glowing, translucent and turbid, rough and smooth – all these qualities are distributed evenly over the canvas without a particular faithfulness to the depicted landscape. At the same time, Gat is not an advocate of the intellectual structuring of a composition. Everything flows in this paintings and, like in a free sketch, he preserves the heat of the pictorial process.

There is a close correlation between Gat and Monet's later painting in the garden of his home in Giverny, despite the fact that Gat's brushstrokes are "wilder" than those of Monet and he does not play with the translucence of objects or divide reality into units of color. Gat's work is also related to that of the Jewish artist Chaïm Soutine in whose works the objects and depicted landscape are in a state of turbulence and dramatized to the point of distortion. Gat's admitted affinity with the Jewish Ecole de Paris of the first decades of the century may provide the link between the two sources of Gat's identity: Jewishness and Israeli particularism. Gat was born in Eastern Europe where he spent his youth. After World War II he discovered that his family had perished in the Holocaust. Yet he also underwent the "Israeli experience" and saw himself as a member of the 1948 Arab–Israeli War generation.

== Interior-Exterior / Nudes-Still Lifes-Landscapes ==
The landscape, the common denominator of all the Gat's works, also provides the background for his nudes and still lifes. The principle informing Gat's nudes and still lifes is pantheism—the unification of all natural elements—flora, mountains, hills, people,—into a single vibrating whole. His vase with flowers, for example, painted in the 1960s, disappears into the ground as though woven into it. In the same period he painted a green nude in which one type of brushwork was used over the entire surface so that the body's contours dissolved into their surroundings. The same principle was applied to figurative paintings. Gat's nudes are characterized by a foreshortened reclining position which creates a perspective illusion of depth. The foreshortening precludes the classical aesthetic spread of the feminine curves. The figure is always recumbent, never engaged in any daily activity, and generally devoid of eroticism. The conquest of the woman is achieved, as with the landscape, through the act of painting. The flesh of the figure is treated similarly to the features of landscape which always, as noted, constitutes a background to the picture, and the same color principles are applied to both. There are instances where the nude is depicted as a continuation of the landscape, for example when a path seen through a window seems to travel into the room up to the body of reclining woman. Topographical features of the landscape echo in the lines of the female groin, a parallelism which reinforces the idea of the identity of woman and landscape. On the other hand, the geometric shape of the window frame emphasizes the rounded contours of the recumbent female figure. In some instances the window is represented as a mirror facing the figure and reflecting it. The landscape in Gat's painting becomes the true portrait of the woman. The nude and still life represent the artist's inner world, his "interior." They are staged as artistic subjects rather than as part to a daily authentic environment. This "interior" is very like an exterior. Gat's paintings do not contain actual exteriors. The indoor scenes are always represented close to the window-sill, tending to slide outwards, or even to form an integral part of the outside. Therein lies the message: the artist's inner world and nature are one and the same. His workshop, his life, his art and his desires, are all woven into nature. The landscape is not simply a visual subject but an essential component of his existence. In Gat's case, nudity constitutes a complement and interpretation of the landscape, its sensuality and its repose, and of the artist's erotic relationship to it.

== "Aclim" (Climate) ==
Gat was a founding member of "Aclim", which was organized in 1974. The group was established in the wake of the Yom Kippur War "to point to the necessity of raising the public's consciousness of its Israeli identity in all cultural spheres." Participants in the group's exhibitions until 1983 were: Gat, Rahel Shavit, Ori Reisman, Avram Rafael, Michael Gross, Hannah Levy, Tova Berlinski, Yechezkel Streichman, Avraham Mendel, Zvi Aldouby, Avraham Ofek, Ran Shehori, Hannah Megged, Shimon Avni, Hannah Evyatar, David Ben Shaul, Reuven Cohen, Zvi Tolkovsky, and Shimshon Holzman. Some participated in only one or two shows, others in most of the group's exhibitions. Eliahu Gat and Rachel Shavit were the guiding spirits of the group. The works were eclectic in style, the only feature common to all was the influence of the landscape or a component of the landscape on them. The group's rejection of a literary and mythological "Israeliness" and archaism on the one hand, and a universalistic and avant-garde approach on the other, recalls the ideology of the "Group of Ten".

== Awards and recognition ==
- In 1949, he won the Prize of the Fallen in the War of Independence, in memory of the sons of six artists who fell in 1948 Arab–Israeli War.
- In 1959, Histadrut Prize for Art.
- In 1972, the Ministry of Education and Culture Art Teachers Prize.
- In 1978, the Dizengoff Prize for Painting.

== Selected one-man exhibitions ==
- 1984: The Israel Museum, Jerusalem
- 1981: Art Gallery at Leivik House, Tel Aviv
- 1979: The Museum of Modern Art, Haifa
- 1978: Artists House, Jerusalem
- 1977: Visual Art Centre, Beer Sheva
- 1976: Katia Granoff Gallery, Paris
- 1975: Art Gallery at Leivik House, Tel Aviv
- 1973: Art Museum of Modern Art, Haifa
- 1972: Artists house, Holon
- 1970: Katz-Idan Gallery, Tel Aviv
- 1969: Kibbutz-Lim Gallery, Tel Aviv
- 1966: Dugit Gallery, Tel Aviv
- 1965: Museum Bat Yam
- 1964: Dugit Gallery, Tel Aviv, The Negev Museum, Beer Sheva
- 1963: Artists House, Tel Aviv
- 1960: Artists House, Jerusalem (together with Ephraim Lifshitz)
- 1958: The Tel Aviv Museum, Dizengoff House (together with Ephraim Lifshitz)

== Selected group exhibitions ==
- 1982: "Aclim", the Jerusalem Theatre, Jerusalem
- 1980: "Aclim", Art Gallery at Leivik House, Tel Aviv
- 1979: "Aclim", Mann Auditorium, Tel Aviv
- 1978: "Aclim", Tel Aviv Municipality House
- 1977: "Aclim", Goldman Art Gallery, Haifa
- 1977: "Aclim", Artists House, Tel Aviv
- 1977: "Aclim", Hirschberg Gallery, Boston
- 1976: "Aclim", The Jerusalem Theatre, Jerusalem
- 1976: "Aclim", Haifa University Library, Haifa
- 1975: "4 Israeli Painters - Aclim," Ansdell Gallery, London
- 1975: "Aclim", Museum of Modern Art, Eilat
- 1975: "Aclim", Hazrif Gallery, Beer Sheva
- 1974: "Aclim", Artists House, Jerusalem
- 1974: "Aclim", Mann Auditorium, Tel Aviv
- 1974: "Aclim", Museum of Modern Art, Haifa
- 1973: "From Landscape to Abstraction From Abstraction to Nature", the Israel Museum, Jerusalem
- 1973: "Homage" (or Tribute), Artists House, Jerusalem
- 1964: "Tazpit", Tel Aviv Museum, Helena Rubinstein Pavilion
- 1956: "The Group of Ten", Mishkan Le Omanut, Museum of Art, Ein Harod
- 1956: "The Group of Ten", Tel Aviv Museum, Dizengoff House
- 1956: "The Group of Ten", Marc Chagall Artists House, Haifa
- 1956: "General Exhibition - Art in Israel", Tel Aviv Museum, Dizengoff House, Tel Aviv
- 1955: "The Group of Ten", Artists House, Tel Aviv
- 1953: "The Group of Nine", Artists House, Tel Aviv "Black On White," Tel Aviv Museum, Dizengoff House
- 1952: "General Exhibition - Art in Israel," Tel Aviv Museum, Dizengoff House

== See also ==
- Visual arts in Israel
