= Ori Reisman =

Israeli painter (1924–1991)

Ori Reisman אורי ריזמן
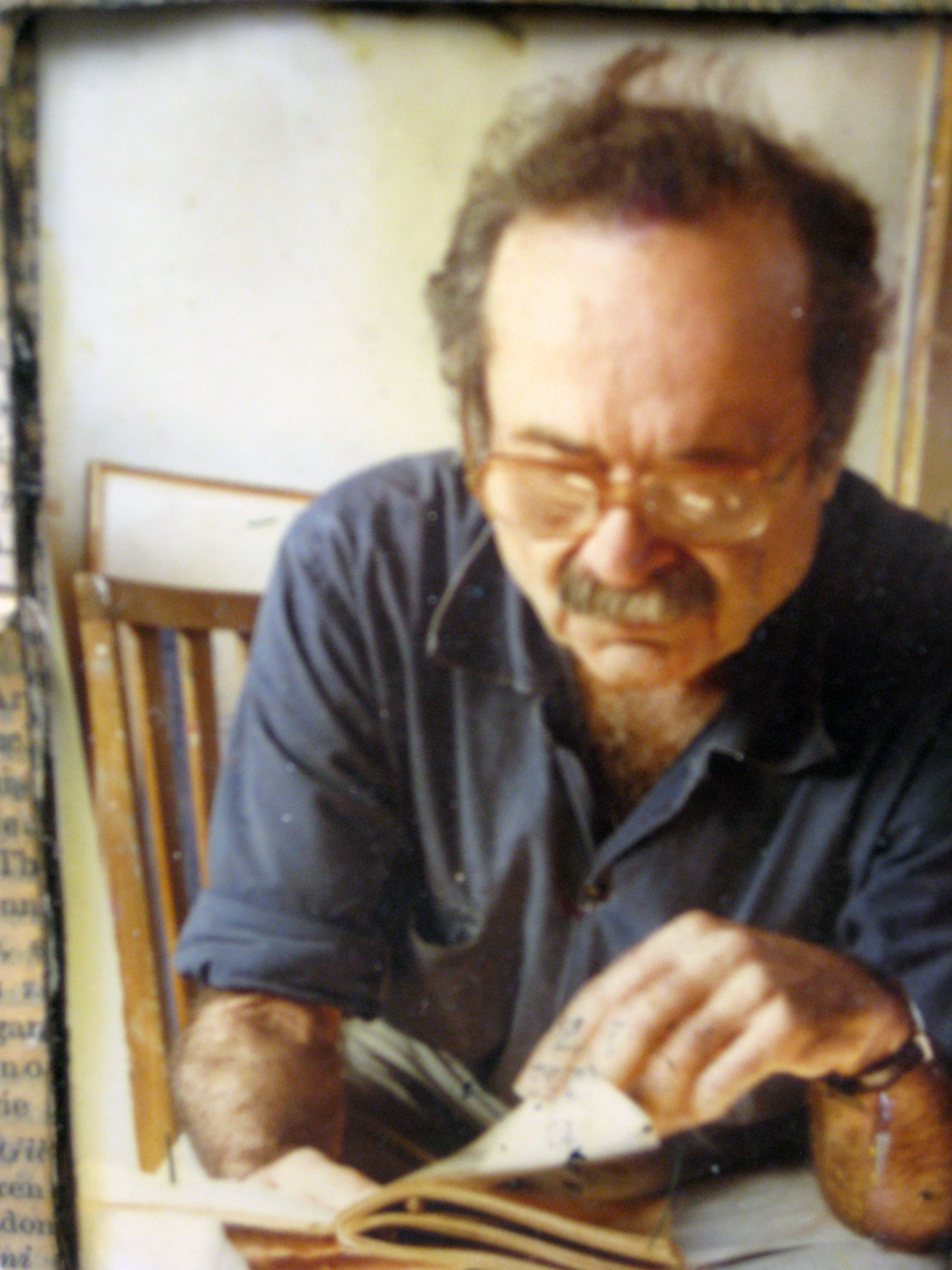
- Ori Reisman
- Born: 1924; Tel Yosef
- Died: 1991 (Aged 67)
- Education: École des Beaux-Arts, Paris
- Known for: Painting

Ori Reisman (Hebrew: אורי ריזמן; 1924–1991) was an Israeli painter.

== Biography ==
Ori Reisman was born in kibbutz Tel Yosef and grew up in the British Mandatory Palestine Jerusalem and Tel Aviv. Born to Batsheva and Nisan Reisman, He was one of the first Israeli children to be given the modern name Ori. When he was six months old his family moved to the Legion Headquarters in Jerusalem. His mother joined the Labor Legion Studio Theater, which formed the basis for the Ohel Theater, as an actress.

Later in his life he moved to France for a period of two years and when he returned to Tel Aviv he began studying at the art studio of Yitzhak Frenkel Frenel.

After graduating he started his training at Kibbutz Yagur where he met Mazal Hamdi and they married. Mazal was a member of a Yemenite Jerusalemite family whom its members and their surroundings Reizman often painted (the synagogue paintings, Jerusalem alleys, etc.).

In 1943, Reisman was one of the founders of Kibbutz Beit HaArava in the north of the Dead Sea. After the kibbutz was evacuated during the 1948 Arab–Israeli War, Reisman and his colleagues founded Kibbutz Kabri in the Western Galilee.

He is the father of the painter Osnat Ben Shalom.

== Art career ==
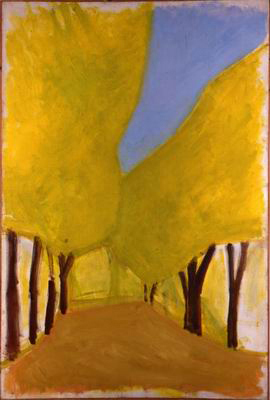
Boulevard of Carob trees, 1960s

In the early 1950s, Reisman spent two years in Paris studying at the École Nationale des Beaux-Arts and attending painter Jean Souverbie's Monumental Art workshop.

Israeli artists Lea Nikel, Eliahu Gat, and Michael Gross were also in Paris at the time, and Reisman formed long-lasting friendships with them.

Upon his return to the kibbutz, Reisman opened a studio in an abandoned building, where he worked on his art several times a week. He painted landscapes, portraits and still-life in bright colors. He began to exhibit his work in solo and group exhibitions. He spent more time in Paris in the 1970s. In 1974 he joined the "Aklim" (Climate) Group.

== Awards and recognition ==
- 1953 Prize "Concours le Franc" Ecole National de Beaux Arts, Paris
- 1988 The Israel Discount Bank Prize for an Israeli Artist, Israel Museum, Jerusalem
- 1989 Gutman Histadrut Prize for Painting and Sculpture

== See also ==
- Visual arts in Israel
- Art
- Israel
