= Ory (surname) =

Ory is a surname, and may refer to:

- Birgitt Ory (born 1964), German diplomat
- Carlos Edmundo de Ory (1923–2010), born in the Spanish city of Cadiz, Spanish avant-garde poet
- Csaba Őry (born 1952), Hungarian politician and Member of the European Parliament with the Hungarian Civic Party
- Gisèle Ory (born 1956), Swiss politician from the Canton of Neuchâtel
- Kid Ory (1886–1973), Edward "Kid" Ory - American jazz trombonist and bandleader
- Matthieu Ory (born 1492), French Dominican theologian and Inquisitor
- Meghan Ory (born 1982), Canadian television and film actress
- Michel Ory (born 1966), Swiss amateur astronomer
- Pascal Ory (born 1948), French historian
- Teresa Hurtado de Ory (born 1983), Spanish actress

== See also ==
- Ory (disambiguation)
- Fritz d'Orey, Brazilian race car driver
- Marcello d'Orey, Portuguese rugby union player and lawyer
