= Tel Yosef =

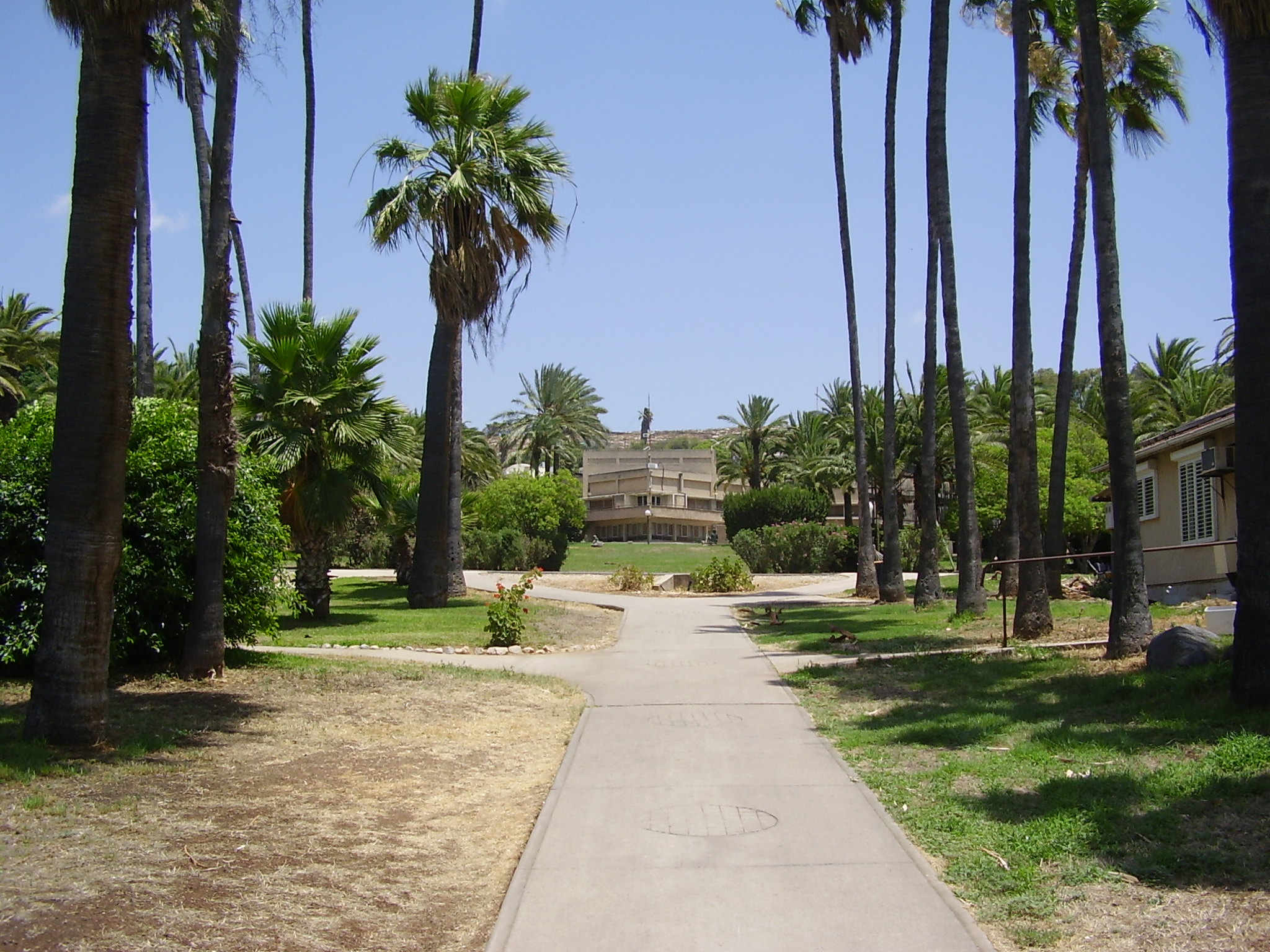
- Etymology: Yosef Mound
- Location within Jezreel Valley region of Israel Location within Israel
- Coordinates: 32°33′23″N 35°24′4″E
- Country: Israel
- District: Northern
- Subdistrict: Jezreel
- Council: Gilboa Regional Council
- Affiliation: Kibbutz Movement
- Founded: 1921
- Founder: Gdud HaAvoda members
- Population (2024): 547

Tel Yosef (Hebrew: תֵּל יוֹסֵף, lit. 'Yosef Mound') is a kibbutz in north-eastern Israel. Located in the Jezreel Valley, it falls under the jurisdiction of Gilboa Regional Council. In 2024 it had a population of 547.

== History ==
In 1921, members of the Gdud HaAvoda "Work Battalion", at a time when their road work was decreasing, set up a work camp in the Harod Valley, the eastern extension of the Jezreel Valley, at the foot of Mount Gilboa. The kibbutz was established on Sheikh Hassan hill in the same year the work battalion members, and was named after Joseph Trumpeldor. Members worked at draining the swamps, a permanent source of malaria. The Tel Yosef-Ein Harod group split in July 1923 over differences concerning economic autonomy, with two-thirds of the group settling Tel Yosef and the rest, Ein Harod. While it's sometimes considered that Ein Harod was founded in 1921 and Tel Yosef in 1923, the fact remains that together they formed one farming unit. In 1926, during a breakup of the Gdud HaAvoda along ideological faultlines separating the Marxists from the more moderate leftists, Ein Harod and Tel Yosef ceased their close cooperation.

According to a census conducted in 1922 by the British Mandate authorities, Tel Yosef had a population of 112 Jews. The community was targeted during the 1929 Palestine Riots in August of that year, and destroyed by fire.

At the time of the 1931 census, Tel Yosef had 72 occupied houses and a population of 261, all Jews. At its height, the kibbutz had 600 members. In the early 1950s, an ideological dispute headed by Yitzhak Tabenkin led to a split in which 250 members joined the neighboring kibbutz, Beit HaShita. Supporters of David Ben-Gurion remained at Tel Yosef.

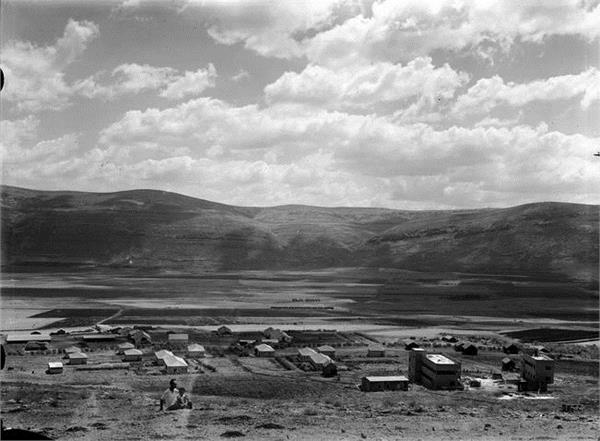
Tel Yosef 1930

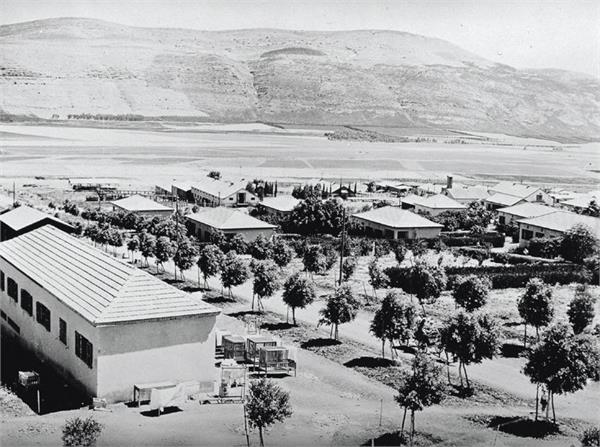
Tel Yosef 1930

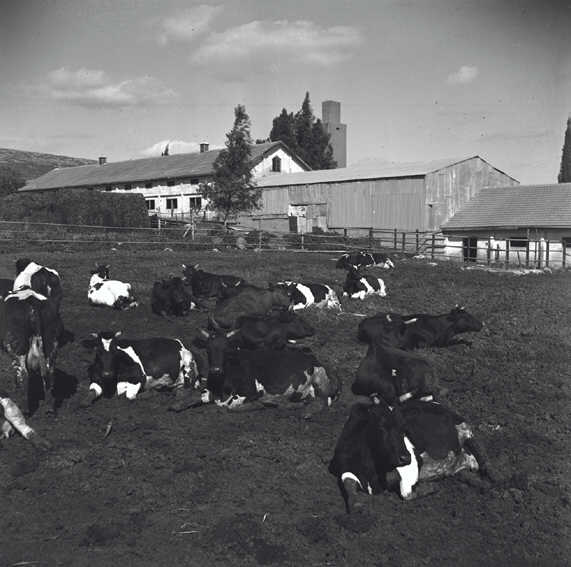
Tel Yosef 1945

== Economy ==
The first citrus crop was planted in 1931. In 1936, Tnuva opened its first dairy at Tel Yosef, specializing in hard cheeses. In 1942, the kibbutz built the country's first commercial fishponds.

== Notable people ==
- Ori Reisman
