= King Orry =

King Orry may refer to:

== People ==
- Godred Crovan (died 1095), eleventh-century Norse-Gaelic ruler of Dublin and the Isles

== Ships ==
Several ships operated by the Isle of Man Steam Packet Company:

- PS King Orry (1842), a wooden paddle steamer built in Douglas 1842; sold to Robert Napier & Co. of Glasgow; disposed of in 1858
- PS King Orry (1871), an iron paddle steamer; broken up at Llanerchymor, Wales, in 1912
- SS King Orry (1913), a packet steamer that served until she was sunk during the Evacuation of Dunkirk in 1940
- SS King Orry (1946), the lead ship of the King Orry class of passenger ferries and packet ships, more commonly referred to as the six sisters
- MV King Orry (1972), a multi-purpose ferry renamed King Orry in 1995

== See also ==
- Manx National Anthem National Anthem of the Isle of Man (verse 2)
- King Orrin
