= Orit Zamir =

- אורית זמיר
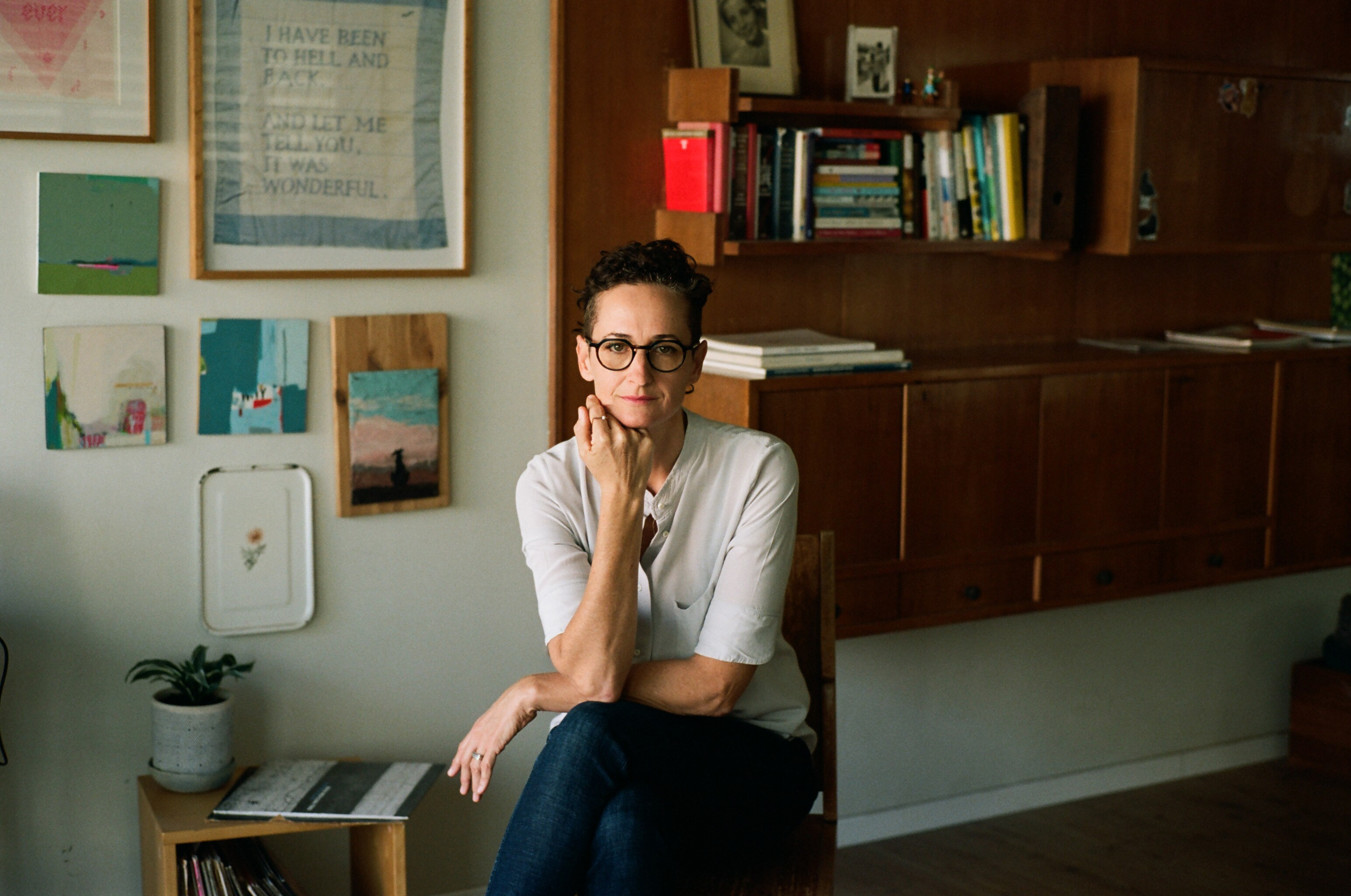
- Born: 26 July 1972 (age 53); Tel Aviv, Israel
- Occupations: Screenwriter; producer; director

Orit Zamir (Hebrew: אורית זמיר; born July 26, 1972) is an Israeli filmmaker, active as a screenwriter, producer, and educator as well as the former director of the Sam Spiegel Film and Television School International Film Lab and co-founder and director of the Series Lab.

Zamir co-created and co-wrote the series The Truth with Daphna Levine which sold to multiple territories including AMC, Canal+, BeTV. She produced Ruthy Pribar’s Asia, which was Israel’s entry into the 2020 Academy Awards for best foreign film, and won 9 Israeli Academy Awards, including Best Film.

== Biography ==
Born and raised in Tel Aviv, Aurit spent a number of years in the US with her family. Upon returning to Israel she completed high school in Tel Aviv with a concentration on film, photography and literature.

Aurit served in the IDF air force and moved to New York City after her army service. She studied creative writing at NY and continued her studies when she returned to Israel, first at Camera Obscura and later at Tel Aviv University where she studied English literature.

She went on to study film at the Jerusalem Sam Spiegel Film and Television School and graduated with honors in 2001. During her studies she also won the Department of Education Prize as well as the Mayoral First Prize.

Her graduation film 800 Calories won Israeli and international prizes and was broadcast on Israeli television.

== Career ==
After graduation, Aurit began working in the Israeli film industry. She served as first assistant director on a number of feature films including Miss Entebbe, Broken Wings, Ricky, Ricky, Noodle, The Long Journey and In Treatment.

Her production experience began in workshops such as Producers Network in Cannes and Rotterdam as well as in EAVE.

In 2008 she established Gum Films along with her partner Yoav Roeh. Together they have produced the feature films Delegation, The Future, Asia, The Testament, Manpower, Off White Lies, and the narrative series Tell Me Everything, For God's Sake and The Missing File and was a producing partner on The Accursed.

In addition she produced the documentaries The Governor, Two Kids A Day, As Themselves, The Lab, Night Shift, Long Distance. and the documentary series One Last Bedtime Story and Tangled Roots.

Films she produced have screened at leading international film festivals including Tribeca, Berlin and Venice.

Her 2016 short Babysitter, which she wrote and directed, won first place at the Haifa International Film Festival and the directing prize at Flickers Film Festival.

Her Hebrew prose has been published in literary magazines such as Granta (2017) and Petel (2019).

A longtime teacher and mentor at her alma mater, Zamir headed the Entrepreneurial Producing Department at the Jerusalem Sam Spiegel Film andTelevision School till 2021.

She has served as a lector and jury member for the Israel Film Fund, the Jerusalem International Film Lab, the Haifa International Film Festival, The Tel Aviv Student Film Festival, The Jerusalem Women's Film Festival, as well as jury member at DocAviv.

In January 2020 she was appointed the director of the Sam Spiegel International Film Lab and co founded and directed the Sam Spiegel Series Lab, both till 2022.

Aurit co-created and wrote the Police Drama "The Truth" with Dafna Levine. The show was broadcast on Israeli Public Broadcaster Kan 11 and sold to multiple territories including AMC, Canal+, BeTV.

== Filmography ==
Year	Title	Position	Genre
2024	The Truth	Co-Creator, Co-Writer, 2nd Unit Director	Drama Series
2024	Tell Me Everything	Producer	Drama Series
2024	The Governor	Producer	Documentary Film
2023	Delegation	Producer	Narrative Feature Film
2023	The Future	Producer	Narrative Feature Film
2022	Two Kids A Day	Producer	Documentary Film
2020	Asia	Producer	Fiction
2020	Tangled Roots	Producer	TV series
2019	The Missing File	Producer	TV series
2019	The Rabbi from Hezbollah	Producer	Documentary
2017	The Testament	Producer	Fiction
2017	One Last Bedtime Story	Producer	TV series
2017	As Themselves	Producer	Documentary
2016	Babysitter	Director, screenwriter & Producer	Short Fiction
2015	Third Person	Producer	Documentary
2014	Manpower	Producer	Fiction
2014	The Accursed	Producer	TV series
2013	Night Shift	Producer	Documentary
2011	Off White Lies	Producer	Fiction
2010	Mama	Producer	Documentary
2009	Long Distance	Producer	Documentary
