= Ori =

Ori or ORI may refer to:

== People ==
- Ori (given name), a Hebrew given name, and a list of people with the name
- Ōri Umesaka (1900–1965), Japanese photographer
- Amos Ori (born 1956), Israeli physicist and professor
- Györgyi Őri (born 1955), Hungarian former handball player
- Israel Ori (1658–1711), figure of the Armenian national liberation movement and diplomat
- Valvil Ori, a king in what is now Tamil Nadu, India around 200 AD

== Fictional or mythical characters ==
- Ori, in the List of dwarfs in Norse mythology
- Ori (Middle-earth), a dwarf in J. R. R. Tolkien's legendarium of Middle-earth
- Ori (Stargate), fictional evil beings in the Stargate SG-1 television series
- Ori, the titular protagonist of the Ori and the Blind Forest and Ori and the Will of the Wisps video games

== Organizations ==
- United States Office of Research Integrity, a government body
- Old Republic International, a property insurance and title and deed Fortune 500 company based in Chicago
- Oregon Research Institute, a psychology research institute in Eugene, Oregon
- Oriental Research Institute & Manuscripts Library, University of Kerala, India

== Places ==
- Port Lions Airport (IATA and FAA codes), Alaska, US
- Pic d'Orhy, aka Ori, a mountain in the Pyrenees, France and Spain
- Ori Station, a Seoul Metropolitan Subway station, South Korea

== Science and technology ==
- Orion (constellation) (standard astronomical abbreviation)
- Origin of replication, in cellular biology
- ori, OR Immediate, an RISC-V instruction

== Other uses ==
- Orientation (sign language)
- Obsessive relational intrusion, in psychology
- Ori (Yoruba), a metaphysical concept important to Yoruba spirituality and Orisha worship
- The Oriental Hotel or The Ori, a pub in Australia
- Odia language (ISO 639-3 code: ori), of India
