= Orit Rozin =

Israeli historian

Orit Rozin (Hebrew: אורית רוזין) is an Israeli historian. She is a professor of Jewish history at the University of Tel Aviv.

Donna Robinson Divine, writing in The New Rambler in 2016, described Rozin as "one of a new generation of scholars building their careers around an exploration of Israel's social, cultural and political history."

== Books ==
- Duty and Love: Individualism and Collectivism in 1950s Israel (Chaim Weizmann Institute for the Study of the History of Zionism and Israel at Tel Aviv University/Am Oved, 2008)
- The Rise of the Individual in 1950s Israel: A Challenge to Collectivism (Brandeis University/University Press of New England, 2011)
- A Home for All Jews: Citizenship, Rights and National Identity in the Young Israeli State (Brandeis University/University Press of New England, 2016)
