= SS Mona's Queen (1946) =

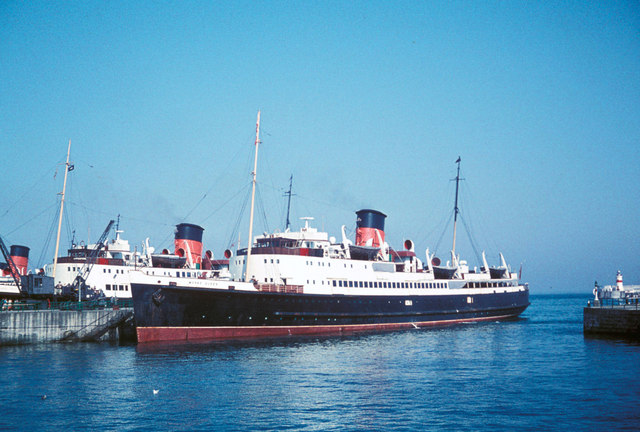
- Mona's Queen on 31 August 1961 at Douglas

History

Isle of Man
- Name: 1946: Mona's Queen; 1962: Barrow Queen; Carissima; Carina; 1964: Fiesta
- Owner: 1946–1962: IOMSPCo; 1962–1981: Chandris Line
- Operator: 1946–1962: IOMSPCo; 1962–1981: Chandris Line
- Port of registry: Douglas, Isle of Man
- Route: 1946–1962: Isle of Man; 1963–mid '70s: Mediterranean cruises
- Builder: Cammell Laird
- Cost: £411,241
- Yard number: 1170
- Launched: 5 February 1946
- Maiden voyage: 26 June 1946
- In service: 1946
- Out of service: 1962
- Identification: IMO number: 5415224; Code Letters G M J R
- Fate: Sold for scrap, September, 1981

General characteristics
- Class & type: King Orry-class Passenger Ship
- Type: Passenger Steamer (converted to small cruise ship).
- Tonnage: 3,659 GRT
- Length: 325 feet (99 m)
- Beam: 47 feet (14 m)
- Draught: 18 feet (5.5 m)
- Decks: 5 passenger decks
- Installed power: Steam Turbine 8,500 i.h.p.
- Propulsion: Twin-screw
- Speed: 21 knots
- Capacity: 2163 as Mona's Queen; 340 as Fiesta
- Crew: 68

TSS (RMS) Mona's Queen (IV) was a passenger vessel operated by the Isle of Man Steam Packet Company from 1946 to 1962. Sold to the Chandris group in 1962, she was adapted for cruising and operated as Carina and, from 1964 Fiesta until scrapped in Greece in 1981.

== History ==
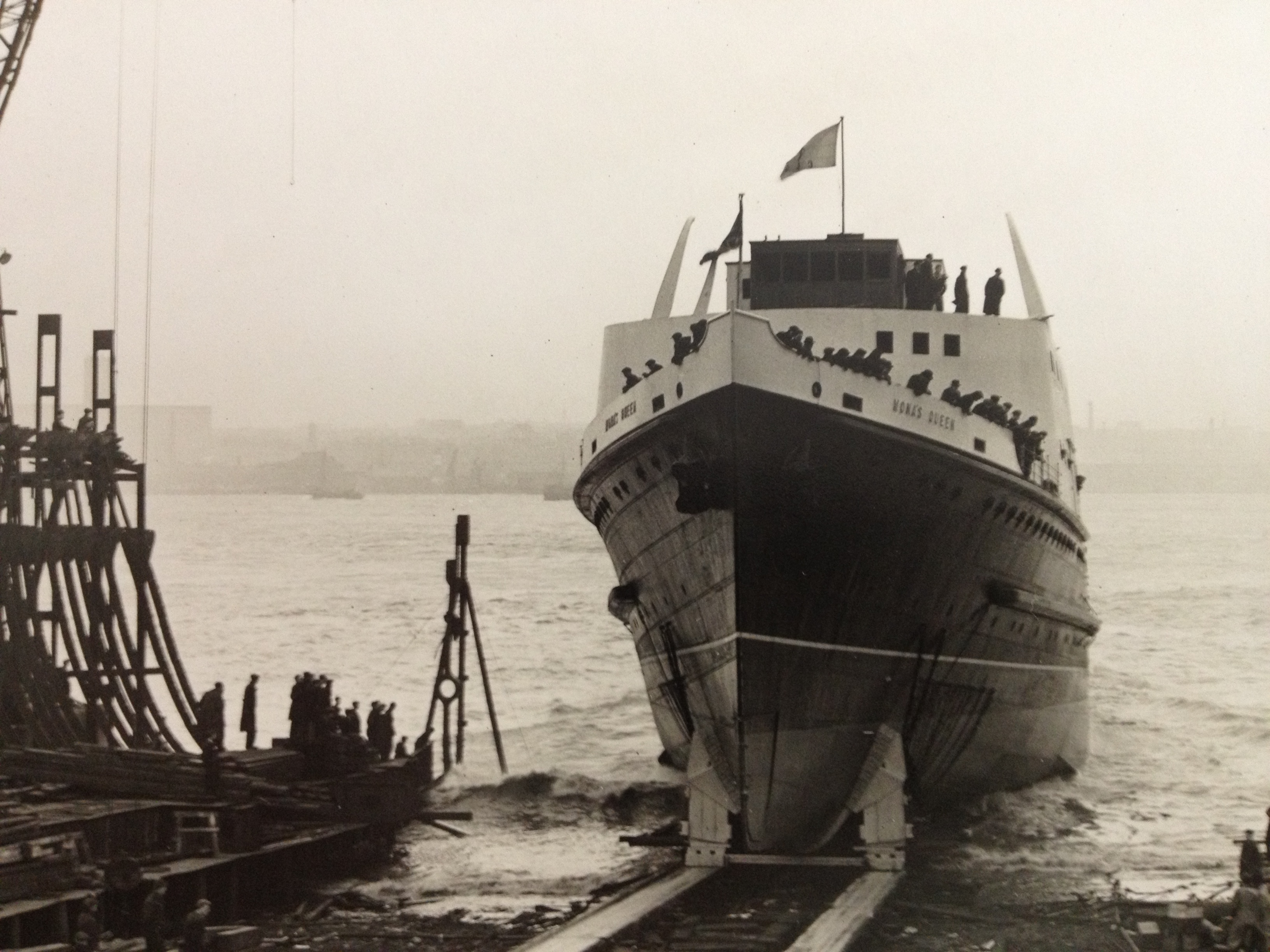
Mona's Queen is launched at Birkenhead

Mona's Queen was built by Cammell Laird at Birkenhead at a cost of £411,241. She was the second of six vessels - the six sisters - ordered by the Company between 1946 and 1955. She was the fourth vessel to be named as such in the Company's history. Her maiden voyage was on 26 June 1946 from Douglas to Liverpool.

== Dimensions ==
Mona's Queen was virtually identical to her older sister, King Orry. The only difference was that the main mast crosstrees on Mona's Queen were higher than those on King Orry.

During a major refit in 1954 she was fitted with radar.

She had an original tonnage of 2,485 GRT; length 325'; beam 47'; depth 18'; speed 21 knots; i.h.p. 8,500.

During refit in 1964, her tonnage was increased to 3,158, a swimming pool was installed together with accommodation for 340 passengers.

== Service life ==
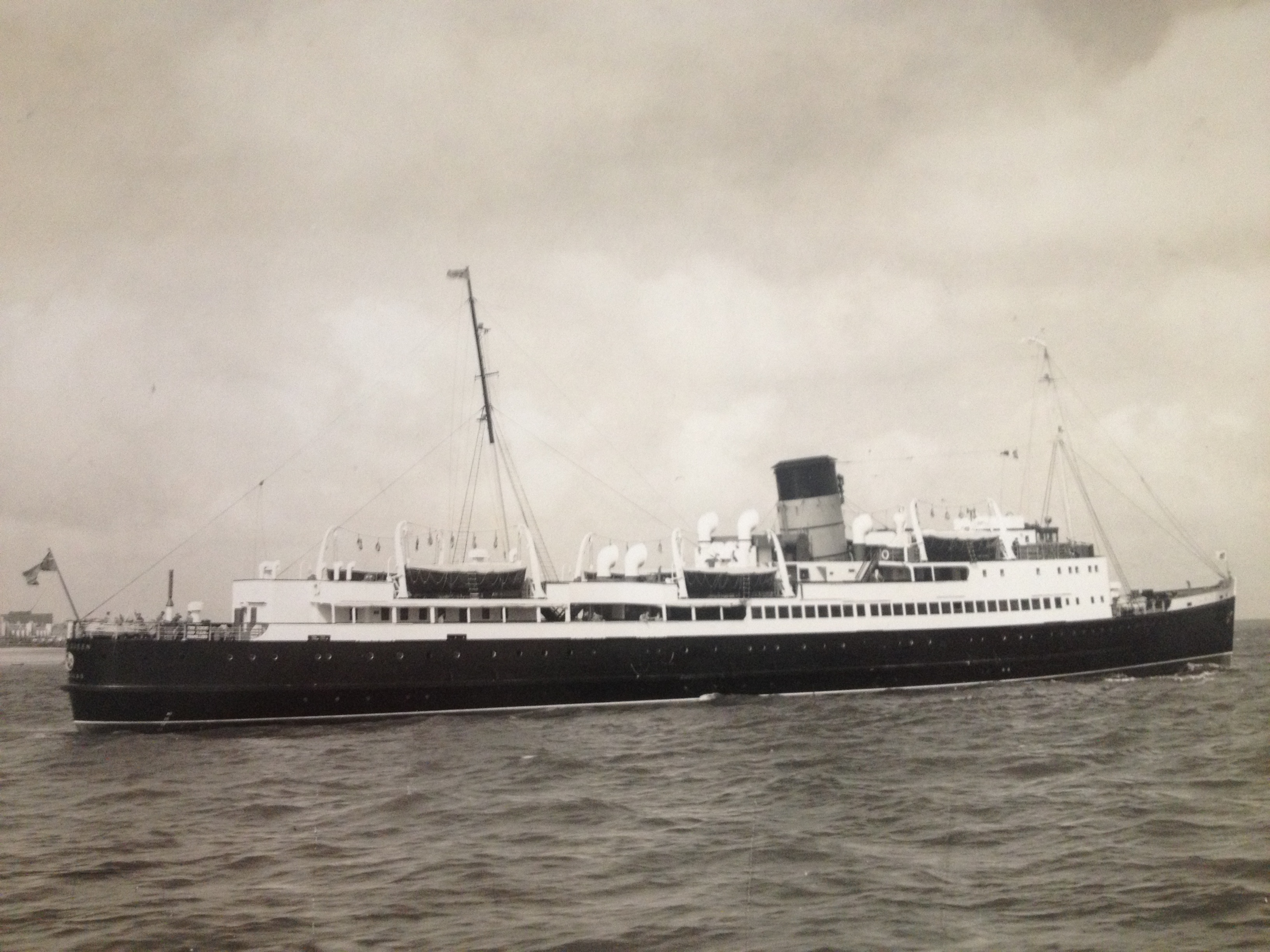
Mona's Queen in Steam Packet service.

Mona's Queen mainly operated between Liverpool or Fleetwood to Douglas, giving reliable service for 16 years until her register was closed on 22 October 1962. Her end came quickly as the Fleetwood berth was declared unsafe and no reconstruction was in sight. Mona's Queen made the company's final sailing from Fleetwood on 11 September 1961 with 1193 passengers on board.

With the introduction of the Company's new car ferry Manx Maid scheduled for 1962, coupled with the closing of the Port of Fleetwood, the decision was taken by the Steam Packet Board to dispose of one of the passenger steamers. Whilst the slightly older King Orry may have been the obvious vessel to be disposed of, she had been fitted out for winter service, and so the decision was taken that the Mona's Queen would be put up for sale as a consequence, reducing the number of passenger steamers from 8 to 7.

Made redundant, she was laid up at Barrow-in-Furness until sold in October 1962 to the Chandris group of companies leaving Barrow on 14 November, to start a new life as a cruise ship with the Chandris Line. After purchase, she was renamed four times. For the voyage to Greece she was renamed the Barrow Queen, then in turn Carissima, Carina and finally, Fiesta.

She was adapted for cruising and operated as Carina in 1963, carrying 220 passengers and 60 cars. Also during 1963, Carina operated the 19-hour route between Piraeus and Brindisi through the Corinth Canal.

She was rebuilt again at the end of the 1964 season as a full cruise ship, emerging as Fiesta carrying 378 passengers. As part of her 1964 programme, Fiesta cruised from Nice to Bastia, Palermo, Tunis, Palma, Majorca and Port-Vendres.

Following rebuild, in 1965 and subsequent years Fiesta operated 14-day Mediterranean cruises from Venice.

Fiesta and five other early Chandris ships were offered for sale in January 1972 while laid up at Eleusis Bay (Piraeus). She was scrapped in Perama in September 1981.

== Incidents ==
In March 1952, Mona's Queen collided with Battery Pier at Douglas Harbour. In August 1959, she collided with Prince's Landing Stage at Liverpool, starting her winter lay up early.
