= SS King Orry (1946) =

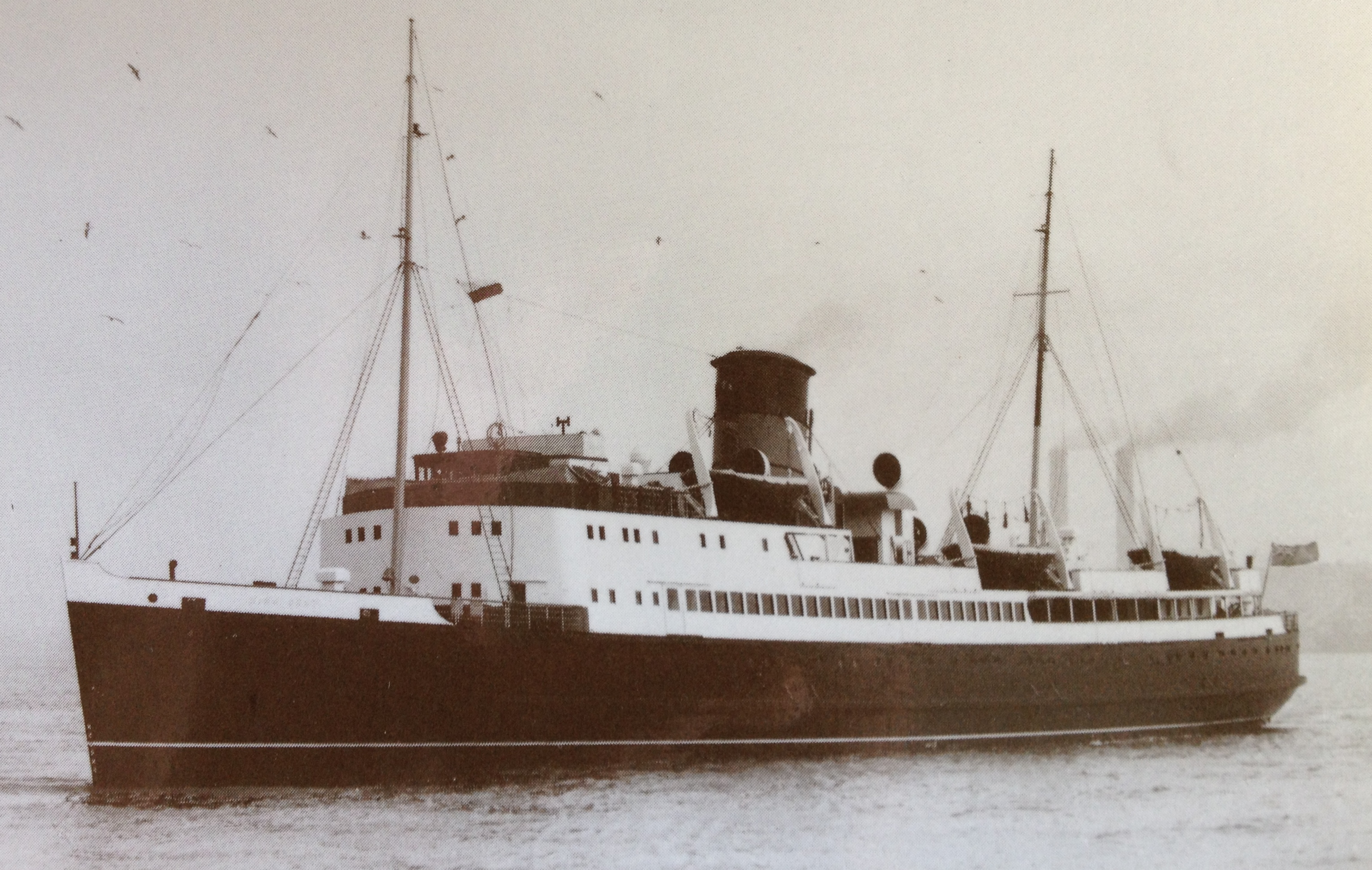
- RMS King Orry

History
- Name: King Orry
- Namesake: King Gorree / Ree Gorree / Grodred Crovan
- Owner: Isle of Man Steam Packet
- Port of registry: Douglas, Isle of Man
- Route: Douglas to Liverpool
- Ordered: 1945
- Builder: Cammell Laird & Co Ltd
- Cost: £402,095
- Yard number: 165282
- Launched: 22 November 1945
- Acquired: 16 April 1946
- Maiden voyage: 18 January 1946
- Out of service: 31 August 1975
- Identification: IMO number: 5187607; Callsign: GMJM; Code Letters GMJM
- Fate: Broken-up 1979

General characteristics
- Tonnage: 2,485 gross register tons (GRT)
- Length: 344 ft 0 in (104.9 m)
- Beam: 47 ft 0 in (14.3 m)
- Draught: 18 ft 0 in (5.5 m)
- Installed power: 1,008nhp, 8,500ihp 4 steam turbines, single reduction gearing.
- Speed: 21.5 knots (40 km/h); maximum
- Capacity: 2,136 passengers
- Crew: 68

TSS (RMS) King Orry (IV) - the fourth vessel in the line's history to be so named - was the lead ship of the King Orry Class of passenger ferries and packet ships. More commonly referred to as the six sisters, they were built for the Isle of Man Steam Packet Company between 1946 & 1955 primarily to replace war-time losses. The company's previous King Orry was one of three company losses during Operation Dynamo - the evacuation of British and French troops from the port of Dunkirk during May 1940.

The name King Orry is a corruption of King Gorree, from the Manx Gaelic Ree Gorree, the Manx name for Godred Crovan a Norse-Gael ruler of Dublin, and King of Mann and the Isles in the second half of the 11th century.

== Construction & dimensions ==
King Orry was built at Cammell Laird, Birkenhead. The cost of the vessel was £402,095. Length 325 feet; beam 47 feet; depth 18 feet( see note), with a registered tonnage of 2,485 GRT. King Orry was driven by two sets of Parsons turbines with single reduction gearing producing 8,500 brake horsepower. This gave the vessel a design speed of 21 knots. King Orry was certificated to carry 2136 passengers, and had a crew complement of 68.

She had a single funnel, a cruiser stern and two pole masts.

King Orry was launched on 22 November 1945, and acquired by Isle of Man Steam Packet Company on 16 April 1946. She made her maiden voyage on 19 April, and completed 29 years service.

Note: the information on All the Six Sisters lists draught As 18 feet. This is actually the depth (the distance from main deck to keel) the draught was around 12/13 feet i.e. the depth of water required to float. This can be clearly seen on bow and stern as the draught in feet is marked in white numbers. The white line separating the red painted lower hull from the black painted portion has the number 16 on it at the bow and 14 at the stern. The actual waterline, even loaded, is a few feet lower.

== Service life ==
The King Orry-class of six ships were the culmination of war-time experience and pre-war service by Isle of Man Steam Packet Company.

Essentially, the class were a modified design of the 1936 "Twins" - Fenella and Tynwald.

King Orry was the first company vessel to adopt the system of prior booking for private cabins, which was considered to be a splendid innovation. Due to a rationalisation of company routes following problems with the berth at Fleetwood, her younger sister Mona's Queen was disposed of in 1962.

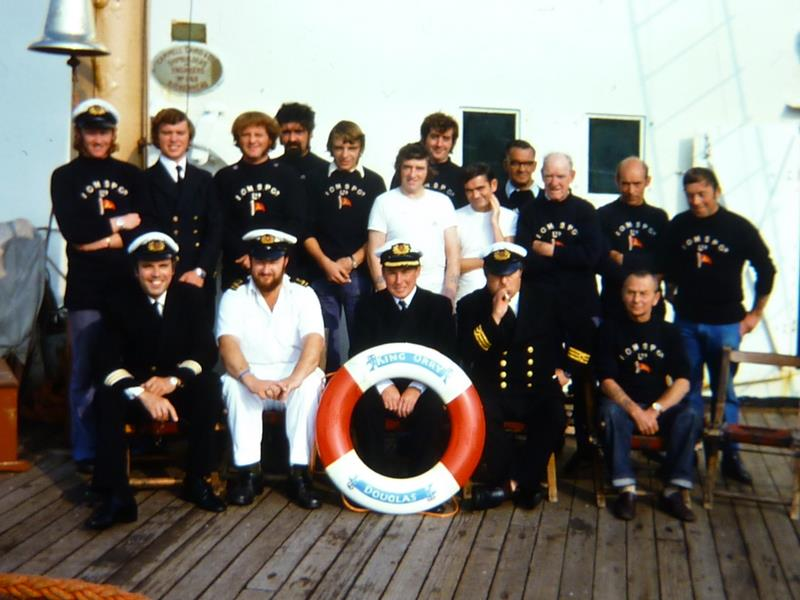
King Orry Officers, Deck Crew, Engineering Staff and Catering Staff, circa 1973.

King Orry was considered a reliable and efficient ship, her most noteworthy episode during her service occurred in 1953, when a great storm sank the Princess Victoria in the North Channel. While that tragedy was in progress, King Orry was one of the few ships at sea and although late, reached Douglas safely under the command of Captain Bridson.

With the introduction into service of the company's third car ferry, Mona's Queen in 1972, time was beginning to catch up with the King Orry.

King Orry made her final crossing from Douglas on Saturday, 30 August 1975; to the traditional farwell from her sister's ship's whistles, at 15:00hrs.

On Bank Holiday Monday, 31 August 1975, King Orry carried her last passengers from Llandudno to Liverpool.

== Disposal ==
King Orry was bought by R. Taylor and Son of Bury for breaking up, and was taken to Glasson Dock to await her fate. She was berthed alongside for more than two months and there were rumours that she might be resold to Greek interests.

However, during a severe storm on the night of Friday, 2 January 1976, whilst laid-up at Glasson Dock on the lower estuary, King Orry broke away from her berth and drifted aground in the Lune Estuary, coming to rest on the mud flats. A great deal of energy was spent trying to re-float her, until she was finally re-floated on 15 April 1976.

Lynch and Son of Rochester, Kent broke her up in 1979.

King Orry's name was destined to survive. The breakers were approached by officials from the National Maritime Museum who purchased her starboard turbines, auxiliary machinery, a propeller and one of her three boilers. These were regarded as typical of the machinery used in the 1940s on cross-channel ships. On purchase the items were put into storage at Chatham Dockyard, the intention being to put them on display later at Greenwich. Subsequently, this occurred, and further information regarding her machinery arrangement and specifications were supplied by the Isle of Man Steam Packet Company.
