= Schwartz (surname) =

Schwartz is a last name of German origin, meaning "black" (modern spelling in German is schwarz [ˈʃvaʁts]). It was originally a nickname for someone with black hair or a dark complexion. Notable people and characters with the surname include:

- Aaron Schwartz (disambiguation)
- Abe Schwartz (1881–1963), American Jewish musician
- Adi Schwartz, Israeli journalist and academic
- Adrian Schwartz, Israeli former backgammon champion and convicted serial rapist
- Al Schwartz (disambiguation), multiple people
- Alba Schwartz (1857–1942), Danish writer
- Albert Schwartz (disambiguation)
- Alice Schwartz (1925 or 1926–2025), American businesswoman
- Allyson Schwartz (born 1948), American politician
- Alois Schwartz (born 1967), German football manager and former player
- Aloysius Schwartz (1930–1992), American Catholic priest
- Alvin Schwartz (disambiguation)
- Amy Schwartz (disambiguation), multiple people
- Anat Schwartz, Israeli filmmaker, television director, data analyst and freelance writer
- Andrea Schwartz (born 1977), Canadian swimmer
- Andrei Schwartz (born 1989), Romanian footballer
- Andrew Thomas Schwartz (1867–1942), American painter
- Andy Schwartz (born 1950), American politician
- Anna Schwartz (1915–2012), American Jewish economist
- Annetta Schwartz, Romanian Jewish musician
- Anton Schwartz (born 1967), American jazz musician
- Anton Maria Schwartz (1852–1929), Austrian Roman Catholic priest
- Ari Schwartz, American cybersecurity and technology policy expert
- Arnold Schwartz (1901–1975), Danish rower
- Arthur Schwartz (1900–1984), American Jewish composer and film producer
- Athalia Schwartz (1821–1871), Danish writer, journalist and educator
- Avi Schwartz, Israeli painter
- Azi Schwartz (born 1981), Israeli–American Jewish chazzan, vocal performer and recording artist
- Barbara Schwartz (disambiguation)
- Barry Schwartz (disambiguation)
- Béla Schwartz (1891–?), Hungarian Jewish leader
- Benjamin Schwartz (disambiguation)
- Bernard Schwartz (disambiguation)
- Berthold Schwartz or Swartz, legendary German alchemist of the 14th century, sometimes credited with the invention of gunpowder
- Beth Schwartz, American television writer
- Bill Schwartz (disambiguation), several people
- Bonnie Schwartz, experimental linguist
- Bryan Schwartz (born 1971), American football player
- Buky Schwartz (1932–2009), Israeli sculptor
- Candy Schwartz, educator, author and librarian
- Carl Schwartz (1817–1870), Hebrew Christian clergyman and minister of the Free Church of Scotland
- Carol Schwartz (born 1944), American politician and perennial candidate
- Carol Schwartz (businesswoman), Australian business executive, community leader and philanthropist
- Catherine Schwartz (born 1977), American television personality
- Chandra Lee Schwartz (born 1981), American theatre performer
- Charles Schwartz (disambiguation)
- Christian Schwartz (born 1977), American type designer
- Dana Schwartz (born 1993), American journalist, screenwriter and author
- Daniel Schwartz (disambiguation)
- Darren Schwartz (born 1968), Canadian ice hockey player
- David Schwartz (disambiguation), several people
- Delmore Schwartz (1913–1966), American Jewish poet and short-story writer
- Dominique Schwartz, Australian journalist
- Douglas Schwartz, American television screenwriter and series creator
- Douglas W. Schwartz (1929–2016), American archaeologist
- Dov Schwartz (born 1961), Israeli professor
- D'Shawn Schwartz (born 1999), American basketball player
- Ebbe Schwartz (1901–1964), Danish football administrator
- Ed Schwartz (disambiguation)
- Einar Schwartz-Nielsen (1883–1939), Danish fencer
- Elaine Schwartz (born 1943), American politician
- Elek Schwartz (1908–2000), Romanian professional footballer and coach
- Eli Schwartz, Israeli physician
- Elias Schwartz (died 2016), American synagogue rabbi, yeshiva principal and author
- Elizabeth Schwartz, American vocalist
- Elizabeth F. Schwartz (born 1971), American attorney, author and advocate
- Elliott Schwartz (1936–2016), American composer
- Elmer Schwartz (1906–1949), American football player
- Elroy Schwartz (1923–2013), American comedy and television writer
- Emmanuel Schwartz, Canadian actor and playwright
- Eric Schwartz (disambiguation)
- Erica Schwartz American deputy surgeon general
- Erica Schwartz (politician), American politician
- Evan Schwartz (disambiguation)
- Evgeny Schwartz (1896–1958), Soviet writer
- Eytan Schwartz, Israeli communications and public relations expert
- Ezra Schwartz (born 1974), American rabbi
- Felice Schwartz (1925–1996), American Jewish feminist writer
- Fernando Schwartz (born 1937), Spanish writer
- Frans Schwartz (1850–1917), Danish artist
- Frederick Schwarz (disambiguation)
- Gadi Schwartz (born 1983), American journalist
- Gail Schwartz, American politician
- Garfield Schwartz, founder and president the Garfield Schwartz & Co. Builders
- Gary Schwartz (disambiguation), several people
- Gedalia Dov Schwartz (1925–2020), American Orthodox rabbi, scholar, and posek
- George X. Schwartz (1915–2010), American politician
- Gerry Schwartz (born 1941), Canadian Jewish businessman
- Gil Schwartz (1951–2020), American business humorist and novelist
- Glenn Schwartz (disambiguation)
- Greg Schwartz, American politician
- Gregor Schwartz-Bostunitsch (1883–after 1945), Nazi propagandist
- Gustav Schwartz (1809–1890), Austrian paleontologist
- H. Andrew Schwartz (1968–2025), American journalist and chief communications officer
- Hanit Schwartz (born 1987), Israeli women's soccer goalkeeper
- Hank Schwartz (1927–2020), American businessman
- Hans Schwartz (1913–1991), German football player
- Harold Schwartz (1910–2003), American businessman and real estate developer
- Harry Schwartz (disambiguation), multiple people
- Harvey Schwartz, American businessman
- Herbert Schwartz (1895–1994), American college sports coach
- Hillel Schwartz (1923–2007), Egyptian Jewish politician
- Hillel Schwartz (historian) (born 1948), American Jewish cultural historian
- Howard Schwartz (born 1945), American Jewish folklorist
- Hudson Schwartz (born 2009) American racing driver
- Isaac Schwartz (1923–2009), Soviet composer
- Isaïe Schwartz (1876–1952), great rabbi of France
- Isadore Schwartz alias "The Ghetto Midget" (1900–1988), American Jewish world champion flyweight boxer
- Jack Schwartz (1930–2009), American mathematician and computer scientist
- Jacob Schwartz (disambiguation)
- Jaden Schwartz (born 1992), Canadian ice hockey player
- James Schwartz (disambiguation)
- Janet Mielke Schwartz, American behavioral scientist
- Jay Schwartz (born 1965), American composer
- Jean Schwartz (1878–1956), American Jewish songwriter
- Jeffrey Schwartz (disambiguation)
- Jeremy Schwartz, British business executive, author and speaker
- Jerome Schwartz, American television and film writer and producer
- Jerome T. Schwartz (born 1951), American politician
- Jillian Schwartz (born 1979), Israeli pole vaulter
- Joel Schwartz (born 1947), American epidemiologist
- Johan Schwartz (disambiguation)
- John Schwartz (disambiguation), several people
- Jon "Bermuda" Schwartz (born 1956), American musician
- Jonathan Schwartz (disambiguation), several people named Jon or Jonathan
- Jordan Schwartz (born 1965), American executive
- Joseph Schwartz (disambiguation), multiple people
- Josh Schwartz (born 1976), American writer & producer
- Judith S. Schwartz, American educator, curator, author, maker, and contemporary ceramicist
- Jules Schwartz (1927–2013), American computer scientist
- Julius Schwartz (1915–2004), American comic book editor and agent
- Justin Schwartz (born 1965), American nuclear engineer and chancellor
- Kalyn Schwartz (born 1989), American mixed martial artist
- Kenneth A. Schwartz, American architect, community designer, planner and educator
- Kevie W. Schwartz, American chemical engineer and entrepreneur
- Lacey Schwartz Delgado (born 1977), American filmmaker
- Laila Schwartz (born 1949), Israeli artist, curator, author and film director
- Laura Schwartz (born 1973), American professional speaker, author and television commentator
- Lauren Schwartz (born 1961), American actress
- Laurent Schwartz (1915–2002), French Jewish mathematician
- Leon Schwartz, Ukrainian musician
- Leonard Schwartz (disambiguation)
- Leslie Schwartz, American writer
- Lester O. Schwartz (1912–2006), American painter, sculptor and printmaker
- Lew Sayre Schwartz (1926–2011), American comic book artist, advertising creator and filmmaker
- Lia Schwartz (1941–2020), Argentine-American historian
- Lillian Schwartz (1927–2024), American artist
- Linda Spoonster Schwartz (born 1944), American nurse
- Lisa Schwartz (born 1983), American author, actress, and YouTube personalty
- Lisa Schwartz (physician) (1963–2018), American Professor of Medicine and Community and Family Medicine at The Dartmouth Institute for Health Policy and Clinical Practice
- Lloyd Schwartz (born 1941), American poet
- Lloyd J. Schwartz (born 1946), American television producer and writer
- Loïc Schwartz (born 1992), Belgian basketball player
- Lorraine Schwartz, American jewelry designer
- Louis Schwartz (1888–1966), American politician
- Louis B. Schwartz (1913–2003), American law professor at the University of Pennsylvania Law School
- Lucy Schwartz (born 1989), American singer and songwriter
- Luke Schwartz (born 1984), British poker player
- Lulu Schwartz (born 1948), American journalist, columnist and author
- Lynne Sharon Schwartz (born 1939), American prose and poetry writer
- Maite Schwartz (born 1979), American film and television actress
- Malene Schwartz (born 1936), Danish film actress
- Mandi Schwartz (1988–2011), Canadian ice hockey player
- Manfred Schwartz (1909–1970), Polish-born American artist
- Manuela Schwartz, German musicologist
- Marchmont Schwartz (1909–1991), American college football player and coach
- Margaretta Schwartz, Yiddish singer of the late 19th century
- Marian Schwartz, American translator
- Marie Schwartz (disambiguation)
- Marie-Hélène Schwartz (1913–2013), French mathematician, worked on characteristic numbers of spaces with singularities
- Mark Schwartz (disambiguation)
- Marlene Schwartz, American director
- Martha Schwartz (born 1950), American landscape architect and educator
- Martin Schwartz (disambiguation)
- Marvin John Schwartz (1928–1997), American film producer and publicist
- Matt Schwartz (born 1971), Israeli-British music producer
- Maureen Schwartz (died 2019), Brazilian tennis player
- Maurice Schwartz (1890–1960), American actor and director
- Maxime Schwartz (born 1940), French molecular biologist
- Melvin Schwartz (1932–2006), American physicist
- Michael Schwartz (disambiguation), several people, including those known as Mike Schwartz
- Milton Schwartz (disambiguation)
- Mitchell Schwartz (born 1989), American professional football player
- Morrie Schwartz (1916–1995), American academic and author, subject of the book Tuesdays with Morrie
- Morris Schwartz (1901–2004), American photographer
- Morry Schwartz (born 1948), Australian property developer and publisher
- Morton L. Schwartz (1883–1953), American banker and financier
- Murray Schwartz (disambiguation)
- Nancy Lou Schwartz (1939–1981), American economist and professor
- Neena Schwartz (1926–2018), American endocrinologist
- Noah Schwartz (born 1983), American poker player
- Norman Schwartz, American businessman
- Norton A. Schwartz (born 1951), Chief of Staff of the United States Air Force
- Olivier Schwartz, French pharmacist
- Otto William Schwartz (1715–1785), Russian-born fur trader and political figure
- Paul Schwartz (disambiguation)
- Pedro Schwartz (born 1935), Spanish economist
- Pepper Schwartz (born 1945), American sociologist and sexologist
- Peri Schwartz (1951–2021), American painter and printmaker
- Perry Schwartz (1915–2001), American football player
- Peter Schwartz (disambiguation), multiple people
- Philina Schwartz (born 2006), German sprinter
- Philipp Schwartz (1894–1977), Hungarian-born neuropathologist
- Priscilla Schwartz (born 1967), Sierra Leonean lawyer
- Ramon Schwartz Jr. (1925–2017), American politician
- Randal L. Schwartz (born 1961), American computer scientist and technology writer
- Randy Schwartz (born 1944), American baseball player
- Raymond Schwartz (1894–1973), French banker and Esperanto author
- Regina Schwartz, English literary critic and journalist
- Richard Schwartz (disambiguation), several people
- Robert Schwartz (disambiguation)
- Rocky Schwartz (born 1984), American football safety
- Ron Schwartz, Israeli bridge player
- Ronnie Schwartz (born 1989), Danish professional footballer
- Ros Schwartz, English literary translator
- Roslyn Schwartz (born 1951), Canadian children's author and animator
- Roy Schwartz Tichon, Israeli entrepreneur
- Ruth L. Schwartz, American poet, memoirist, personal growth author and teacher
- Samuel Schwartz (disambiguation)
- Sander Schwartz (born 1954), American television animation producer
- Sándor Schwartz (1909–1994), Romanian football player
- Scott Schwartz (born 1968), American child actor
- Scott L. Schwartz (1959–2024), American actor best known for "The Bruiser" in the Ocean's Eleven film series
- Selby Wynn Schwartz, American author
- Seth Schwartz, American historian
- Seth Schwartz (psychologist), American developmental psychologist
- Seymour I. Schwartz (1928–2020), American physician
- Shalom H. Schwartz, Israeli social psychologist, cross-cultural researcher
- Sheila Schwartz (1952–2008), American writer and creative writing professor
- Sherwood Schwartz (1916–2011), American television writer and producer
- Shirley E. Schwartz (1935–2016), American chemist and research scientist
- Shuki Schwartz (born 1954), Israeli basketball player
- Shuly Rubin Schwartz, American academic
- Sidney Schwartz (1929–2017), American tennis player
- Simon Schwartz (disambiguation)
- Sophie Schwartz, Swiss neuroscientist
- Stan Schwartz, Canadian former football executive and coach
- Stefan Schwartz (born 1963), English and Canadian film and television director, writer and actor
- Stephen Schwartz (disambiguation), several people
- Stuart Schwartz (born 1944), American television producer
- Stuart B. Schwartz (born 1940), American historian
- Susan Schwartz, American scientist
- Theodore H. Schwartz (born 1965), American medical scientist, academic physician and neurosurgeon
- Thomas Schwartz (disambiguation)
- Thornel Schwartz (1927–1977), American jazz guitarist
- Tony Schwartz (disambiguation), multiple people
- Wilbur Schwartz (1918–1990), American studio session clarinetist, alto saxophonist and flutist
- William Schwartz (disambiguation)
- Wynn Schwartz, American psychologist and psychoanalyst
- Ylon Schwartz, American chess master and poker player
- Yoel Schwartz (1939–2022), Israeli Haredi Jewish rabbi, Torah scholar and writer
