= Raymon Elozua =

American artist (born 1947)

Raymon Elozua (born 1947, Bad Cannstatt, West Germany) is an American sculptor known for work addressing themes of labor, industrial decline, and social critique. Artworks by the artist are held in various permanent collections including the Carnegie Museum of Art, Metropolitan Museum of Art, the Los Angeles County Museum of Art, and the Yale University Art Gallery. His career has been the subject of two retrospectives: Constructing Elozua: A Retrospective organized by the Mint Museum in 2003, and Raymon Elozua: Structure & Dissonance organized by the Everson Museum of Art in 2022.

== Early life and education ==
Raymon Elozua was born in 1947 in Bad Cannstatt, West Germany, on a U.S. Army base. He is the son of Giselle Baubonne, a French war bride from Arc-les-Gray, and Raymond E. Keeslar, a Cuban-American United States Army veteran of Spanish descent whose birth name was Lázaro Raimundo y Elozua del Castillo. After his father was reassigned back to the United States, Elozua grew up in South Chicago, where his father later worked as an administrator for U.S. Steel and was subsequently laid off during the 1959 recession. As a child, Elozua regularly visited the Art Institute of Chicago, the Field Museum of Natural History, and the Museum of Science and Industry with his family. As a young man, Elozua briefly worked in a steel mill himself.

After graduating from Mt. Carmel High School, Elozua enrolled at the University of Chicago in 1965, where he studied political science, studio art, and theater. Influential professors that he studied with include artist Virgil Burnett, Virginio Ferrari and Ruth Duckworth. Elozua left the university in 1968 before completing a degree, relocating briefly to Berkley, California during a period of political activism surrounding the Vietnam War. He moved to New York City in 1969, where he worked constructing theater props and sets at Juilliard Theater.

== Career ==
=== Artistic work ===
Elozua began working in ceramics in 1974 after visiting the American Craft Council fair at the Dutchess County Fairgrounds in Rhinebeck, New York. He purchased a kiln, potter’s wheel, and several hundred pounds of clay and began experimenting with pottery techniques. He soon became a production potter and participated in the Rhinebeck craft fair from 1975-1977 before turning to sculpture.

In 1976, Elozua built a gas kiln capable of firing 24-inch square slabs of clay and he began creating landscape compositions that used the kiln's dimensions as a structural parameter. Drawing on his childhood hobby of constructing "model railroads," in 1977, Elozua began producing photo-realistic 1/4 scale models of decaying industrial architecture. Elozua gained critical attention following his first solo exhibition, Souvenir, at OK Harris Gallery in 1979, where he presented highly detailed miniature table-top landscapes made from clay. The subjects of these artworks were industrial environments, including railroad trestles, mine shafts, bridges, water towers, all in a state of decay and abandonment. Writing about Elozua's work for the Soho Weekly News, art critic Ellen Lubell described his approach as exhibiting the “crazed attention to detail of a maniacal hobby-model builder.”

The landscapes also incorporated circular white porcelain domes that contrasted with the recognizable industrial structures. Reviewing Elozua's work for Arts Magazine, Catherine Lamagna wrote that the juxtaposition of “plainly identifiable buildings and the suggestive but non-specific domes” gave the sculptures a “metaphysical character.” In Art International, James Fitzsimmons described the structures as having “a ghost-town aura of lingering human presence,” while John Yau, writing in Art in America, characterized them as “inventories of decay and loss.” In her monograph on the history of American ceramics, art historian Elaine Levin situated Elozua among artists engaging in “Urban Realism;” she went on to state that his sculptures “document a fading American industrial heritage, a familiar sight in the South side of Chicago where Elozua was raised.”

In 1984, when writing for the The Village Voice, art critic and curator Lucy R. Lippard noted a shift toward more overtly political subject matter in Elozua's work. That year, he developed Honorable Discharge, a series of large ceramic reliefs depicting blue-collar World War II G.I.s who fought in battles that were near defeats: Anzio, Tarawa and Kassrine Pass. In 1988, Elozua presented Home Scrap: Post-Industrial Landscapes at Carlo Lamagna Gallery, combining photographs, workers' statements, scrap metal, and industrial debris in works addressing the decline of the American steel industry. Reviewing the series in Arts, Suzanne Ramljak wrote that the artist's work "addressed the plight of disemployed steelworkers and, by extension, the plight of our postindustrial economy.”

Elozua met the artist Micheline Gingras in 1981, and the two began an ongoing collaborative partnership. For their first joint project, Elozua constructed models of dilapidated drive-in movie screens, onto which Gingras painted imagery of cinematic couples. Following an artist residency at Watershed Center for the Ceramic Arts in Maine (1989), they next collaborated in 1992, on a series of nearly life-size works known as the "Demon and Sirens" series, shown at the Habatat Shaw Gallery, Detroit, Michigan. Examples from this collaboration would be featured at the American Craft Museum (now the Museum of Arts and Design) in Confrontational Clay, a group exhibition curated by Judith S. Schwartz which explored socially-critical ceramic art. The sculptures were constructed from welded rebar and wire armatures covered with terra-cotta clay.

During the 1990s, Elozua’s work became increasingly abstract as he started to incorporate steel into his sculptures and digital technologies into his making process. Writing in 1994 for American Ceramics, Peter von Ziegesar observed that the “postindustrial narratives” of Elozua’s earlier work “were no longer evident.” One computer-designed work from 2001 was later exhibited at the Metropolitan Museum of Art in Shapes from Out of Nowhere (2021), where New York Times critic Roberta Smith described his sculptures as appearing to “explode,” with ceramic shards suspended on constructions of wire rods.

In 2013, Elozua hired glass artist Lorin Silverman, then a technician at the Corning Museum of Glass. Silverman produced blown glass elements into steel armatures which Elozua then incorporated into his steel and ceramic sculptures. Writer Thyrza Nichols Goodeve observed that the introduction of glass into his assemblages introduced themes of "hope, play, and resilience" into his work.

His career has been the subject of two retrospectives: Constructing Elozua: A Retrospective organized by the Mint Museum in 2003; and Raymon Elozua: Structure & Dissonance organized by the Everson Museum of Art in 2022.

In 2005, Elozua relocated to Mountaindale, New York. There he and Micheline Gingras opened artist studios, an exhibition space, and founded the Mountaindale Biennial. From 2008 to 2016, Elozua created two digital database driven photography projects; Vanishing Catskills and Egggbasket-SCNY. Vanishing Catskills is a survey of abandoned bungalow colonies, resorts and swimming pools within a ten mile radius of Mountaindale. Eggbasket is a series of video interviews of individuals who owned or worked on egg farms which supplied New York City as well as a historical database of 200 chicken coop locations.

In 2024, Elozua began "The Last Sculpture" series, incorporating repro automobile fenders into large-scale sculptures made with welded steel, ceramic, and glass components.

=== Curatorial work ===
In 1979, Elozua began a professional association and friendship with New York real-estate developer, artist and collector, Allan Chasanoff. Together, they assembled a contemporary ceramic collection; Elozua served as curatorial consultant. The collection focused on contemporary ceramic art that expanded the conceptual and formal boundaries of the medium. Acquisitions included works by artists such as Kathy Butterly, Betty Woodman, Stephen De Staebler, and John Roloff. The Chasonoff collection grew to include more than 400 ceramic pieces. In 1995, the collection was donated to the Mint Museum of Craft + Design (now the Mint Museum of Art) in Charlotte, North Carolina.

Allan Chasanoff and Elozua also established a collection of different recorded versions of the song Amazing Grace. They donated the collection to the Library of Congress; the institution described it as "undoubtedly the largest such collection of a single musical work in the [library's] recorded sound collection." With 3,049 versions of "Amazing Grace" in the collection, Guinness World Records also recognized it as the "largest collection of versions of one song." The song collection plays on the online site: amazinggrace.us/public/radio.

== Public collections ==
Elozua's work is held in public collections including the Carnegie Museum of Art; Los Angeles County Museum of Art; Metropolitan Museum of Art; Mint Museum; Museum of Arts & Design; Museum of Fine Arts, Houston; and Yale University Art Gallery.
