= Gingras =

Gingras is a French Canadian form of the original French surname Gingreau. See also; "Jingraw". Notable people with the surname include:

- André Gingras (1966–2013), Canadian dancer and choreographer
- Gaston Gingras (born 1959), Canadian ice hockey defensemen
- Gustave Gingras (1918–1996), Canadian physician
- Maxime Gingras (ice hockey) (born 1978), Canadian ice hockey player
- Maxime Gingras (skier) (born 1984), Canadian freestyle skier
- Micheline Gingras (born 1947), Canadian-born American artist
- Mireille Gingras (born 1971), American-based Canadian neurobiologist and entrepreneur
- Pierre Gingras (born 1952), Canadian politician
- René Gingras (1938–2016), Canadian politician
- Tony Gingras (1876–1937), Canadian ice hockey right winger
- Zachary Gingras (born 2001), Paralympic Medalist
