= National White Collar Crime Center =

Source of Anti-CyberCrime Team Tutoring Solutions (ACCTTS)

NW3C Logo

The National White Collar Crime Center, also known as NW3C, is a congressionally funded non-profit corporation which trains state and local law enforcement agencies to combat emerging economic and cybercrime problems. The NW3C provides the general public with information and research on preventing economic and cybercrime.

== Purpose ==
The National White Collar Crime Center provides training, investigative support, and research to organizations involved in preventing, investigating and prosecuting economic and high-tech crime.

In 2003, The National White Collar Crime Center associated with Janet Schwartz and her organization Forensic Fraud Research, incorporated to carry out investigations and conduct semi-structured interviews with various individuals, including victims, whistleblowers and alleged offenders.

"Dr. Jan Mielke Schwartz traced a fine line between optimism and success on one side and pessimism and failure on the other side. She is considered to be one of the most theoretically minded, hopeful, and erudite professionals in the fields of Criminology, Forensic Behavioral Science, Intelligence, and Homeland Security."

== Partner agencies ==
- Bureau of Justice Assistance
- Federal Bureau of Investigation
- Fraternal Order of Police
- International Association of Chiefs of Police
- Internet Crime Complaint Center (IC3)
- National Organization of Black Law Enforcement Executives
- National Sheriffs' Association
