= Lisa Schwartz (physician) =

American physician (1963–2018)

- Born: Lisa Miriam Schwartz; New York City, U.S.
- Died: November 29, 2018
- Education: State University of New York; New York University; Geisel School of Medicine
- Scientific career
- Workplaces: Geisel School of Medicine
- Website: geiselmed.dartmouth.edu/koop/resources-2/in-memory-of-lisa-schwartz/

Lisa Miriam Schwartz (June 30, 1963 – November 29, 2018) was a professor of medicine and community and family medicine at The Dartmouth Institute for Health Policy and Clinical Practice. She was the co-director of the Center for Medicine and the Media, and ran courses for health journalists on how to report medical research. She created the Drug Facts Box to discuss the benefits and harms of prescription drugs and the National Cancer Institute Know Your Chances site to communicate cancer risks.

== Early life and education ==
Schwartz was born in The Bronx, New York. In 1985, she graduated from Binghamton University; and, that same year before graduation, she was elected to the Phi Beta Kappa. She earned her MD at the New York University in 1989. She studied medicine at the Geisel School of Medicine and graduated in 1996. She completed her residency at the Bellevue Hospital and was an internal medicine fellow at the Geisel School of Medicine.

== Research ==
Schwartz collaborated extensively with her husband, Steven Edward Woloshin. They worked to improve dialogue between physicians, the public and journalists, by improving transparency and understanding of medical evidence. They investigated the advertisements of prescription drugs in America. In 2006 Woloshin and Schwartz systematically evaluated media coverage of medical meetings in The Medical Journal of Australia. They considered 187 studies, finding that 34% did not mention the size of the study and 40% did not quantify the main result. The study emphasised that articles presented at scientific meetings are not ready for the general public. She published a monograph on health statistic communication with the Association for Psychological Science. She was made the director of the Center for Medicine in the Media in 2011. She investigated the advertisement of Alzheimer's disease drug donepezil, and demonstrated that the Food and Drug Administration permitted the advertisement without any evidence. With Woloshin, she identified ways to overcome the overuse of medication.

Schwartz studied how numeracy impacted a woman's ability to understand the benefit of cancer screening. She launched the Know Your Chances with the National Cancer Institute to communicate cancer risks. It used data from SEET (Surveillance, Epidemiology and End Results Program) and the National Center for Health Statistics and included interactive charts that revealed the chances of dying. They looked at whether women would accept more infrequent cervical smears. In 2013 she created Drugs Fact Box with the Food and Drug Administration, a toolbox which could be used to communicate the benefits and cons of using prescription drugs. The Drugs Fact Box was accompanied by a booklet that helped the public understand health statistics. It was included in Section 3507 of the Patient Protection and Affordable Care Act.

She led the National Institutes of Health Medicine in the Media workshop and taught over five hundred health journalists how to understand medical research. She co-authored Know Your Chances with Steven Edward Woloshin in 2009 and Overdiagnosed in 2011. She was awarded the McGovern Award from the American Medical Writers Association in 2017. She has written for The New York Times, The Boston Globe, The Washington Post, and the Los Angeles Times.

== Death ==
Schwartz died of cancer on November 29, 2018.

== See also ==
- Informulary — health research company she co-founded with her husband, Steven E. Woloshin
