= Samuel Schwarz =

Samuel Schwarz may refer to:

- Mommie Schwarz (1876–1942), Dutch Jewish painter and graphic artist
- Samuel Schwarz (speed skater) (born 1983), German speed skater
- Samuel Schwarz (politician) (1814–1868), Swiss politician
- Samuel Schwarz (historian) (1880–1954), Polish-Portuguese mining engineer and historian

== See also ==
- Samuel Schwartz (disambiguation)
