= Al Schwartz =

Al Schwartz may refer to:

- Al Schwartz (producer) (born 1932), American television producer
- Al Schwartz (writer) (1910–1988), American screenwriter, television producer, and director
- Alan Schwartz (born 1950/1951), American executive
- Albert Schwartz (swimmer) (1907–1986), American swimmer
- Albert Schwartz (1923–1992), American zoologist
- Allen G. Schwartz (1934–2003), American federal judge
- Aloysius Schwartz (1930–1992), American priest
- Alvin Schwartz (children's author) (1927–1992), American author and illustrator of children's books
- Alvin Schwartz (comics) (1916–2011), American comic-book writer

== See also ==
- Schwartz (surname)
