= Fact box =

Display format for medical information

A fact box is a simplified display format that presents evidence based data about the benefits and harms of medical treatments, screenings or interventions.

The format has been shown to improve people’s understanding of health-related risk information. Benefits and harms are displayed in absolute numbers in a table, which allows the user to compare outcomes for people who received a particular treatment or intervention with outcomes for people who did not receive this treatment (or who received a placebo, e.g., a sugar pill). Fact boxes do not use statistics that might be misleading to the reader, such as relative risks, mismatched framing and five-year survival rates for screening. In addition, an explanation of medical terms and procedures is provided. Fact boxes can be used for discussing treatment alternatives with a physician. Moreover, additional information sources can be provided by using digital media to visually present the information contained in fact boxes.

== Fact box: Main features ==
There are several key features of a fact box. First, a summary statement describes the benefits and harms of a medical treatment without giving an explicit recommendation about which option is optimal for the reader. To avoid any ambiguities in interpreting the content, explicit and exhaustive information about the target population (e.g. gender, age range), date or time span of data collection and all additional information that may have an influence on the understanding of the reported facts are presented. To inform the user about the most important benefits and harms, these are stated explicitly, preferably as a list of statements or questions. Moreover, a fact box presents comparisons of outcomes, usually between treatment and control groups, which are based on research results (preferably meta-analyses or systematic reviews, or randomized controlled trials). To promote a good understanding of the results, an effect measure for each group should be provided in terms of frequencies, i.e. absolute numbers out of a given sample size of, e.g., 100 or 1000 cases. To report the current state of scientific evidence, for continuous measurements common descriptive statistics like mean, mean difference or median should be presented; in case of unquantifiable outcomes the evidence can be described in a statement. Finally, sources for all information have to be listed and a date when the material was assembled or updated needs to be provided.

== Fact box: Use and implementation ==
Based on an early format known as the balance sheet, this simple tabular format has been adopted by different health organizations, e.g. National Health and Medical Research Council, U.S. Preventive Services Task Force and Cochrane, to evaluate and communicate the results of health interventions. In the current format, fact boxes have been developed for use with lay audiences to communicate about prescription medications (e.g., the drugs facts box) and cancer screenings. Fact boxes are disseminated on a number of health topics such as vaccinations, surgical procedures, nutritional supplements, cancer screening tests and to reduce decisional conflict about antibiotics for pneumonia and artificial hydration in advanced dementia.

== See also ==
- Informulary, a company that publishes drug fact boxes
