= Amy Schwartz =

Amy Schwartz may refer to:

- Amy Schwartz (sportsperson) (born 1969), former American professional tennis player and amateur golfer
- Amy Schwartz (author) (1954 – 2023), American author and illustrator of children's books
- Amy Schwartz Moretti (born 1975), American violinist

== See also ==
- Schwartz (surname)
