= Laila Schwartz =

Israeli artist, curator, author and film director

- ליילה שוורץ
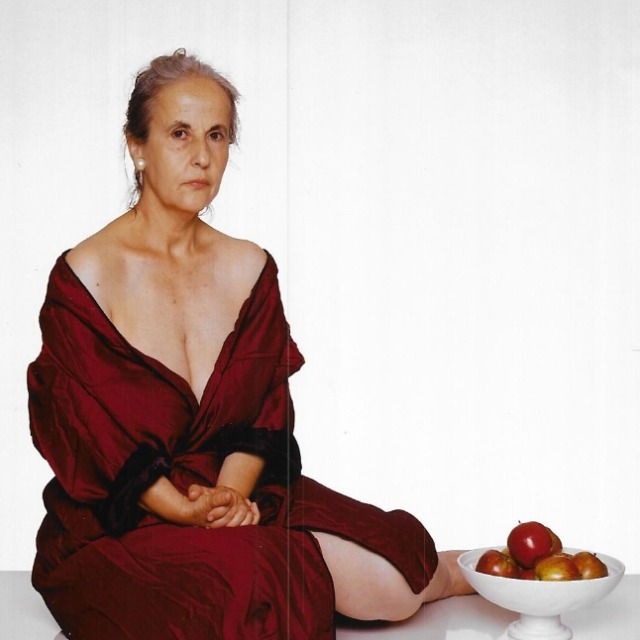
- Laila Scwartz in 2011, photographed by Uri Gershoni
- Born: Lucy Levi; 13 July 1949; Cairo, Egypt
- Known for: Performance art, Nude model
- Notable work: "Life in Garbage"

Laila Schwartz (Hebrew: ליילה שוורץ; born 13 July 1949) is an Israeli artist, curator, author and film director who uses her body as the medium for performance art and visual art.

== Biography ==
=== Birth and childhood ===
Schwartz was born on 13 July 1949 as "Lucy Levi" in Cairo, Egypt to Rachel Schwartz, of Jewish Ashkenazi descent, and Bernard Levy, of Jewish Sephardic descent, originally from Lebanon. Her mother came from a wealthy family who owned a printing business as well as a wholesale firm which focused on liquor. Schwartz's father worked as a delivery boy for her mother's family business and the two fell in love and married against the will of the family. Due to that, they emigrated to Egypt, where Schwartz was born.

When Schwartz was 4 months old, she and her mother immigrated to Israel while her father stayed back in Egypt and was due to join them after sorting the family's affairs. However, during this time her father converted to Islam, vanished, and was never seen again. The two women settled in the ma'abara Pardes Hana. When Schwartz was 3 years old she was placed in the care of a foster family due to her mother's inability to provide and care for her as a single mother. Schwartz was neglected and transferred repeatedly between families, living with a total of 5 during her early childhood, until being returned to her mother's home when she got older. When Schwartz was 12 years old, she moved to the 'Young Shomer' Kibbutz Beit Zera for education and care, again due to her mother's inability to provide. She remained there until her mother's death, but maintained a strong connection with her.

When Schwartz was 18 years old, and waiting to receive a mandatory conscription order for the Israel Defense Forces, her mother's health severely deteriorated. Due to that she was preemptively discharged and returned to Pardes Hana to care for her mother, who died two years later. During this time, she provided for the two as a teacher and mentor for at-risk youths, as her mother could no longer work.

Later in life, during her 8-year long European art career, Schwartz sought after relatives who remained in Europe in an attempt to look for her father. During this time she lived for a short while in Belgium, where she worked as a cleaning lady in a brothel. Upon returning to Israel Schwartz counselled youths at Beit Berl College.

=== First steps in the Israeli art world ===
==== Becoming a nude model ====
Schwartz first started modeling for artists in 1966 after a neighbour asked her to model in the nude for an art class in the kibbutz. Soon after her mother's death, she began working as a nude model for various artists, painters, sculptors and photographers. She once stated that ahe was drawn to the art world, and used nudity as a medium for expression as well as improving her self body image, although she later stated the decision as being driven by the need to escape debt. Later in her career, Schwartz began asking for copies of artistic works of her image rather than receive monetary payment. In her book, Schwartz described the decision:

I was born substance - alone in the world, with no identity. Sensations and memories build the basis to my personality. At some point in my life - when I was left defenseless, with no family, with no education, with no friendship - the only thing I had left was my body. Out of necessity I clung to it. This body, which I did not find beautiful in everyday terms, I trusted it. I knew that the body will not cheat and through it I could achieve truth, beauty, understanding. The state of weakness I turned into interest and power.

— 55 Laila and Laila.

During her nude-modeling career, Schwartz modeled for some of the greatest modern Israeli artists including Menashe Kadishman, Ori Reisman, Raffi Lavie, Igael Tumarkin, Hanoch Piven, Batia Lishansky, Yadid Rubin, Meir Pichhadze, Uri Gershuni, Haim Maor, Siona Shimshi, Yair Garbuz, Maya Cohen Levy, and Avigdor Stematsky. (Note: Yizhar Ben Nahum, שבעים ליילה וליילה, Kenes Media, April 27, 2020.) Schwartz mentioned in the past that she made a goal for her self to "bring the art to the Israeli street", and from the subsequent eccentric lifestyle she adopted her unique identity. Given that, she viewed modelling as an active rather than passive role, as was common during those days, and made sure to take active part in planning and executing the artistic process. Many artists liked Schwartz's perception of her role after learning to value the possibilities it entails.

==== Performance art ====
Schwartz's independent artistic endeavours began during her time working as a cleaning lady in Brussels, Belgium. Schwartz offered herself as a singing act to the hotel owner who was her boss. She performed a party for aristocrats, where she "was not allowed to finish the first number".

During her time working as a nude model, Schwartz began taking an active part in directing the artwork which presented her body. She also began creating performance art focusing on contemporary Israeli political issues. Many of the works she executed, such as "Black Performance" ("מיצג שחור"), "Life in Garbage" ("החיים בזבל"), "Slaughter House" ("בית מטבחיים"), "Medical Display" ("מיצג רפואי") and "Gas Mask" ("מסכת גז"), gained media and critical attention, and elevated her status in the Israeli artistic world.

"Life in Garbage" ("החיים בזבל") especially, in which Schwartz was photographed nude among the garbage mountains of Hiria, received critical acclaim, and was recreated during the 50-year celebrations of Israel's independence. Schwartz claimed the project's original intent was to warn against social separation in Israeli society. In 1994, during Israel's 50th independence day celebrations she recreated the project, this time lying on a bed with the Israeli national flag used as a sheet. (Note: 50 שנה למדינה "היא לא מזויפת", ליילה שוורץ, כתבה של יגאל מוסקו on YouTube)

=== Artistic exhibitions ===
Celebrating the third decade of her artistic career, "Amanut La'Am" institution decided to hold an exhibition of Schwartz's works, and chose Schwartz to act as curator.

In 2003, Schwartz published a book, "55 Laila and Laila", a play on the meaning of her name, being "Black Night", and the Hebrew name for One Thousand and One Nights. In the book she curated 55 works where her body is the subject of the work. In 2007 Schwartz was featured, among other artists, in the television program "Sipur Misgeret", which aimed to "map, categorize and tell the story of a 100 years of Israeli art". (Note: Dana Gillerman, איום בצווי מניעה על סדרת העוסקת באמנות ישראלית, Ha'Aretz, November 11, 2007.) Schwartz claimed that the production company omitted her name, and only her name, from promotions of the program prior to broadcast. (Note: Jack Faber, נוכחים ונפקדים, nrg, 21 November 2007) Schwartz threatened to request an injunction against the production company, as she agreed to be filmed in the nude after she was pressured to do so, and her rights as an artist were impaired.

Celebrating the fifth decade of her artistic career, Schwartz decided to donate her large artistic collection, collected over the years from artists whom she modeled for in lieu of payment. Schwartz published an ad in national newspapers and eventually donated her collection to Tel-Hai Academic College, which set up a permanent exhibit called "Laila". (Note: ליילה שוורץ תרמה אוסף נדיר שלה כמודל עירום, July 7, 2022) (Note: "פנים ביזנטיות, גוף מזרחי, חשיבה מערבית"- אוסף ליילה שוורץ on YouTube)

==== Exhibits containing works which featured Schwartz's image ====
- 1983 - Mapo Gallery owned by Israel Gerciany, curated by Laila Schwartz.
- 1983-1984 - Black Exhibit, Dizengoff Center, curated by Ziva Ron.
- 1984 - Tel Aviv, Israel Painters and Sculptors Association, curated by Laila Schwartz.
- 1991 - Bonn Women's Museum, curated by Laila Schwartz.
- 2003 - Kalisher Gallery for Contemporary Art, curated by Laila Schwartz.

== Activism ==
Schwartz is vocal about being a resident in finanacial assisted public housing in Ramat Aviv, an affluent neighbourhood in Tel Aviv. According to her, she has been an activist for public housing, tenants' rights and elderly rights since 2010. (Note: A Facebook post regarding Schwartz's activism, Posted by Schwartz on August 6, 2023)

== In the media ==
Schwartz credited the Israeli media for much of her success and survival despite her poor upbringing. In her book she dedicated a chapter to media coverage she received titled "I was not abandoned". Schwartz first appeared in the media in a local newspaper in Haifa in 1967.

== Personal life ==
During the 1980s she had a fling with Israeli poet Nathan Zach, although she stated that she might be asexual. She resides in Tel Aviv.

== Filmography ==
- "Uri Talking About Uri" (2004) - a documentary depicting the life and creation of the painter Ori Reisman. (Note: Merav Judelovitch, סרטי אמנות יוקרנו בחודש הבא בסינמטקים, Ynet, November 22, 2004.)
