= John Schwarz =

John Schwarz may refer to:

- John Schwarz, mayor of Savannah, Georgia for 1889–1891
- John Henry Schwarz (born 1941), American theoretical physicist
- John J. H. Schwarz (born 1937), American politician
- John E. Schwarz (born 1939), American political scientist
- John G. Schwarz (born 1950), business executive and entrepreneur

== See also ==
- John Schwartz (disambiguation)
