= Richard Schwartz =

Richard Schwartz may refer to:

- Richard Schwartz (bridge) (1943–2019), American bridge player
- Richard Schwartz (engineer), American aerospace engineer
- Richard Schwartz (mathematician) (born 1966), American mathematician
- Richard Schwartz (politician) (born c. 1959), New York politician and businessperson
- Richard C. Schwartz, creator of the Internal Family Systems branch of psychotherapy
- Richard D. Schwartz (1925–2017), American sociologist
- Richard H. Schwartz (born 1934), vegetarian and animal rights activist
- Rick Schwartz (born 1967), American film and television producer

== See also ==
- Richard Schwarz (1890–?), German-Russian track and field athlete
