= Jacob Schwartz =

Jacob Schwartz may refer to:

- Jacob T. Schwartz (1930–2009), American mathematician and computer scientist
- Jack Lawrence (songwriter) (Jacob Schwartz, 1912–2009), American musician
- Jacob Schwartz (librarian) (1846–1926), American librarian
