= Martin Schwartz =

Martin Schwartz may refer to:

- Martin S. Schwartz (born 1945), American stock trader
- Martin Schwartz (mercenary) (died 1487), German mercenary
- Martin Schwartz (rower) (born 1971), American lightweight rower
- Martin A. Schwartz, American cell biologist, biomedical engineer, and cardiovascular researcher
