= Bio-Rad Laboratories =

American biotechnology firm

Coordinates: 38°1′23.52″N 122°16′40.35″W

Bio-Rad Laboratories, Inc.

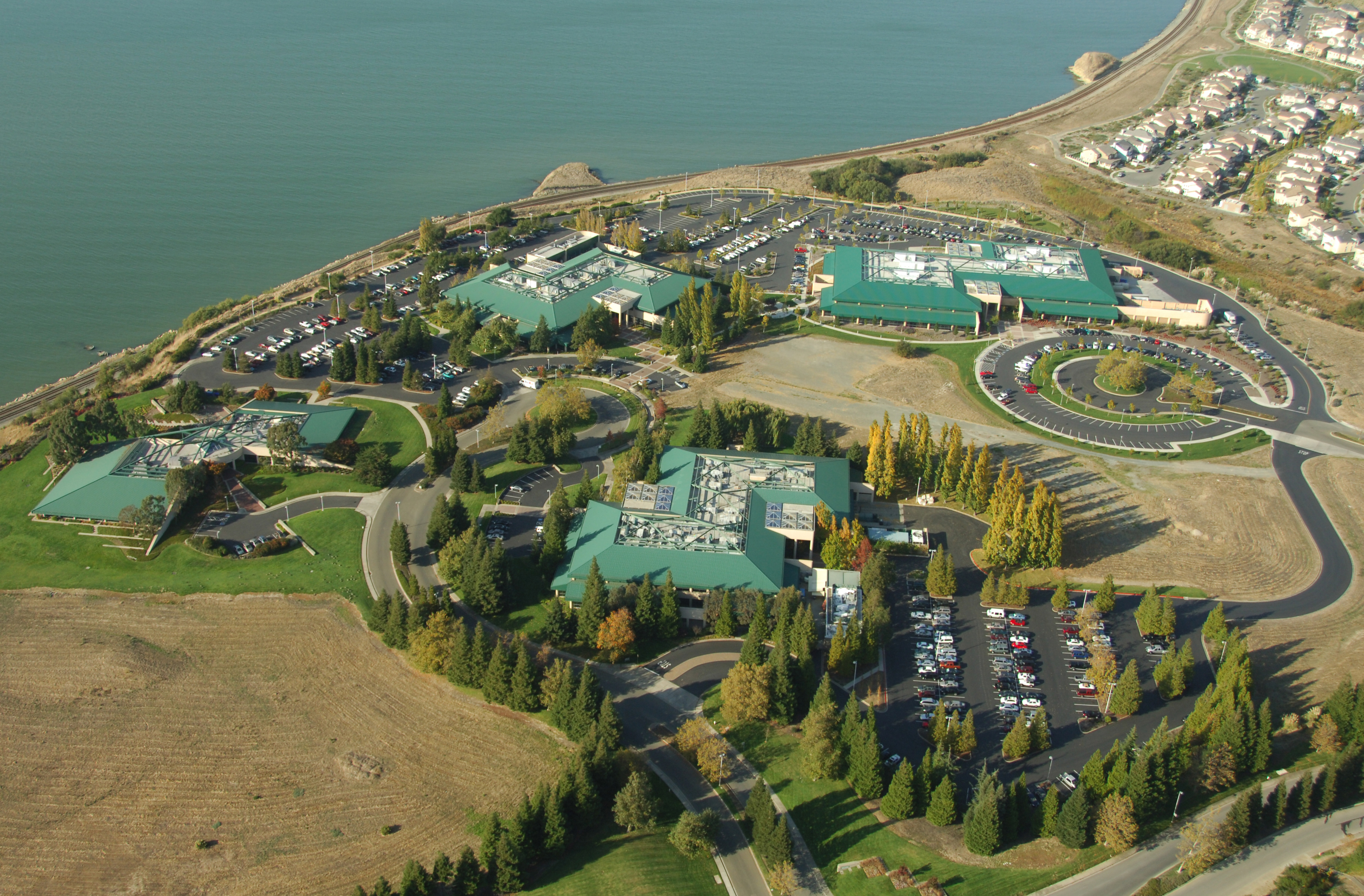
- Bio-Rad Laboratories is based in Hercules, California, located along the San Francisco Bay.
- Type: Public
- Traded as: NYSE: BIO (Class A); S&P 400 component
- Industry: Medical laboratories; life science research
- Founded: 1952; 74 years ago
- Founders: David Schwartz; Alice Schwartz
- Headquarters: Hercules, California, U.S.
- Area served: Global
- Key people: Norman Schwartz; (Chairman & CEO); Jonathan DiVincenzo; (COO); Roop Lakkaraju; (CFO); Michael Crowley; (EVP Global Commercial Operations); James Barry; (President, Life Science Group); Eva Engelhardt; (President, Clinical Diagnostics Group)
- Revenue: ▼US$2.57 billion (2024)
- Operating income: ▼US$269 million (2024)
- Net income: ▼US$−1.8 billion (2024)
- Total assets: ▼US$9.36 billion (2024)
- Total equity: ▼US$6.57 billion (2024)
- Number of employees: 7,700 (2024)
- Website: bio-rad.com

Bio-Rad Laboratories, Inc. is an American developer and manufacturer of specialized technological products for the life science research and clinical diagnostics markets. The company was founded in 1952 in Berkeley, California, by husband and wife team David and Alice Schwartz, both graduates of the University of California, Berkeley. Bio-Rad is based in Hercules, California, and has operations worldwide.

== Business segments ==
Bio-Rad's life science products primarily include instruments, software, consumables, reagents, and content for the areas of cell biology, gene expression, protein purification, protein quantitation, drug discovery and manufacture, food safety, and science education. These products are based on technologies to separate, purify, identify, analyze, and amplify biological materials such as antibodies, proteins, nucleic acids, cells, and bacteria.

Bio-Rad's diagnostic products and systems use a range of technologies and provide clinical information in the blood transfusion, diabetes monitoring, autoimmune, and infectious disease testing markets. These products are used to support the diagnosis, monitoring, and treatment of diseases and other medical conditions.

== History ==
Bio-Rad Laboratories was founded in 1952 by David Schwartz and his wife Alice, both recent graduates of the University of California, Berkeley. In 1976, Bio-Rad acquired Environmental Chemical Specialties (ECS), a producer of human control serum.

In 2008, Bio-Rad were notable for being the opening bell ringers at the New York Stock Exchange on 24 October, a date which went down in financial history as 'Bloody Friday', which saw many of the world's stock exchanges experience the worst declines in their history, with drops of around 10% in most indices.

In 2011, Bio-Rad acquired a new technology, droplet digital PCR. Droplet digital PCR allows scientists to distinguish rare sequences in tumors and precisely measure copy number variation.

In January 2013, Bio-Rad purchased AbD Serotec, a division of MorphoSys AG. This added Serotec's more than 15,000 antibodies, kits, and accessories to Bio-Rad's portfolio of research and clinical diagnostic products.

In 2016, the company had direct distribution channels in over 35 countries outside the United States through subsidiaries whose focus is sales, customer service and product distribution. In some locations outside and inside these 35 countries, sales efforts were supplemented by distributors and agents.

In 2017, Bio-Rad acquired RainDance Technologies, a droplet-based PCR systems manufacturer.

In March 2021, Bio-Rad announced a partnership with Roche.

=== Vickers Instruments ===
In 1989, Bio-Rad purchased the British instrument-making firm, Vickers (1828 - 1999), apart from their defense products, which were sold to British Aerospace. This company had been known until 1963 as Cooke, Troughton & Simms. Cooke, Troughton & Simms was formed in 1922 by the merging of T. Cooke & Sons, a York-based instrument maker founded in 1837 by the self-taught schoolmaster Thomas Cooke, and the London instrument-maker, Troughton & Simms founded in 1828 by Edward Troughton who began his apprenticeship in 1773.

=== Bioradiations ===
Bioradiations is an online magazine created by Bio-Rad that offers researchers case studies, whitepapers, tips, techniques, and topics related to Bio-Rad products and services. Bioradiations began as a print magazine that was launched in 1965 and was printed until 2011 and replaced with the online publication.

=== FCPA bribery lawsuits ===
From 2005 to 2010, Bio-Rad subsidiaries made bribes to foreign government officials, and made other payments intentionally ignoring the high likelihood of bribery. The bribes were estimated to have made $35.1 million profit for Bio-Rad, primarily from sales in Russia, Vietnam, and Thailand:

- In Russia, bribes were made as payments to foreign agents with phony Moscow addresses and off-shore bank accounts. These foreign agents aimed to win government contracts by influencing Russia's Ministry of Health.
- In Vietnam, Bio-Rad's Singapore subsidiary regularly paid bribes to Vietnamese government officials. A regional sales manager raised concerns about this practice, and in response another employee proposed employing a middleman to pay the bribes instead.
- In Thailand, Bio-Rad acquired Diamed Thailand with very little due diligence. Diamed Thailand was running an existing scheme to bribe government officials, which Bio-Rad's Asia Pacific General Manager later found out about in March 2008. They initiated an investigation, which confirmed the bribery was occurring, however did not instruct Diamed Thailand to stop the bribery and the payments continued until 2010.

In 2017, Bio-Rad paid $55 million to settle cases with the Department of Justice and the Securities and Exchange Commission for violating the Foreign Corrupt Practices Act (FCPA). The company was accused of failing to prevent or detect bribes to foreign officials, and for falsifying its books to hide these bribes as legitimate expenses.

=== Whistleblower retaliation lawsuit ===
In 2013, Bio-Rad's general counsel of 25 years, Sanford Wadler, followed internal whistleblowing procedures by reporting suspected bribery to Bio-Rad's audit committee, believing Bio-Rad had falsified books and records. The company fired him for making this report, which the courts found to amount to California common law wrongful discharge in violation of public policy.

In 2017, a federal jury awarded Wadler with a $10.9 million settlement. This was appealed by Bio-Rad, and in 2019 the US appeals court reduced this to $7.96 million, plus $3.5 million in attorneys' fees and costs.

== See also ==
- Laboratory equipment
- List of S&P 500 companies
