= Micheline Gingras =

American painter (born 1947)

Micheline Gingras (born 1947, Québec City, Canada) is a Canadian-born American artist known for large-scale collage and mixed-media works addressing political, social, and environmental themes. Working across painting, sculpture, collage, photography, and drawing, she first gained recognition in the early 1970s for her Mechanical Hand series, which was exhibited in Canada, the United States and France. Since the late 2000s, she has developed an extensive body of mixed-media collage works combining newspaper imagery and painted elements. Gingras taught art at Saint Ann's School in Brooklyn, New York, from 1979 to 2016.

== Early life and education ==
Micheline Gingras was born in Québec City, Canada, on December 16, 1947. She is 10th generation Québécoise. The sixth of seven children, Gingras was born to Roméo Gingras and Rosée Dubois. Her parents both came from subsistence farming families outside the city before relocating to pursue economic opportunities in Québec City. Gingras pursued her studies at École des beaux-arts de Québec (which was later absorbed by Université Laval) and graduated in 1969 with a Master of Fine Arts. At the 1967 International and Universal Exposition, better known as Expo 67, Gingras served as a guide at the Canadien Pavilion Art Gallery; an image of her in uniform was featured on the cover of Pace Magazine, July 1967. In 1970, Gingras moved to New York City.

== Early work and recognition (1970–1980) ==
Gingras’s earliest major body of work was the Mechanical Hand series (1971–1975), consisting of paintings, drawings, and photographs of sculptural object depicting a large hand articulated with hinges at the joints, placed within urban industrial landscapes. The series was first exhibited at the Infinity Group Gallery in Chelsea, New York in 1972. Soon after, the exhibition traveled to Canada and France as “La Main Mécanique.” It went on view at La Maison des Arts La Sauvegarde in Montréal in 1972 and the Musée du Québec in 1973. In 1975, the series was chosen to represent Canadian painting at Centre Culturel Canadien (Canadian Cultural Centre) in Paris, alongside a solo-exhibition of paintings by Guido Molinari. During this period of activity, Le Counseil des Arts du Canada (Canadian Arts Council) awarded Gingras two grants in painting; they were conferred in 1973 and 1974. She also received another grant from Le Ministère des Affaires Culturelles du Québec (Ministry of Cultural Affairs of Québec) in 1976.

Gingras produced several additional painting series during the 1970s. Among them was Blanc sur Blanc, also known as White on White in English. This exhibition included large scale photo-sensitized paintings, oil on linen, and collages on paper. Describing Gingras' work for The Montreal Star, art critic Henry Lehmann explained that each “huge grey canvas” was “filled with gigantic human hands holding substances such as soap, feathers, shaving cream, and toothpaste. Gingras has intervened on what are actually huge photo reproductions…” Throughout 1976, the show was presented at Musée d'art contemporain de Montréal, the Kornblee Gallery in New York, and the Canadian Cultural Centre in London.

In 1977-79, a third body of work, “Origin” was created, illustrating the evolution and journey of man. The work was exhibited at the downtown South West Gallery in New York City, June 1979.

In 1975, a panel of prominent Canadian curators and gallerists were asked to name “promising artists” from Canada. Fifteen artists were selected by panelists including Paul Wong; Karen Wilkin, and Roald Nasgaard. Upon being selected by the committee, Gingras’ paintings were described in an accompanying article in Canada’s National Post Impetus, “Design and color, strange perspective, a photo-realistic attention to detail and the extraordinary juxtaposition of seemingly ordinary elements all tend to create a nightmarish atmosphere, especially in her Mechanical Hand series.” Later in 1980, when Canadian curator and writer Guy Robert published La Peinture au Québec (Painting in Québec) in 1978, he juxtaposed Gingras’ work with that of Jennifer Dickson, stating they both “offer us unsettling glimpses into the human condition.”

By the late 1970s Gingras became disillusioned with the commercial gallery system and largely withdrew from exhibiting in commercial venues. In 1980 Gingras joined the faculty of Saint Ann’s School in Brooklyn Heights, a progressive school founded in 1965 by Stanley Bosworth; she primarily taught art to fourth- and fifth-grade students, as well as figure drawing classes for adults. She remained at the school until 2016.

== Collaborations with Raymon Elozua ==
Gingras met the artist Raymon Elozua in 1981 and the two began an ongoing collaborative partnership. For their first joint project, Elozua constructed large ceramic models of dilapidated drive-in movie screens, on which Gingras painted imagery of romantic cinematic couples.

In 1989, the pair participated in a residency at the Watershed Center for the Ceramic Arts in Maine, where they produced a group of figurative sculptures that combined terra cotta, steel, and oil paint. In 1992, they collaborated on a series of nearly life-size works known as the Demon and Sirens series, shown at the Habatat Shaw Gallery, Detroit, Michigan. Examples from this collaboration would be featured at the American Craft Museum (now the Museum of Arts and Design) in Confrontational Clay, a group exhibition curated by Judith S. Schwartz which explored socially-critical ceramic art. The sculptures were constructed from welded rebar and wire armatures covered with terra-cotta clay.

== Later work ==
Beginning in the late 2000s Gingras returned to full-time studio production and developed a large body of mixed-media collage works made primarily from current newspaper imagery with painterly elements. These works often combine mass-media images with hand-painted components to create layered compositions addressing political conflict, environmental crisis, and social anxiety. These collages were shown in conjunction with Raymon Elozua’s sculptures at the Grocery Store Gallery, Mountaindale, New York, as part of the Mountaindale Biennales in 2015, 2018 & 2023.

== Museum collections ==
Gingras's work is held in the collections of the Musée national des beaux-arts du Québec, the Musée d'art contemporain de Montréal, the Mint Museum, the Musée de Joliette, and the Yale University Art Gallery.

- Musée National des Beaux-Arts du Québec
- Musée d’Art Contemporain, Montréal
- Musée de Joliette, Québec
- Mint Museum of Art, Charlotte
- Yale University Art Museum

== Personal life ==
Gingras lives in Brooklyn, NY and maintains a studio in Mountaindale, New York, with artist Raymon Elozua, with whom she shares a long-standing artistic partnership. There she and Elozua opened separate artist studios, an exhibition space, and the Mountaindale Bienniale.
