= Jonathan Schwartz =

Jonathan Schwartz or Jon Schwartz may refer to:

- Jon Schwartz (drummer) (born 1956), drummer with singer-songwriter "Weird Al" Yankovic
- Jonathan Schwartz (radio personality) (born 1938), radio disc jockey
- Jonathan I. Schwartz (born 1965), former president and CEO of Sun Microsystems
- Jonathan Ira Schwartz (born 1982), American film producer, known as director of the 2005 film Frostbite
- Jonathan Schwartz (producer), American producer, known for the 2011 film Like Crazy
- Jonathan Schwartz (film producer), American producer, best known for his work at Marvel Studios

== See also ==
- John Schwartz (disambiguation)
