= Jeffrey Schwartz =

Jeff(rey) or Geoff(rey) Schwartz may refer to:

- Geoff Schwartz (born 1986), American Jewish NFL football player
- Jeff A. Schwartz (born 1964), American sports agent
- Jeffrey E Schwartz (born 1958), American custom chassis and car builder
- Jeffrey H. Schwartz (born 1948), American anthropologist
- Jeffrey M. Schwartz, American psychiatrist

== See also ==
- Jeffrey Schwarz (born 1969), filmmaker and producer
