= Joseph Schwartz =

Joseph Schwartz or Joseph Schwarz may refer to:

- Joseph Schwartz (architect) (1858–1927), architect of Sioux Falls, South Dakota
- Joseph A. Schwarcz, chemistry professor
- Joseph M. Schwartz (born 1954), political theorist and left political activist
- Joseph Schwartz, owner of the San Diego Mariners ice hockey team
- Joseph Schwarz (baritone) (1880–1926), Russian-born German baritone
- Joseph Schwarz (geographer) (1804–1865), Jewish geographer, Palestine researcher and rabbi

== See also ==
- Edward Joseph Schwartz (1912–2000), United States federal judge
