= Norman Schwartz =

American businessman

- Born: Norman David Schwartz; 1950 or 1951 (age 75–76)
- Occupation: Businessman
- Title: Chairman and CEO, Bio-Rad Laboratories
- Term: 2003-
- Predecessor: David Schwartz
- Mother: Alice Schwartz

Norman David Schwartz (born 1950 or 1951) is an American businessman, and the chairman and CEO of Bio-Rad Laboratories, an American life sciences company founded by his parents.

He is the son of David and Alice Schwartz, who co-founded Bio-Rad in 1952 in a Quonset hut in Berkeley, California.

In 2003, he succeeded his father as president and CEO of Bio-Rad.
