= Paul Schwartz =

Paul Schwartz may refer to:

- Paul Schwartz (composer) (born 1956), American record producer, composer, arranger, conductor, and pianist
- Paul Schwartz (politician) (1940–2026), president of the Jewish Community of Bucharest, Romania
- Paul M. Schwartz (born 1959), American legal scholar
- Paul Hampton (born 1937), né Schwartz, American actor, singer, lyricist and writer
