= Charles Schwartz =

Charles Schwartz may refer to:

- Charles W. Schwartz (1914–1991), wildlife artist
- Charles Schwartz Jr. (1922–2012), United States federal judge

== See also ==
- Sherwood Schwartz (Sherwood Charles Schwartz, 1916–2011), American television producer
