= Manfred Schwartz =

American artist

- Born: November 11, 1909; Łódź, Poland
- Died: November 7, 1970 (age 60); New York City, United States
- Education: University of Paris; Académie de la Grande Chaumière; Art Students League of New York; National Academy of Design
- Occupation: Artist
- Spouse(s): Clara Apfel (predeceased); Anne Schnall
- Children: Paul Waldo Schwartz

Manfred Schwartz (November 11, 1909 in Łódź, Poland – November 7, 1970 in New York City, United States) was a Polish-born American artist who was educated at the Sorbonne in Paris, the Académie de la Grande Chaumière in Paris, the Art Students League of New York, and the National Academy of Design in New York City. He also studied with Charles Hawthorne, John Sloan, and George Bridgman.

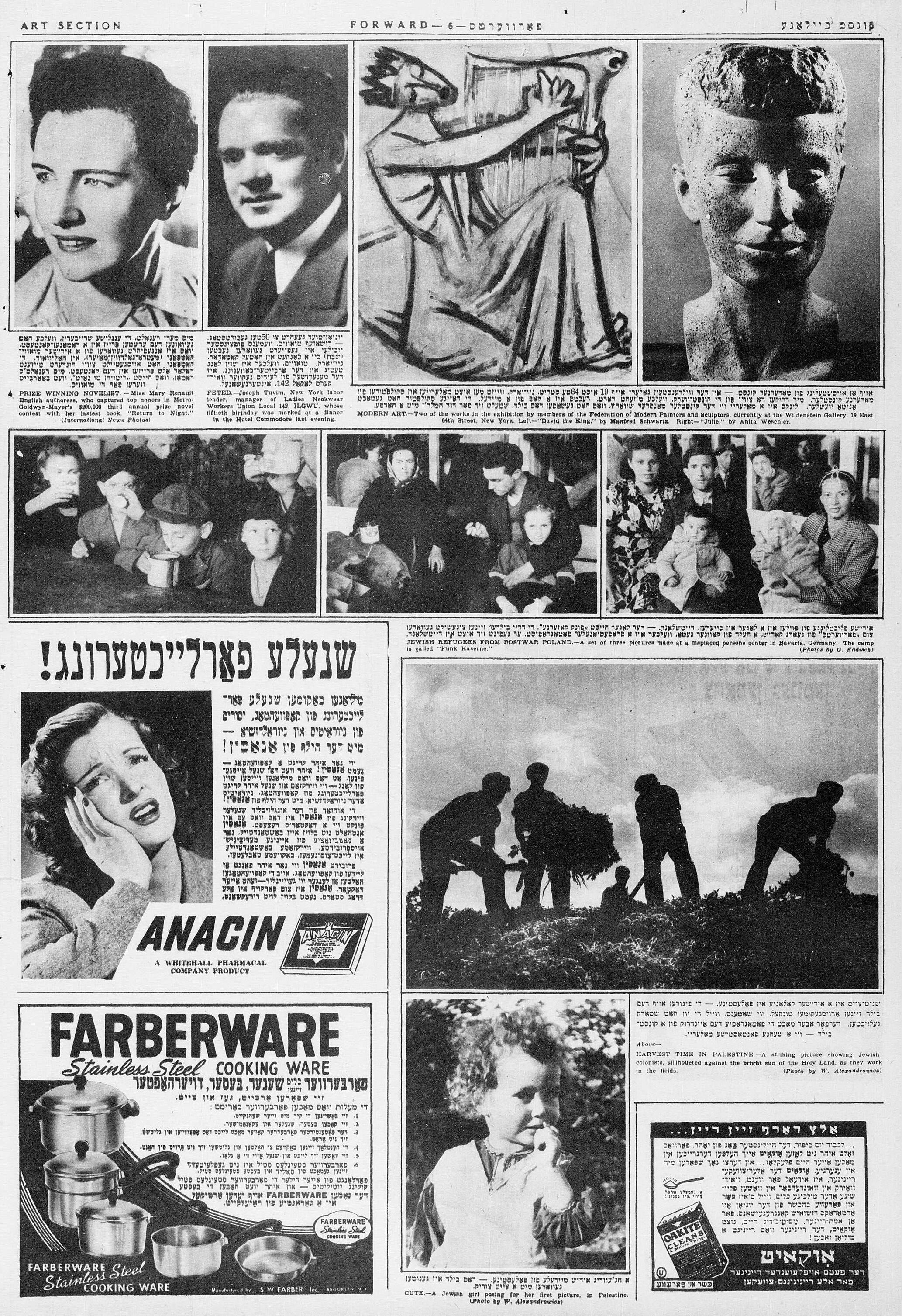
Schwartz's work (top row, second from right) featured in the art section of The Jewish Daily Forward, September 29, 1946

Schwartz married twice. His first wife, advertising executive Clara Apfel, died in 1964; they had one son, Paul Waldo Schwartz, an art critic in Paris. In 1966, he married Anne Schnall, the former wife of investor, M. Elliot Schnall. After his death he was interred at Montefiore Cemetery in Queens, New York.
