= Mark Schwartz =

Mark Schwartz may refer to:

- Mark Schwartz (soccer), American soccer forward
- Mark C. Schwartz, United States Army general
- Mark D. Schwartz, American attorney
