= Bernard Schwartz (disambiguation) =

Bernard Schwartz may refer to:

- Bernard Schwartz (producer) (1917–2003), American producer
- Bernard L. Schwartz (1925–2024), American businessman
- Tony Curtis (born Bernard Schwartz; 1925–2010), American actor
