= Lester O. Schwartz =

19th century American artist

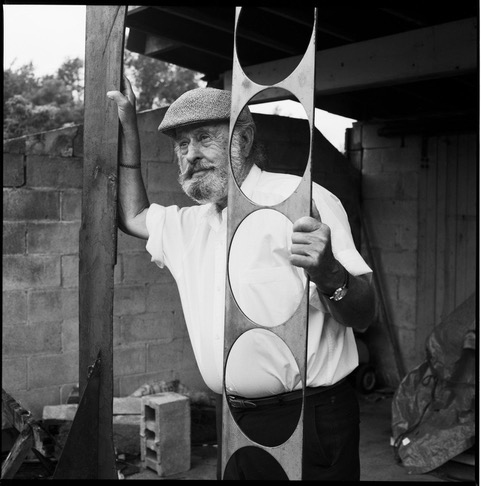
- Lester O. Schwartz stands next to one of his sculptures
- Born: 29 June 1912; Manitowoc, Wisconsin
- Died: 16 May 2006 (aged 93); Ripon, Wisconsin
- Education: School of the Art Institute of Chicago
- Known for: Painting, drawing, printmaking, sculpting
- Spouse: Gloria Greco

Lester O. Schwartz (29 June 1912 - 16 May 2006) was an American painter, sculptor and printmaker who was born in Manitowoc, Wisconsin. Schwartz studied at the School of the Art Institute of Chicago under the direction of Boris Anisfeld, a Russian-American painter and theater designer. In 1937, the Art Institute of Chicago awarded Schwartz the Edward L. Ryerson Traveling Fellowship of $2500.00, which funded a two year long expedition to the South Pacific, Europe, and Asia. During his travels he met Pablo Picasso at Le Dôme Café in Paris. This meeting would heavily influence Schwartz and his future art.

== Early life and education ==
Lester O. Schwartz was born on 29 June 1912 in the city of Manitowoc, Wisconsin. He was the sixth child of Abraham Schwartz (1875-1956) and Martha Stein (1881-1967). Both of Schwartz's parents were Russian Jews who fled Russia in the late 19th century. Upon entering America through Ellis Island and settling in Manitowoc, Schwartz's father worked as a scrap peddler. Despite early financial troubles, the scrap business transitioned into the eventual creation of the Wisconsin Aluminum Foundry (WAF) in 1909. The family was of middle class background by the time of Schwartz's birth. Schwartz attended Lincoln High School in Manitowoc, where he became the Art Editor for his school newspaper, "The Manitou". He worked as a cartoonist for various local newspapers throughout his high school career.

Upon high school graduation in 1930, Schwartz received a full scholarship to the School of the Art Institute of Chicago for Commercial Art, however, by 1933 he had dropped out and moved back to his hometown. In Manitowoc, he set up an art studio in a vacant room at the Wisconsin Aluminum Foundry. In the fall of 1935, Schwartz moved back to Chicago to resume his studies. Under the mentorship of Boris Anisfeld, he continued his education as a Fine Art major.

During his first year back in Chicago, Schwartz won first prize in the "40th Annual Exhibition by Artists of Chicago & Vicinity" for one of his paintings. This brought him mild recognition, and his art was soon featured in Chicago magazines and newspapers. The American Federation of Arts included Schwartz in their 1937 edition of "Who's Who in American Art". In 1937, during his final months art the School of the Art Institute of Chicago, Schwartz won the Edward L. Ryerson Traveling Fellowship, receiving $2,500.00 and a steamship tour around the world.

== Early career and teaching ==
Following graduation at the School of the Art Institute of Chicago, Schwartz traveled throughout Europe and Asia, creating several hundred sketches and paintings. A majority of his art during this time period was inspired by the people he interacted with during his travels. While in Paris, Schwartz studied at the Académie Colarassi, and met Pablo Picasso at Le Dôme Cafe. Coincidently, shortly after meeting Picasso, Schwartz received a letter from the Dean of the School of the Art Institute of Chicago informing him that his art was on exhibit at the Georgine Shillard-Smith gallery, alongside works from Picasso. Later in 1939, Schwartz returned to Chicago.

Shortly after the return from his travels, Schwartz exhibited his work in both New York City and Chicago. He found brief residence at the Byrdcliffe Colony in Woodstock, New York, before enlisting in the United States Army in 1942. Schwartz served at Fort Belvoir and Fort Leonard Wood, where he painted camouflage on military equipment, and created art for the chapels on base. During this time, he painted a total of four murals, all depicting Jesus in various stages of life.

Shortly after leaving the Army in 1944, Schwartz began his first professional job as an instructor at the Layton School of Art. This was a temporary position, teaching outdoor sketching and painting for nine weeks. Later in 1944, Schwartz was hired by Clark G. Kuebler as Artist in Residence at Ripon, College, in Ripon, Wisconsin, which he would hold until 1977. For the rest of his life, Schwartz taught classes, and continued to exhibit his work around the United States.

== Accomplishments and influence ==
During his career, Schwartz worked with a variety of mediums including: oil, acrylic, gouache, etching, watercolor, lithograph, mobiles, and sculpture. During the 1990s and early 2000's, he opened his gallery to the public, showcasing a large volume of his work. Some of the most notable pieces included large metal sculptures made out of cars and scrap metal. In recent years, some of his most popular works include paintings from his "Kite", "Cosmos", and "Circus" series.

Schwartz's art is featured in many public and private collections around the world. Some of the most notable include: the Art Institute of Chicago, the Detroit Institute of Arts, the Miller Art Museum, the Newark Museum of Art, the Metropolitan Museum of Art, and the Smithsonian American Art Museum.

Lester Schwartz died on 16 May 2006 in Ripon, Wisconsin.
