= William Schwartz =

William Schwartz may refer to:

- Will Schwartz, American pop musician
- William Schwartz (law professor) (1933–2017), American law professor and corporate director
- William Schwartz (physician) (1922–2009), nephrologist
- William Bernstein Schwartz Jr. (1922–2010), American businessman and United States Ambassador to the Bahamas
- William C. Schwartz (1927–2000), civic leader in Central Florida and laser industry pioneer
- William J. Schwartz (born 1950), American neurologist and professor
- William S. Schwartz (1896–1977), American artist
