= Simon Schwartz =

Simon Schwartz or Schwarz may refer to:

- Simon Schwarz (born 1971), Austrian actor
- Simon Schwartz (artist) (born 1982), German illustrator and cartoonist
- Simon Schwartz, a partner in the American architectural firm Schwartz & Gross
