= Yadid Rubin =

Israeli painter (1938–2012)

- Born: August 24, 1938; Givat Haim, Mandatory Palestine
- Died: January 3, 2012 (aged 73)
- Known for: Painting

Yadid Rubin (Hebrew: ידיד רובין; August 24, 1938, Hadera – January 3, 2012) was an Israeli painter.

== Biography ==
Yadid Rubin was born in Kibbutz Givat Haim in 1938. Following the split in the kibbutz, his family joined Kibbutz Givat Haim Ihud. In the late 1950s he traveled with his family to Austria, where he studied for several months at the Academy of Fine Arts Vienna. After returning to Israel, he enlisted in the IDF and served as a paratrooper. After his military service, he studied at the Avni Institute, and in 1967, following a scholarship, he went to study at the Royal College of Art in London.

Robin has exhibited in many places in Israel and abroad. In the period before his death he worked in collaboration with Chelouche Gallery in Tel Aviv and Gallery in Los Angeles. Robin gained significant recognition only after his death.

== Style ==
Rubin is considered by many to be "the last painter of the Land of Israel." As one who studied under teachers such as Avigdor Stematsky and other great lyrical abstract, Robin “rebelled” in this tradition of painting while building his own personal language.

Unlike his teachers who painted in diluted and broken colors, Robin developed a more direct style that relied on highly saturated color strokes, inspired by expressive painters such as Van Gogh.

His early works, from the period after his return from London, were influenced by the abstract and geometric "Hard Edge" style. In the 70s of the 20th century he experimented with different styles. Among other things, he dealt with sculpture and conceptual art. In the 1980s, landscape painting became the central theme of his paintings. His works were characterized by intense color, expressive brushstrokes and a tendency to graphic style of the images.

His paintings are disguised as naive, with archetypal images of a tree, house and tractor painted in a naive and even schematic way, but a window into a complex painting that relies on color relationships and a color scheme. Through this style, a friend explores themes of life and emotion, using familiar images from the kibbutz where he lived.

== Exhibitions ==
=== Solo ===
- 2010 Plowed Color. Tel Aviv Museum of Art
- 2022 Yadid Rubin. Cheloche Gallery for Contemporary Art. Tel Aviv

== Collections ==
Yadid Rubin's works are kept in public collections in Israel and around the world, including The Israel Museum in Jerusalem.
