= Thomas Schwartz (disambiguation) =

Thomas or Tom Schwartz may refer to:

- Thomas Alan Schwartz, American historian
- Thomas Allen Schwartz (born 1945), recipient of the Purple Heart medal
- Tom Schwartz, American television personality and restaurateur
