= Informulary =

Informulary is a health research and information company.

== History ==
Inforumulary was founded by Lisa Miriam Schwartz, MD (1963–2018), and her husband (married October 25, 1992), Steven Edward Woloshin, MD, a professor at The Dartmouth Institute for Health Policy and Clinical Practice. At the time of the company’s founding, Schwartz was also a professor at the institute.

Until Schwartz’s death in 2018, she and Woloshin served as co-directors of the Center for Medicine and Media at the Dartmouth Institute, part of the Geisel School of Medicine at Dartmouth. There they trained hundreds of journalists to critically evaluate claims of scientific breakthroughs and “miracle cures,” and to communicate the benefits and risks of medical tests and treatments.

Woloshin is currently, as of 2025, Professor of The Dartmouth Institute, Professor of Medicine, and Professor of Community and Family Medicine at Dartmouth College.

== Products and services ==
Informulary publishes drug fact boxes. Consumers are one of the target audiences for these fact boxes. The organization assumes that consumer choice is important in deciding when to take drugs.

== Scholarly response ==
Woloshin and Schwartz have been criticized for their complaints about weight loss drugs. Through Informulary, Woloshin and Schwartz have criticized antidepressant use.
