= Kevie W. Schwartz =

American chemical engineer (1902-1974)

Kevie W. Schwartz (1902–1974) was an American chemical engineer and entrepreneur who developed a process and apparatus for electroplating. He served as President of the Chromium Products Corporation from 1923 to 1944 and founded Midtown Tennis Club in Chicago with his son, Alan G. Schwartz.

== Early life and education ==
Kevie Waldemar Schwartz was born in New York City on 3 June 1902. He was raised in Harlem and graduated from Stuyvesant High School at 15. He attended City College of New York for a year, before transferring to Columbia University, where he worked with Prof. Colin Fink, a pioneer in electrochemistry. He was awarded a Bachelor of Engineering in 1921 and a master's in chemical engineering in 1923.

== Inventions and career ==
While pursuing his master's degree at Columbia, Schwartz discovered the use of chromium as a soluble anode in acid chromium depositing baths containing CrO as the main electrolyzable component, which led to a more efficient plating process. This process was used extensively for both military and commercial purposes. During World War II, for example, it prolonged the functional life of parts in both submarines and airplanes.

Kevie Schwartz founded Midtown Tennis Club in 1970 with his son, Alan. He died at a club owned and operated by Midtown Tennis Club in Rochester, New York in 1972.

== Patents ==
Following is a list of patents issued to Kevie Schwartz:

- U.S. No. 1,673,779, Production of Hard, Wear-Resisting Material Printing Surfaces, 12 July 1928
- U.S. No. 1,688,060, Manufacture of Article of Cellulose Esters and Their Compositions, 16 October 1928
- U.S. No. 1,720,354, Method and Apparatus for Electrodepositing Chromium, 9 July 1929
- U.S. No. 1,794,487, Process and Apparatus for Electroplating, 3 March 1931

The patents filed for advances in chromium plating by Colin Fink and Kevie Schwartz were upheld by the Second Circuit Court in 1932.
