= Milton Schwartz =

Milton Schwartz may refer to:

- Milton Schwartz (spy), American
- Milton Lewis Schwartz (1920–2005), U.S. federal judge
- A character in Marjorie Morningstar (novel)
