= Ed Schwartz (disambiguation) =

Ed Schwartz may refer to:

- Ed Schwartz (1946–2009), Chicago media personality
- Eddie Schwartz (born 1949), Canadian songwriter and record producer
- Eduard Schwartz (1858–1940), classical philologist
- Eduardo Schwartz (born 1940), finance academic
- Edward Joseph Schwartz (1912–2000), American judge
