= James Schwartz =

James Schwartz may refer to:

- James H. Schwartz (politician) (1928–2015), member of the Iowa House of Representatives
- James H. Schwartz (neurobiologist) (1932–2006), American neurobiologist and professor
- Jim Schwartz (born 1966), American football coach
