= Harry Schwartz =

Harry Schwartz may refer to:

- Harry Schwartz (politician) (1869–1955), U.S. senator from Wyoming
- Harry Schwartz (American football) (1906–1970), college football player
- Harry Schwartz (journalist) (1919–2004), editorial writer of The New York Times

== See also ==
- Harry Schwarts (1918–1963), American baseball umpire
- Harry Schwarz (1924–2010), South African lawyer, statesman, and anti-apartheid activist
- Harry Swartz (born 1996), American soccer player
