= Richard D. Schwartz =

American sociologist

Richard Derecktor Schwartz (April 26, 1925 - October 10, 2017) was an American sociologist, focusing in natural law, administrative law, and the impact of welfare reform. He was the Ernest I. White Professor Emeritus at Syracuse University College of Law and formerly Dean and Professor at State University of New York at Buffalo. His appointment as a law school dean was unusual because he was not a lawyer; at the time of his appointment, the Association of American Law Schools believed that he was the only American law school dean who was not a lawyer. He was also an Elected Fellow of the American Political and Social Science Society. He also co-founded the Law and Society Association and in 1981 the Syracuse-Area Middle East Dialogue Group.

Schwartz contracted polio at the age of 18 but went on to receive a B.A. and Ph.D. from Yale University. He was married for 71 years until his death and had three children. Schwartz died on October 10, 2017, at the age of 92.
