= Samuel Schwartz =

Sam Schwartz may refer to:

- Sam Schwartz (fl. 1970s–2010s), a.k.a. Gridlock Sam
- Samm Schwartz (1920–1997), American comic artist
- Samuel Schwartz (race walker) (1882–1943), American racewalker

== See also ==
- Samuel Schwarz (disambiguation)
