= Alice Schwartz =

American businesswoman (1925/1926–2025)

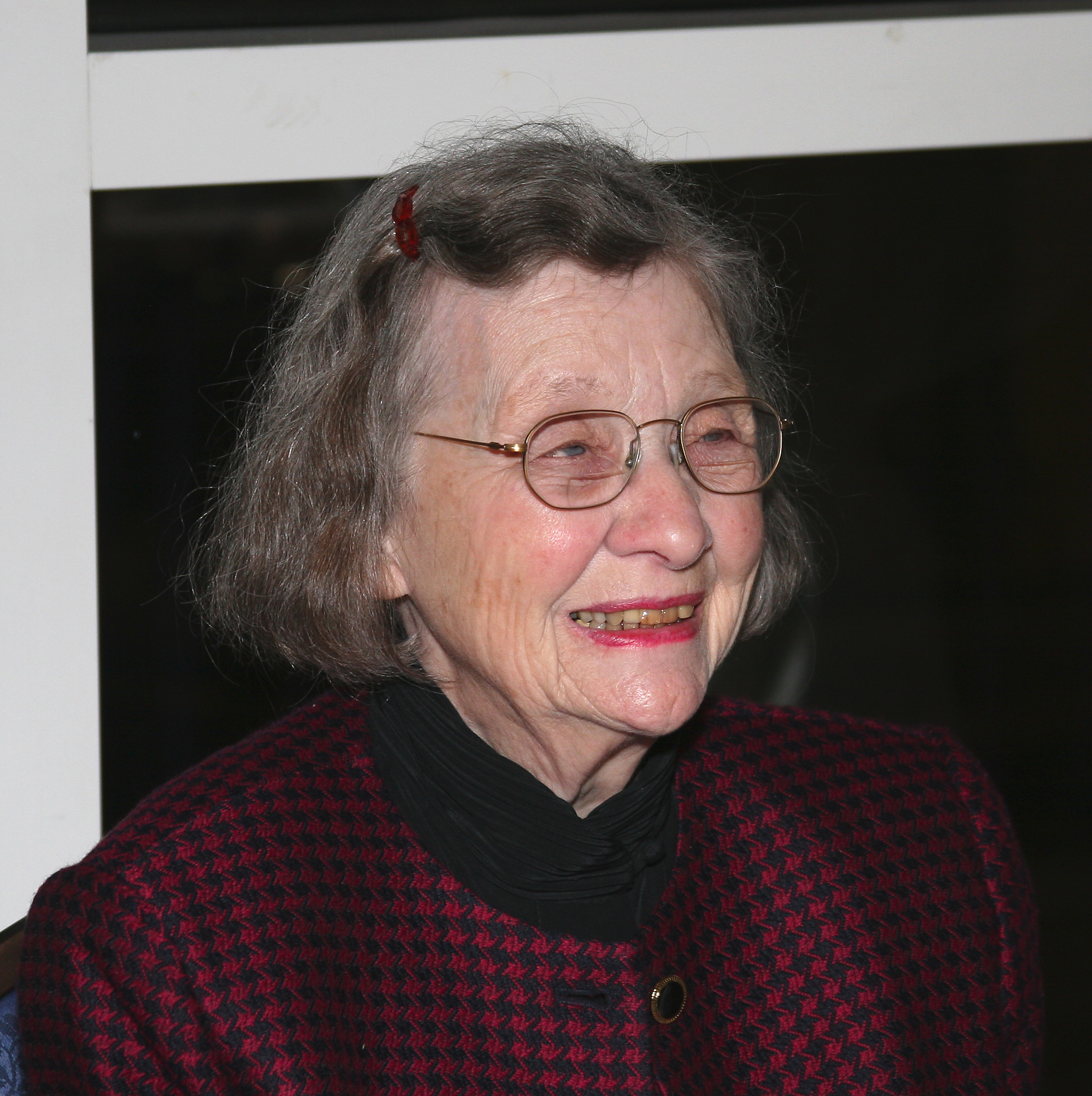
- Schwartz in 2007
- Born: 1925 or 1926
- Died: September 25, 2025 (aged 99)
- Education: University of California, Berkeley
- Known for: Co-founded Bio-Rad Laboratories
- Spouse: David Schwartz
- Children: 2, including Norman Schwartz

Alice Schwartz (1925 or 1926 – September 25, 2025) was an American businesswoman. According to Forbes, Schwartz had an estimated net worth of US$2.0 billion as of September 2025.

== Life and career ==
Schwartz graduated from the University of California, Berkeley with a degree in biochemistry. While at Berkeley, she met fellow student David Schwartz, whom she married, and in 1952, the couple founded the life sciences research company Bio-Rad Laboratories with their joint savings of $720. Schwartz was a researcher and director with the company and was on its board since its founding. After her husband died in 2012, Schwartz's son Norman became the company's chairman and CEO.

According to Forbes, in 2020 she was the oldest woman on the richest women in the U.S. list.

Schwartz died on September 25, 2025, at the age of 99.
