= Albert Schwartz =

Albert Schwartz may refer to:

- Albert Schwartz (swimmer) (1907–1986), American attorney and Olympic swimmer
- Albert Schwartz (zoologist) (1923–1992), American zoologist
- Al Schwartz (writer) (1910–1988), American screenwriter, television producer, and director

== See also ==
- Albert Schwarz (born 1934), Soviet and American mathematician and theoretical physicist
