= Candy Schwartz =

Canadian information scientist (born 1946)

Carolyn Susan "Candy" Schwartz, (born 1946) is an educator, author, and library information professional. Schwartz is a 1994 recipient of the ASIST Information Science Teacher Award.

== Early life and education ==
Carolyn Schwartz, known as Candy Schwartz in her publications and professional life, was born in Toronto, Canada, in 1946. She attended McGill University in Montreal, Canada, graduating with a Bachelor of Arts in linguistics in 1969 and a Master of Library Science in 1974. Schwartz was interested in pursuing her Ph.D. in information transfer after her TA experience in her master's, and attended Syracuse in the 1980s. Upon completing her degree, she accepted a position at Simmons University in Boston, Massachusetts, where she remained for the rest of her professional career, spanning over 30 years.

== Career ==
While she taught full-time at Simmons, Schwartz was also an author, researcher, mentor, and guest speaker. She taught workshops and lectured at a variety of universities, including McGill, Dalhousie, the University of Arizona, the Hong Kong Institute of Science and Technology, and several other universities in Thailand.

Schwartz has been recognized for her career in teaching and commitment to information science by multiple organizations, from the Association for Information Science and Technology, 1994, as Outstanding Information Science Teacher of the Year, and by Simmons College in 2016 with the Provost's Award for Student Centeredness in Graduate Teaching. She was also awarded a grant by the IMLS to fund a Ph.D. in library science management at Simmons for a "program [that] will train 15 well-qualified individuals to lead libraries and information organizations into the future, disseminate a body of scholarly and practice-based research to the profession, and continually update and examine leadership issues in information-related organizations." where Schwartz was the Coordinator of Doctoral Studies (2010).

Starting in 2005, and continuing for several years in her "Digital Libraries" course at Simmons, Schwartz led her students in how to record, process, and digitize scrapbooks, historical materials, and the college experiences of "Notable Women of Simmons College". The project is an effort to document Simmons College and Boston life at the beginning of the 20th century, including digitized ephemera from past students such as Marion Pearl Ayer, Ruth Mitchell Wunderly, and Catherine Hering Jensen.

Schwartz has held multiple offices and appointments in various professional organizations, including her term as President of the Association for Information Science and Technology in 1999. Candy Schwartz has also been a part of the Massachusetts Board of Library Commissioners, on the Task Force for Special Collections, 1995–1997. From 1988 to 1994, she was a part of the Documentation Abstracts, Inc., acting on the Board of Directors, then vice-president, 1990–91, and finally as their president, 1991–94. She was also on the Information Science Thesaurus Advisory Board, 1992–95.

Schwartz has published work in numerous articles, journals, and collaborative papers on the field and future of Library Science. Her books include: Records Management and the Library (1993), Sorting Out the Web: Approaches to Subject Access (2001), and Revisiting Outcomes Assessment in Higher Education (2006).

== Retirement ==
Schwartz retired at the end of 2017, and is Professor Emerita. Students from the 2019 graduating class can recall her teaching in their program.

== Awards and grants ==
- American Society for Information Science, Outstanding Information Science Teacher of the Year, 1994
- American Society for Information Science, New England Chapter, Distinguished Contribution in Information Science Award, 1998
- American Society for Information Science & Technology, Watson Davis Award, 2000
- Institute of Museum and Library Services, Laura Bush 21st Century Librarian Program, Ph.D. in managerial leadership in the information professions, 2005–2008. [$780,465, Co-PI]
- Simmons University, Provost's Award for Student Centeredness in Graduate Teaching, 2016

== Selected publications ==
- Schwartz, C., & Hernon, P. (1993). Records management and the library: issues and practices. Ablex Pub. Corp.
- Schwartz, C. (2001). Sorting out the Web: approaches to subject access. Ablex.
- Schwartz, C. (2000). Digital libraries: an overview. The Journal of Academic Librarianship, 26(6), 385–393. https://doi.org/10.1016/S0099-1333(00)00159-2
- Hernon, P., Dugan, R. E., & Schwartz, C. (2006). Revisiting outcomes assessment in higher education. Libraries Unlimited.
- Schwartz, C., Hernon, P. (2015). Exploring the library's contribution to the academic institution: Research agenda. Library & Information Science Research 37(2)
- Schwartz, C. (2017). Library and Information science research, then and now. Library & Information Science Research 39(1):61-6
