= Barry Schwartz =

Barry Schwartz may refer to:

- Barry Schwartz (psychologist) (born 1946), American psychologist
- Barry K. Schwartz (born 1942), American businessman, Thoroughbred racehorse owner, and former horse racing industry executive
- Barry Schwartz (sociologist) (1938–2021), American sociologist
