= Sophie Schwartz =

Swiss neuroscientist

- Born: December 21, 1965 (age 60)
- Education: University of Lausanne; University of Geneva
- Scientific career
- Workplaces: University of Geneva; Institute of Cognitive Neuroscience
- Thesis: Matière à rêver : exploration statistique et neuropsychologique des phénomènes oniriques au travers des textes et des images de rêve (1999)

Sophie Schwartz is a Swiss neuroscientist who is a professor at the University of Geneva. She studies the neural mechanisms that underpin experience-dependent changes in the human brain.

== Early life and education ==
Schwartz is from Switzerland. She was an undergraduate student at the University of Geneva, where she majored in biology. She moved to Lausanne as a graduate student, working toward a second bachelor's degree in psychology. She studied dreams through neurophysical investigations at the University of Lausanne. After completing her doctorate, Schwartz joined the Institute of Cognitive Neuroscience as a postdoctoral researcher.

== Career ==
Schwartz joined the faculty at the University of Geneva and was eventually promoted to the executive committee of the Brain and Behaviour Laboratory and Head of the Laboratory for Neuroimaging of Sleep and Cognition. She investigates the fundamental mechanisms that determine experience-dependent changes in the brain. She is interested in models of learning and neural plasticity and their offline replay. To better understand these phenomena, Schwartz has created novel behavioural tasks, which she combines with brain imaging techniques such as functional magnetic resonance imaging and high-density electroencephalography. Using EEG, Schwartz has proposed that dreams serve to simulate frightening situations to better prepare for real life dangers.

Schwartz has studied brain activity during sleep, and showed that the brain processes information during deep sleep, evaluating information and retaining the most crucial concepts. The mechanisms that underpin this memory consolidation are signals sent between the hippocampus, which stores temporary information, and other parts of the brain.

== Selected publications ==
- Juliana V Baldo; Sophie Schwartz; David P. Wilkins; Nina F Dronkers (1 November 2006). "Role of frontal versus temporal cortex in verbal fluency as revealed by voxel-based lesion symptom mapping". Journal of the International Neuropsychological Society. 12 (6): 896–900. doi:10.1017/s1355617706061078. ISSN 1355-6177. PMID 17064451. Wikidata Q34576572.
- Didier Grandjean; David Sander; Gilles Pourtois; Sophie Schwartz; Mohamed L. Seghier; Klaus R Scherer; Patrik Vuilleumier (23 January 2005). "The voices of wrath: brain responses to angry prosody in meaningless speech". Nature Neuroscience. 8 (2): 145–146. doi:10.1038/nn1392. ISSN 1097-6256. PMID 15665880. Wikidata Q49121425.
- P Vuilleumier; C Chicherio; F Assal; S Schwartz; D Slosman; T Landis (1 June 2001). "Functional neuroanatomical correlates of hysterical sensorimotor loss". Brain. 124 (Pt 6): 1077–1090. doi:10.1093/brain/124.6.1077. ISSN 0006-8950. PMID 11353724. Wikidata Q48880242.
