= Bill Schwartz =

Bill Schwartz may refer to:

- Bill Schwartz (catcher) (1864–1940), 19th century baseball catcher
- Bill Schwartz (first baseman) (1884–1961), 20th century baseball first baseman
