= Marie Schwartz =

Marie Schwartz may refer to:

- Marie-Hélène Schwartz (1913–2013), French mathematician
- Marie Sophie Schwartz (1819–1894), Swedish novelist
- Elpis Melena, penname of Anglo-German novelist Marie Espérance von Schwartz (1818–1899)
