= Aaron Schwartz =

Aaron Schwartz may refer to:

- Aaron Schwartz (American actor) (born 1981), known for Heavyweights and The Mighty Ducks
- Aaron Schwartz (Canadian actor) (born 1948/1949), known for The Outside Chance of Maximilian Glick
- A. R. Schwartz (Aaron Robert Schwartz, 1926–2018), Texas politician

== See also ==
- Aaron Swartz (1986–2013), American Internet activist
- Aaron Swartz (actor), British actor and director known for I Shouldn't be Alive
- Aaron Schwarz, American architect
