= Martin A. Schwartz =

American cell biologist and professor

Martin A. Schwartz is an American cell biologist, biomedical engineer, and cardiovascular researcher. He is the Robert W. Berliner Professor of Medicine (Cardiology) and Professor of Biomedical Engineering and Cell Biology at Yale University. His research focuses on cell adhesion, integrin signaling, mechanotransduction, and vascular biology, particularly the ways in which mechanical forces and extracellular matrix interactions influence cellular behavior and contribute to cardiovascular disease.

== Education ==
Schwartz earned a bachelor's degree in chemistry from New College of Florida and a Ph.D. in physical chemistry from Stanford University. He then did postdoctoral research in biology at the Massachusetts Institute of Technology (MIT) in the laboratory of Richard Hynes.

== Academic career ==
Schwartz has served on the faculties of Harvard Medical School, Scripps Research Institute, and University of Virginia. He joined Yale in 2011 Throughout his career, Schwartz has made contributions to the understanding of integrin mediated signaling pathways and endothelial cell responses to mechanical forces such as blood flow. His work has advanced knowledge of atherosclerosis, vascular remodeling, and the molecular mechanisms underlying cardiovascular disease.

Key findings include the identification of the endothelial cell mechanosensory junctional complex consisting of PECAM, VE-cadherin, and VEGFR2/3,, the discovery that integrins are signalling receptors and not merely adhesion molecules, the invention of the fluorescent tension sensor for measuring forces across proteins in living cells or organisms, demonstration that vascular endothelial cells encode a fluid shear stress set point that govern artery remodeling to set vessel diameter, and identification of protocadherin gamma A9 as a key molecule that promotes vascular inflammation and potential therapeutic target in atherosclerosis.

As of 2026, he serves as principal investigator of the Schwartz Laboratory at Yale.

== Influence ==
Schwartz is well known for his essay "The importance of stupidity in scientific research" which has been viewed 1.4 million times and downloaded more than 248,000 times as of 2026.
