= Daniel Schwartz (disambiguation) =

Dan, Daniel or Danny may refer to:

- Dan Schwartz (born 1950), American politician
- Daniel Schwartz, American businessman
- Danny Schwartz, a police detective in the film Heat portrayed by Jerry Trimble
