= Glenn Schwartz (disambiguation) =

Glenn Schwartz (1940–2018) was an American musician, member of the band Pacific Gas & Electric.

Glenn Schwartz may also refer to:

- Glenn Schwartz (meteorologist) (born 1951), American author and meteorologist
- Glenn M. Schwartz, American archaeologist
