= Tony Schwartz =

Tony Schwartz may refer to:

- Tony Schwartz (sound archivist) (1923–2008), American sound designer, media theorist and advertising creator
- Tony Schwartz (writer) (born 1952), American writer, speaker, and businessman
- Anthony Schwartz (born 2000), American sprinter and American football player
