= Adrian Schwartz =

Israeli backgammon player and convicted rapist

Adrian Ben Herman Schwartz
- אדריאן בן הרמן שוורץ
- Born: 1948 (age 77–78); Craiova, Romania
- Status: Released from prison, under house arrest
- Occupation: Former backgammon champion
- Convictions: Sexual offences, rape
- Criminal charges: Rape, indecent assault
- Penalty: 25 years imprisonment, later reduced to 20 years

Adrian Ben Herman Schwartz (Hebrew: אדריאן בן הרמן שוורץ; born 1948) is an Israeli former backgammon champion and convicted serial rapist. He was the first person to be put on retrial following the result of a DNA test, which again resulted in a conviction by the Supreme Court of Israel.

== Biography ==
Born in Romania in 1948, Schwartz was first convicted of sexual offences in 1969, receiving a 14-year prison term, but served only nine years before he was released in 1978. Not long after, he became an active member of several chess clubs and participated in backgammon competitions, quickly achieving the rank of champion in the former, and was a senior candidate for a chessmaster.

In the early 1990s, Schwartz was rearrested after he was accused of several rapes, of which he would be convicted of only one and sentenced to 20 years imprisonment. Through his trial, he professed his innocence and claimed that this was only because of his previous convictions. Since his conviction, Schwartz has worked from prison to prove his innocence in a long series of motions and appeals, as well as initiating legal proceedings, one of which resulted in a retrial. Although he is a convicted sex offender with problematic behavior, it was deduced that law enforcement agencies had conducted suspiciously in his case, raising doubts from judges and public figures.

Among his supporters are Prof. Kenneth Mann, the founder and first Chief Public Defender of Israel's Public Defense, and Prof. Mordechai Kremnitzer, a criminal expert who teaches law at the Hebrew University of Jerusalem.

== Court proceedings ==
In February 1991, Schwartz was charged in the Tel Aviv District Court with seven counts of rape and indecent assaults on children, although authorities suspected the true number was double that amount. The main evidence was based on identifications from a police lineup. The panel of judges, headed by Justice Amnon Straschnov, acquitted him in five of these cases, after it was determined that there were errors in the identification, and they couldn't be used as evidence. In the remaining two cases, he was convicted and sentenced to 25 years imprisonment.

In 1995, after an appeal to the Supreme Court, he was acquitted of another rape case, after it was determined it was wrongful too. The sole remaining case had occurred in Jerusalem, while the others were in the Central District. According to the verdict, Schwartz preyed upon an 11-year-old girl returning home from a public library, and on various pretexts, lured her to a dark shelter, where he raped her while threatening her with a knife. The girl later recognized Schwartz from photos presented to her, and also identified his wallet. This identification and additional circumstantial evidence provided by the prosecution led to his conviction. Among other things, he refused to give blood and semen samples, rationalizing that the investigating authorities would skew the findings to worsen his condition. In this case, the conviction remained unchanged, but his sentence was reduced to 20 years imprisonment. Schwartz's request for another hearing on his appeal was denied.

In 1997, the Supreme Court reviewed his request for an appeal which, according to him, had the power to point out his innocence, but was withheld by the Criminal Department. In the end, the request was denied.

In 2002, Schwartz petitioned the Tel Aviv District Court to be released on parole, to seek medical attention to reduce his risky behavior, but it was denied.

== DNA testing ==
In 1996, Prof. Mann was informed that the possibility of comparing blood samples would exonerate the convict. He persuaded Adrian to agree to provide blood samples, and appealed to the Supreme Court to order an examination whose results could lead to Schwartz's acquittal. The court denied the request, but instead allowed a DNA exam to link some semen found at the crime and compare it. Schwartz initially refused the test, arguing that police would compromise the results, but three years later, when he agreed, the prosecution refused on the grounds that the matter had been exhausted on all instances, and the Supreme Court was required to rule.

In June 2001, Justice Mishael Cheshin ruled that Schwartz's request should be denied, but due to the state's consent, an examination would be conducted by the Abu Kabir Forensic Institute.

The findings of the initial tests were inconclusive, and the Supreme Court ruled for supplementary tests. In 2004, after they were completed, Dr. Maya Freund concluded that the girl's genetic profile and that of an unidentified male couldn't be positively linked to Adrian Schwartz. During the hearings, she retracted her previous statements, saying that there had been a technical error, correcting that, based on the results, "it cannot be ruled out that this is Schwartz's DNA". At the hearings, another new piece of evidence was presented which, ostensibly, cast doubt on the conviction.

In September 2005, and after two more crucial witnesses were brought on Schwartz's behalf, Justice Edmond Levy ruled that "the existence of a retrial in the applicant's case is warranted by the new evidence before the court, which, if accepted as credible, may change the outcome in his favor."

In 2005, the new trial began in the Tel Aviv District Court, and after four years, in June 2009, he was convicted a second time. Schwartz appealed to the Supreme Court over his conviction, but it was denied, as well as his request for another hearing. In early September 2010, he was released from prison. The Tel Aviv District Court ruled that he should remain under house arrest and is prohibited from approaching any areas frequented by minors. In January 2019, Schwartz again filed a motion for a retrial, which was denied.

== Supreme Court outcomes ==
- TF (Tel Aviv District) 170/91 State of Israel v. Adrian Schwartz, given January 27, 1992. P.M. 5752, Part Two, p. 265
- According to the 1301/92 State of Israel v Adrian Schwartz, on January 27, 1997. PD Volume v, Section V, pp 749–787
- AD 844/97 Adrian Schwartz v. State of Israel, given July 8, 1997
- HCJ 6861/96 Adrian Schwartz v. State of Israel
- AAA (Tel Aviv District) 2661/02 Adrian Ben Herman Schwartz v. Prison Service, granted February 19, 2003.
- HCJ 1781/00 Adrian Schwartz v. State of Israel, opened March 6, 2000
- HCJ 1781/00 Adrian Schwartz v. State of Israel, granted on June 4, 2001
- 9974/04 Adrian Schwartz v. State of Israel, given September 5, 2005
- CrimC (provincial TA) 1154/05 State of Israel v Adrian Ben Herman Schwartz, to June 15, 2009
- According to 5459/09 Adrian Schwartz v State of Israel, to July 20, 2015
- DNP 5306/15 Adrian Schwartz v. State of Israel, given September 6, 2015
- MH 390/19 Adrian Schwartz v. State of Israel, given on December 31, 2019
