= Howard Kottler =

American ceramist, conceptual artist, and professor(1930–1989)

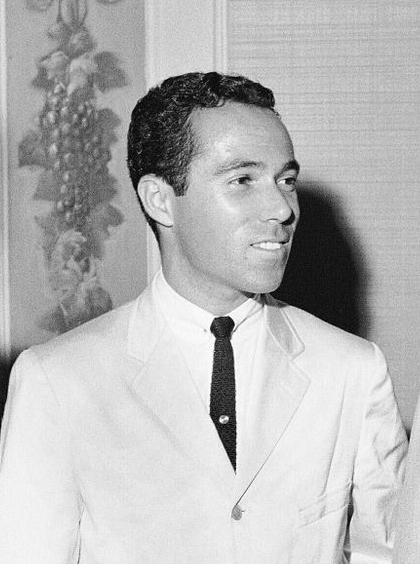
- 1957
- Born: Howard William Kottler; March 5, 1930; Cleveland, Ohio, United States
- Died: January 21, 1989 (aged 58); Seattle, Washington, United States
- Education: Ohio State University (BA, 1952; MA, 1956; PhD, 1964); Cranbrook Academy of Art (MFA, 1957)
- Known for: Ceramics
- Notable work: American Supperware; America Gothicware; Blue Balls
- Movement: Funk art, pop art

Howard William Kottler (March 5, 1930 – January 21, 1989) was an American ceramist, conceptual artist, and professor of ceramics at the University of Washington, credited as a seminal force in redefining the direction of contemporary American ceramic art.

Influenced by the Bay Area funk art movement, he is best known for his multiple series of decal plates that rejected traditional studio ceramic practices that emphasized and valued hand-made objects, and focusing instead on mass-produced store-bought plates and commercial decals to create pieces decorated with appropriated images from popular culture to convey Kottler's political, social, and personal messages. Based on these works, he developed a reputation for using coded images, wordplay, and biting humor which established Kottler's reputation as a satirist and decalomaniac.

== Career ==
Originally trained as an optometrist, Kottler graduated from Ohio State University in 1952 with a Bachelor of Arts in Biological Sciences. While working on his undergrad, he took a university ceramics course in 1952 that shifted his focus and returned to Ohio State to study ceramics. Kottler began his career with a traditional crafts orientation; as a student, he had been trained in traditional ceramic techniques and glaze technology. After earning a Master of Arts in Ceramics from Ohio State in 1956, he was offered a scholarship to undertake a Master of Fine Arts at the Cranbrook Academy of Art. It was there that he met and studied under Maija Grotell, a teacher and artist who profoundly influenced his ideas about art and education. With support of a Fulbright grant, he spent time working at the Central School of Arts and Crafts and at the Arabia Ceramic Factory in Finland, studying the creation and application of ceramic decals and working with renowned potter Kyllikki Salmenhaara. He returned to Ohio State, where he received a Ph.D. in Ceramics in 1964 with his dissertation An Exhibition of Pottery in Support of Three Processes in Ceramics, and later moved to Seattle where he joined the University of Washington faculty in 1965.

== Work & Collections ==
Not fully appreciated while alive, he has, posthumously, received critical acclaim in response to a number of retrospective exhibitions held in the United States. The output of his work was uneven over the 30 years of his professional life as he was a full-time university professor, it was only in the 80s that he began to work with sufficient intensity to produce a body of work sufficient to result in a one-person show.

His works have been collected by New York's Metropolitan Museum of Art, the Museum of Art and Design, and Whitney Museum of American Art; the Renwick Gallery, Smithsonian American Art Museum in Washington, D.C.; Los Angeles County Museum of Art; the National Museum of Modern Art in Kyoto; the Victoria and Albert Museum in London; and Seattle Art Museum, Portland Art Museum, Henry Art Gallery, and Tacoma Art Museum in the Pacific Northwest.

Two Spout Branch Pot, 1957
glazed earthenware

American Gothic: Playmate Conditioner, 1972
commercial porcelain and decal with silver luster glaze

Waiting for Master, 1986
earthenware, paint, simulated gold leaf, and applied decals
