= Eric Schwartz =

Eric Schwartz may refer to:

- Eric Schwartz (comedian), American comedian, musician and actor
- Eric Schwartz (songwriter), American singer/songwriter and musical satirist
- Eric L. Schwartz (1947–2018), American neuroscientist
- Eric P. Schwartz, former United States Assistant Secretary of State for Population, Refugees, and Migration
- Eric W. Schwartz, artist and creator of the 1996 webcomic Sabrina Online
- Erica Schwartz, Minnesota State Representative
