= Jacob Schwartz (librarian) =

Librarian, Apprentices' library of New York

- Born: March 13, 1846; New York City
- Died: March 26, 1926 (aged 80); Greenwich
- Occupation: Librarian
- Employer: General Society of Mechanics and Tradesmen of the City of New York (1863–)

Jacob Schwartz (born March 13, 1846, in New York City) was an American librarian.

In 1863, Schwartz entered the Apprentices' library of New York, of which he became chief librarian in 1871. He introduced his system of classification at the library; this has since been adopted wholly or in part by various librarians. The system is a combination of the three fundamental subsystems — classified, alphabetical, and numerical. Methods of management that were followed there were also devised by him.

Schwartz contributed to the Library Journal and other periodicals.
