= Frederick Schwarz =

Fred, Frederic, Frederick, Friedrich, or Fritz Schwarz, Schwartz, Shwarz, or Shwartz could refer to:

- Frederick August Otto Schwarz (1836–1911), German-born American toy retailer
  - FAO Schwarz, company founded by Frederick August Otto Schwarz
- Frederick A.O. Schwarz Jr. (born 1935), American attorney and great-grandson of Frederick August Otto Schwarz
- Frederik Schwarz (1753–1838), Danish actor
- Fred Schwarz (1913–2009), Australian physician and political activist
- Friedrich Schwarz (1880–?), German fencer
- Fritz Schwarz (1899–?), German bobsledder
- Fritz Schwarz-Waldegg (born Friedrich Schwarz, 1889–1942), Austrian painter
- Frederic Schwartz (1951–2014), American architect and city planner
