= Peter Schwartz =

Peter Schwartz(e) or Schwarz may refer to:

- Peter Nigri (1434–1480s), 15th century Thomist from Kaaden
- Peter Schwartz (Capitol rioter), convicted felon who participated in the January 6 United States Capitol attack
- Peter Schwartz (writer) (born 1949), writer and journalist
- Peter Schwartz (futurist) (born 1946), futurist and co-founder of GBN
- Peter Schwartze (born 1931), German scientist
- Peter Schwarz (born 1953), German football (soccer) player
- Peter Carl Ludwig Schwarz (1822–1894), astronomer
- Peter Schwarz, Australian rules footballer who played in the 1994 SANFL Grand Final
