= John Schwartz (disambiguation) =

John Schwartz may refer to:

- John Schwartz (1793-1860), United States congressman
- John Burnham Schwartz (born 1965), American novelist
- John William Schwartz (1755-after 1802), Nova Scotia politician

== See also ==
- John Swartz (1858-1930), American photographer
- John Schwarz (disambiguation)
- Jonathan Schwartz (disambiguation)
