= Janet Mielke Schwartz =

American behavioral scientist

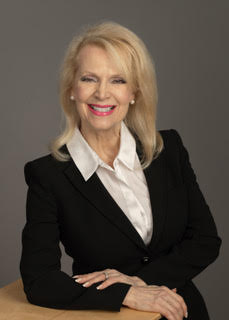
- Born: November 8, 1952 (age 73)
- Citizenship: American
- Education: Ph.D., University of Pittsburgh
- Alma mater: University of Pittsburgh
- Occupation: Behavioral scientist
- Political party: Democrat Party
- Website: janschwartz.us

Janet Mielke Schwartz is an American behavioral scientist who is also a fellow of American Psychological Association. She is known for her criminal investigations for government agencies, including the FBI, the National Science Foundation, the Defense Intelligence Agency, CIA, and IRS. She is also a Fellow of the American Academy of Forensic Sciences.

Her work relates to the application of behavioral science in federal investigations, encompassing the analysis of human behavior, decision-making, and organizational dynamics within investigative contexts.

== Biography ==
She was trained in behavioral science at the University of Pittsburgh, completing her doctoral studies in the late twentieth century. She completed her PhD. In 1987 from the University of Pittsburgh.

Her early career focused on educational and family psychology; she later worked in forensic and applied research environments, involving behavioral science in law enforcement and investigative contexts.

Her forensic work officially began in 1992 when Joseph L. Alioto Sr., former mayor of San Francisco, retained her services regarding an economic crime investigation and an anti-trust lawsuit against a non-profit hospital located in northeast Ohio. The work included analysis of organizational and individual behavior in relation to economic and legal issues.

Schwartz has also authored publications, including the Psychological Profile of a Spy and Overcoming Resistance on the Local Level.

She is the author of Psychological Profile of a Spy, a publication that discusses behavioral and cognitive characteristics associated with espionage and covert activity, and Overcoming Resistance on the Local Level, which addresses organizational responses to change and institutional resistance. She contributed a chapter titled "Espionage and Psychology" to an edited volume on intelligence studies, which examines psychological frameworks related to covert behavior and operational decision-making.

She was awarded University Scholar award, by the University of Pittsburgh.
