= Judith S. Schwartz =

American scholar of ceramics art

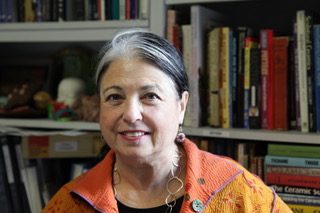
- Born: Judith Elaine Stockheim; July 10, 1942 (age 84); Middle Village, Queens, NY
- Occupations: Educator, curator, scholar
- Notable work: Confrontational Ceramics
- Spouse: Martin Frederick Schwartz
- Relatives: Stevanne Auerbach (Sister)

Judith S. Schwartz is an American educator, curator, author, maker, and scholar of contemporary ceramics. She is professor emeritus in the Department of Art and Art Professions at New York University, where she taught ceramic sculpture from 1970 to 2017 and served in administrative roles. She is known for her work on the use of clay as a medium for social commentary, through her book Confrontational Ceramics.

== Biography ==
Judith Elaine Stockheim Schwartz was born on was born on July 10, 1942, in Middle Village, Queens, New York and was the second of two daughters. Her father, Nathan Carl Stockheim, was born in 1909, was a native New Yorker, and earned a master's degree from New York University in math education. During the depression he found work as a New York firefighter.

Judith's mother, Jeane Sydney Rosen, was born in Baltimore, Maryland in 1913 and she was a captain in the army corps nurse reserve and was called to action in Korea in 1951. Judith's sister, Stevanne Auerbach, was a toyologist and was known professionally as Dr. Toy.

=== Art career ===
She was a painting major at Queens College studying with John Ferren, but set out to Ohio State University for summer classes to study and had met Howard Kottler, who was a doctoral candidate in Ceramics and who altered her career direction. She stayed for two years studying with the ceramic faculty each with their specialties such as in Glaze Chemistry, Wheel throwing, and Aesthetics. When she returned to Queens College, she graduated with an exhibition at the Paul Klapper Library gallery of her ceramic art and soon launched her own studio/ store in Manhattan.

She taught Industrial Art Ceramics at JHS 13 in Spanish Harlem and later became the educational spokesperson/artist for Lenox China, 1977–1983, touring the USA lecturing and demonstrating Lenox's special porcelain slip casting techniques.

Schwartz joined the NYU faculty in 1970 and was named Professor in the Department of Art and Art Professions, where she directed the Sculpture in Craft Media area, overseeing programs in clay, metal, glass, and fiber. At New York University, she held administrative positions, including Director of Doctoral Studies from 2004 to 2007, Director of Undergraduate Studies and Recruitment from 1991 to 1997, and Director of Student Teaching from 1983 to 1986.

She also served as an associate professor and art advisor in the University Without Walls program at NYU's Gallatin School. In addition, she co-founded S.I.T.E. Inc. (Sculpture in the Environment), an initiative dedicated to public art and environmental sculpture, where she also served as academic director. She was named professor emeritus in 2017.

Schwartz is the founder and current President of the virtual Museum of Ceramic Art (MOCA/NY.org ), which hosts online exhibitions and resources for ceramic art.

She developed and researched the Ceramic World Destinations map which highlights the global ceramic community of museums, galleries, studios, and residencies to demonstrate the diversity, appreciation, and scholarship of ceramic art in all its myriad forms. She was Vice President of the International Academy of Ceramics, a UNESCO-affiliated organization based in Geneva, and has served as a consultant to the World Organization Ceramic Education Foundation (WOCEF) in Korea.

She was President of the Watershed Center for the Ceramic Arts and has served on the boards of organizations, including Studio Potter, the Clay Art Center, Arts Westchester and the International Museum of Dinnerware Design. She is also a trustee of the Howard Kottler Estate, helping to preserve the work of the American ceramic artist Howard Kottler.

== Research and exhibitions ==
Schwartz's research focuses on ceramic sculpture that engages with themes of social and political critique. Her work examines how artists utilize clay to address themes such as alienation, cultural conflict, and identity. This area of inquiry culminated in her 2008 book, Confrontational Ceramics, which surveys international artists who use ceramics for social commentary.

Her curatorial work includes the exhibitions Confrontational Clay (2009–2012) which toured 10 USA locations and InCiteful Ceramics (2014–2016), both of which were supported by Exhibits USA and accompanied by catalog publications.

Other curatorial efforts include New York, New York, which toured Norway, 1995, HATitude: The Milliner in Culture and Couture Exhibition ( 2014) for Arts Westchester, and True and Real, at the Utah Museum of Contemporary Art, Salt Lake City(2025).

She has focused on the American ceramic sculpture movement, particularly its intersection with social activism. Schwartz has also worked on strategies to revitalize three-dimensional art education in K–12 settings, organizing symposia such as The Case for Clay in Secondary Art Education. Additionally, she has been involved in integrating technology into craft education, including the use of digital embroidery and computer-aided design. Her historical research includes a study of Noritake Art Deco porcelain from 1923 to 1932, for which she completed photography and a manuscript.

== Personal life ==
Schwartz married Martin Frederick Schwartz on September 18, 1960, a PhD from Ohio State University 1962, with a focus on speech science. He was director of the National Center for Stuttering in New York City from 1976 until 2012 and during that time authored several books on stuttering.

== Selected bibliography ==
- Schwartz, Judith S. (2008). Confrontational ceramics: the artist as social critic. London : Philadelphia: A & C Black ; University of Pennsylvania Press. ISBN 978-0-8122-4139-6.
- Schwartz, Judith S. (2000). Confrontational clay: the artist as social critic: an exhibition organized and toured by ExhibitsUSA. Kansas City: Mid-America Arts Alliance. ISBN 978-1-882603-06-0.
- Schwartz, Judith S. (January 1, 2007). The Art of Rejection by Arthur Gonzalez. John Natsoulas Press. ISBN 9781881572763.
- Schwartz, Judith S. (2010). "Transplanted and Transformed New Directions in the Journeys of Akio Takamori and Sergei Isupov". Ceramics: Art and Perception. 82: 38–58.

== Awards ==
- JD Rockefeller III Grant in Art Education
- Excellence in Teaching Award, National Council on Education for the Ceramic Arts (NCECA)
- Everson Museum Award for Service and Excellence in Ceramic Education
- Fulbright Senior Specialist Grant, National College of Art and Design, Dublin
- Educator of the Year, Renwick Gallery, Smithsonian Institution
