= Lawrence Richardson Jossenberger =

Vaudeville comedian

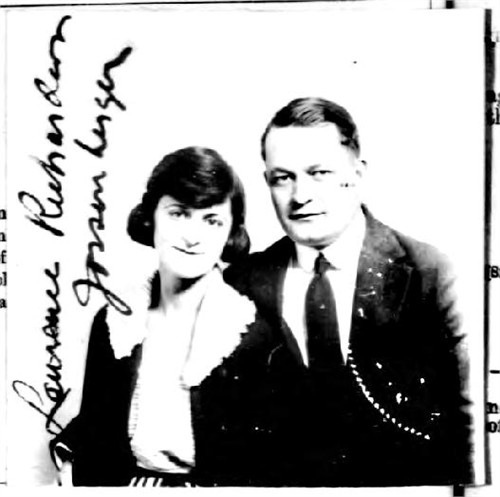

Lawrence Richardson Jossenberger (May 31, 1894 – August 4, 1935) who worked under the stage name Larry Rich, was a vaudeville comedian.

== Biography ==
He was born in Fort Worth, Texas, on May 31, 1894, to Victor Jossenberger and Helen Samantha Richardson. He died on August 4, 1935, in Jamaica, Queens, New York. He was buried in Kensico Cemetery.
