= Kensico Cemetery =

Cemetery in New York, United States

Coordinates: 41.0779°N 73.7865°W

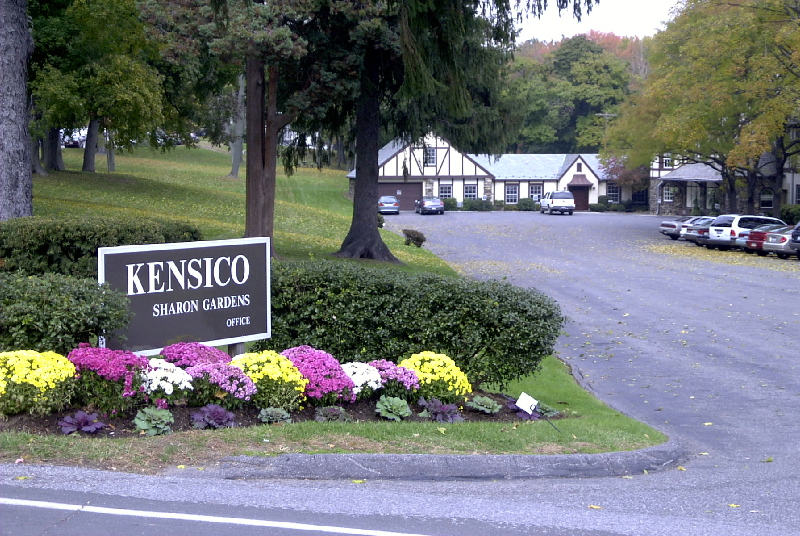
Main entrance

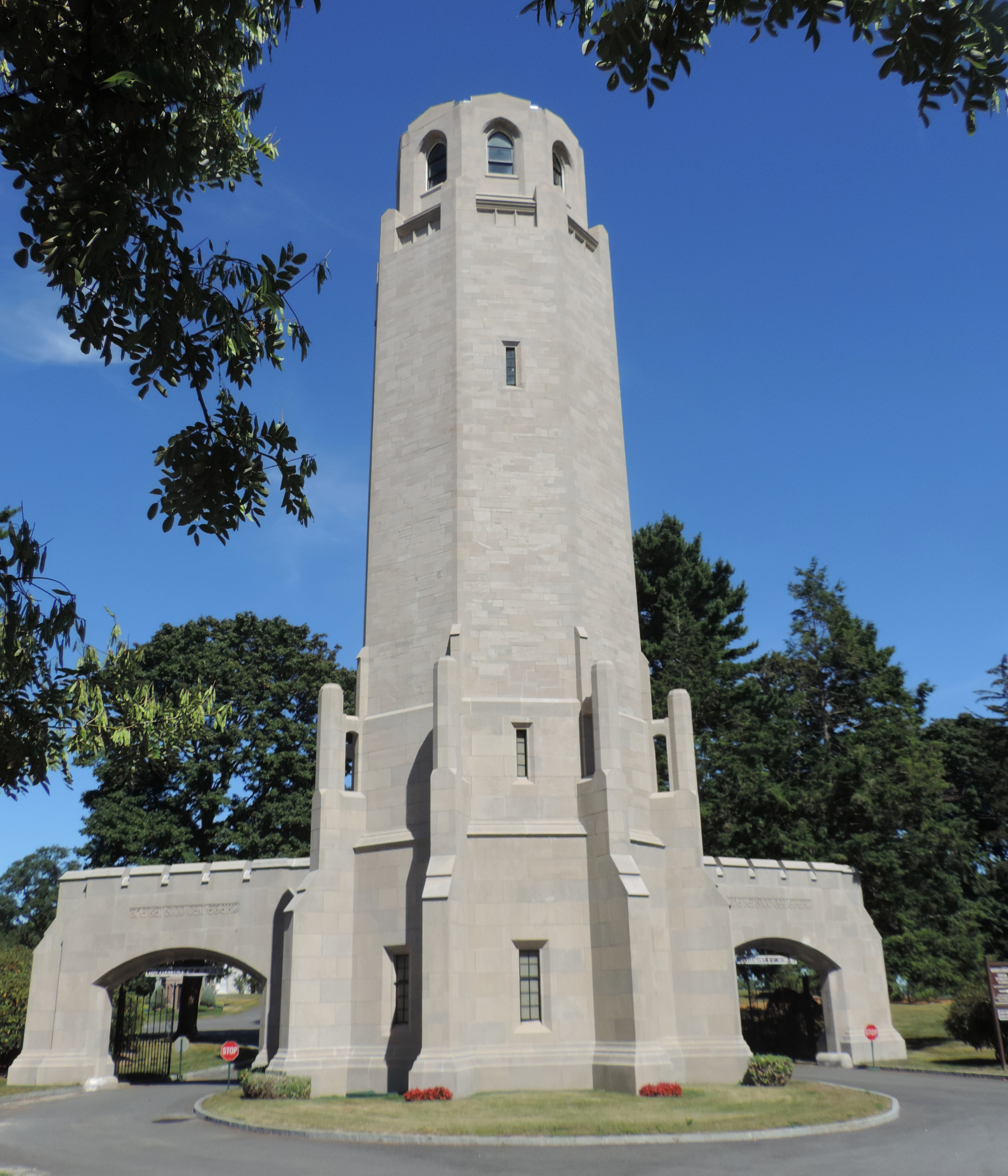
The Tower at the upper entrance

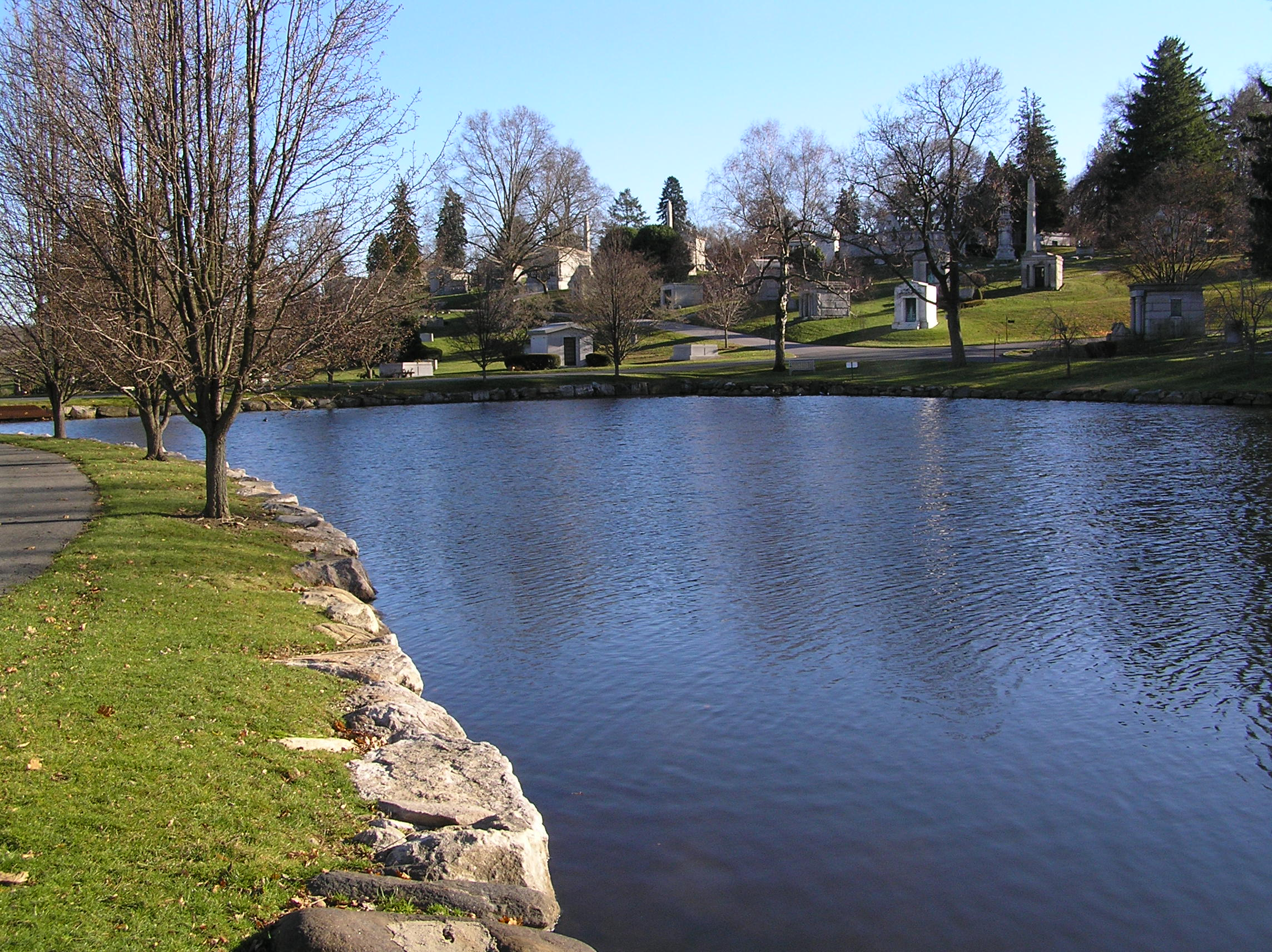
Mineola Lake

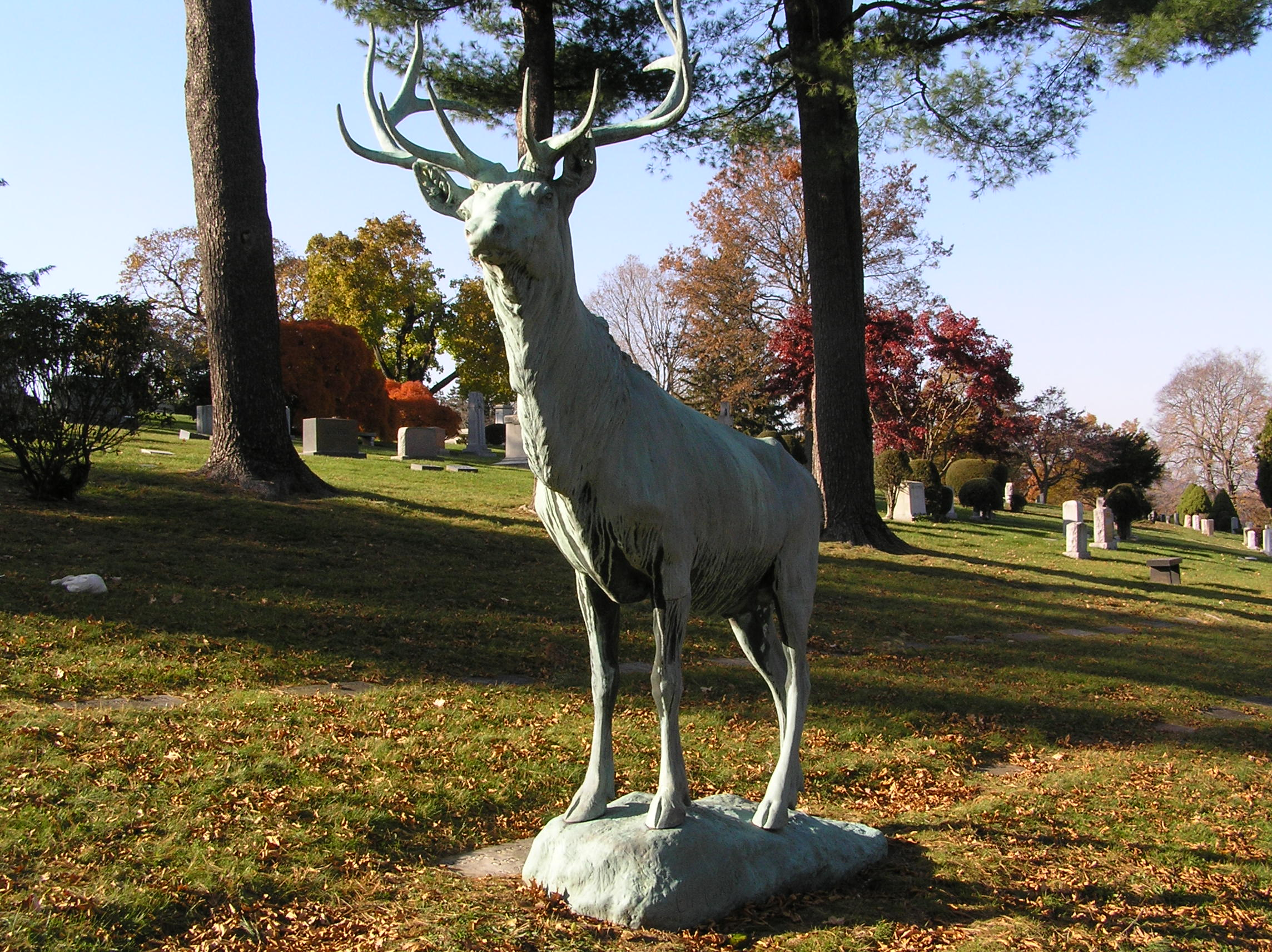
An elk statue

Kensico Cemetery is a cemetery in Valhalla, New York, United States. It was founded in 1889, when many New York City cemeteries were becoming full and rural cemeteries were being created near the railroads that served the city. Initially 250 acres (101.2 ha), it was expanded to 600 acres (240 ha) in 1905, but reduced to 461 acres (187 ha) in 1912, when a portion was sold to the neighboring Gate of Heaven Cemetery.

Many entertainment figures of the early twentieth century, including Russian-born Sergei Rachmaninoff, were buried here. The cemetery has a special section for members of the Actors' Fund of America and the National Vaudeville Association, some of whom died in abject poverty.

The cemetery contains four Commonwealth war graves, of three Canadian Army soldiers of World War I and a repatriated American Royal Air Force airman of World War II.

As of December 2021, eight Major League Baseball players are buried here, including Baseball Hall of Fame inductee Lou Gehrig.

Sharon Gardens is a 76-acre (31 ha) section of Kensico Cemetery, which was created in 1953 for Jewish burials.

== Notable interments in Kensico division ==
- Virginia Admiral (1915–2000), painter and poet, mother of actor Robert De Niro
- Hadji Ali (c. 1887-92 – 1937), vaudeville performance artist
- Elizabeth Akers Allen (1832–1911), author and poet
- Glenn Anders (1889–1981), American actor
- Edward Franklin Albee II (1857–1930), Vaudeville impresario
- John Emory Andrus (1841–1934), mayor of Yonkers, New York, and U.S. Congressman
- Peter Arno (1904–1968), cartoonist
- Anne Bancroft (1931–2005), American actress
- Wendy Barrie (1912–1978), actress
- Ed Barrow (1868–1953), baseball manager and executive
- Marion Bauer (1882–1955), American composer
- Malcolm Lee Beggs (1907–1956) actor
- Henri Bendel (1868–1936), fashion designer, creator of the Bendel bonnet
- Theodore Bendix (1862–1935), composer and musical director
- Vivian Blaine (1921–1995), actress and singer
- William Blaisdell (1865–1931), actor (plot: Actors' Fund)
- Ralph Albert Blakelock (1847–1919), Romanticist painter
- Patras Bokhari (1898–1958), Pakistani humorist writer
- Paul Bonwit (1862–1939), founder of Bonwit Teller department store
- Evangeline Booth (1865–1950), evangelist, daughter of Salvation Army founder, fourth General of the Salvation Army
- Herbert Booth (1862–1926), songwriter, son of Salvation Army founder
- Sully Boyar (Irvin) (1923–2001), actor
- Martin Bregman (1926–2018), film producer
- Samuel Logan Brengle (1860-1936), author, Salvation Army Commissioner
- Russ Brown (1892–1964), actor
- Billie Burke (1884–1970), American actress, wife of Florenz Ziegfeld
- Henry Burr (1882–1941), Canadian singer
- William J. Butler (1860–1927), Irish silent film actor
- Cheng Chui Ping (1949–2014), 'Snakehead', human smuggler
- Andy Coakley (1882–1963), baseball player
- Frank Conroy (1890–1964), British film and stage actor
- Bigelow Cooper (1867–1953) actor
- Harry Cooper (1904–2000), golfer
- Frederick E. Crane (1869–1947), Chief Judge of the NY Court of Appeals
- Leroy Bowers Crane (1849–1916), member of the New York State Assembly
- Cheryl Crawford (1902–1986), theatrical producer
- Milton Cross (1897–1975), radio host and announcer
- Edward W. Curley (1873–1940), U.S. Congressman
- George Ticknor Curtis (1812–1894), author, writer, historian and lawyer
- Harry Davenport (1866–1949), actor
- Clive Davis (1932-2026), Record Producer and Executive
- Olive Deering (1918–1986), actress
- William Wallace Denslow (1856–1915), illustrator
- Robert De Niro Sr. (1922–1993), artist, father of actor Robert De Niro
- Peter DeRose (1900–1953), Hall of Fame composer
- Elliott Dexter (1870–1941), film and stage actor
- Lew Dockstader (1856–1924), vaudeville comedian.
- Luigi Palma di Cesnola (1832–1904) Civil War Congressional Medal of Honor recipient
- Arthur Donaldson (1869–1955), stage and screen actor
- Tommy Dorsey (1905–1956), swing-era trombonist and bandleader
- J. Gordon Edwards (1867–1925), silent-film director
- Sherman Edwards (1919–1981), Tony Award-winning composer and songwriter
- Angna Enters (1897–1989), entertainer
- Judith Evelyn (1909–1967), stage actress
- Geraldine Farrar (1882–1967), operatic soprano
- Sid Farrar (1859–1935), Major League baseball player, father of soprano Geraldine Farrar
- Emanuel Feuermann (1902–1942), master cellist
- Sylvia Fine (1913–1991) lyricist, composer and producer, and the wife of the comedian Danny Kaye
- Ezio Flagello (1931–2009) operatic bass
- Gloria Foster (1933–2001) actress
- Harry Frazee (1880–1929), owner of the Boston Red Sox
- Lou Gehrig (1903–1941), Hall of Fame baseball player
- Roy J. Glauber (1925–2018), Nobel Laureate-Physics
- Gilbert Gottfried (1955–2022), American stand-up comedian and actor, best known for his exaggerated shrill voice, strong New York accent.
- Billy Golden (1858–1926), blackface comic and singer
- Rose Gregorio (1925–2023), actress
- Ulu Grosbard (1929–2012) motion picture and stage director, producer
- Marion Harris (1896–1944), singer
- Valerie Jill Haworth (1945–2011), British actress
- Mrs. Julian Heath (1863–1932), radio personality
- Grace Henderson (1860–1944), actress
- Gustave Herter (1830–1898), furniture maker and interior decorator
- Gil Scott-Heron, (1949-2011), jazz poet, singer, musician and author
- Al Hodge (1912–1979), actor
- May Irwin (1862–1938), comedian
- Christopher (Chris) Jasper (1951-2025), composer/musician/recording artist, member of the Isley Brothers/Isley-Jasper-Isley and solo recording artist
- Danny Kaye (1911–1987), actor and comedian
- Guy Kibbee (1882–1956), actor
- Joseph Kilgour (1863–1933), Canadian actor
- Ruth Laredo (1937–2005), pianist
- William Van Duzer Lawrence (1842–1927), founder of Sarah Lawrence College
- Corky Lee (1947–2021), photographer
- Herbert H. Lehman (1878–1963), politician
- Jeffreys Lewis (abt. 1852–1926), actress
- Joseph J. Little (1841–1913), U.S. Representative from New York
- Milton S. Littlefield (1830–1899), Union Army officer
- Cissie Loftus (1876–1943), Scottish-born actress, singer, comedian and vaudevillian
- Dorothy Loudon (1925–2003), Tony Award-winning actress
- Mario Majeroni (1870–1931), Italian-born actor, nephew of Adelaide Ristori
- Tommy Manville (1894–1967), heir to the Johns Manville asbestos fortune
- Jack McGowan (1894–1977), Broadway writer, performer and producer
- Claudia McNeil (1917–1993), actress
- Herman A. Metz (1867–1934), U.S. Congressman
- Anna Moffo (1932–2006), operatic soprano
- William Muldoon (1852–1933), wrestler
- Lon Myers (1858–1899), sprinter and middle distance runner
- Allan Nevins (1890–1971), historian and journalist
- Anne Nichols (1891–1966), playwright and screenwriter
- Carlotta Nillson (1876–1951), actress
- Caroline Love Goodwin O'Day (1875–1943), U.S. Representative from New York
- Jansen Panettiere (1994–2023), actor
- Eulace Peacock (1914–1996), track and field athlete
- Ann Pennington (1893–1971), Ziegfeld actress
- David Graham Phillips (1867–1911), journalist and novelist
- Jesse S. Phillips (1871–1954), lawyer, assemblyman, State Insurance Superintendent and insurance executive
- Harriet Quimby (1875–1912), pioneer aviator
- Sergei Rachmaninoff (1873–1943), composer, pianist and conductor
- Ayn Rand (1905–1982), author, philosopher, playwright and screenwriter
- Jacob Ruppert (1867–1939), owner of the New York Yankees
- Soupy Sales (1926–2009), comedian
- David Sarnoff (1891–1971), businessman head of RCA
- Fritzi Scheff (1879–1954), operatic soprano and actress
- Gordon Scott (1926–2007), actor
- Peri Schwartz (1951–2021), artist
- Ann Shoemaker (1891–1978), actress
- Richard B. Shull (1929–1999), actor
- Ivan F. Simpson (1875–1951), Scottish actor
- Leo Singer (1877–1950), manager of the Singer Midgets vaudeville group
- Alison Skipworth (1863–1952), English actress
- Alfred Holland Smith (1863–1924), president of the New York Central Railroad
- Howard Smith (1893–1968), character actor
- Mildred Joanne Smith (1921–2015), actress and educator
- Peter Moore Speer (1862–1933), U.S. Congressman
- Ellsworth Milton Statler (1863–1928), hotelier
- Henry Stephenson (1871–1956), actor
- Max Stern (1898–1982), entrepreneur and philanthropist
- Lewis Stone (1879–1953), actor
- Oscar W. Swift (1869–1940), U.S. Congressman
- Fay Templeton (1865–1939), actress
- Gertrude Thanhouser (1880–1951), actress
- Benjamin I. Taylor (1877–1946), U.S. Congressman
- Deems Taylor (1885–1966), composer and journalist
- Victoria Tolbert (1916–1997), First Lady of Liberia
- Wen-Ying Tsai (1928–2013), cybernetic sculptor
- William L. Ward (1856–1933), U.S. Congressman
- Charles Weidman (1901–1975), dancer and choreographer
- James E. West (1876–1948), first Chief Scout Executive of the Boy Scouts of America
- Spencer Wishart (1889–1914), racecar driver
- William B. Williams (1923–1986), disc jockey
- John North Willys (1873–1935), automobile manufacturer
- Charles E. Wilson (1886–1972), president of General Electric
- Francis Wilson (1854–1935), actor
- Blanche Yurka (1887–1974), theatre and film actress
- Herbert Zelenko (1906–1979), U.S. Congressman
- Florenz Ziegfeld (1869–1932), producer of the Ziegfeld Follies
- Eugene Meyer (financier) (October 1875–1959) fifth chairman of the Federal Reserve.

•Freddie Jackson(1957-2026),singer-songwriter

== Notable interments in Sharon Gardens division ==
- Rhoda Blumberg (1917–2016), author
- Paddy Chayefsky (1923–1981), screenwriter, winner of three Academy Awards
- Fred Friendly (1915–1998), broadcaster
- Philip Gips (1931–2019), film poster artist
- Gilbert Gottfried (1955–2022), comedian, actor
- Alan Kirschenbaum (1961–2012), television producer and writer
- Robert Merrill (1917–2004), baritone, Metropolitan opera star
- Marshall Warren Nirenberg (1927–2010), biochemist
- Freddie Roman (1937–2022), comedian
- Robert Rosenthal (1917–2007), bomber pilot
- Murray Saltzman (1929–2010), rabbi, civil rights leader
- Beverly Sills (1929–2007), operatic soprano
- Lew Soloff (1944–2015), jazz trumpeter
- Lee Wallace (1930–2020), actor
- Elie Wiesel (1928–2016), writer, Holocaust survivor

== Image gallery ==
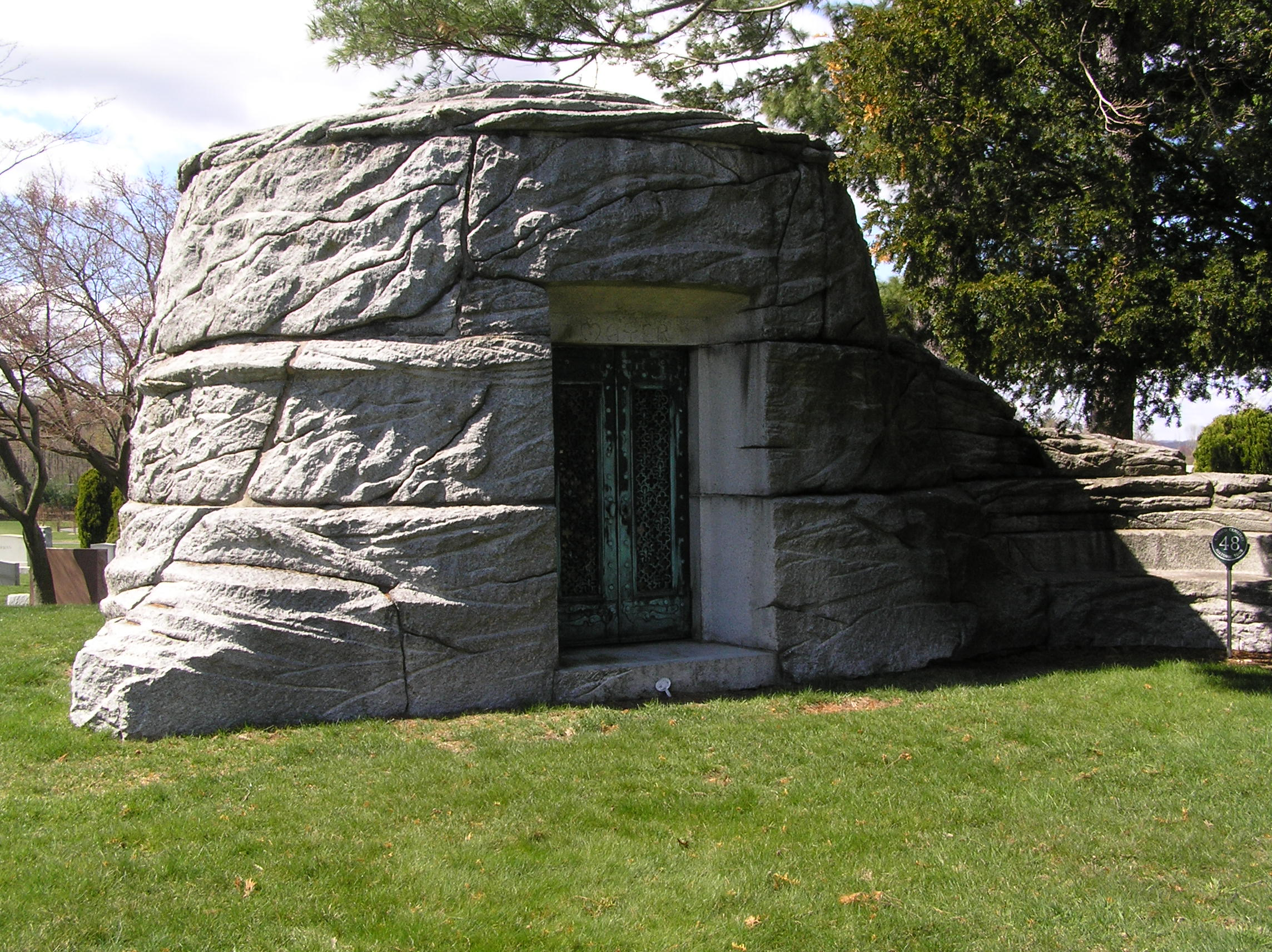
Mayer tumulus

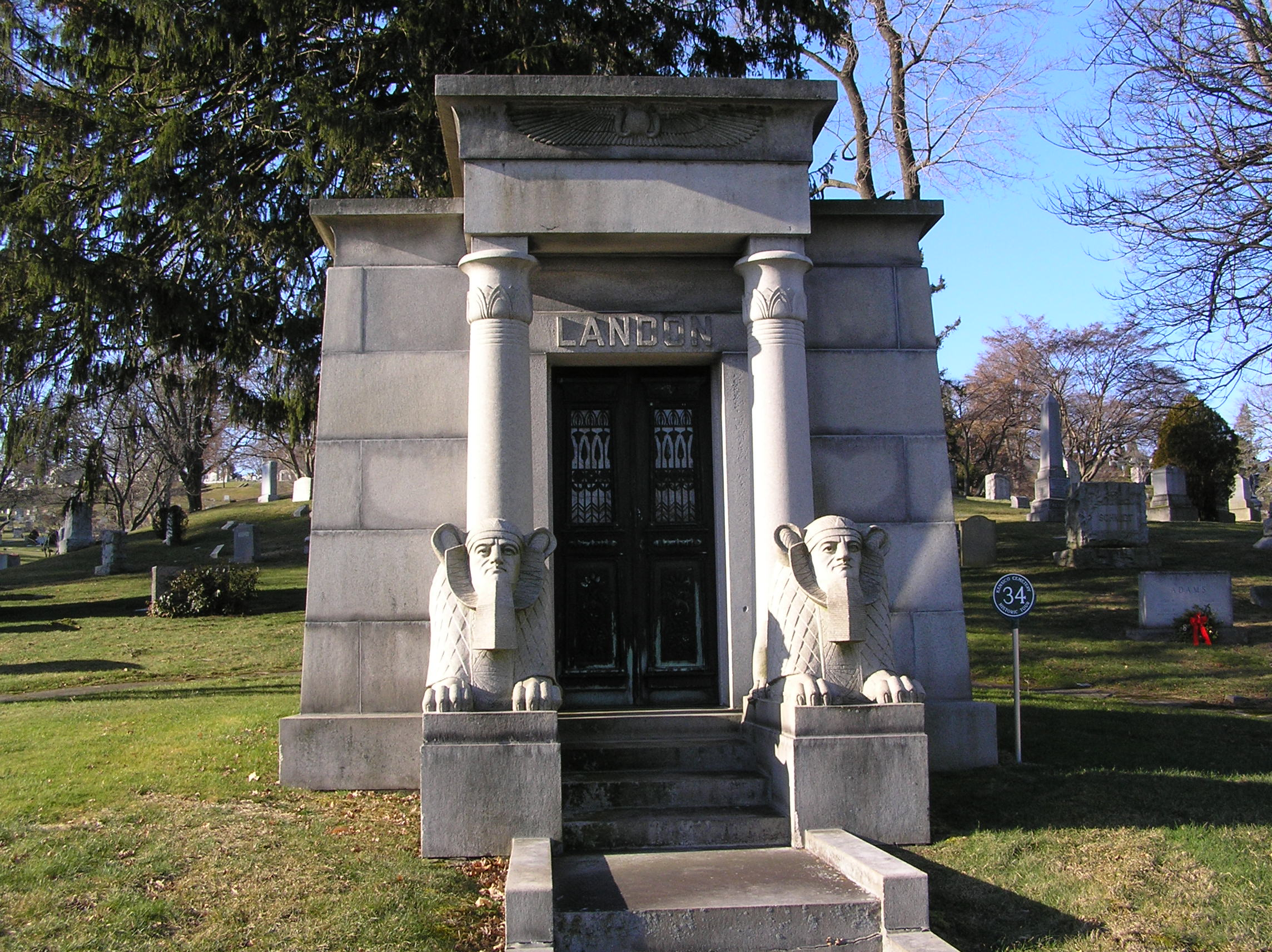
Egyptian Sphinx Tomb

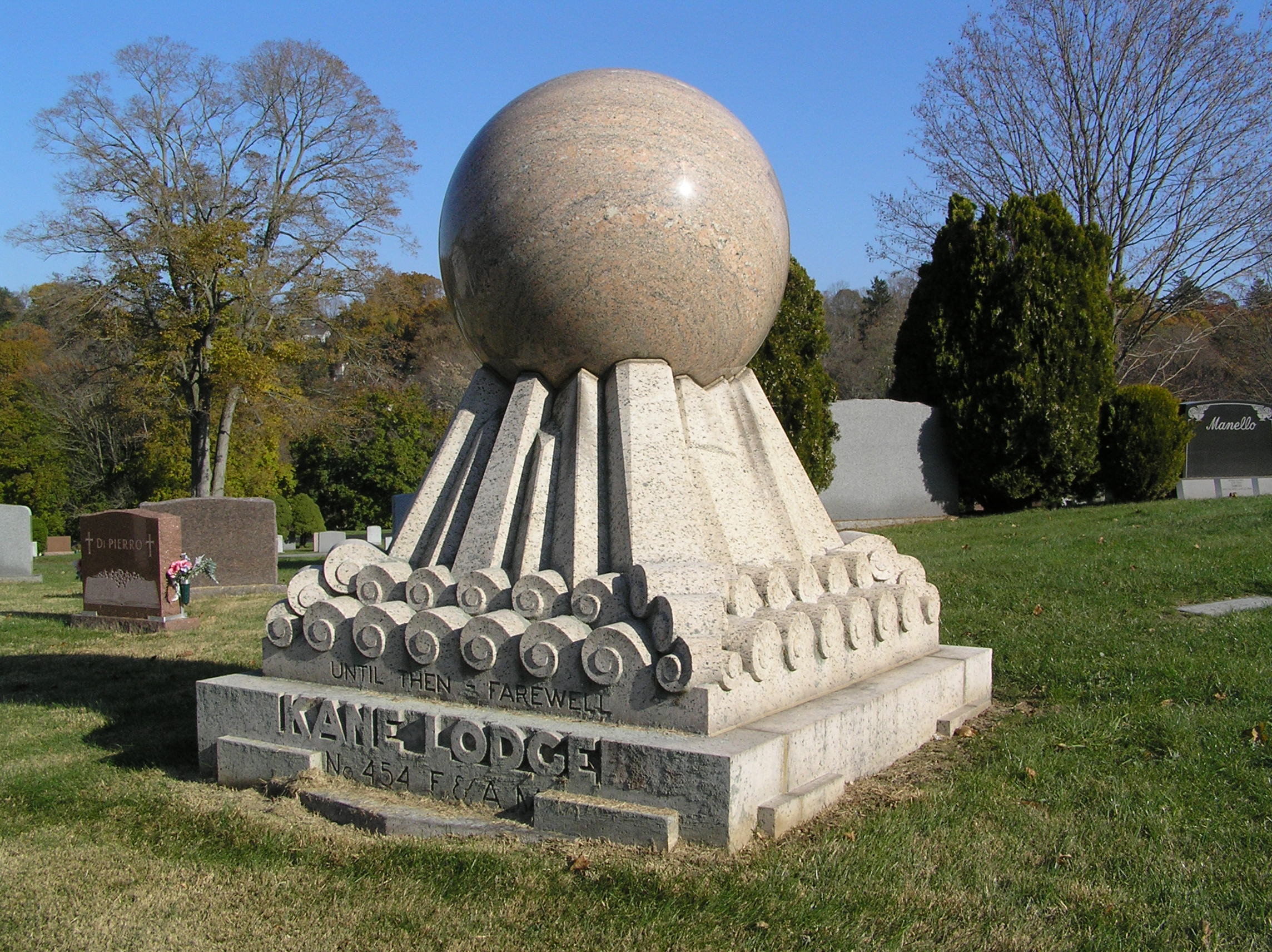
The Kane Lodge sphere

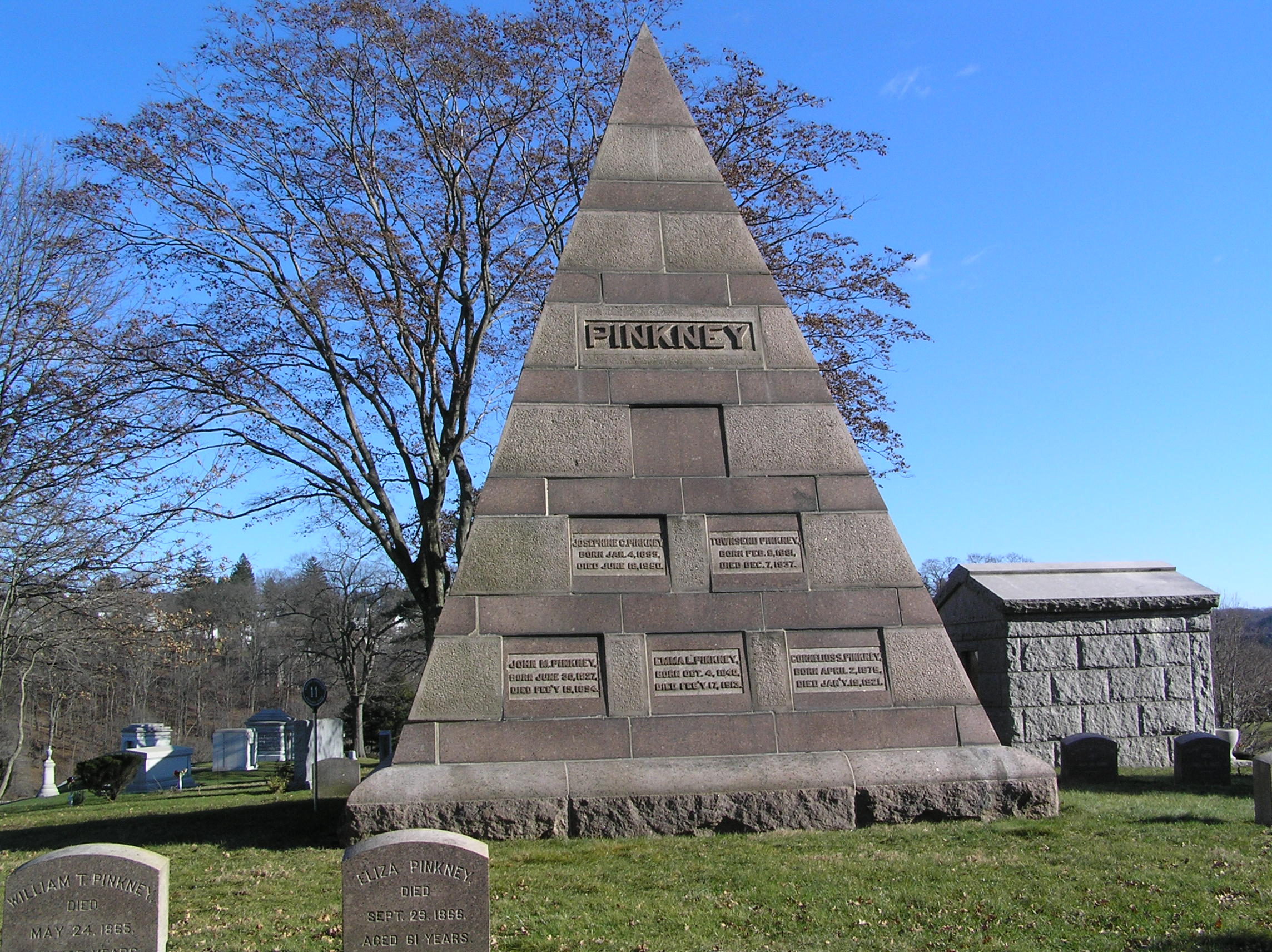
Pinkney Pyramid

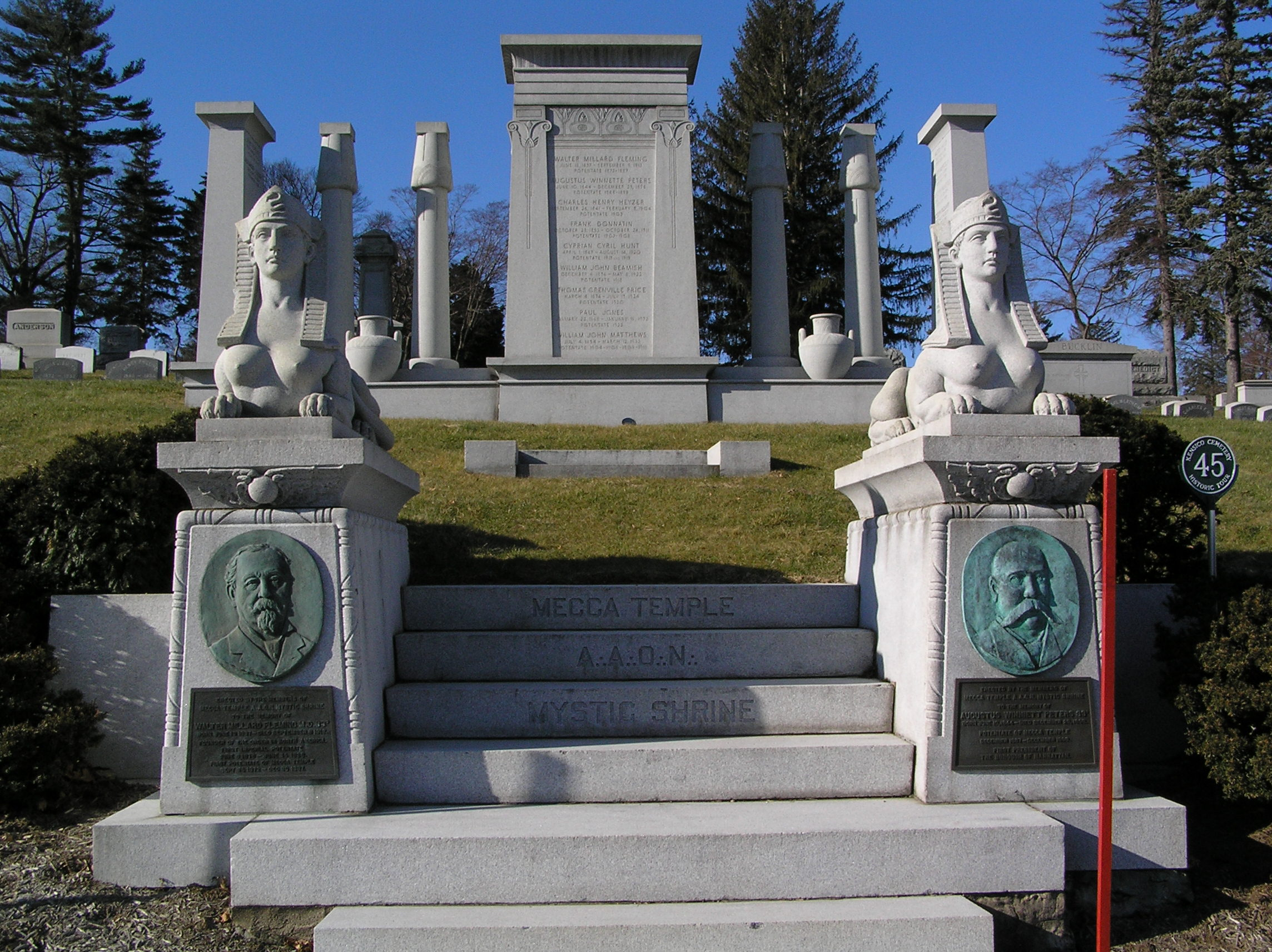
Mecca Temple

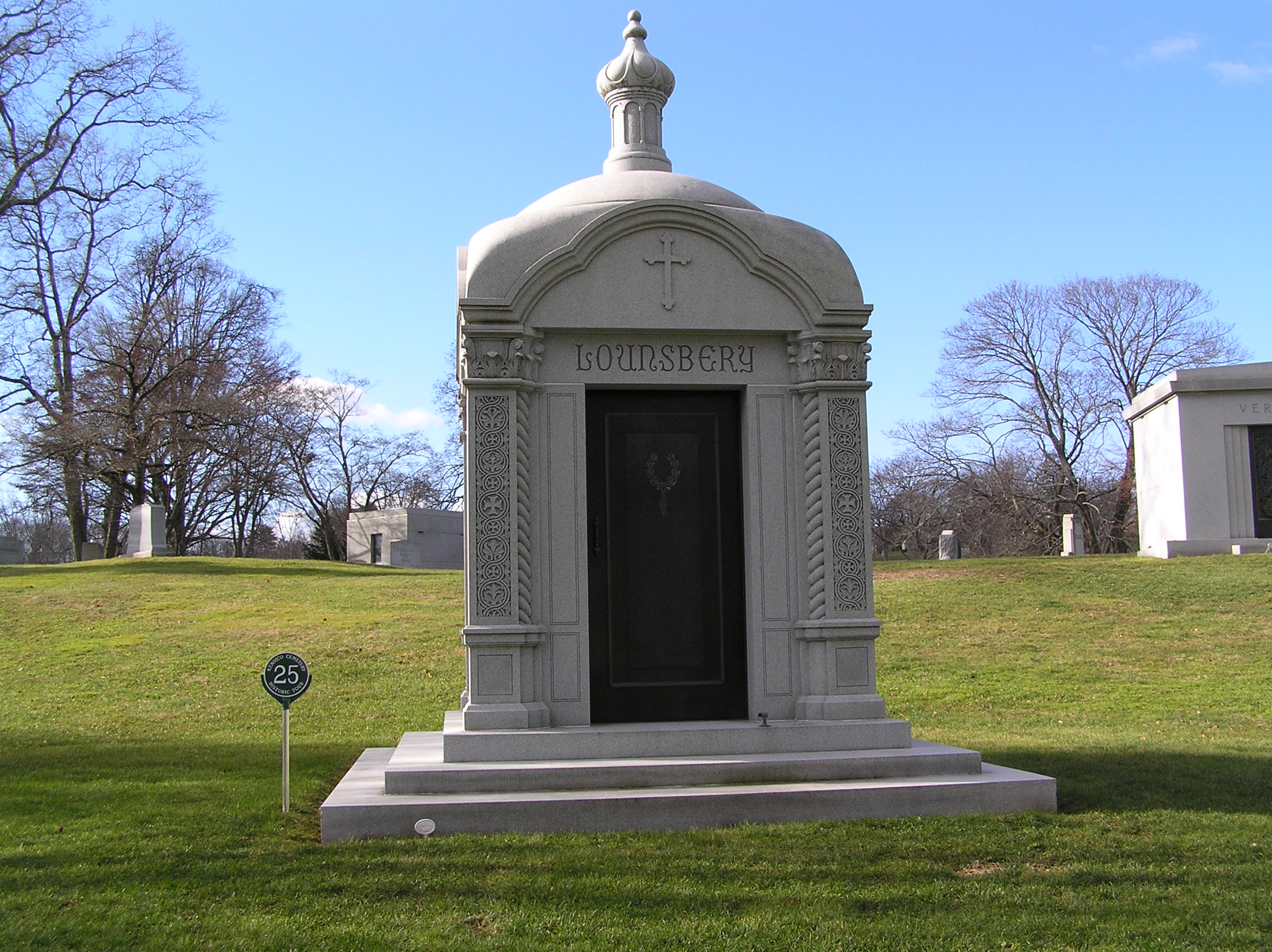
The tomb of Phineas Lounsbery

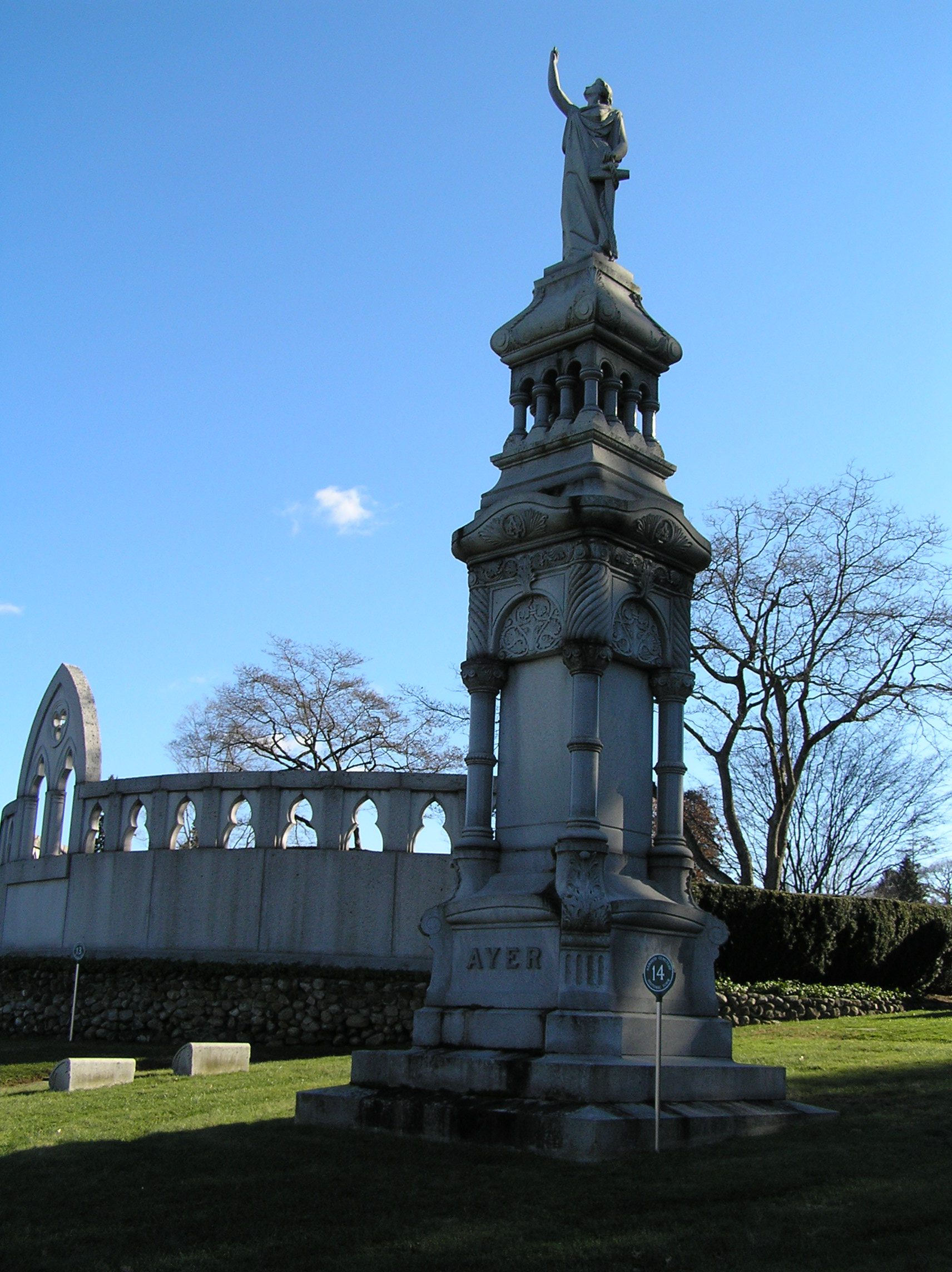
The Ayer statue

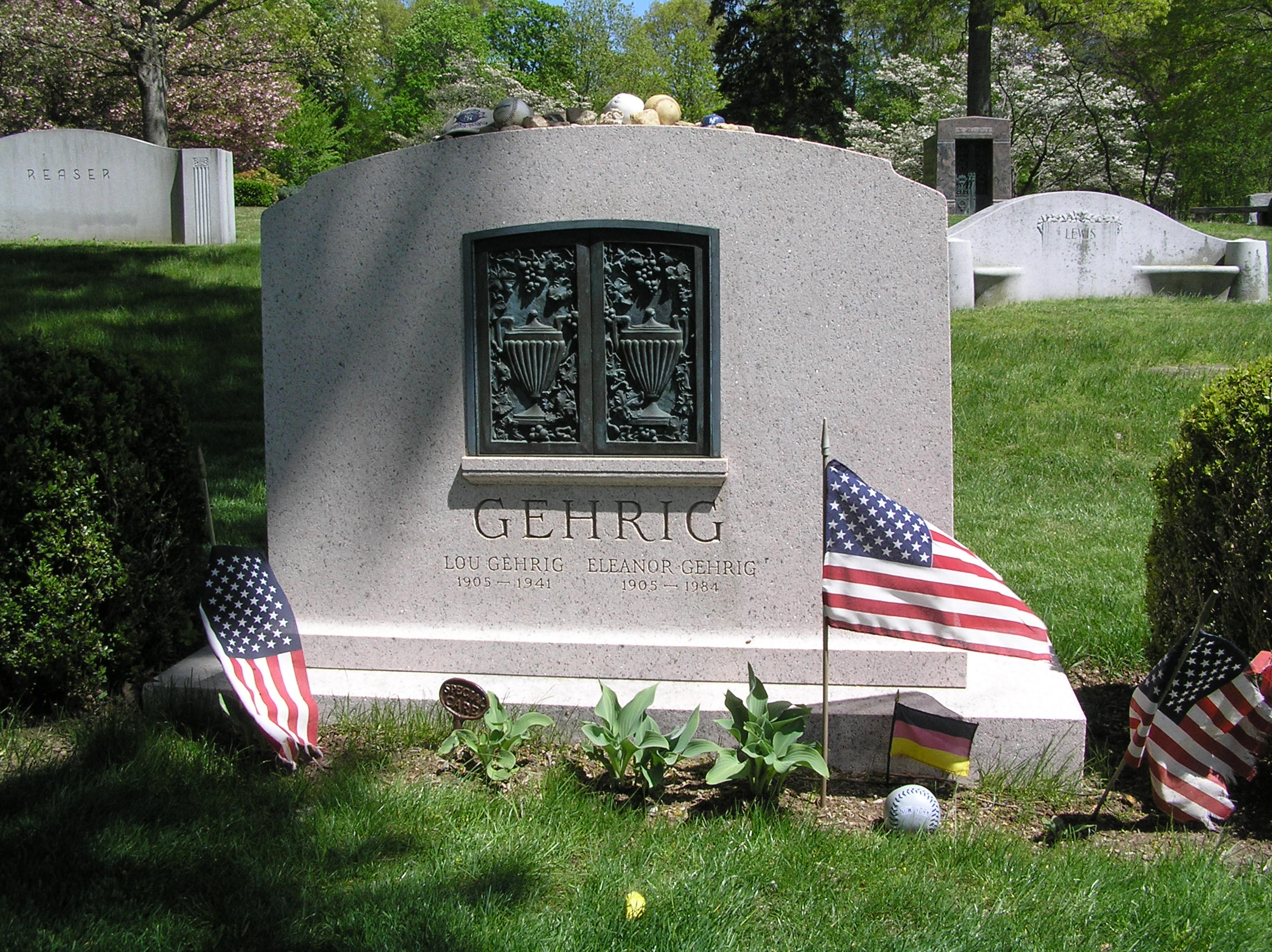
Grave of Lou Gehrig

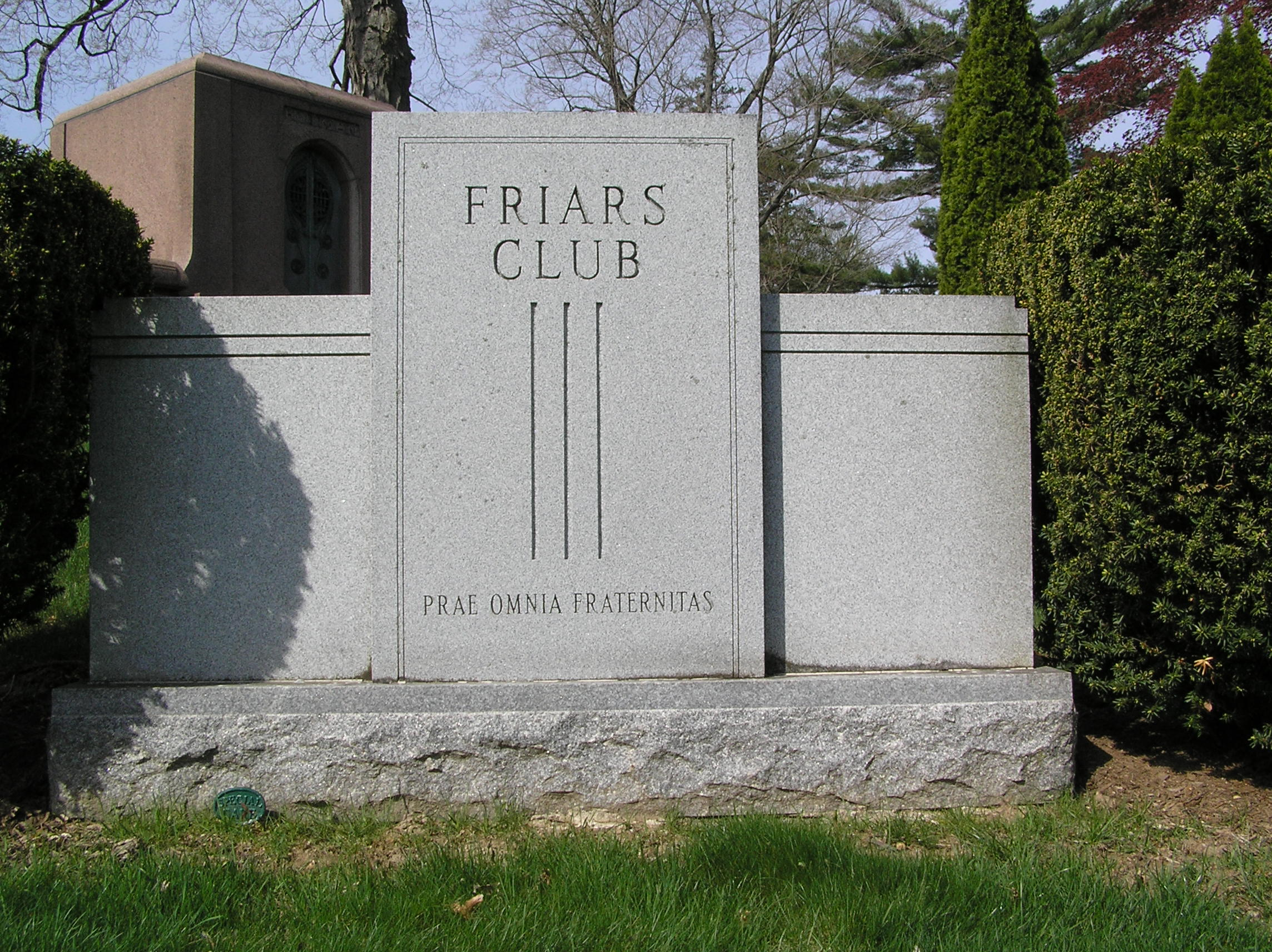
The Friars Club Monument

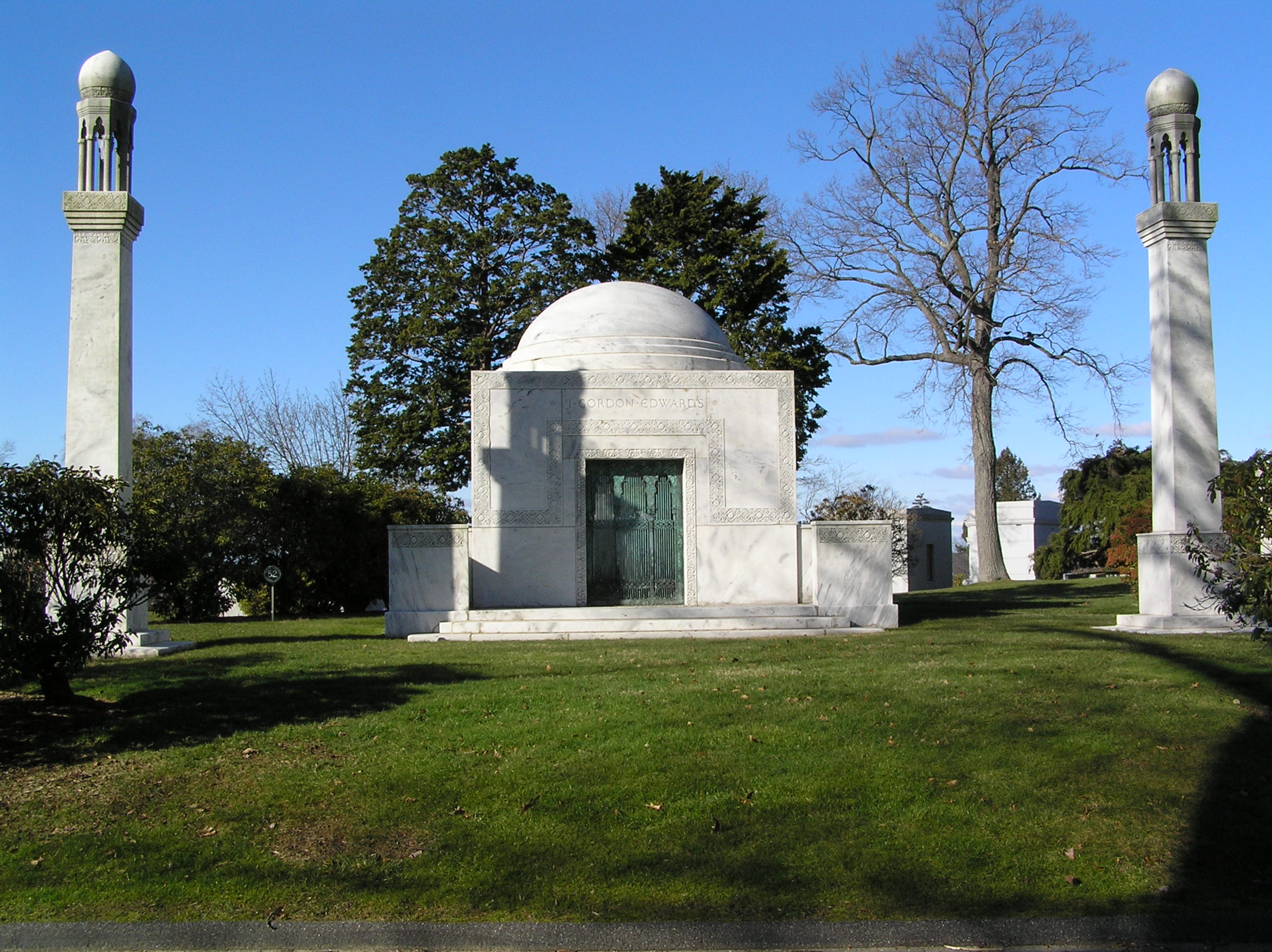
Tomb of J. Gordon Edwards with minaret

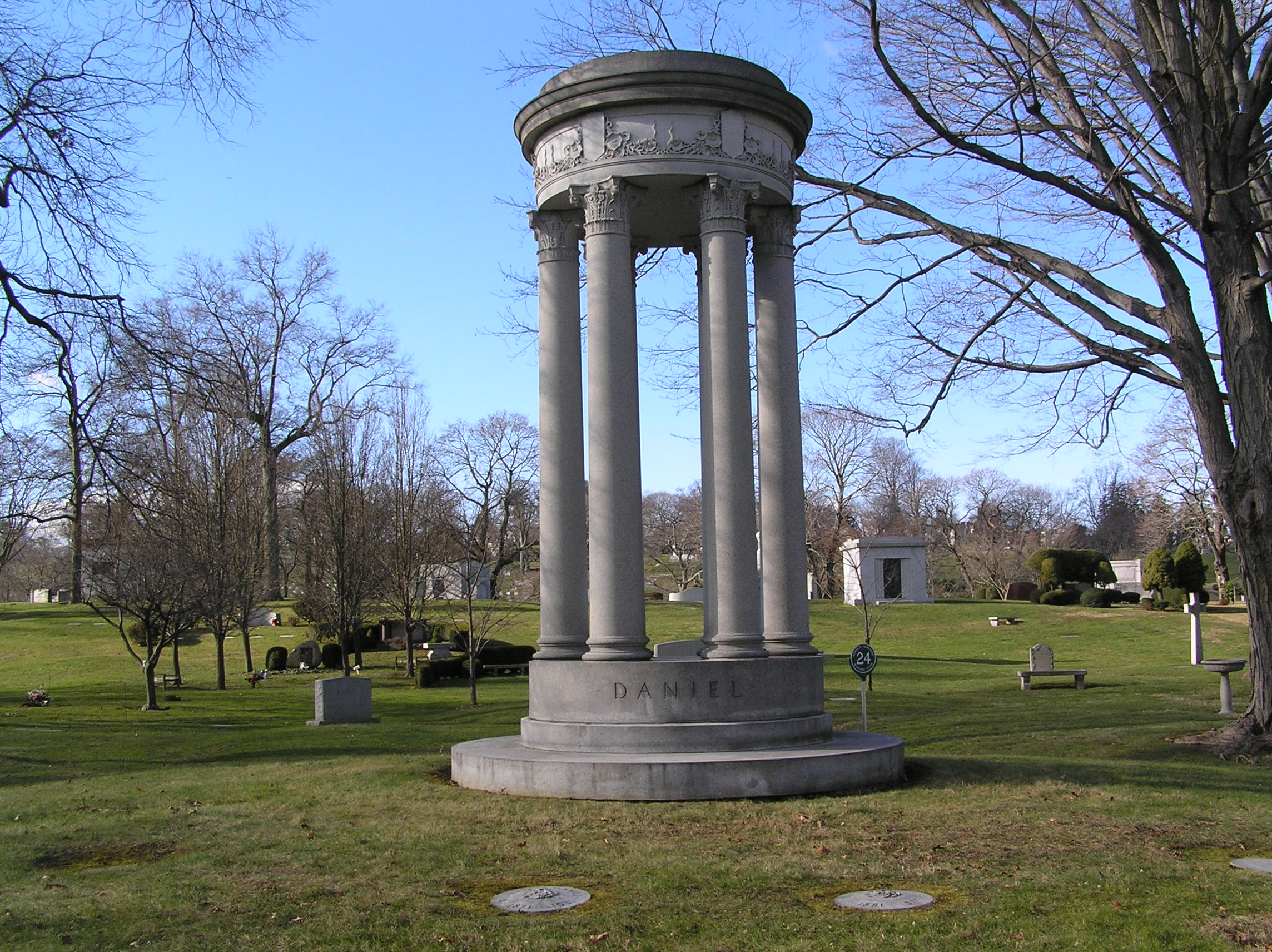
Daniel monument

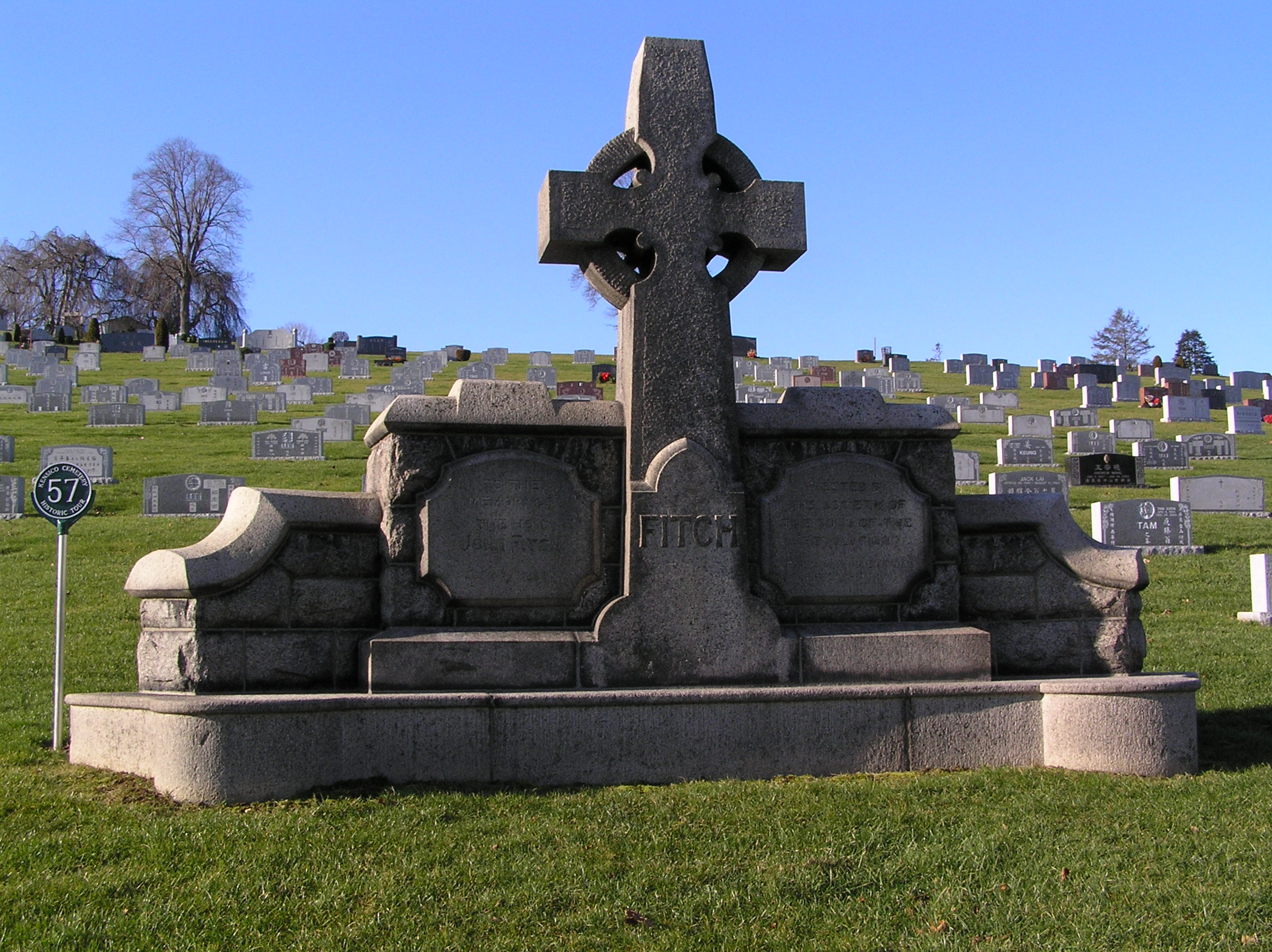
The monument of Judge John Fitch

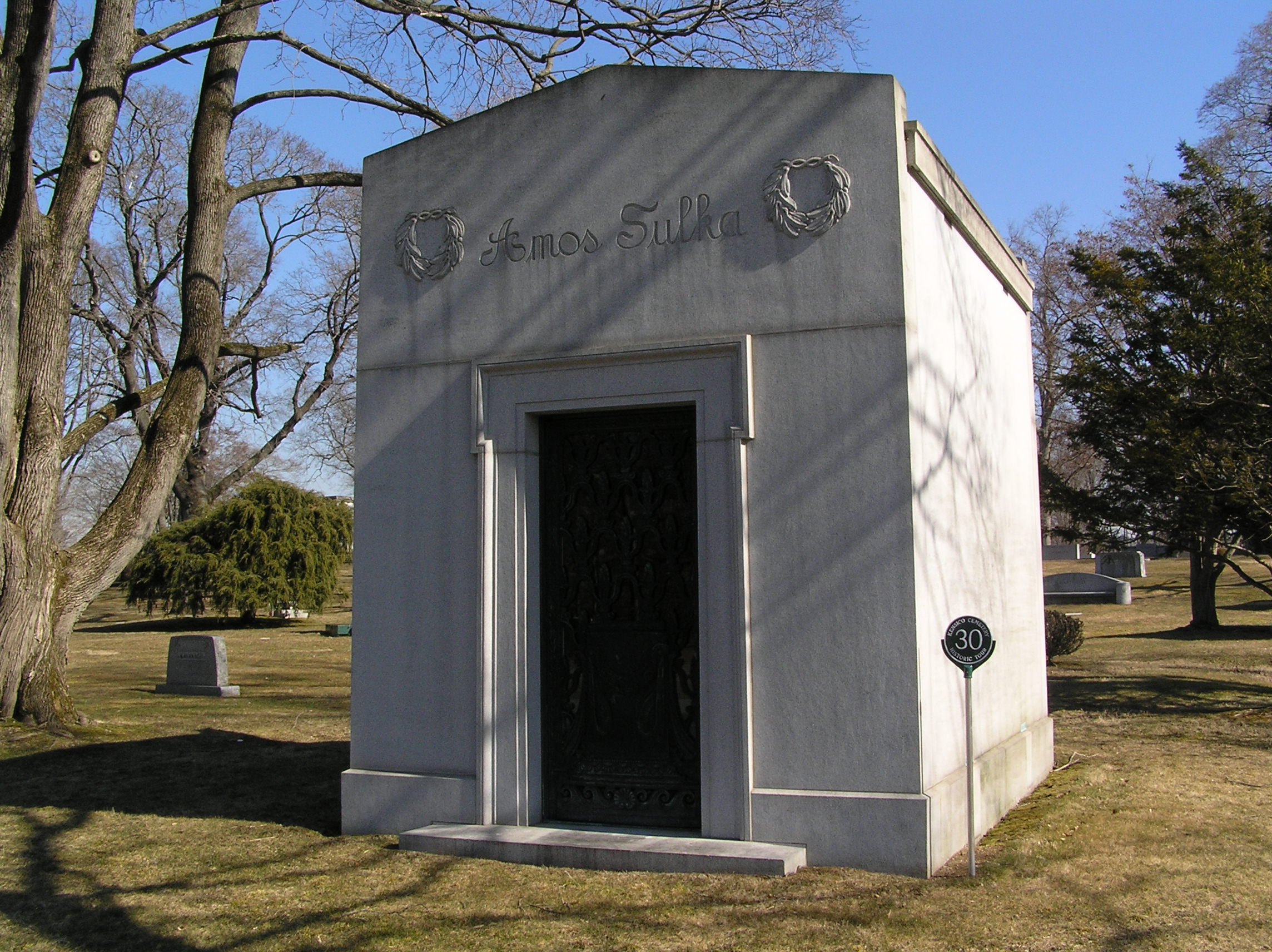
Amos Sulka mausoleum

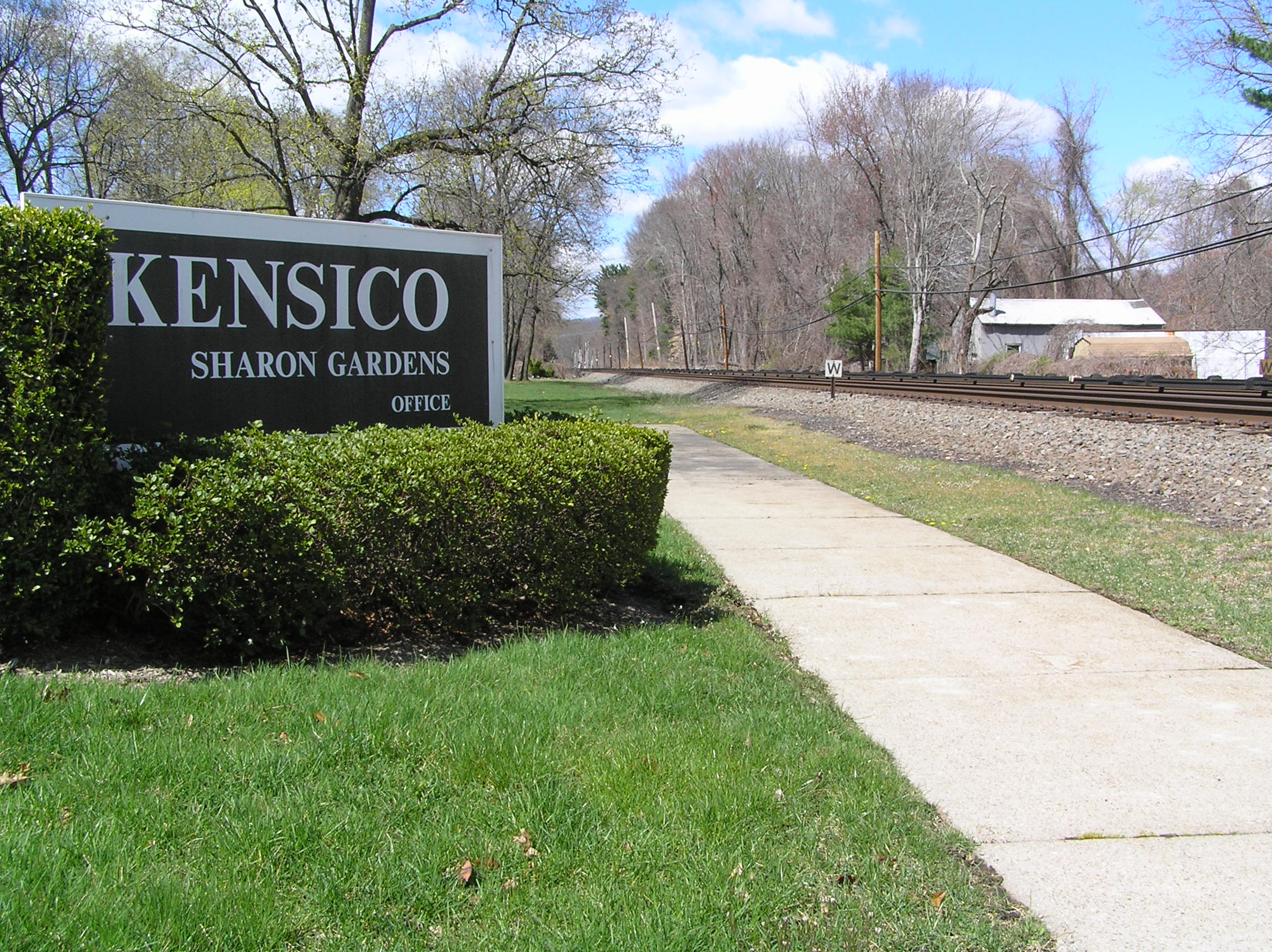
The cemetery on the Metro North line
