= Mrs. Julian Heath =

American radio personality

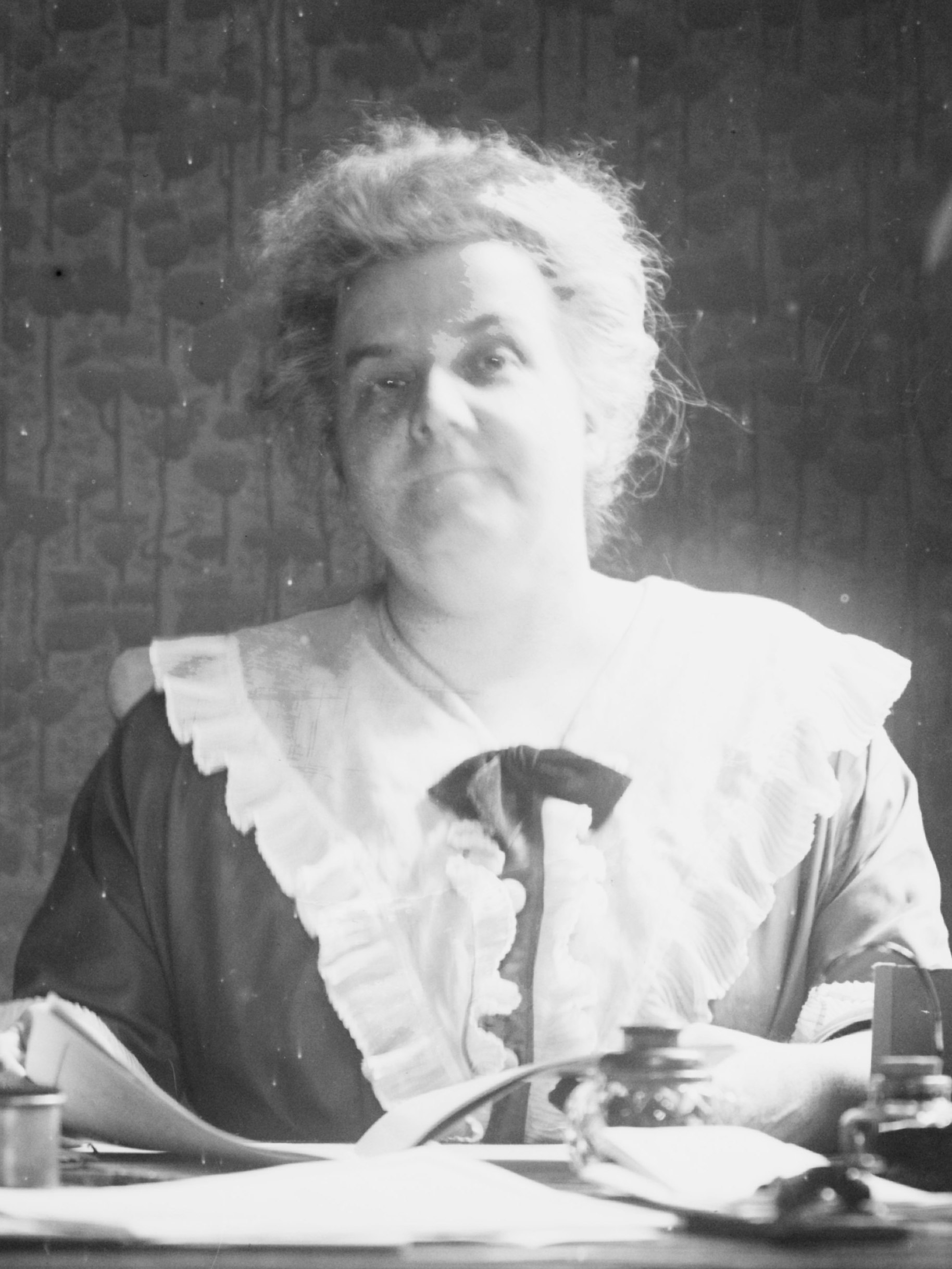
- Julian Heath (Jennie Dewey Heath) in the 1910s
- Born: 1863; Stonington, Connecticut
- Died: November 18, 1932 (aged 68–69); Douglaston, Queens
- Burial place: Kensico Cemetery
- Other name: Jennie Dewey Heath
- Occupation: Radio personality
- Children: Julian D. Heath

Mrs. Julian Heath (Jennie Dewey Heath,) (1863 - November 18, 1932) founded the National Housewives League in 1911, and served as its president until her death in 1932.

In 1924 she began regularly appearing on the WJZ radio station in New York, talking about home economics. She was on-air five days a week for several years. Before starting the radio show, the Housewives League had its share of scandals due to conflicts of interest arising from endorsements of food manufacturers who also advertised heavily in the league's publications.

Earlier in life, Heath also did some work with Jacob Riis at the Flower Mission and Riis Settlement House.

Heath was born in Stonington, Connecticut, and died at her home in Douglaston, Queens in 1932, survived by her son Julian D. Heath, and was buried at Kensico Cemetery.
