= Beating of Peter Yew =

1975 police brutality case in New York City

Peter Yew
- Traditional Chinese: 姚楊勛
- Simplified Chinese: 姚杨勋
Transcriptions
Standard Mandarin
- Hanyu Pinyin: Yáo Yángxūn
Yue: Cantonese
- Yale Romanization: Yìuh Yèuhng-fān
- Jyutping: Jiu4 Joeng4-fan1

On April 26, 1975, Peter Yew (simplified Chinese: 姚杨勋; traditional Chinese: 姚楊勛), a Chinese American engineer, was detained and beaten by white police officers after intervening when they assaulted a 15-year-old during a traffic incident. This prompted "unprecedented" protests against police brutality by the Chinese community in New York City in May that year, which successfully led to several changes in the police force and city government.

== Background ==
Following the passage of the 1965 Immigration Act, an increase in the number of people allowed to migrate to the United States from China led to a huge growth in the population of Manhattan Chinatown, where a quarter of the 20,000 Chinese immigrants permitted per year decided to move. This growth lead to increasing business competition and unemployment, which was compounded by the lack of social services offered by a financially declining city government in the 1970s. In response, gang activity increased, which was fueled by the tongs as they saw them as a way to make more money from newer immigrants and employ local youth. Edward M. McCabe was appointed as the new Fifth Precinct captain by the NYPD to crack down on this activity, leading to an increase in raids, accusations of police brutality, and stop-and-frisk searches. Meanwhile, amidst the development of the Asian American movement, activists formed Asian Americans for Equal Employment (AAFEE) in 1974 to respond to a lack of Asian American workers on the Confucius Plaza housing project. The organization, which used civil disobedience and protest strategies from the civil rights movement, filled a void in community advocacy and saw potential in further gains after successfully getting the contractors to hire 27 mostly Asian workers from ethnic minority groups.

== Incident ==
The initial incident occurred on April 26, 1975, after a crowd of Chinese-Americans had gathered at the scene of an altercation between a Chinese-American driver and a white driver, who kept colliding into each other using their vehicles. After the white driver left the scene and entered the Fifth Precinct station, law enforcement officers pushed people to the ground when dispersing the crowd. When they "mishandled" a 15-year-old in the crowd, Peter Yew, a 27-year old engineer and Brooklynite, attempted to stop them and protested their treatment. In response, the police detained, stripped and beat him in the Fifth Precinct office. He was hospitalized for contusions and a sprained wrist. The police claimed he has assaulted an officer and Yew had felony charges filed against him.

== Response and protests ==
A bystander surnamed Moi informed Chinese Consolidated Benevolent Association (CCBA) president Man Bun Lee, who met Yew at the police station with the help of a Chinese interpreter there; the CCBA held an emergency meeting and agreed to a number of measures to display their discontent with the incident and broader policing issues, but did not call for a mass protest.

The first protest, organized by AAFEE with an attendance of 2,500, took place on May 12. Although the organization had also reached out to the CCBA, they declined as they did not want to cause issues with the city government; however, after seeing the turnout for the demonstration and meeting with AAFEE members, they decided to support them. AAFEE demanded the dismissal of charges against Yew and the removal of McCabe.

On May 19, a second rally marching to City Hall through Mott Street was held with CCBA support; with 10,000-20,000 in attendance, it was considered one of the biggest protests by Asian-Americans up to that point, with many Chinatown businesses shutting down for most of the day and hanging signs with the words "Closed to Protest Police Brutality". Corky Lee photographed the protests and later recalled it as a "Chinatown version of Ferguson. There was no looting, but there was civil unrest. It had to be the first time ever", as the neighborhood had earlier been seen as complacent. Some moderate protestors were given a meeting with a deputy mayor and the police commissioner, causing another faction to split off and exercise more intense tactics, blocking Broadway and holding a vigil into the night. Some fighting occurred between protestors and police.

== Results ==
The charges against Yew were downgraded to a misdemeanor before being dropped altogether. McCabe was transferred to a new post. The Fifth Precinct became less aggressive and set up an auxiliary force of unarmed Chinese American foot officers, but brutality and profiling remained issues.
