= Corky Lee =

American photographer (1947–2021)

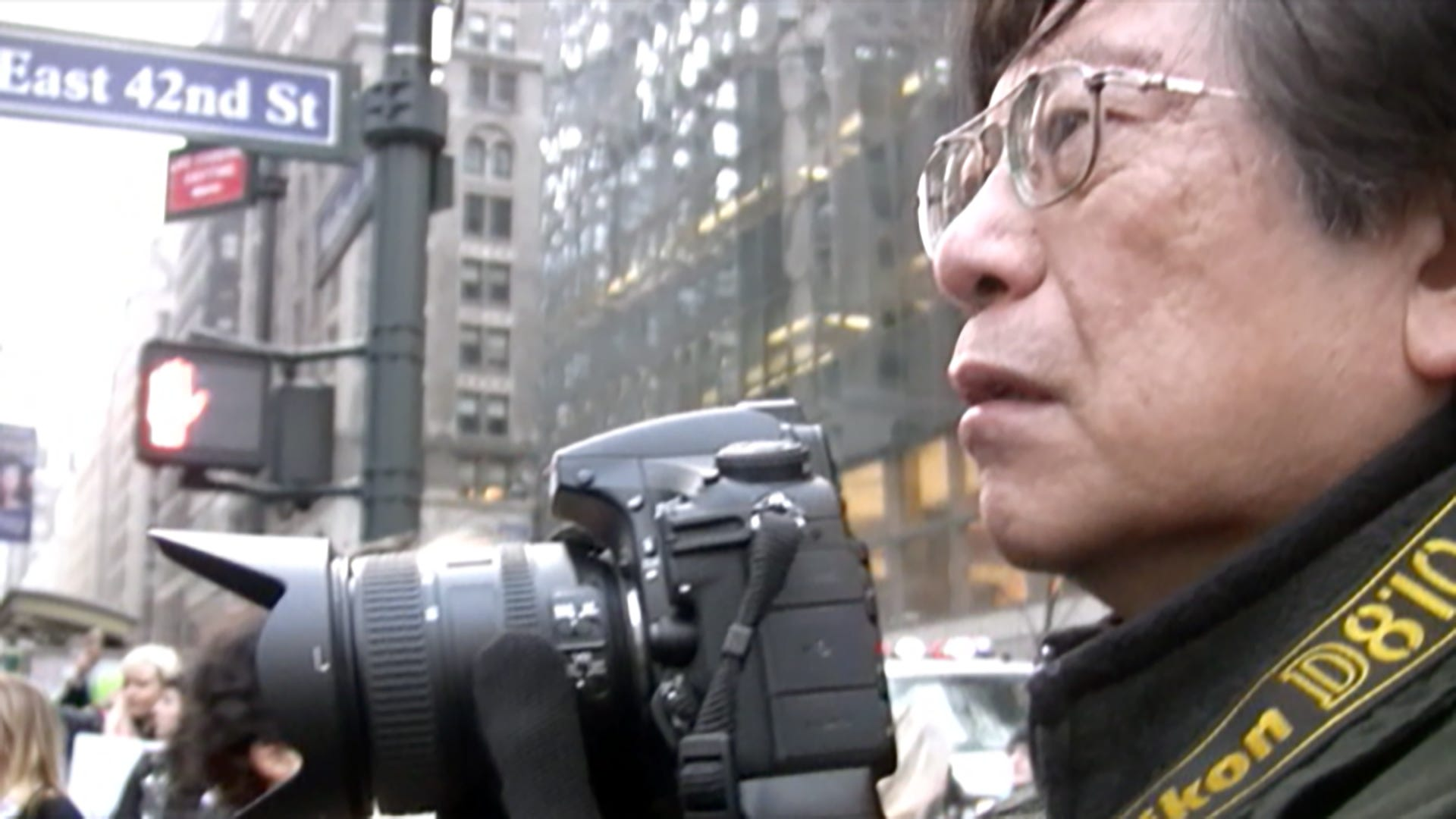
- Corky Lee (Credit: Jennifer Takaki)
- Born: Lee Young Corky (李揚國); September 5, 1947; Queens, New York City, U.S.
- Died: January 27, 2021 (aged 73); Queens, New York City, U.S.
- Resting place: Kensico Cemetery, Valhalla, New York City, U.S.
- Education: Queens College, City University of New York
- Occupations: Activist; Community Organizer; Journalist; Photographer; "unofficial Asian American Photographer Laureate"

Young Corky Lee (September 5, 1947 – January 27, 2021) was a Chinese-American activist, community organizer, photographer, journalist, and the self-proclaimed unofficial Asian American Photographer Laureate. He called himself an "ABC from NYC ... wielding a camera to slay injustices against APAs." His work chronicled and explored the diversity and nuances of Asian American culture often ignored and overlooked by mainstream media, striving to make Asian American history a part of American history.

== Early life and education ==
Lee was born on September 5, 1947, in Queens, New York City. He was the second child of Lee Yin Chuck and Jung See Lee, both of whom had immigrated to the United States from Guangdong, Taishan, China. His father, who had served in the US Army in World War II, owned a laundrette. His mother was a seamstress. Lee had an older sister (Fee) and three younger brothers (John, James, and Richard). Lee took on the nickname, "Corky", to avoid the constant mispronunciation of his given name, pointing to an awareness of his American-born Chinese identity that would inform his later work.

Lee attended Jamaica High School before going on to study American history at Queens College in 1965. Lee taught himself photography, borrowing cameras because he could not afford his own. He said his work was inspired by an 1869 photograph he had seen in a social studies textbook that celebrated the completion of the transcontinental railroad at Promontory Summit, Utah. While the massive construction project had employed thousands of Chinese workers, the photo depicted only white laborers. This lack of representation inspired Lee's lifelong goal of increasing the visibility of the Asian American community. The Stanford University Chinese Railroad Workers in North America Project would later object to Lee's claims, by pointing out two Chinese workers who are in the famous Andrew J. Russell "handshake" photograph. Lee had begun to update his research and share the news of the railroad workers identified in the A.J. Russell photos among people he met in the time before his death.

== Photographic work ==
After graduating from Queens College, Lee began working as a community organizer at the Two Bridges Neighborhood Council in Manhattan's Chinatown neighborhood. Here, he educated immigrants on their rights in their new country and connected elderly members of the community with social services. This time was also a crucial developmental period for his photographic activism. Lee took particular notice of the poor and unsafe housing conditions common for many in his community and began documenting the daily lives of those around him through photography. This became part of a larger fight for tenant rights, which were increasingly jeapordized as large corporations continued to purchase and seal-off buildings in the area.

Lee's work documented many key events in Asian American political history. Lee's first major published photograph was his 1975 photograph of a Chinese American man named Peter Yew being beaten by NYPD officers, featured in the New York Post. In April of 1975, Yew had witnessed a 15-year-old girl begin beaten by police officers at a traffic stop. When he intervened, he was beaten on the spot and arrested with charges of assault and resisting arrest. Lee's photo captured Yew, covered in blood, as he was being led away by the police officers from a crowd of angry observers. On the day Lee's picture was published, 20,000 people marched from Chinatown to City Hall protesting police brutality in response to the beating of Peter Yew. Lee himself was part of this march, documenting the protestor's march through Chinatown and New York City.

Lee photographed protests after the 1982 murder of Vincent Chin in Michigan. Chin was a young Chinese American man living in Detroit who was killed by two recently laid-off auto workers, Ronald Ebens, a former superintendent at Chrysler Motors, and his stepson. The perpetrators attacked Chin, of Chinese descent, after mistaking him for being Japanese, as Japanese companies were blamed for the loss of American auto industry jobs. The two men were freed after facing no jail time, at which point protests erupted due to anger and discontent over the result of trial. Similar to the case of Peter Yew, Lee's photographs documented yet another event representative of the resistance against Asian American discrimination.

One of Lee's most famous photos was taken after 9/11 and captured a Sikh man in Jersey City with an American flag draped over his shoulders in protest against the rising anti-Hindu violence.

In 2014, Lee's career came full circle when he returned to scene of the famous Transcontinental railroad photo with 400 Chinese Americans from around the country to reshoot the photo and rectify the absence he had observed when he was young.

Lee proclaimed himself the "undisputed unofficial Asian American Photographer Laureate". His photographs documented the daily lives of Asian Americans as well as historical moments in American history. Lee said his camera was a sword to combat racial injustice, to memorialize and make visible those who would otherwise be invisible by documenting the lives of minority-American cultures and communities.

Han Zhang, writing in The New Yorker, described the cultural impact of Lee's work: "Lee was to Chinatown what Bill Cunningham was to the sartorialists of Manhattan, and what Roy DeCarava was to post-Renaissance Harlem." In essence, Zhang suggests that Lee was not only a photographer, but a visual historian for the Asian American community.

== Activism ==
Corky Lee also used methods besides photography to change his community. In August of 1971, Lee helped organize the first Chinatown street health fair. The goal of the fair was to combat the lack of basic health care in the area. Services such as free health screenings and blood pressure tests were offered, and enough money was earned from the event to open the Chinatown Health Clinic. From this clinic eventually grew the Charles B. Wang Community Health Center, which operates primarily for underserved Asian Americans.

Lee also fought for the political rights of the Chinese American community. Before 1994, the New York City Board of Elections had not provided a ballot with Chinese translations of the candidates names in districts with a larger Chinese population. Their reasoning for this choice was that there was not enough space on the ballots to fit characters and the printers could not produce Chinese characters. In response, Lee, who worked at Expedi Printing at the time, produced a sample ballot with all the desired specifications. This led to the first Chinese translations on ballots in New York City and a rise in Chinese American electoral participation.

Later in his life, Lee, along with other AAPI activists, lobbied for Chinese American World War II veterans to receive Congressional gold medals, and in December of 2018, the Chinese American World War II Veterans Congressional Gold Medal Act was passed into law.

== Later life ==
New York City Mayor David Dinkins proclaimed May 5, 1988, "Corky Lee Day," recognizing Lee's work as an important contribution to New York City communities.

Lee regularly published photographs to weekly local newspapers Downtown Express and The Villager during the 1990s and 2000s.

Lee contracted COVID-19 amidst the disease's global pandemic. He developed complications of the virus and died at Long Island Jewish Hospital in Forest Hills, Queens, New York on January 27, 2021. He was 73 years old. It is believed that he became infected with the virus while patrolling Chinatown with neighborhood watch groups that were protecting residents from the rise in anti-Asian violence. Lee's wife, Margaret Dea, died of cancer in 2001. In accordance with his wishes, Lee was interred in Kensico Cemetery following a funeral procession through New York's Chinatown.

== Awards ==
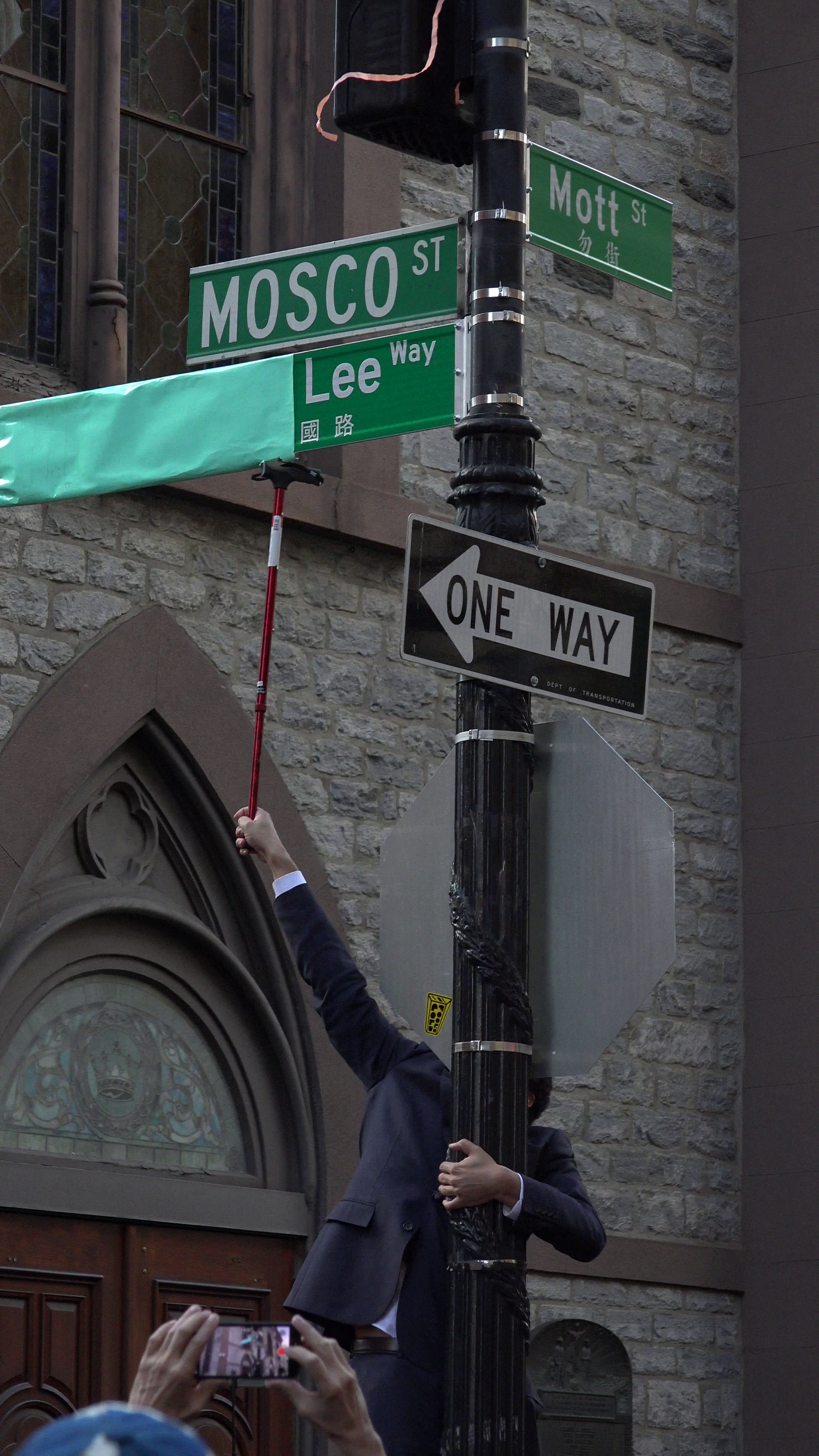
The unveiling of Corky Lee Way in 2023

- 1993, Photographer-Artist-in-Residence Award, Syracuse University
- 1993, Special Recognition Award, Asian American Journalists Association (AAJA)
- 2002, New York Press Association Award
- 2002, Artist-In-Residence, New York University's Asian/Pacific/American Studies Program & Institute
- 2008, Pioneer Award, Organization of Chinese Americans
- 2009, Susan Ahn Award for Civil Rights and Social Justice for Asian Americans and Pacific Islanders, Asian American Journalists Association
- 2014, UC Regents Lecturer, University of California, Los Angeles Asian American Studies Center and Department & Luskin School of Public Affairs Urban Planning Department

== Legacy ==
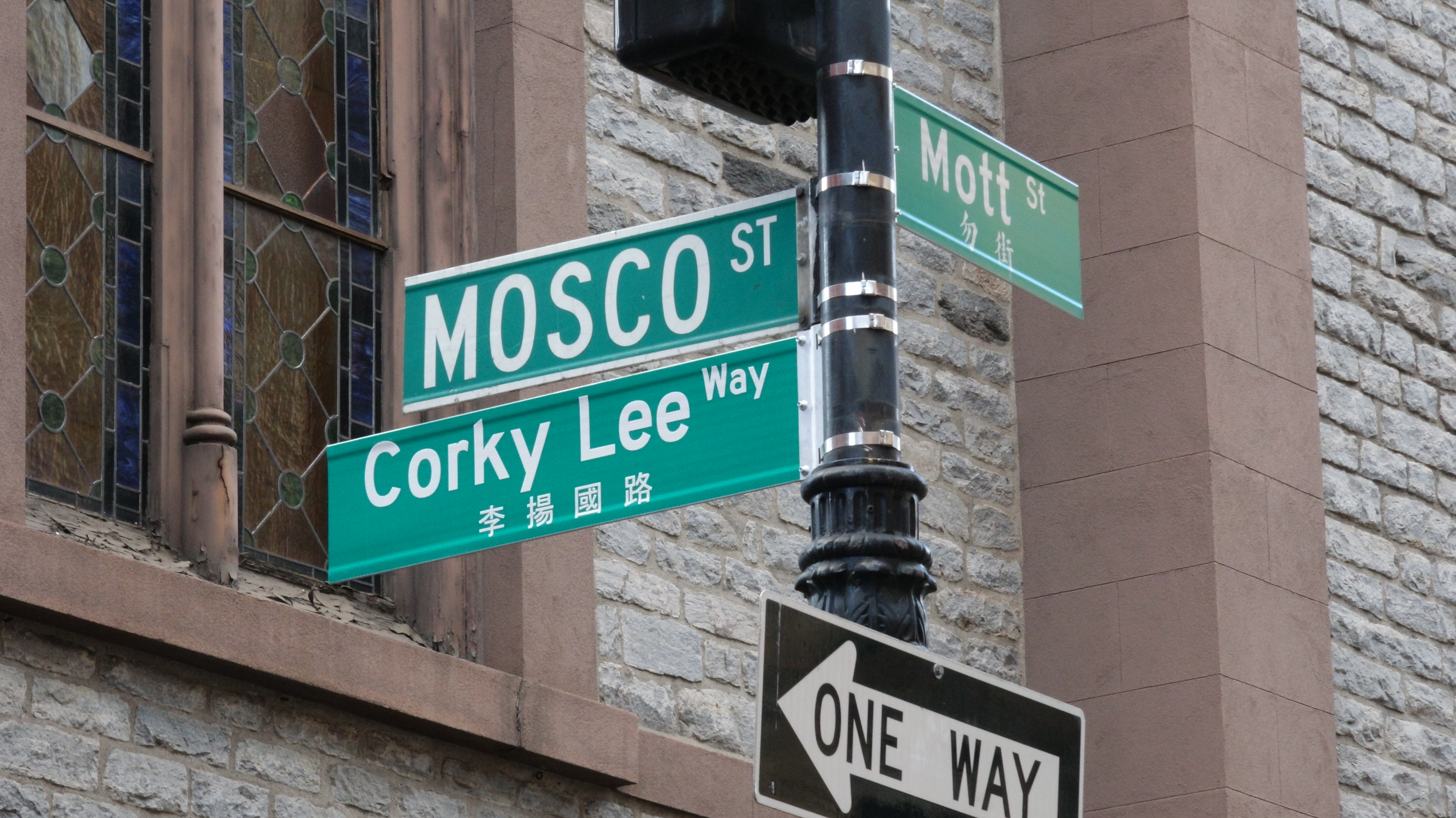
Corky Lee Way sign in Chinatown, NYC, named in 2023

A 2022 documentary, Dear Corky, about Lee's life and community activism was made by director Curtis Chin.

On May 5, 2023, Lee was honored with a Google Doodle.

On October 22, 2023, a street sign for Corky Lee Way was unveiled in New York's Chinatown, at the corner of Mott Street and Mosco Street.

Streaming on PBS Passport, PHOTOGRAPHIC JUSTICE: The Corky Lee Story is a 2024 documentary feature about Corky Lee, "a loving tribute and valuable testament of one man's inexhaustible mission" (New York Sun) "to push mainstream media to include AAPI culture in the visual record of American history.... produc<ing> an astonishing archive of nearly a million compelling photographs." (All is Well Pictures).

In 2024, a book titled Corky Lee's Asian America, was published, containing more than 200 photos taken over his career.
