= Peri Schwartz =

American painter and printmaker (born 1951)

Peri Schwartz (October 4, 1951 – May 7, 2021) was an American painter and printmaker. Her work is held in major museums worldwide.

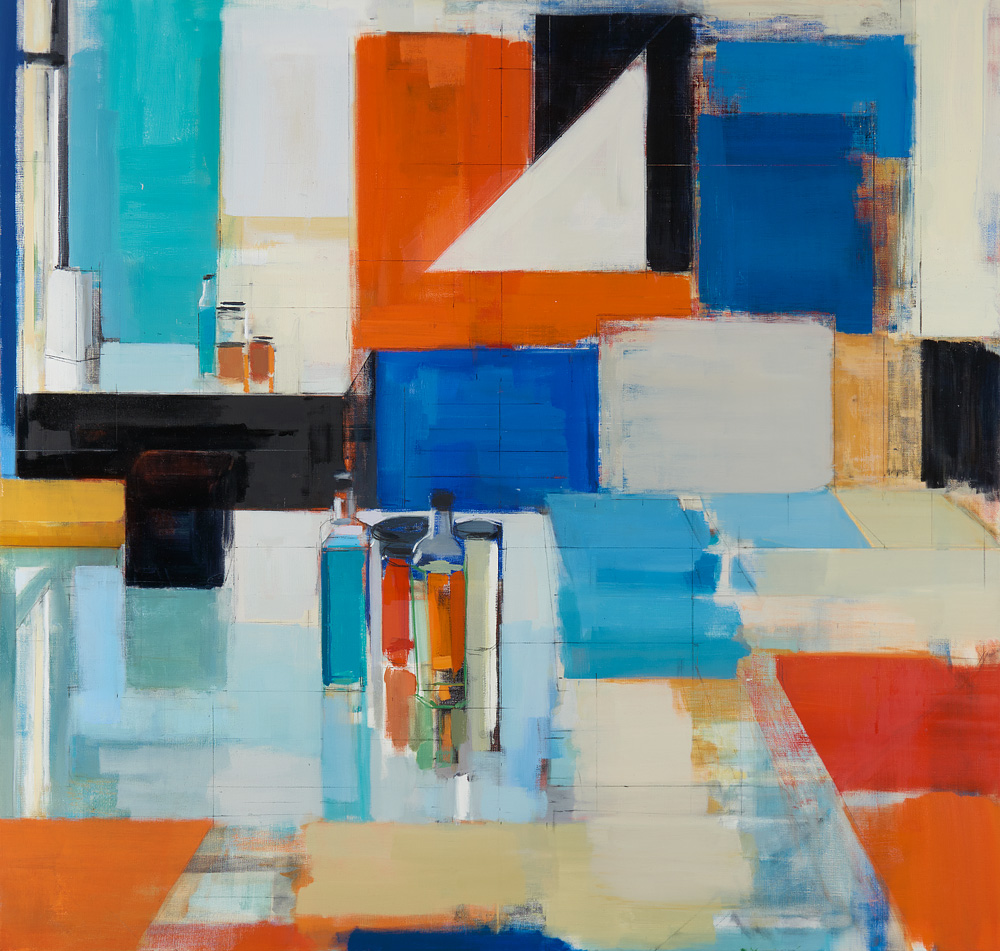
Studio LV

== Life and work ==
Peri Schwartz was born in Brooklyn, New York, and raised in Far Rockaway, New York. She received her BFA from Boston University College of Fine Arts in 1973 and an MFA from Queens College in 1975.

Schwartz's early career concentrated on painting and drawing traditional self-portraits, portraits, and still lifes. In the early 2000s, she began to focus more on her studio as subject. Her works, many of objects from her studio such as tables, books, and paint jars, display prominent angles, shapes and lines. To guide her compositions, Schwartz centered and organized her work on a grid system. In her completed paintings, faint grid lines weave throughout though varied rather than rigid so the work is formal but not stiff.

Schwartz began exhibiting in the United States in the 1990s.

Schwartz lived and worked in New Rochelle, New York. Schwartz died on May 7, 2021, in White Plains, New York, at the age of 69.

== Selected collections ==
- Albertina, Vienna, Austria
- Ashmolean Museum, Oxford, UK
- Bibliotheque Nationale de France, Paris, France
- British Museum, London, UK
- Fogg Museum, Cambridge, MA
- Library of Congress, Washington, DC
- Los Angeles Museum of Art
- Metropolitan Museum of Art, New York, NY
- Museum of Fine Arts, Boston, MA
- New York Public Library, New York, NY
- Staatliche Museum, Berlin, Germany
- Yale University Art Gallery, New Haven, CT

== Selected exhibitions ==
- 2020 Paintings & Works on Paper, Page Bond Gallery, Richmond, VA
- 2019 Form + Color, Gerald Peters Gallery, Santa Fe, NM
- 2018 Color & Process, Gallery NAGA, Boston, MA
- 2017 In the Studio, Murray State University, Murray, KT
- 2016 Constructing From Life, Page Bond Gallery, Richmond, VA
- 2015 Paintings • Drawings • Prints, University of Mississippi Museum, Oxford, MS
- 2014 Composing Paintings, Gallery NAGA, Boston, MA
- 2013 New Watercolors and Drawings, Garvey/Simon Art Access, New York, NY
- 2013 Dwellings, Gerald Peters Gallery, Santa Fe, NM
- 2012 Compositions, Page Bond Gallery, Richmond, VA
- 2010 Color Prints, Abbott and Holder, London, UK
- 2009 Reflections, Hillwood Art Museum, Brookville, NY
- 2008 Objects Considered, Midday Gallery, Englewood, NJ
- 2007 Recent Work, Page Bond Gallery, Richmond, VA
- 2006 Studio Paintings, Reeves Contemporary, New York, NY

== See also ==
- Portrait painting
- Self-portrait
- Still life
