= Lakshman (disambiguation) =

Lakshman may refer to:

- Lakshmana, the brother of Rama in the Indian epic Ramayana
- Laxman Kumara, a character from the Mahabharata
- Lakshmana (Krishna's wife), consort of the Hindu god Krishna
- Lakshman (name), a common Indian given name (including a list of persons with the name)
  - Lakshmana (Chahamana dynasty), medieval Indian ruler
  - Lakshman (director), Indian film director
- Lakshmana (film), a 2016 Indian film
- Laxman Pandey, a fictional character portrayed by Atul Kulkarni in the 2006 Indian film Rang De Basanti

== See also ==
- Lakhan (disambiguation)
- Lakshmanan (disambiguation)
- Lakha (disambiguation)
- Ram Laxman (disambiguation)
- Lakh, 100,000 in the Indian numbering system
- Lachmann, a surname
- Laxman (Scandinavian surname)
- Lakshmanaa, a character from the Mahabharata
- Lakshmana rekha, concept of red-line in Indian culture derived from the Ramayana
- Laksamana, title for an admiral in Malay areas; derived from Lakshmana's role of a companion in the Indian epic
- Jagernath Lachmon (1916–2001), Indo-Surinamese politician
