= Avni Institute of Art and Design =

Art school in Tel Aviv, Israel

Coordinates: 32°3′25.03″N 34°45′42.69″E

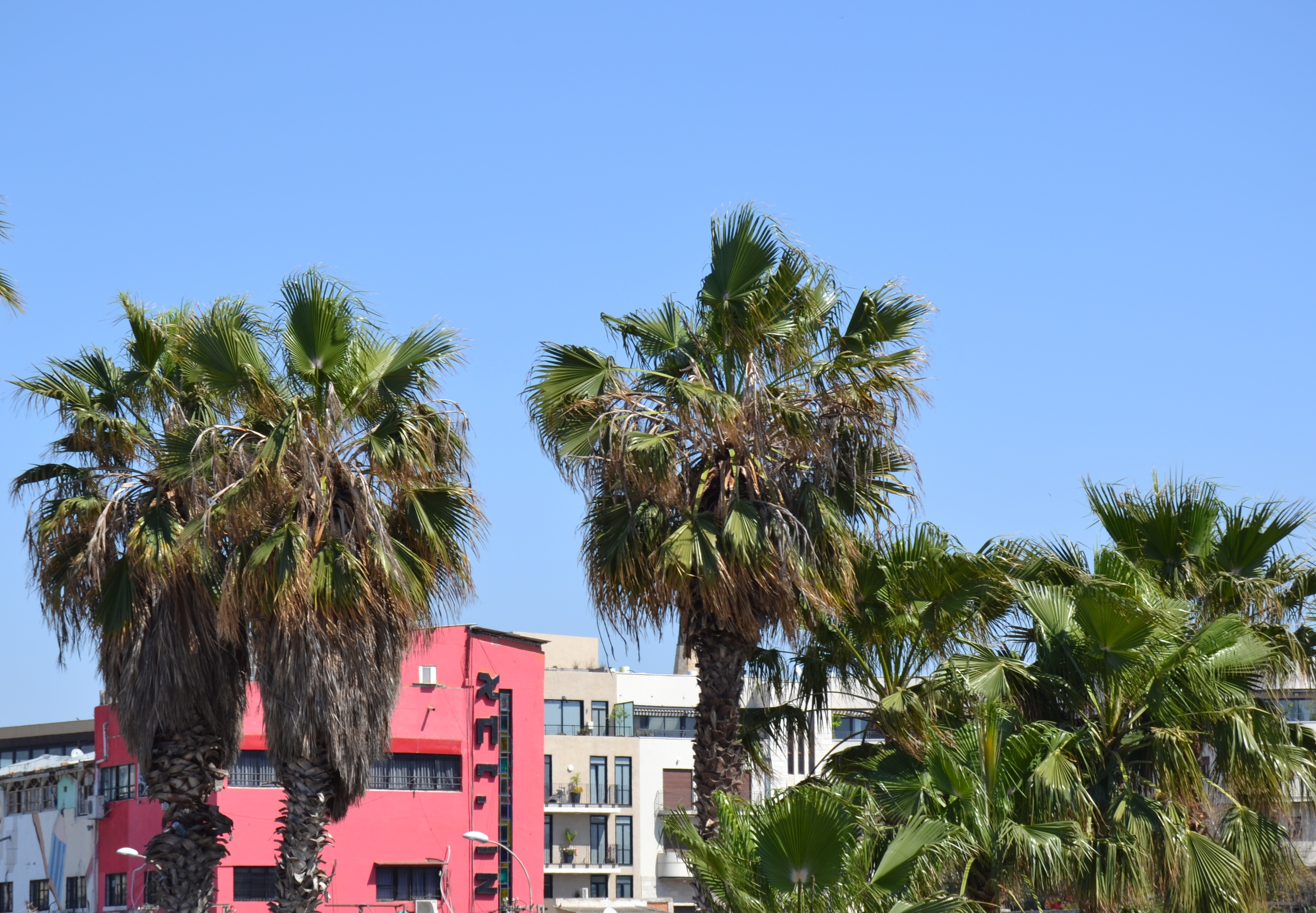
Avni Institute of Art and Design

Avni Institute of Art and Design is an Israeli art school located in Tel Aviv. The school was founded by Aharon Avni, Yehezkel Streichman and Moshe Sternschuss. It first named the Histadrut’s painting and sculpture studio, after a school of the same name founded by Yitzhak Frenkel in the 1920s.

== History ==
The Studia school (later Avni Institute) was established in 1936 by a group of Jewish artists. Among the founders was Aharon Avni, who became the school's first director. After Avni's death the school was renamed in his memory. Several of the founding faculty teachers such Avigdor Stematsky, Yehezkel Streichman and Aharon Avni were students of School of Paris artist Yitzhak Frenkel.

The school offers degrees in art and design and architecture. It also runs a Bachelor of Arts program in collaboration with the Open University of Israel.

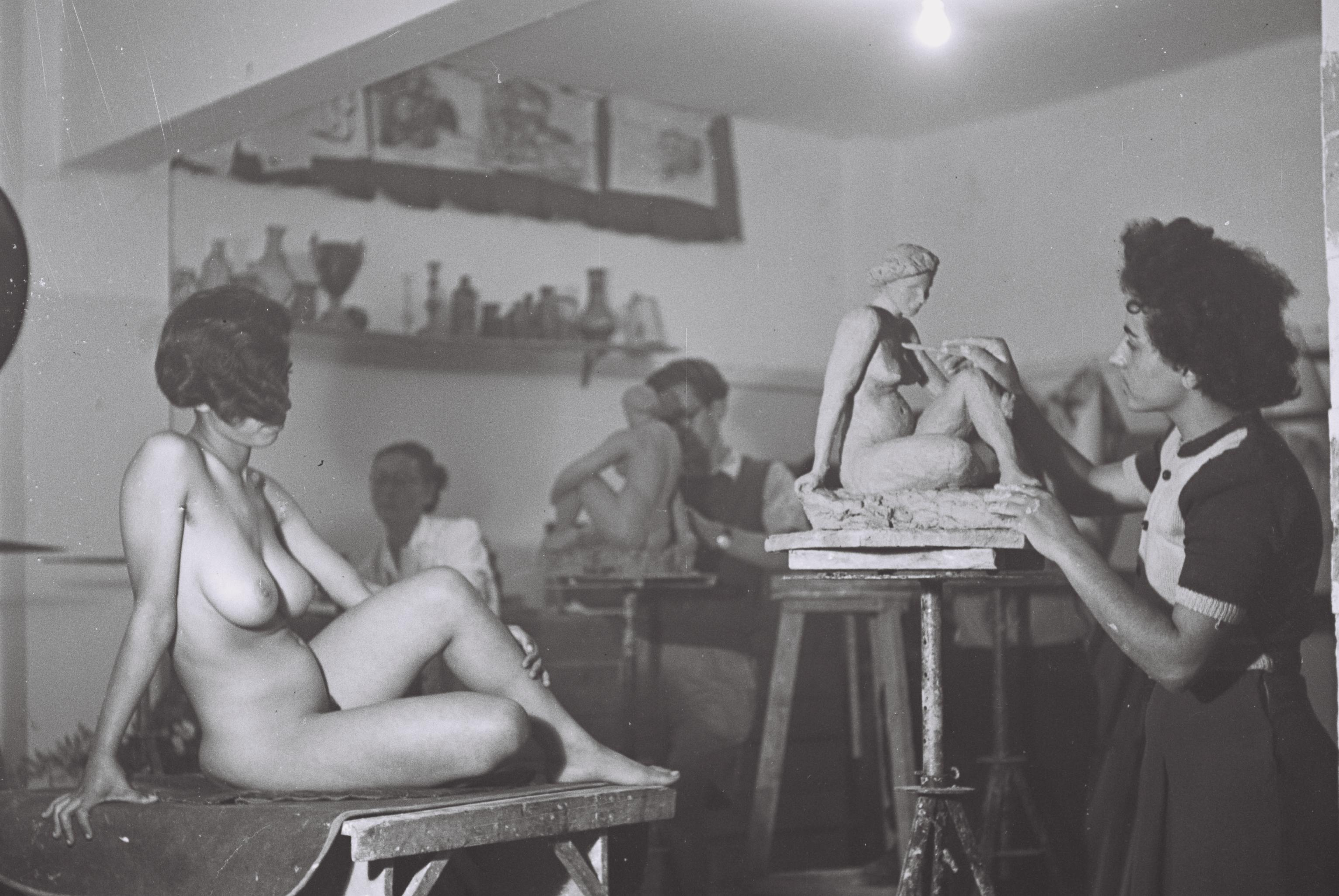
Young artists studying sculpture, 1946

The Avni Institute is located in a complex of buildings on Eilat Street in South Tel Aviv. The buildings are named after the school's leading teachers. On the premises is a large gallery space where students can exhibit their works.

== Notable faculty and alumni ==
=== Faculty ===
- Tuvia Beeri
- Pinchas Cohen Gan
- Yehezkel Streichman
- Avigdor Stematsky
- Yigal Tumarkin
- Zvi Lachman
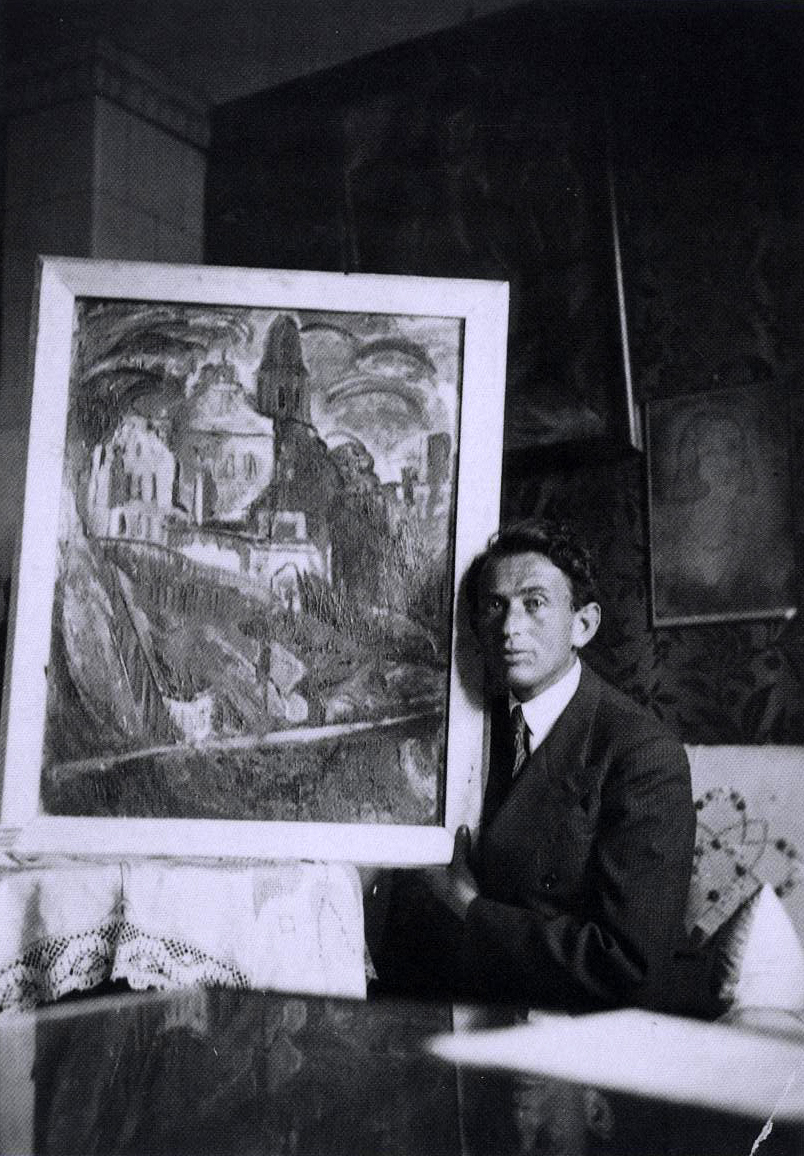
Yehezkel Streichman

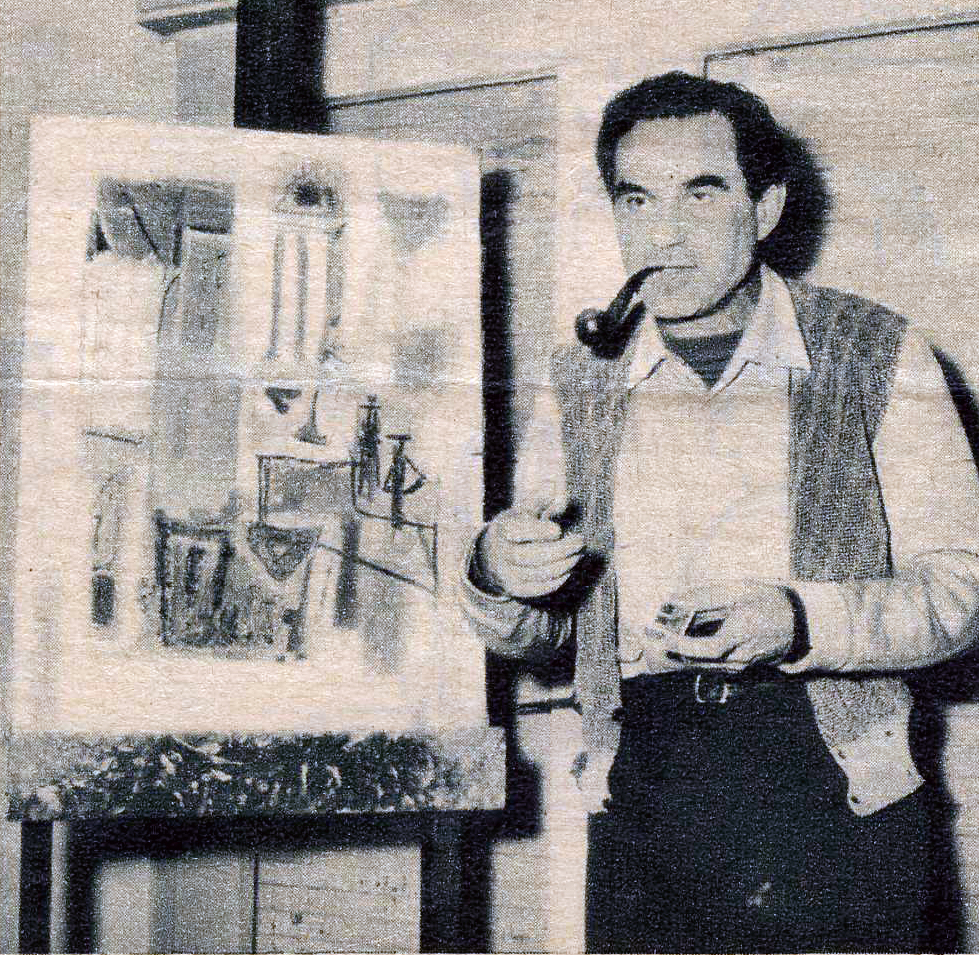
Avigdor Stematsky

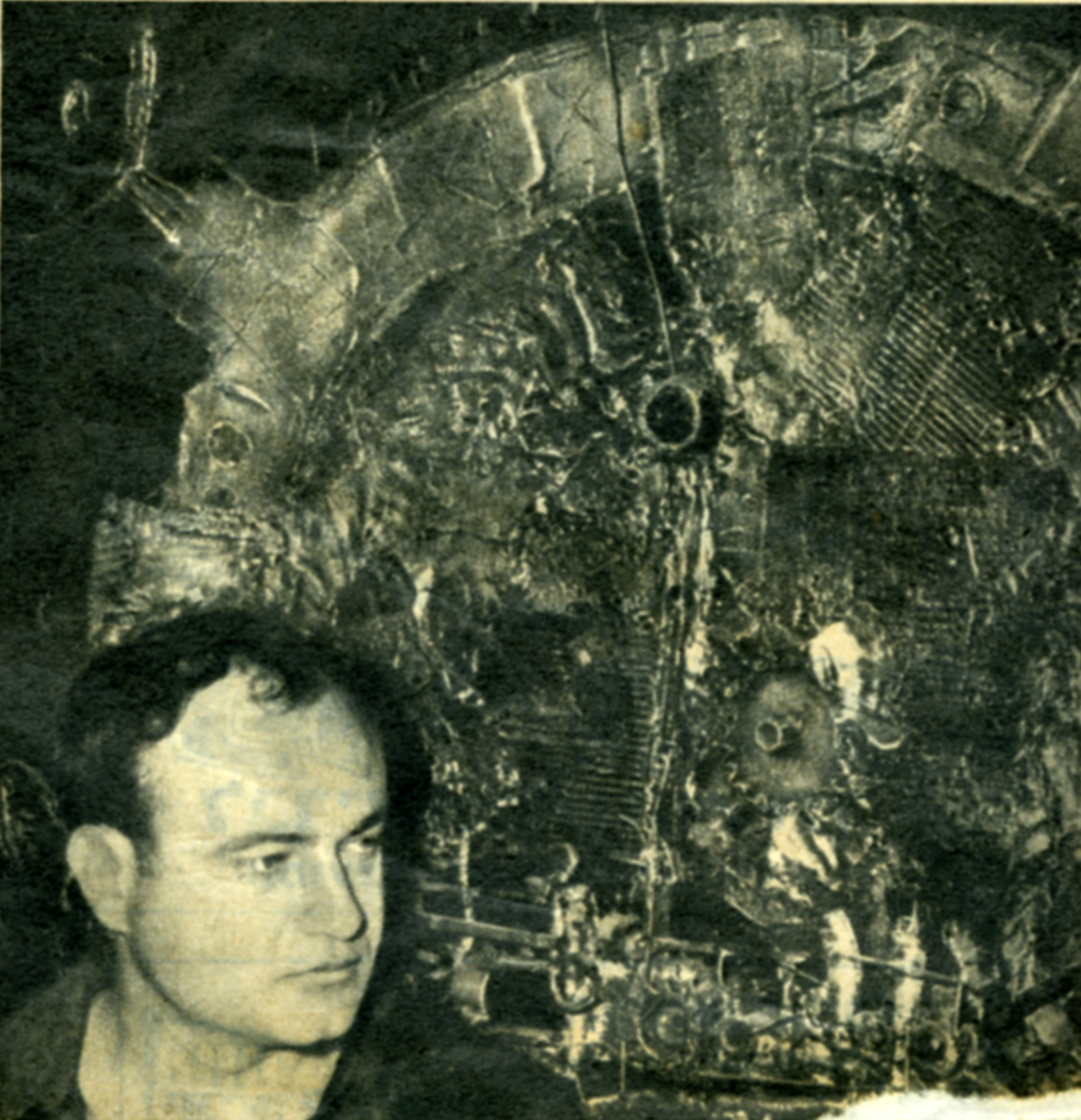
Yigal Tumarkin

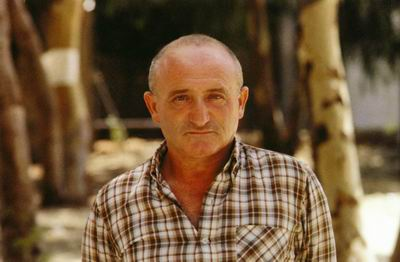
Tuvia Beeri

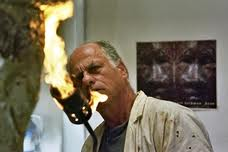
Zvi Lachman

=== Alumni ===
Menashe Kadishman

- Benni Efrat
- Daniel Enkaoua
- Alona Frankel
- Gideon Gechtman
- Moshe Gershuni
- Malvina Kaplan
- Moses Hacmon
- Zvi Hecker
- Menashe Kadishman
- Ram Karmi
- David Leviathan
- Ofer Lellouche
- Rami Meiri
- Avi Schwartz
- Buky Schwartz
- Siona Shimshi
- Itzchak Tarkay
- Yona Wallach
- Boaz Vaadia

== See also ==
- Visual arts in Israel
- Education in Israel
- Art in Tel Aviv
