= Lakhi =

Lakhi may refer to:

- Dafi, also known as Lākhī, village in Razavi Khorasan, Iran
- Lukhi, Fariman, also known as Lākhī, village in Razavi Khorasan, Iran
- Lakhi jungle, a village in Bathinda district, Punjab, India
- Lakhi Jungle (jungle), a historic jungle of Punjab, India
- Lakhi, Sindh, a town in Shikarpur District of Sindh, Pakistan

== See also ==
- Lakha (disambiguation)
