= Itzchak Tarkay =

Israeli artist

- יצחק טרקאי
- Born: 1935; Subotica, Kingdom of Yugoslavia
- Died: June 3, 2012 (aged 76–77); Detroit, Michigan, U.S.
- Known for: Painting; graphic art

Itzchak Tarkay (Hebrew: יצחק טרקאי; 1935 – June 3, 2012) was an Israeli painter and graphic artist. He used trade dress to protect his style from being emulated via Romm Art Creations Ltd. v. Simcha International, Inc., a case that Tarkay won.

== Biography ==
Itzchak Tarkay was born in Subotica, on the Yugoslav-Hungarian border. At the age of 9, Tarkay and his family were sent to the Mauthausen concentration camp by the Nazis until Allied liberation freed them a year later.

In 1949, his family immigrated to Israel and was sent to the transit camp for new arrivals at Be'er Ya'akov. They lived in a kibbutz for several years. In 1951 Tarkay received a scholarship to the Avni Institute of Art and Design, where he studied under the artist Schwartzman and was mentored by important Israeli artists of the time including Moshe Mokady, Marcel Janco, Yehezkel Streichman and Avigdor Stematsky.

Tarkay died in 2012 at the age of 77 in Detroit, where he visited as a guest of Park West Gallery.

== Art career ==
Tarkay worked in acrylic and watercolor. He was also a graphic artist and his rich tapestry of form and color was achieved primarily through the use of the serigraph. In his serigraphs, many colors are laid over one another and used to create texture and transparency. In his later years, Tarkay mentored younger Israeli artists including David Najar, Yuval Wolfson and Mark Kanovich who often visited his studio, worked alongside him and received his critiques. Tarkay was also the only artist to collaborate with Yaacov Agam (1928-2026). He and Agam created two paintings which incorporated both artists' imagery in a single painting.

His art is focused on almost dream images of elegant women, often in pairs. Tarkay's early works, some of which the Israeli art critic Joav BarEl classified as made in the De Staëlian style, were completed by him personally. His later works were drawn by him and then colored in by assisting artists on staff.

Tarkay's art is influenced by French Impressionism, and Post-Impressionism, particularly Matisse and Toulouse-Lautrec.

== Commemoration ==
In the year 2000, his work Reflection was minted by the Israel Coins and Medals Corp. In 2008, he became an honorary citizen of Holon.

== See also ==
- Visual arts in Israel

== Books ==
- Itzchak Tarkay: The Park West Paintings (1994)
- Itzchak Tarkay: Profile of an Artist (1997), ISBN 9781883269197
- Itzchak Tarkay: Tel Aviv Retrospective (2012)
