= Lakhan =

Lakhan may refer to:

- Lakshmana, a principal character in the ancient Indian epic Ramayana, popularly known as Lakhan in Hindi
- Lakhan (film), a 1979 Indian Hindi-language film
- Lakhan, Uttar Pradesh, a village in Muzaffarnagar district

== See also ==
- Lakshman (disambiguation)
- Lakhani (disambiguation)
- Lakhanpur (disambiguation)
