= Avi Schwartz =

Israeli painter (born 1938)

Avi Schwartz אבי שוורץ
- Born: Avi Schwartz; 1938; Bucharest, Romania
- Known for: Painting, oil on canvas

Avi Schwartz (Hebrew: אבי שוורץ; born 1938) is an Israeli painter.

== Biography ==
=== Childhood and adolescence ===
Avi Schwartz was born in Bucharest, Romania, in 1938. His family was in the diamond business. Early in life he absorbed artistic values at home, where the walls were decorated with pictures from his father's rich art collection. The realityle of portraits and scenery was then considered classic, and Avi strived to imitate it. His opportunity came during World War II, while Bucharest was being bombed, and he and his family were forced to remain at home for long periods of time. During those days he copied the pictures he saw before him.

In 1947 his family succeeded in leaving Romania and immigrated to Israel in 1948, via Paris. Here they were met by his grandfather, Moses Josephson, the first president of the Israel Diamond Exchange, who had immigrated to Palestine before the war.

In his youth he studied in the "Shalva High School in Tel Aviv, and with his parents' encouragement he enrolled in the Avni Institute (a college for Art and Design). He was the youngest student there, and was proud to have successfully passed its entrance exams. The Avni Institute was then run by Moshe Mokady, and among its teachers were Yehezkel Streichman, Avigdor Stematsky, and Marcel Janko.

=== The Avni Institute and beyond ===
During this period the prevailing artistic perceptions at the Avni Institute leaned towards abstract art and were in search of a new, modernistic and cosmopolitan language of expression. This was in contradiction to the "old Bezalel art", "tourist paintings" and realism that imitated what the eye saw. In the Avni institute Avi became exposed to abstract expressionism, to an approach which considered art to be an intuitive medium for the expression of feelings, reflecting fantasy and the subconscious, etc. According to this view, realistic painting had reached its summit, and had thus come to an end. The process of study at the Institute consisted of basic, primary guidance during the lesson, emphasizing work at home - work by trial and error, then standing up to critique in class. Schwartz did not relate well to these methods, nor to the artistic language of Steimatzky or Streichman and Janco, who belonged to the group called "New Horizons". He was looking for "the real thing" according to him, figurative painting. This lack of communication between him and his teachers led to an "arid period", during which he ceased to paint.

When the Sinai Campaign broke out, Avi left the Avni Institute and his high school and enlisted in the army, the IDF. Later he married Nurit, finished his matriculation exams, and for a short period studied history in the Tel Aviv University. To make a living he worked in diamond polishing and later managed the diamond, precious stone and metalworking department in the Ramat Gan ORT School.

He began painting again only at the age of 30, when he met the artist Zvi Shorr, who told him that "the world is not abstract, and no painting should be abstract - paint the world as you see it". Zvi Schor had been exposed to modern art and French Expressionism, and had even lived for some time in Paris. Despite this, his paintings remained descriptive and realistic, made by impressionistic movements of the paintbrush, inspired by the paintings of Edgar Degas, Paul Cézanne and others. Avi Schwartz was very much influenced by him, and was considered "the direct disciple of Zvi Schor".

=== Back to the art world ===
Schwartz also studied art with Professor Schwartzman, but was most influenced by two artists who became his "masters"- Shimshon Holzman and Arieh Lubin. Holzman was identified with the artists of the Paris School, and became known as an outstanding aquarelle painter. Aryeh Lubin was influenced by Cézanne, and painted illuminated Safad synagogues, vendors in the Tiberias marketplace, and Arabic characters in cafes.

The friendship that developed between Schwartz, Holzman and Lubin, led to regular meetings, during which the three of them sometimes traveled to the markets of Ramle and Lod, but mostly worked and painted together in cafes and at the Jaffa seafront. They were joined at times by Nachum Gutman.

In 1979 Holzman invited Schwartz to Paris to join the workshops that were being held in the famous art school, the "Académie de la Grande Chaumière", and he complied.

=== Style characteristics ===
Zvi Shorr, whose personality was formed by European culture, was very pedantic with his pupil Avi Schwartz about the use of colors in his paintings –mainly burnt Sienna, Prussian blue, and ochre yellow. On the other hand, Holzman and Lubin exposed him to other color options, emphasizing Israeli sunlight and sharp contrasts. Schwartz incorporated their teaching into his art, and like them was inspired by the sights and experiences he absorbed outside the studio. His works are deeply connected to the viewed object (landscapes, figures, etc.), permeating urban reality, Jaffa neighborhoods, its coffee shops, sea and port, etc. Schwartz' paintings deal with the figurative representation of space, showing figures drawn on site, catching immediate impressions, focusing especially on characters from the marginal strata of society: unfortunate people at rest or at work. Even though his works deal with social themes, it must be emphasized that they do not express any political or socially subversive stand. His subjects are not drawn as a protest against the social wrongs perpetrated against them by the ruling powers, or even to show their "miserable existence". Schwartz observes his subjects, and translates what he sees from his very personal viewpoint to the canvas. He "maps out" his figures as viewed from some distance, without being an integral part of the scene.

== Solo exhibitions ==
- 1972 – Champs Elysee, Johannesburg, South Africa
- 1974 – Israelis Gallery, Tel Aviv
- 1976 – Art Sanctuary, Holon
- 1978 – "Ten Years of Creativity" - Yad Lebanim Museum, Petach Tikvah
- 1979 - Ramat Hasharon Gallery
- 1981, 1986, 1988 – Weizman Gallery, Beer Sheva
- 1984 – Uri and Rami Nehushtan Museum, Ashdot Yaakov
- 1985 – "Miniatures", Kontiki Gallery, Caracas, Venezuela
- 1986, 1988, 1995 – Meir Art Gallery, Raanana
- 1987 – Gallery 13.5, Jaffa, Tel Aviv
- 1993 – Gevanim Gallery, Panorama Hotel, Haifa
- 1994 – Princess Hotel Gallery, Eilat
- 2006 – Zaritsky Artists House, Tel Aviv
- 2009 – Kings Gallery, Jerusalem

== Group exhibitions ==
- 1972, 1995 – Yad Lebanim Museum, Petach Tikvah
- 1974 – Israeli Artists in the President's Residence, Jerusalem
- 1974, 1975, 1984 – Tel Aviv Artists, Zaritsky Artists House, Tel Aviv
- 1976 – Israeli Artists, Montreal, Quebec, Canada
- 1977 – The First "Autumn Art Salon", ZOA House, Tel Aviv
- 1979 – "Spring Salon", Israeli Artists in Zürich, Switzerland
- 1986, 1988 – Selected Israeli Artists, Düsseldorf; Berlin, Germany
- 1990, 2004 – Art Expo, New York City; Los Angeles, U.S.A.
- 1991 – "International Art Show", Tokyo, Japan

- Beit Eli Municipal Gallery, Ashkelon

- 1997, 1999 – Bible House Museum, Tel Aviv
- 1997 – "Miniatures", Beit Abba Hushi, Haifa

- Union of Artists and Sculptors House, Ramat Gan

- 1998 – "Landscapes", The Library Gallery, Giv'atayim
- 2000 – The Land of Israel Museum, Tel Aviv

- The Chagall Artists House, Haifa

- 2000, 2004, - Artists House, Petach Tikvah
- 2003 – Culture Palace, Petach Tikvah
- 2004 – Kings Gallery, Jerusalem
