= Lakhanpur =

Lakhanpur may refer to:

- Lucknow, formerly known as Lakhanpur
- Lakhanpur, Jammu, India
- Lakhanpur, Janakpur, Nepal
- Lakhanpur, Mechi, Nepal
- Lakhanpur, Narayani, Nepal
- Lakhanpur, Budaun, Uttar Pradesh, India
- Lakhanpur, Orissa, India

== See also ==
- Lakhan (disambiguation)
- Pur (disambiguation)
