= Daniel Enkaoua =

French painter

- דניאל אנקאוע
- Born: 1962 (age 63–64)
- Occupation: Artist

Daniel Enkaoua (Hebrew: דניאל אנקאוע; born 1962) is an artist born in France, currently residing in Barcelona.

== Biography ==
Enkaoua was born in Meaux in the Île-de-France, where he attended a number of Jewish religious schools. This led him to consider a vocation in religion but, after moving to Israel in 1981, he took up art, studying at the Avni Institute of Art in Tel Aviv, graduating in 1989.

In 1991 Enkaoua was included in the seminal exhibition Israel Now - An Extensive Presentation, alongside other younger generation Israeli artists, at the Tel Aviv Museum of Art. Further group exhibitions took place in Israel, at the Israel Museum, Jerusalem, in 1992, and the Museum of Art in Herzliya in 1994. Enkaoua's first solo show took place at Marlborough Fine Art, London, in 1996, and this was followed by a solo show at Golconda Fine Art in Tel Aviv in 1998, the Marlborough Gallery, New York, in 2003, and three shows at the contemporary realist gallery in Amsterdam, Galerie Mokum, in 2005, 2010 and 2011. Enkaoua has also shown in Germany, Denmark and Spain, and in 2007 he took part in a group show in Austria to celebrate the life of the Israeli politician Teddy Kollek, held at the Charim Galerie, Vienna. In 2010 his painting of his four-year-old son, Natan, was exhibited at the BP Portrait Award exhibition at the National Portrait Gallery, London, where it was voted the most popular painting in the show by the visiting public.

One of his paintings, an image of a young girl, forms the centrepiece for a celebrated private gallery and house designed by Paul de Ruiter for the art collectors Cees Röling and Saar Sparnaay in the Dutch town of Rhenen.

In 2004 Enkaoua moved to Barcelona, where he now lives with his wife and four children.

== Style and influences ==
Daniel Enkaoua's paintings are figurative, often taking the form of portraits, with some still lives. His paintings are stark in terms of the placing of a figure or object centrally on the canvas, in a neutral setting with little if any background. The colour palette is restricted, but they are not harsh images, primarily due to Enkaoua's technique of applying the paint in "taches" which create shimmering surfaces rather than harsh blocks of form and colour. This creates a duality in the paintings so they are animated in the way the paint is applied but also static, in a state which one critic described favourably as 'an oppressive stasis and gravity.'

Any potential harshness is also undercut by his subject matter, which often includes images of children, who can appear almost vulnerable in the plain settings of the paintings. George Hollander writes of this: 'The painting creates a stage, perhaps by the way it involves no other person but those two, except of course the painter who is also the father. All the disturbing intimacy of theatre is present.' This sense of intimacy has also been described as a highly poetic relationship between the artist, the viewer and the subject of the paintings, with the Curator of Painting & Sculpture at Denver Art Museum, Timothy J. Standring, writing of Enkaoua's paintings: 'They reveal the tonality, lighting, and palette that—he has discovered—succeed and that fulfill that poetic dimension.'

This quality in Enkaoua's still life paintings, been also compared to the technique of Chardin.

Earlier in his career Enkaoua also painted landscapes, including a series of landscapes of Israel in 1993. Exhibited at Golconda Fine Art in Tel Aviv in 1998, these were described by the art critic Ariel P. Hirschfeld as 'masterpieces of Israeli landscape painting, which has all the appearance of being the greatest landscape ever painted here.' According to Hirschfeld the method Enkaoua employs is impressionist, 'not in technique but in the acute perception that is all a matter of sensation, unprejudiced by knowledge.'
