= Lachmann =

- Pronunciation: German: [ˈlaxman]
- Language: German

Origin
- Language: Middle High German
- Origin: lache + mann
- Meaning: 'man living near a pond'

Other names
- Alternative spelling: Lachman
- Anglicisation: Lackman

Lachmann (also Lachman, Lachemann, Lackman, or Lackmann) is a family name of German origin. Notable people with the surname include:

== Lachmann ==
- Clara Lachmann (1864–1920), Danish-Swedish patron of the arts
- Erich Lachmann (1909–1972), Nazi SS officer at Sobibor extermination camp
- Esther Lachmann, later Pauline Thérèse Lachmann, later Mme Villoing, later Mme la Marquise de Païva, later Countess Henckel von Donnersmarck, courtesan
- Georges Lachmann, World War I flying ace and General officer
- Gustav Lachmann, engineer
- Hans Lachmann-Mosse, publisher
- Karl Lachmann, classic philologist, Germanist
- Ludwig Lachmann, Austrian economist
- Peter Lachmann, British immunologist and nephew of Robert Lachmann
- Richard Lachmann, American political scientist and international relations theorist.
- Robert Lachmann, German ethnomusicologist and musicologist

== Lachman ==
- Darryl Lachman (born 1989), Curaçaoan professional footballer
- Dichen Lachman (born 1982), Australian actress and model
- Gary Lachman (born 1955), American musician and writer
- Harry Lachman (1886–1975), American artist, set designer, and film director
- Irwin Lachman (1930–2025), American engineer
- Patrick Lachman (born 1970), American heavy metal guitarist and vocalist
- Seymour P. Lachman (1933–2025), New York politician and historian
- Zvi Lachman (born 1950), Israeli sculptor and educator
- Lachman test (Lachman maneuver)

== Lachemann ==
- Bill Lachemann (1934–2024), American baseball coach
- Marcel Lachemann (born 1941), American baseball executive and former player, manager, and coach
- Rene Lachemann (born 1945), American baseball coach, player and manager

== Lackman ==
- Anne Lackman, Finnish backstroke swimmer
- Rick Lackman, American football player
- Susan Cohn Lackman, American composer
- J. Leonard Lackman House, Cohoes, New York

== Lackmann ==
- Max Lackmann, German theologian
