= Joav BarEl =

Israeli artist (1933–1977)

- Born: יואב בראל; January 28, 1933; Tel Aviv, Mandatory Palestine
- Died: 1977; Tel Aviv, Israel
- Education: Avni Institute of Art and Design, Tel Aviv University
- Known for: Painting, Conceptual Art, Criticism

Joav BarEl (also Yoav Bar-El), (Hebrew: יואב בראל; January 28, 1933–1977) was an Israeli artist, critic, and lecturer.

== Biography ==
Joav BarEl was born in Tel Aviv, Mandatory Palestine, to Aharon (“Aharonchik”) Elkind and Shlomit Cohen Tzedek. He had a younger sister, Mirana Barel-Blay (b. 1939), and a younger half-brother, Joel BarEl, from his father's second marriage. His father was a lifeguard at Tel Aviv beaches and his mother was among the founders of HaBima Theater. His interest in music was evident from a young age. He began playing the accordion in his teens.

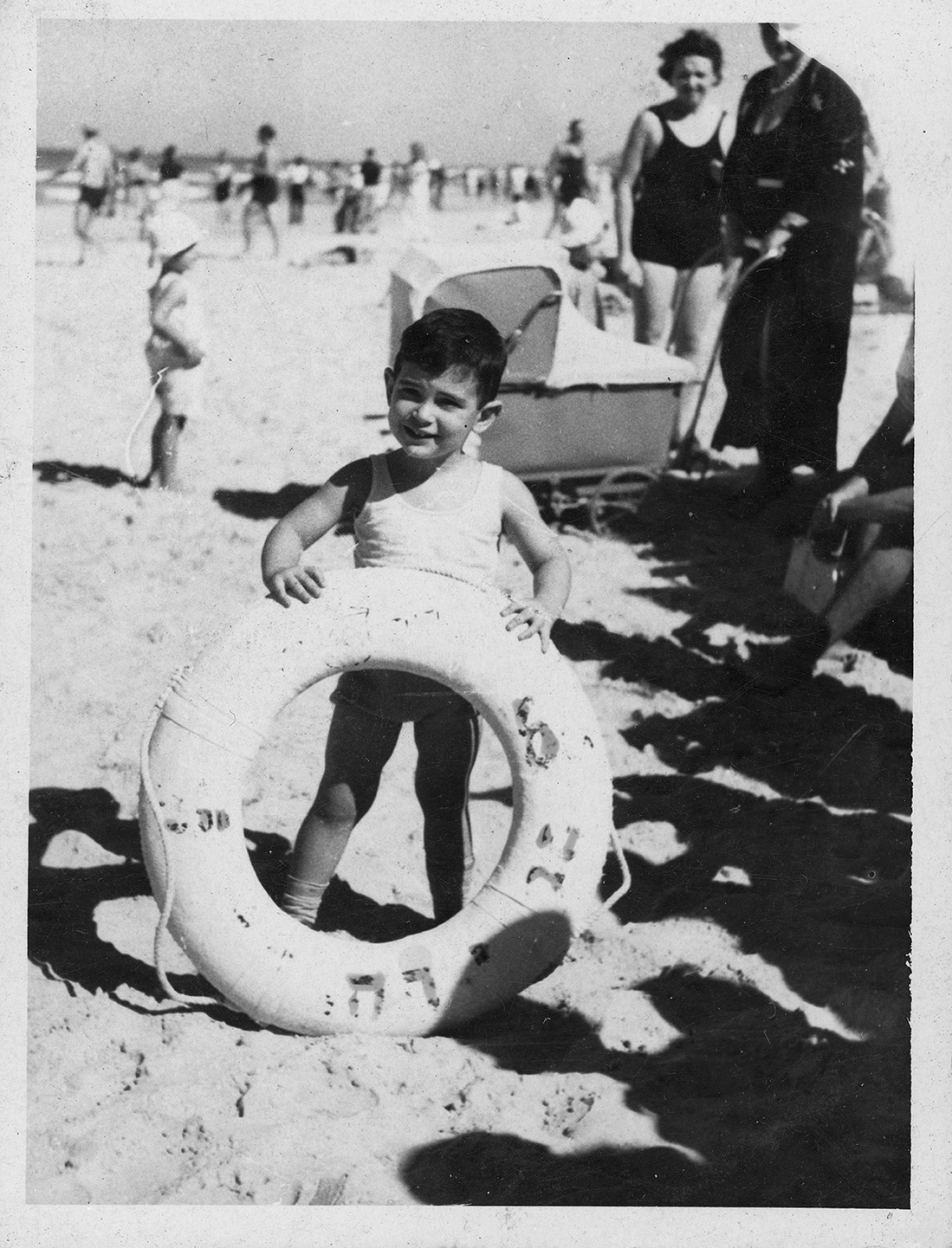
Joav BarEl as a child on the beach in Tel-Aviv, Israel

In his senior year of high school, BarEl enrolled in a training program of the IDF Air Force, in which he studied aircraft mechanics in the US. He served as a maintenance officer in the Air Force and later held the same position in TWA for a few years. During his training in the US, BarEl attended lectures given by the composer Arnold Schoenberg. After completing his military service, he was admitted to study composition and conducting but did not complete his training. Nevertheless, he maintained an interest in classical, popular, and avant-garde music throughout his life.

In 1954, BarEl began art studies at The Avni Institute of Art and Design and moved into a studio in Tel Aviv that doubled as his home. His studio, and the café he frequented, became a gathering place for artists, poets, and writers, among them David Avidan, Yair Hurvitz, Aviva Uri, Prof. Gabriel Moked, Prof. Menachem Peri, Yona Wallach, Jacques Mory-Katmor, Ami Shavit, Benni Efrat, and others.

From 1964 to 1968, BarEl studied psychology and philosophy at Tel Aviv University, focusing on aesthetics and psychology in art. Subsequently, he began a master's degree in clinical psychology, graduating in 1969.

He was interested in Eastern philosophy, primarily in Zen-Buddhism, and in Japanese calligraphy and meditation. He was also an enthusiastic reader of science fiction and was generally interested in altered states of consciousness, which led to his participation in studies on psychedelic drugs conducted at the time by the Ministry of Health.

Joav BarEl died of heart disease in 1977, at the age of 44.

== Art career ==
BarEl's early art was influenced by European abstract art. His work was eclectic: expressionist oil paintings, a series of paintings and drawings on paper inspired by Franz Kafka’s stories (1958–1960), abstract stone and plaster reliefs, and zen-inspired ink drawings.

In 1967- 1970, BarEl produced acrylic paintings, collages, and photographic transfer works influenced by American pop art, using magazine photographs and advertisements as his source. He used industrial spray paint and bright complementary colors. His painting Kennedy Assassination, 1968, was first shown at the "Political" exhibition organized by the 10+ Group in Tel Aviv and was criticized for its overtly political nature. It was later shown at the Israeli gallery Tempo Rubato (2014) and was included in the Tate Modern exhibition "The World Goes Pop" in 2015–2016.

BarEl was also one of the first practitioners of conceptual art in Israel. Starting in 1969, he produced conceptual sculptural works and kept a “Book of Ideas”—a notebook in which he wrote suggestions for different projects he invited fellow artists to execute or work on himself.

BarEl was also active as an art critic and lecturer. In 1959, he began publishing articles and reviews in influential forums. He was the art critic for the daily newspapers Yedioth Ahronoth (1959–61) and Ha’aretz (1959–69) and for the radio stations Kol Israel (1964–69) and the IDF Radio (1967–71). Between 1965 and 1971, he was editor of the art section in “Achshav” (“Now”) Magazine.

BarEl organized and served as an adviser for exhibitions of contemporary Israeli artists, among them the 10+ Group exhibitions. The 10+ Group, led by Raffi Lavie, was a group of young artists seeking to “shake up” what they saw as the stagnant Israeli art scene, which was dominated by the lyrical abstraction of the New Horizons group. Their guiding principle was the idea of “doing things differently,” by aiming to transcend the artists’ individual styles through collaboration and non-conventional exhibitions. In addition to his participation in some of the group's exhibitions, BarEl promoted their agenda in his writings.

In addition, BarEl served as an artistic advisor to The Israeli Television, the public TV network, for the weekly culture magazine “Kla’im” (1969–1970), and for several educational films about art and culture, for which he also wrote some of the scripts (1970–1972). Another influential position he held was as a teacher in the Technion – Israel Institute of Technology, Haifa, where between 1971 and 1977 he taught three-dimensional design in the Department of Architecture and Town Planning, in collaboration with Yitzhak Danziger.

== Legacy ==
A collection of his work is held at the Information Center for Israeli Art in the Israel Museum, Jerusalem, and in the BarEl-Baly family collections.

In October 2004, a retrospective exhibition of BarEl's work was held at the Tel Aviv Museum of Art. The museum also published a selection of his critical, pedagogical, and theoretical writings in Between Sobriety and Innocence – On Plastic Arts in the 1960s in Tel Aviv (2004).

BarEl had planned to establish a fund for the research and development of contemporary art. His idea inspired the establishment of the Mevo’ot Fund in 2021. The fund was initiated by Joel BarEl, Mirana BarEl (Joav's sister) and her husband Ami Blay, and their close friend Ami Steinitz, as well as by Shiraz Grinbaum-BarEl and Michal Vaknin. The fund seeks to promote contemporary artistic actions inspired by BarEl's life work, create diverse spaces for discourse about and with art, and make BarEl's work accessible for future generations.

== Teaching ==
- 1962–1963 Avni Institute of Art and Design in Tel Aviv
- 1965 Seminar for high school art supervisors, Ministry of Education, Jerusalem, Israel
- 1966 Tel Aviv University, seminar on the “Concept of Art“
- 1967 Advanced seminar for art teachers, Ministry of Education, Tel Aviv, Israel
- 1967–1971 Margoshilski School for Drawing, Tel Aviv
- 1970 Seminar on “Concept of Art“ for kibbutz artists, Petah Tikva, Israel
- 1971–1977 Technion – Israel Institute of Technology, Haifa; Three-dimensional design in the Department of Architecture and Town Planning

== Solo exhibitions ==
- 1958 Chemerinsky Gallery, Tel Aviv, Israel
- 1960 Chemerinsky Gallery, Tel Aviv, Israel
- 1969 Gordon Gallery, Tel Aviv, Israel
- 1981 Memory Exhibition, Shinar Gallery, Tel Aviv, Israel
- 1987 “Joav BarEl,” Kalisher 5 Gallery, Tel Aviv, Israel
- 2004–2005 “Joav BarEl Retrospective,” curator: Irith Hadar, Tel Aviv Museum of Art, Israel
- 2012 Drawings for Kafka, Tempo Rubato, Tel Aviv, Israel
- 2014 “Pop Works,” Tempo Rubato, Tel Aviv, Israel
- 2014 Joav BarEl, Frieze New York, Frame section, NY, USA Center of the World, Tempo Rubato, Tel Aviv^{[2]}

== Group exhibitions ==
- 1957 “HaYeled” (The Child), Zuta Gallery, Tel Aviv, Israel
- 1958 “The Art of Tomorrow,” Haifa Museum of Art, Israel
- 1959 “Young Artists,” Artists’ Association, Tel Aviv, Israel

“First Biennale of Young Artists,” Paris, France

“The Bonfire Club,” Tel Aviv

- 1961 “Spring Exhibition,” Rina Gallery, Jerusalem, Israel

“Fall Exhibition,” Rina Gallery, Jerusalem, Israel

Yehudit Gallery, Tel Aviv, Israel

- 1964 “Five Artists,” Rina Gallery, Jerusalem, Israel

“Contemporary Art,“ Beit Katz, Acre, Israel

- 1965 “Fall exhibition“, Tel Aviv Museum of Art, Israel

“Five Young Artists,” Hanegev Museum, Beersheba, Israel

“Fall Exhibition,” Malia (Kahana) Gallery, Tel Aviv, Israel

“Drawing 1965” (תשכ"ו), Haifa Museum of Art, Israel

- 1966 “Fall exhibition,“ Tel Aviv Museum of Art, Israel

“The Flower,” 10+ Group, Massada Gallery, Tel Aviv, Israel

“Fall Exhibition,” Malia (Kahana) Gallery, Tel Aviv Israel

- 1967 “Winter Exhibition,” the Artists and Sculptures Association, Tel Aviv

“In Red,” 10+ Group, Katz Gallery, Tel Aviv, Israel

“Spring Exhibition,” Gordon Gallery, Tel Aviv

“The Nude,” 10+ Group, Gordon Gallery, Tel Aviv, Israel

- 1968 “Summer Exhibition,“ Gordon Gallery, Tel Aviv, Israel

“Fall Exhibition“, Tel Aviv Museum of Art, Israel

“Pro and Con,” 10+ Group, 220 Gallery, Tel Aviv

“Artists of Tel Aviv,” Tel Aviv Museum of Art, in collaboration with the Artists’ Association, Israel

- 1969 “In a Circle,” 10+ Group, Gordon Gallery, Tel Aviv, Israel

“Stop, Green,“ Artists’ Pavilion, Jerusalem, Israel

- 1970 “Five Rooms,“ Artists’ Pavilion, Jerusalem, Israel

A selection of Israeli Art, Gan Ha'em, Haifa, Israel

- 1971 Opening exhibition of the new building, Tel Aviv Museum of Art
- 1972 “Conceptual Art,” Artists’ Association, Alharizi Pavilion, Tel Aviv, Israel
- 2015–2016 “The World Goes Pop,” Tate Modern, London, UK

== Selected monographs / publications on Joav BarEl ==
- 1997 Drawings After Kafka, with texts by Ami Steinitz, Yoram Bronowski, Gavriel Moked, Published by Mirana BarEl-Blay and Ami Blay, ISBN 965-222-759-5
- 2004 Joav BarEl, exhibition catalogue, Tel Aviv Museum of Art, Israel, with texts by Mordechai Omer, Gabriel Moked, Irith Hadar, Joav BarEl, Adam Tennenbaum, and a conversation between Rafi Lavie and Yona Fischer, ISBN 965-7161-16-9
- 2004 Between Sobriety and Innocence – on Plastic Arts in the 1960s in Tel Aviv, a collection of critical essays by Joav BarEl, edited by Mordechai Omer, ISBN 965-7161-18-5

== See also ==
- Visual arts in Israel
