= Lakshmanan =

Lakshmanan is a common Indian name that may refer to:

- Lakshmana, the brother of Rama in the ancient Indian epic Ramayana
- A. R. Lakshmanan, former judge of the Supreme Court of India
- C. K. Lakshmanan, British-Indian Olympian
- G. Lakshmanan, Indian politician
- S. Lakshmanan, Indian politician
- Lakshmanan Sathyavagiswaran, former Chief Medical Examiner-Coroner for the County of Los Angeles
- Savithri Lakshmanan, Indian politician
- V. K. Lakshmanan, Indian politician

== See also ==
- Lakshman (disambiguation)
