= Lakha =

Lakha may refer to:

- Lakha language, a Southern Tibetic language spoken in central Bhutan
- Lakha of Mewar, the third Maharana of the Mewar Kingdom
- Lakha, a 1997 Bollywood film
- Lakho, a Sindhi tribe or community
- Lakha Khan, Indian musical artist

== See also ==
- Lakhi (disambiguation)
- Lakshman (disambiguation)
- Lakh, 100,000 in the Indian numbering system
