= Lakhani =

Lakhani may refer to:

- Lakhani (surname), found in Gujarat, India, and among people from Sindh, meaning "(descendant) of Lakh"
- Lakhani, Punjab, a town in the Punjab Province of Pakistan
- Lakhani, Maharashtra, a town in the Maharashtra state, Bhandara District

== See also ==
- Lakhan (disambiguation)
