= David Leviathan =

Israeli painter, sculptor, and poet (born 1950)

- Born: 6 August 1950 (age 75); Givat Brenner, Israel
- Known for: painting, drawing, sculpture, poetry
- Website: leviathandavid.com

David Leviathan (Hebrew: דוד לוי תן; born 6 August 1950) is an Israeli painter, sculptor, and poet.

== Biography ==
David Leviathan was born and grew up in Kibbutz Givat Brenner in Israel. Right after completing his military service, in the year 1972, he attended the Avni Institute of Fine Arts. During his studies there, he became an assistant of his teacher – master, the artist Yehezkel Streichman, and later on he was teaching there himself.

In the year 1977 he gave up painting and for the next two years was occupied with trying to compare the monthly cycle in women to cycles in nature, by creating different kinds of 3-dimensional objects.

Towards the end of 1979, he moved to Amsterdam, and while being touched by the book The Fall, written by Albert Camus, he composed oil paintings trying to deal with Camus thoughts, and thus titled his first one-man show in Amsterdam, "The Fall".

During the following years, while using the Four Elements (Air, Water, Fire & Earth) as a major theme for his abstracts and Human Heads (some of them painted on huge canvases, like 350x300 cm` and similar), he used to spend two weeks every year (1981–1989) on a Greek island (each year on a different one), letting a donkey carry his equipment while travelling, to achieve a greater perspective for developing his work, relating those Vibrant Elements and Heads.

In the year 1992, Leviathan received Dutch citizenship, and the next two years he was travelling between Amsterdam and Paris, living and working in them both. He moved back (temporarily?) to Israel to create, and the white color started taking a major part in his work.

A major motif in his work is questioning death within the cyclicality of Life and Death, in which he uses a lot of images of old women, devoting special attention to their facial expressions, and in many cases befogging the images, trying to comprehend as deep as possible spiritual feeling, to create a certain type of atmosphere, and, in some cases it is the tension point between coming to fruition and withering.

== Selected exhibitions ==
=== Solo exhibitions ===
- 1978 – Sara Levi Gallery, Tel Aviv
- 1979 – "The Third Floor Gallery", Jaffa
- 1979 – "New gallery", Tel Aviv
- 1980 – Galerie "Artes", Amsterdam
- 1986 – Galerie "De Looier", Amsterdam
- 1989 – Sara Levi gallery, Tel Aviv
- 1991 – Galerie Witteveen, Amsterdam
- 1991 – Smith Andersen Gallery, Palo Alto, California
- 1991 – "De Gele Rijder" Kunst centrum, Arnhem
- 1992 – "The Work Shop", Paris
- 1992 – Museum "De Librije", Zwolle, Netherlands
- 1995 – Horace Richter gallery, Jaffa
- 1999 – Tel Aviv Performing Art Center
- 1999 – Givaataim Theatre (Tel Aviv)
- 2000 – Horace Richter gallery, Jaffa
- 2003 – "Artists Residence House", Herzlia, Israel
- 2006 – Düsseldorf cultural department, (Germany)
- 2010 – "Artists residence House", Hadera, Israel

=== Group shows ===
- 1977 – The Jerusalem Theatre gallery
- 1977, 1978 – Tel Aviv Museum, – winners of the AICF
- 1977 – Haifa Museum
- 1992 – "Le Genie De La Bastille", Paris
- 1993 – Le Grand Palais, Paris, Biannual "group 109"
- 1993 – "Art International", Amsterdam and Tilburg
- 2004 – "Salon Des Artistes Indepandants", L`espace D`auteuil, Paris
- 2004 – "Salon International, M.C.A, Cannes, France
- 2004 – "Alternative gallery", Jaffa
- 2006 – Wilfried Museum, Hazorea, Israel
- 2013 – Salon "Business Art", Paris

== Scholarships and grants ==
- 1975–1978 – Material scholarship from AICF
- 1979 – Scholarship, Israeli Ministry of Education and Culture
- 1987–1988 – material scholarship, Netherlands Ministry of Education and culture
- 1989 – Werkbeurs (grant), Amsterdam municipality
- 1989 – Presentation beurs, "Stichting Fonds Voor Beeldende Kunsten, Vormgeving En Bouwkunst, Netherlands
- 1991 – Werkbeurs, Amsterdam municipality, the Cultural department
- 1992–1993 – Werkbeurs, "Stichting Fonds Voor Beeldende Kunsten, Vormgeving En Bouwkunst", Netherlands
- 1993 – Presentatie beurs, "Prins Bernard Fonds", Amsterdam
- 1993–1994 – Werkbeurs, "Stichting Fonds Voor Beeldende kunsten, Vormgeving en Bouwkunst", Netherlands

== See also ==
- Visual arts in Israel
