= Tuvia Beeri =

Czech-Israeli painter (1929–2022)

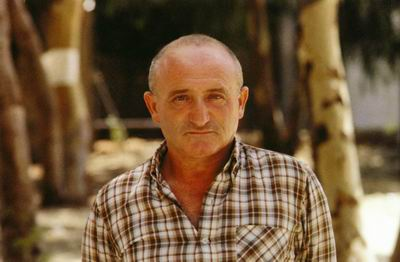
Tuvia Beeri

Tuvia Beeri (Hebrew: טוביה בארי; August 29, 1929, Czechoslovakia, Topoľčany – May 2022) was a Slovak-Israeli painter.

Beeri immigrated to Israel in 1948. He studied in 1957 at the Oranim Art Institute in Qiryat Tivon, with Marcel Janco and Yaakov Wexler and from 1961 to 1963 with Johnny Friedlaender at the École des Beaux-Arts in Paris. In 1963 he returned to Israel to teach at the Bezalel Academy of Art and Design in Jerusalem and from 1964 was also etching at the Avni Institute in Tel Aviv.

In 2001 he won the Eli Oshorov Prize for contribution to Israeli Art from the Israeli Painters and Sculptors Association (IPSA).

== Selected collections ==
- Israel Museum, Jerusalem
- Tel Aviv Museum of Art
