= Lakhan, Uttar Pradesh =

Coordinates: 28°42′N 77°36′E

Lakhan is a village in Dhaulana Tehsil of the Hapur District in Uttar Pradesh, India. As of the 2011 census, Lakhan had a population of 2,696. The literacy rate was 75.84% which is higher than the Uttar Pradesh state average of 67.68%.

It is famous for the 'Bhawan Wali Mata Mandir', which is dedicated to Goddess Durga.
