= Malvina Kaplan =

Israeli painter

Malvina Kaplan מלבינה קפלן
- Born: 1913; Lodz, Poland
- Died: 1987 (aged 73–74); Tel Aviv, Israel
- Known for: Painting
- Style: Abstract, figurative, Polish Impressionism
- Spouse: Moshe

Malvina Kaplan (Hebrew: מלבינה קפלן; 1913–1987), was an Israeli painter.

== Life in Europe ==
Malvina Kaplan (née Kaminer) was born in Lodz, Poland into a religious family. Though her family was religious, they still supported her artistic endeavours. Thus, as a child, Kaplan was tutored in the home of a local Polish painter. Following her artistic passion, she enrolled in the year 1937 in the Warsaw Academy of Art; however, due to the circumstances surrounding the eruption of the Second World War, she was forced to leave her studies. In 1940, she married Moshe Kaplan. Both, due to their Judaism, were sent by Nazi Germany to the Czestochowa ghetto, from whence the pair managed to escape before the destruction and anhelation of the ghetto. The Kaplans left for Germany using counterfeit Polish identities. There, they were employed in factory work as well as agricultural work.

However, in 1944, Malvina's Jewish identity was revealed, and she was subsequently deported to the Auschwitz concentration camp before being transported to Ravensbruck and then to Malchow.

Malvina was saved from almost assured death thanks to Count Bernadotte, who initiated a rescue operation that saved her along with 11 other Jews. Following this operation, she was taken to Sweden. There, the count reintroduced her to cultured life so that she may "learn to smile again". In Sweden, she worked in a studio of functional art, and there found and reunited with her husband. In 1947, following the end of WW2, the couple made Aliya to the Erez Israel.

== In Israel ==
Malvina, striving to free herself from the Polish Impressionism on which she grew, decided to enroll in the Avni Art Institute in Tel Aviv. She later joined the Israeli Union of Painters and Sculptors.

At first, her works were rather figurative and consisted of impressions of the desert she encountered in this new land. These dynamic paintings imbued in them an array of reds and yellows. Although rather figurative, her tendency toward abstract art was already revealed.

In the 1960s, Kaplan started working on collages. Kaplan held several solo exhibitions in which she presented her collages. In the 1970s, most of her work was abstract, with wild arrays of pastels and powerful bright colors or, in contrast, darker, somber ones. Her works are considered to be very emotional and influenced by her holocaust experiences. She did not attain great fame during or after her lifetime.

Kaplan was best known for her works in oils, mixed media, and watercolors. In her later life in Israel, she lived in between Tel Aviv and Safed. Indeed, Like other notable artists of the time, she had a studio in the artists' quarter of Safed and would work there, especially during the summer.

She died in 1987 in Israel.
