= Zvi Lachman =

Israeli sculptor and educator (born 1950)

Zvi Lachman צבי לחמן
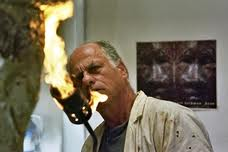
- Lachman, 2009
- Born: 1950 (age 75–76); Tel Aviv, Israel
- Education: Technion, Parson's School of Design
- Known for: Sculpture, Installation Art

Zvi Lachman (Hebrew: צבי לחמן; born 1950) is an Israeli sculptor and educator.

== Biography ==
In 1972 Lachman graduated with a BSc degree in civil engineering from Technion. Lachman studied Architecture in Technion from 1973 till 1976, working as an architect in IDF Navy Construction department at the same time. In 1978 - 1980 he studied sculpture with Chaim Gross in New York as well as attending Parsons School of Design, from which he graduated in 1980 with MFA.

Lachman taught at the Avni Institute of Art and Design in Tel Aviv from 1985 till 1989. He teaches painting and sculpture at the workclasses of Tel Aviv Museum of Art since 1987. Lachman taught sculpture and painting in the "Midrasha" school of art of Beit Berl from 1992 till 1996 and Bezalel Academy of Arts and Design from 1999 till 2003.

Lachman works are part of collection of Israel Museum and private/corporate collections around the world.

== Solo exhibitions ==
- 1977 Paintings and Drawings, Sof Hashdera, Tel-Aviv.
- 1990 "Figure", Sculpture, Herzliya Museum of Contemporary Art.
- 1990 Works on Paper, Gordon Gallery, Tel-Aviv.
- 1993 "Head", Sculptures and works on paper, Gordon Gallery.
- 1994 Painting and drawing, Gordon Gallery.
- 1997 Pastels, Gordon Gallery.
- 1997 "Poets portraits", Poetry Festival, Metula.
- 1999 Gilgamesh Bibliophilic book: Edition of 64 books. Sotheby's, Tel-Aviv.
- 1999 Gilgamesh, Artspace Gallery, Jerusalem.
- 1999 Ransom of the Father Sculptures and works on paper, Museum of Israeli Art, Ramat-Gan.
- 1999 Sculpture installation of "Akedah" (The Binding of Isaac), Meir Hospital, Kefar-Saba.
- 2002 Recent Works from the Studio, 473 Broadway St., New York.
- 2002 Canvasses Against Black, Golkonda Gallery, Tel-Aviv.
- 2003 Angussim, The open Museum, Industrial Park, Omer.
- 2004 Angussim, The open Museum, Industrial Park, Omer.
- 2005 Deathfugue (Bibliophilic book: Edition of 18 books, each includes
- 2005 10 etchings signed and numbered by the artist, The print-shop, Jerusalem.
- 2006 Sculpture installation of "Hanna", Sheba hospital, Tel- Hashomer.
- 2006 Sculpture installation of three Head sculptures,
- 2006 Sculpture Garden, Herzelia College.
- 2007 Amida (sculpture), Golkonda gallery, 117 Herzel st, Tel-Aviv.
- 2007 Poets' Portraits. Beit Reuven Museum, Tel-Aviv.
- 2007 Yeshiva University Museum, New York.
- 2008 Sculpture installation of "Asia", sculpture outside Straus Building,
- 2008 The Industrial Center, Petah Tikva.
- 2008 Thy Face: Poets' Portraits, Wilfred Museum, Hazorea.
- 2008 Poets' Portraits. Meisel Museum, Denver, Colorado.
- 2008 Poets’ Portraits The Rubin Frankel Gallery, Boston University.
- 2011 Self and Portrait Alon Segev Gallery.
- 2011 Standing Man, Sitting Woman. Alon Segev Gallery.

== Gallery ==
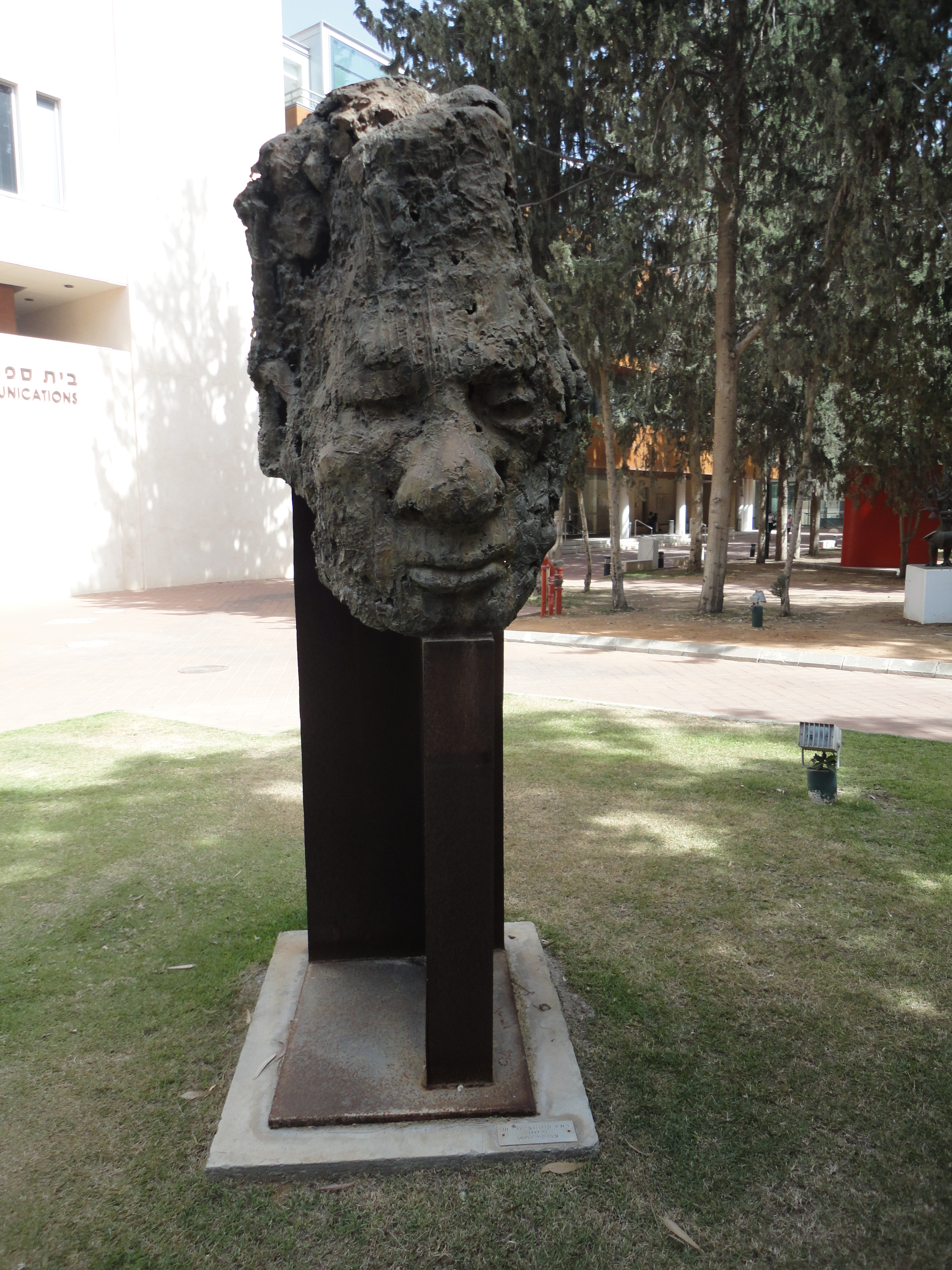

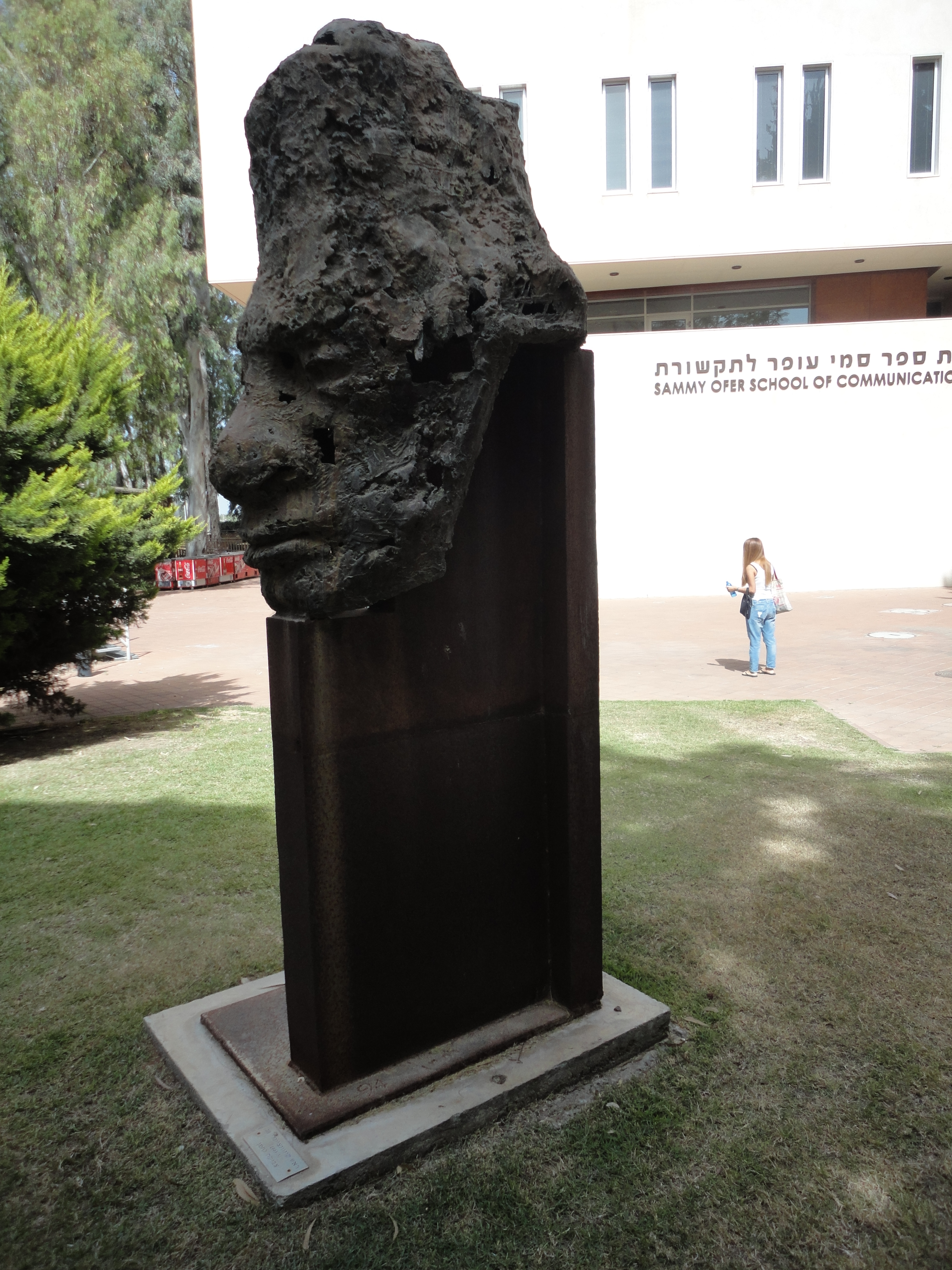

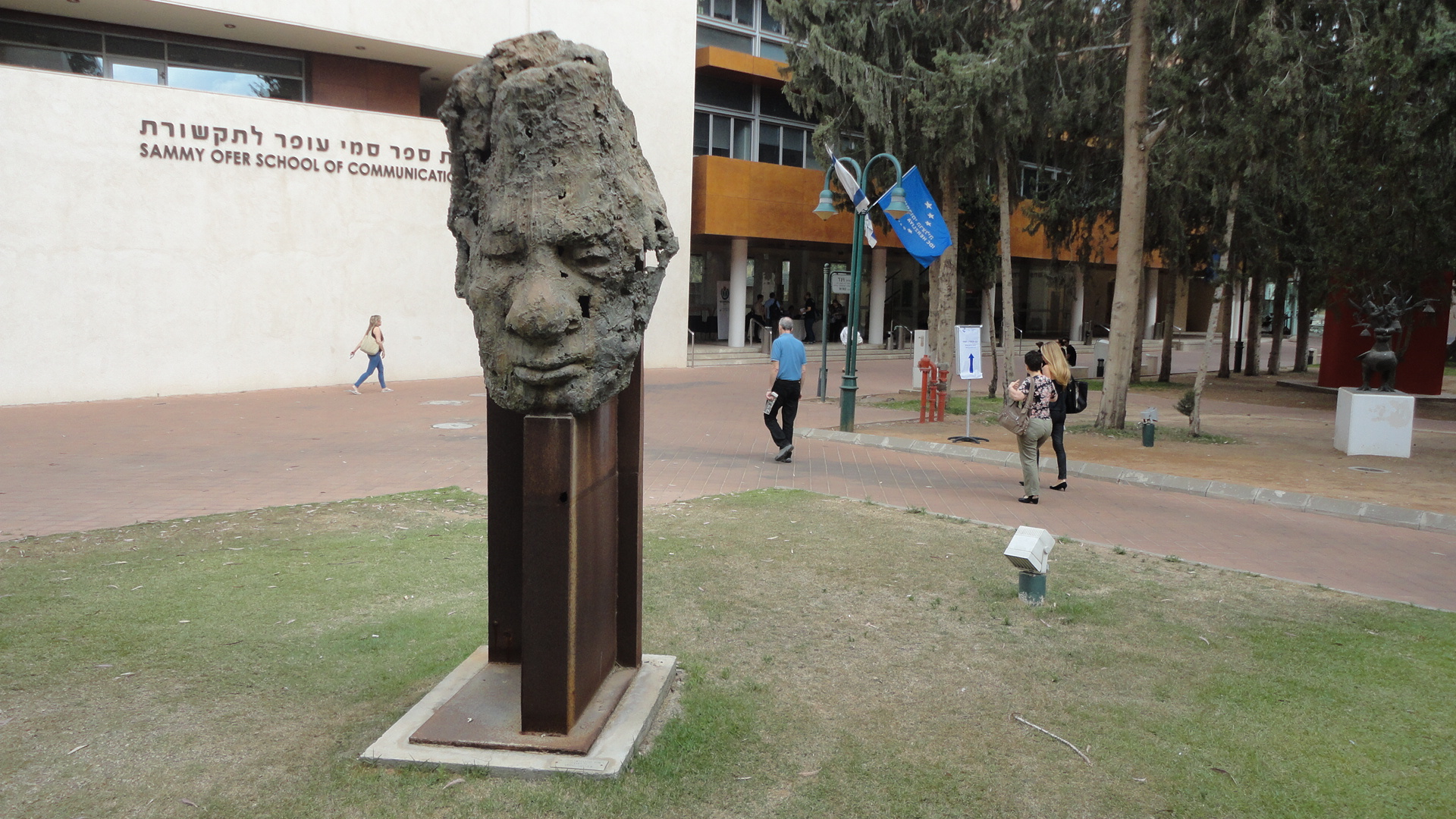

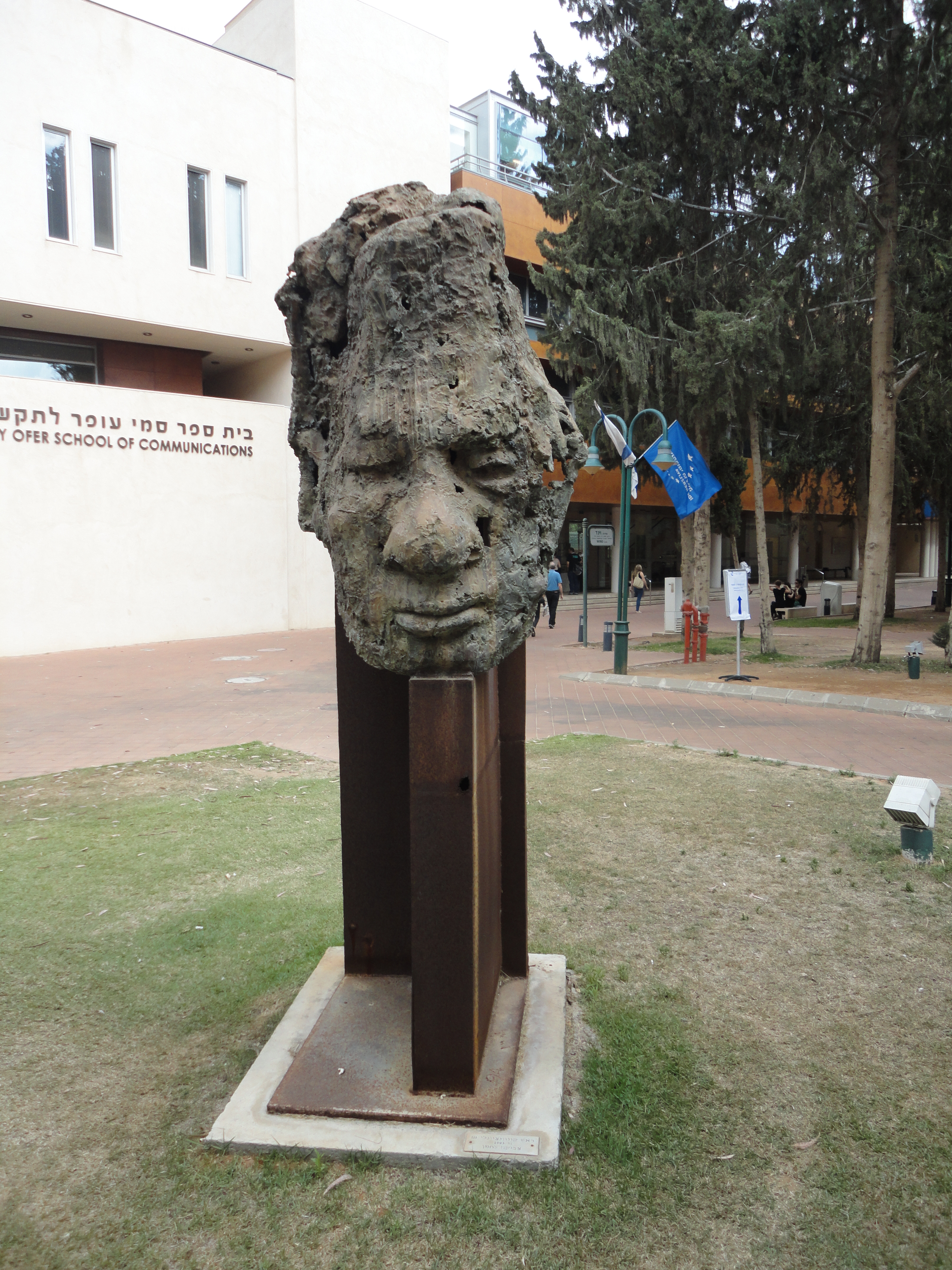

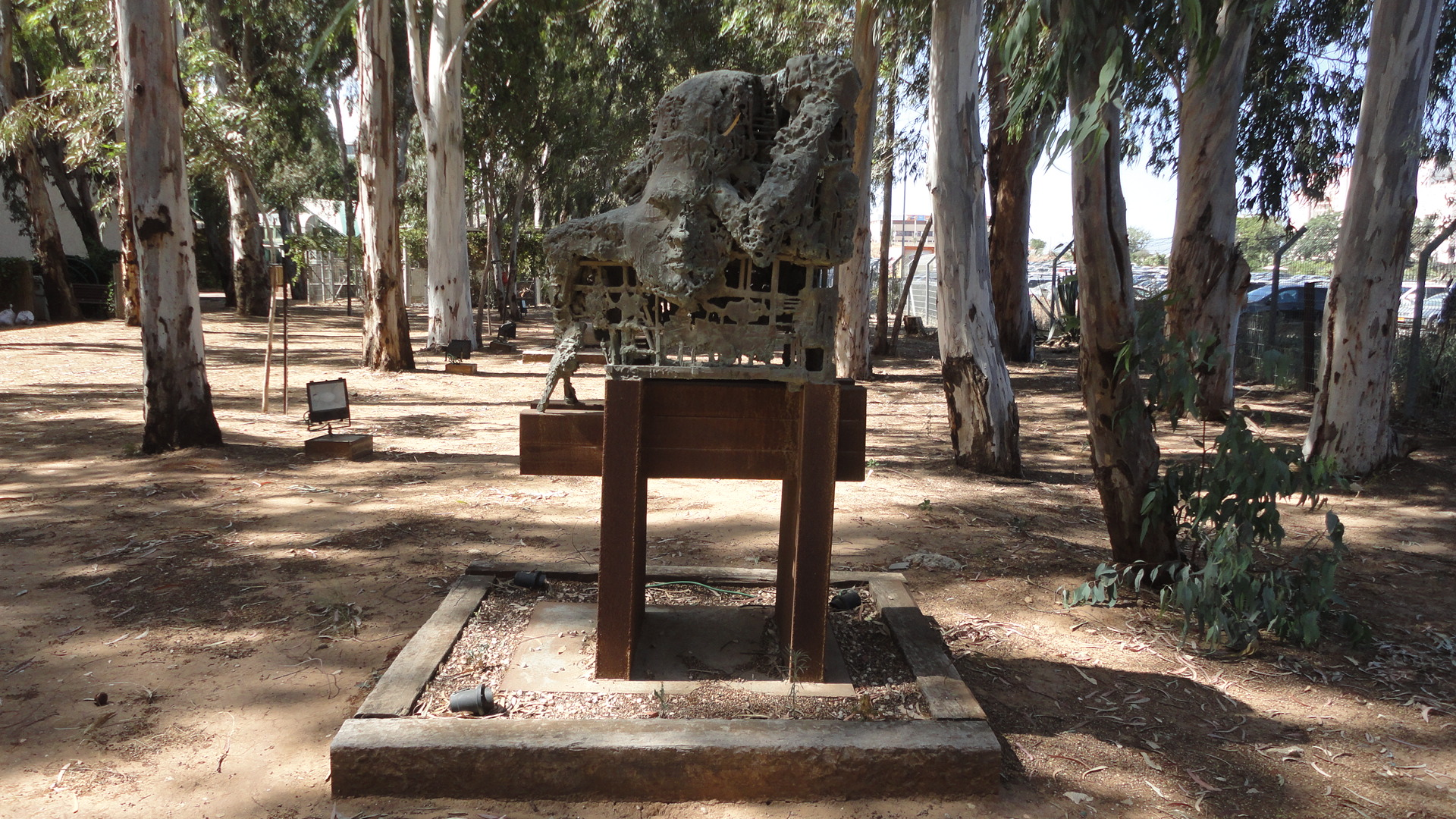

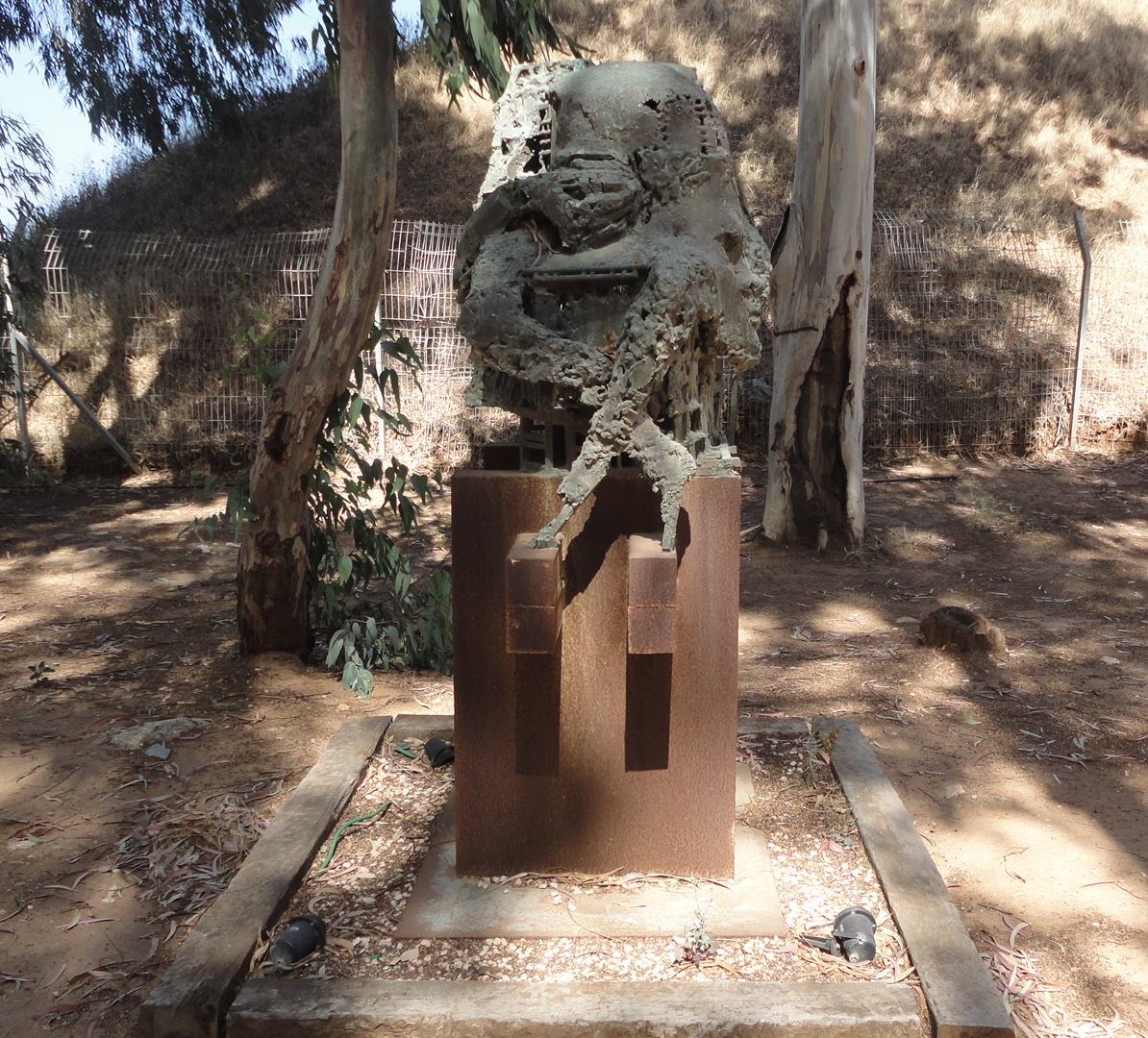

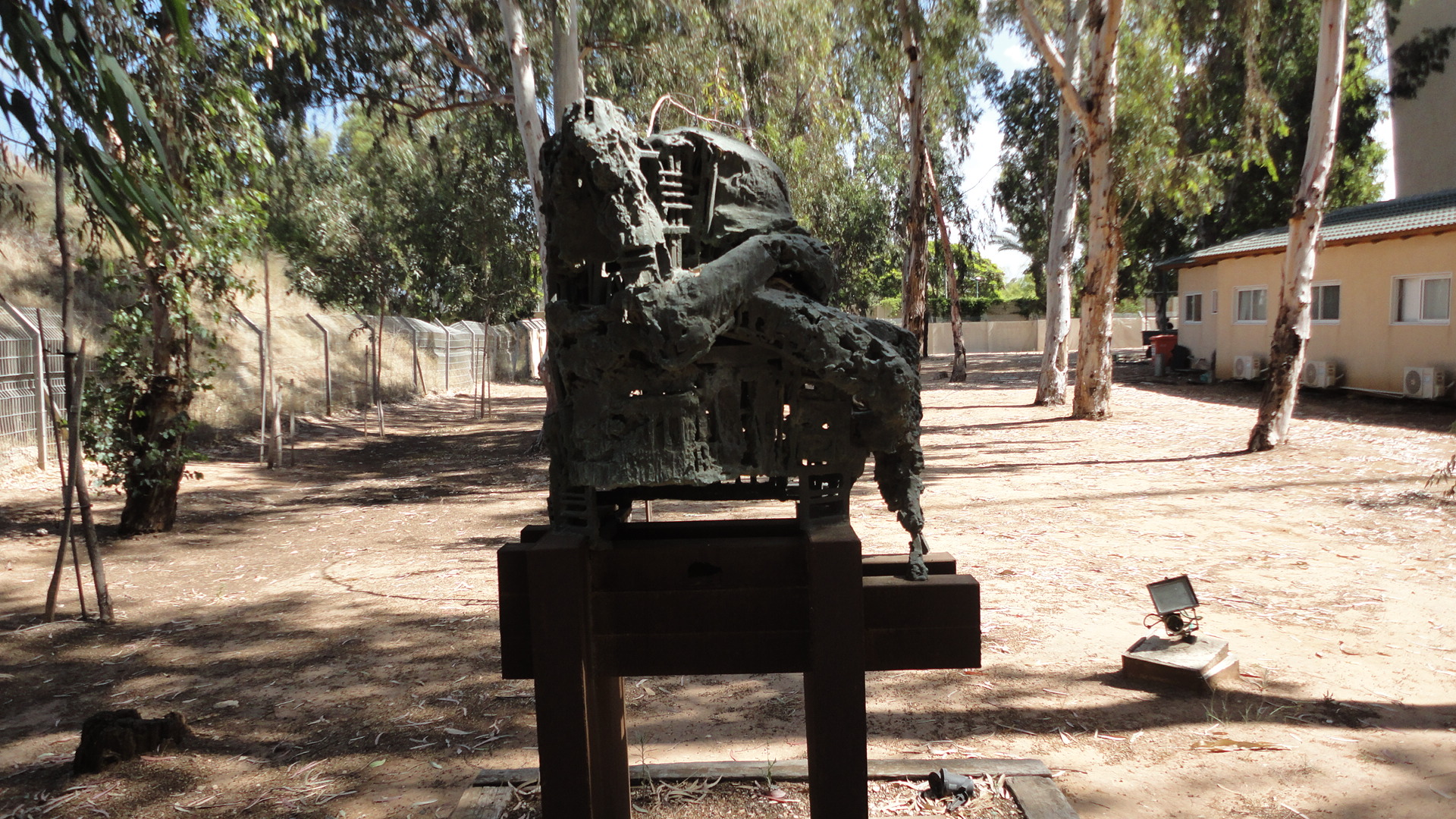
