= Lukhi, Fariman =

Lukhi لوخي
- Village
- Location within Iran
- Coordinates: 35°38′31″N 59°32′59″E
- Country: Iran
- Province: Razavi Khorasan
- County: Fariman
- Bakhsh: Central
- Rural District: Balaband

Population (2006)
  - Total: 63
- Time zone: UTC+3:30 (IRST)
  - Summer (DST): UTC+4:30 (IRDT)

Lukhi (Persian: لوخي, also Romanized as Lūkhī; also known as Lākhī) is a village in Balaband Rural District, in the Central District of Fariman County, Razavi Khorasan Province, Iran. At the 2006 census, its population was 63, in 13 families.
