= Laxman (Scandinavian surname) =

Laxman or Laxmann is a Scandinavian surname. Notable persons with the name include:

- Adam Laxman (1766–1806?), Finnish-Russian explorer and military officer, son of Erik
- Erik Laxmann (1737–1796), Finnish-Russian botanist, father of Adam.
