= Ram Laxman =

Ram Laxman may refer to:

- Rama and Lakshmana, brothers in the epic Ramayana
- Ram Lakshman (film), a 1981 Tamil film
- Ram Lakhan, a 1989 Hindi film
- Ram Laxman (film), a 2004 Bengali film
- Raamlaxman (1942–2021), Indian film score composer
- Ram Lakshman (stunt choreographers), Chella Ram and Chella Lakshman, Indian film action choreographers
