= Anna Ticho =

Israeli artist

- אנה טיכו
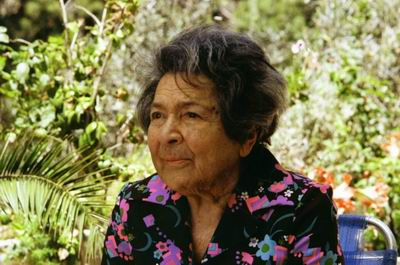
- Anna Ticho in 1978
- Born: 27 October 1894; Brno Moravia (historical—today in the Czech Republic)
- Died: 1 March 1980 (aged 85); Jerusalem, Israel
- Monuments: Ticho House
- Citizenship: Israeli
- Spouse: Avraham Albert Ticho

Anna Ticho (Hebrew: אנה טיכו; 27 October 1894 – 1 March 1980) was an Israeli artist who became famous for her drawings of the Jerusalem hills. Beit Ticho, the house in Jerusalem that she shared with her husband is now a branch of the Israel Museum and a café.

== Biography ==
Anna Ticho was born in Brno, Moravia, then part of the Austro-Hungarian Empire (today the Czech Republic). Her mother's name was Bertha. At the age of 15, she began to study drawing in Vienna in an art school under the directorship of Ernst Nowak.

In 1912, Ticho and her mother immigrated from Vienna to what was then the Mutasarrifate of Jerusalem in the Ottoman Empire. Ticho's fiancé, ophthalmologist Avraham Albert Ticho (1883–1960), who was also her first cousin, had arrived from Vienna four months prior after learning that the Leman'an Zion eye clinic needed a doctor to run it. They married on 7 November 1912 in Jerusalem.

The Tichos were exiled to Damascus in December 1917, just days before the British conquest of Jerusalem. There Dr. Ticho entered active service as a medical office in the Austro-Hungarian Empire and Anna worked as a nurse. She developed a severe case of typhus, and during her recovery, Ticho returned to her art by sketching landscape scenes, foreshadowing later mastery of this genre. After the war, the Tichos returned to Jerusalem via a long and circuitous route. In December 1918, Dr. Ticho established a private clinic north of the ruined Lemaan Zion building and Anna worked as her husband's assistant.

In 1924, the couple purchased a large house surrounded by gardens. Dr. Ticho saw patients in his eye clinic on the lower floor and the couple lived on the second floor. The mansion, known today as Ticho House, was built around 1864, apparently for the Nashashibis, a prominent local family. Before the Tichos lived there it was the family home of the antiquities dealer and forger Wilhelm Moses Shapira. The Tichos hosted local and British government officials in the house, as well as many artists, writers, academics and intellectuals.

In 1950, when Dr. Ticho retired, the couple purchased a home in Motza Ilit where Anna could concentrate on her drawing and painting.

Toward the end of her life, she willed the Ticho house, her art collection—including many of her own works—and her husband's extensive Judaica collection to the Israel Museum.

Ticho died on 1 March 1980.

== Art career ==
Ticho had several solo exhibitions in Mandatory Palestine and in Europe from the 1920s through the 1940s. An even greater number of her individual exhibitions took place in the years following World War II.

While the dramatically different light of the Middle East and the starkness of the landscape inhibited her artistic pursuits at first, in the 1930s Ticho went back to drawing and painting. It was then that she produced many of the distinctive drawings of the hills of Jerusalem and portraits of local people for which she became well known. Today, Ticho's drawings and watercolors can be found in major museums around the world.

== Awards and recognition ==
- In 1970, Ticho received the Yakir Yerushalayim (Worthy Citizen of Jerusalem) award.
- In 1975, Ticho was awarded the Willem Sandberg Prize for Israeli Art by the Israel Museum, Jerusalem.
- In 1980, she was awarded the Israel Prize, for painting (with Pinchas Litvinovsky).

== Selected solo exhibitions ==
- 1959 - Bezalel National Museum, Jerusalem, Israel
- 1959 - Stedelijk Museum Amsterdam
- 1962 - Baltimore Museum of Art
- 1964 - Art Institute of Chicago
- 1964 - Museum Boijmans Van Beuningen, Rotterdam
- 1967 - Rose Art Museum, Brandeis University, Waltham, Massachusetts
- 1970 - Jewish Museum (Manhattan), New york
- 1972 - Ashmolean Museum, Oxford, England
- 1973 - Israel Museum, Jerusalem
- 1974 - Tel Aviv Museum of Art
- 1978 - Israel Museum, Jerusalem
- 1983 - Jewish Museum (Manhattan), New York
- 2010 - Hecht Museum, University of Haifa, Israel
- 2019 - Israel Museum, Ticho House, Jerusalem

== See also ==
- List of Israel Prize recipients
