= Ticho House =

Historical home in Jerusalem

Coordinates: 31.78396°N 35.21957°E

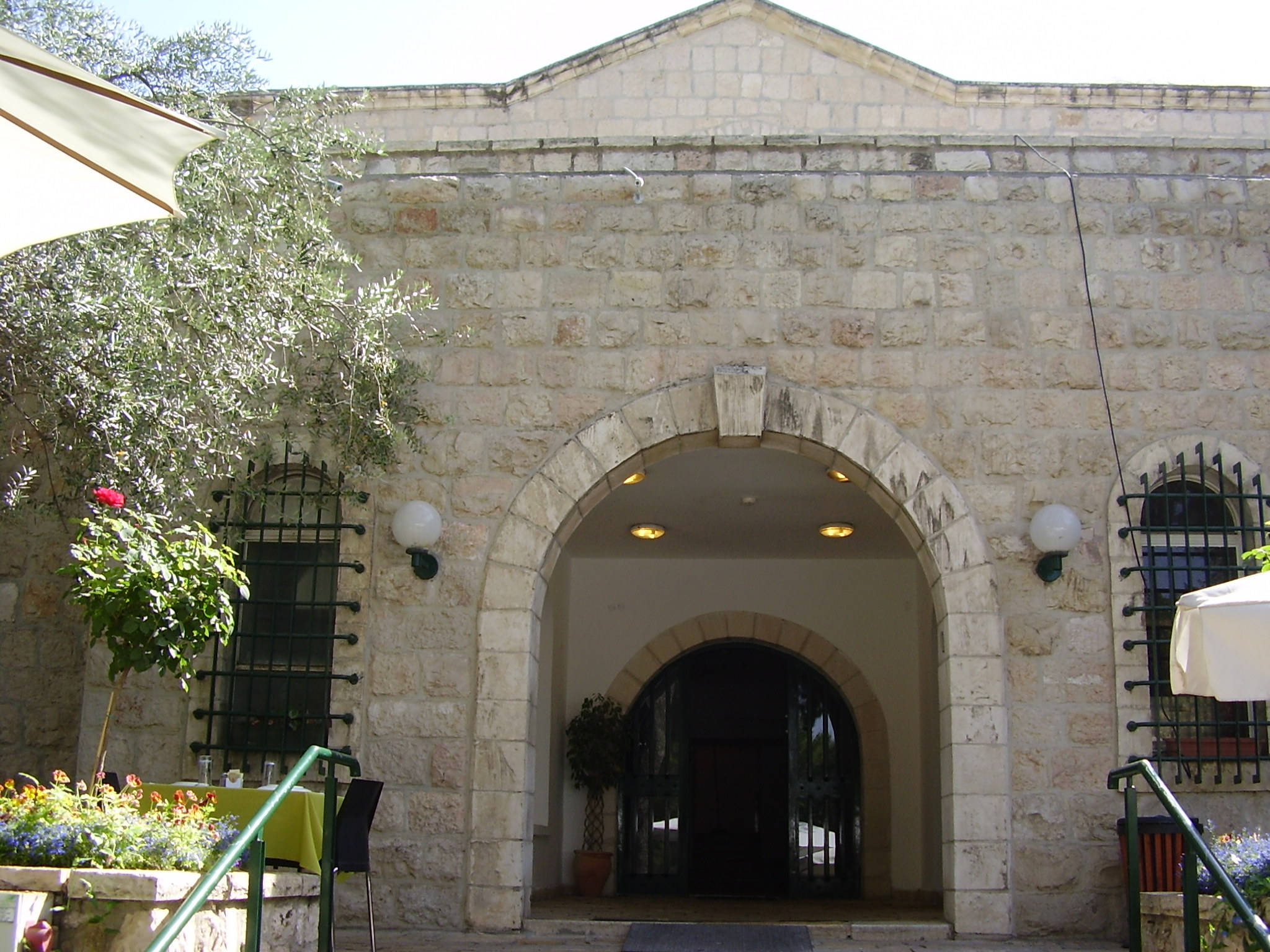
Ticho House

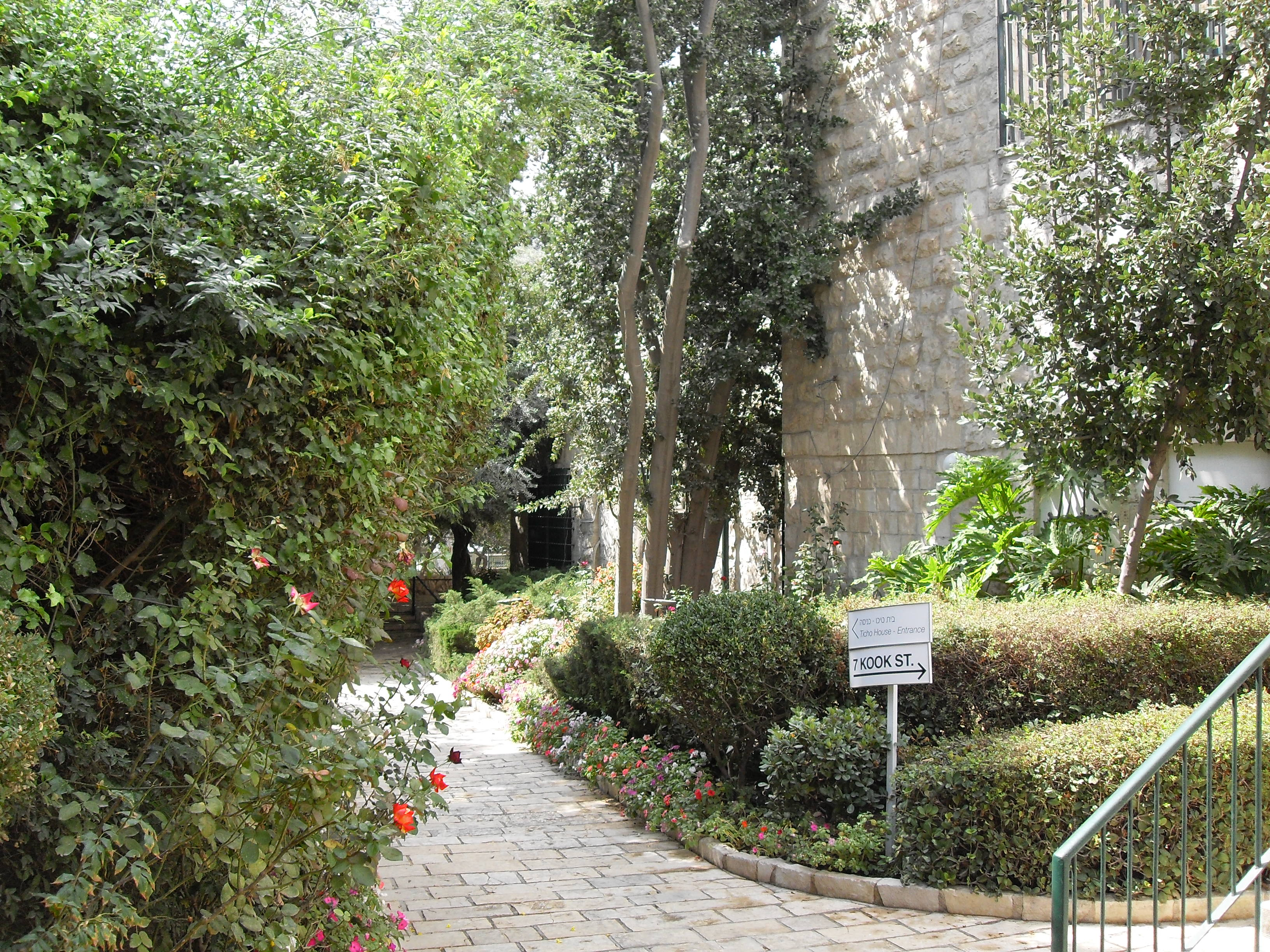
Ticho House entrance

Ticho House (Hebrew: בית טיכו, Beit Tikho) is a historical home in Jerusalem, now a memorial house administered as part of the Israel Museum and also hosting temporary exhibitions, which also houses an Italian café. It was one of the first homes built outside the Old City walls in the 19th century.

== History ==
The Aga Rashid villa, as it was originally known after the man who built and owned it, was raised in the early 1860s outside the Old City walls. It was typical of the urban Ottoman architecture of the time, with vaulted ceilings, thick walls and a large central hall flanked by side rooms. It was surrounded by a spacious garden. Over the years, rooms were added and the house was extended at the front and back.

Among its first occupants was the family of the antiquities dealer Moses Wilhelm Shapira, whose daughter Myriam Harry described growing up there in her memoir, La petite flle de Jerusalem. The family lived there between 1873 and 1883.

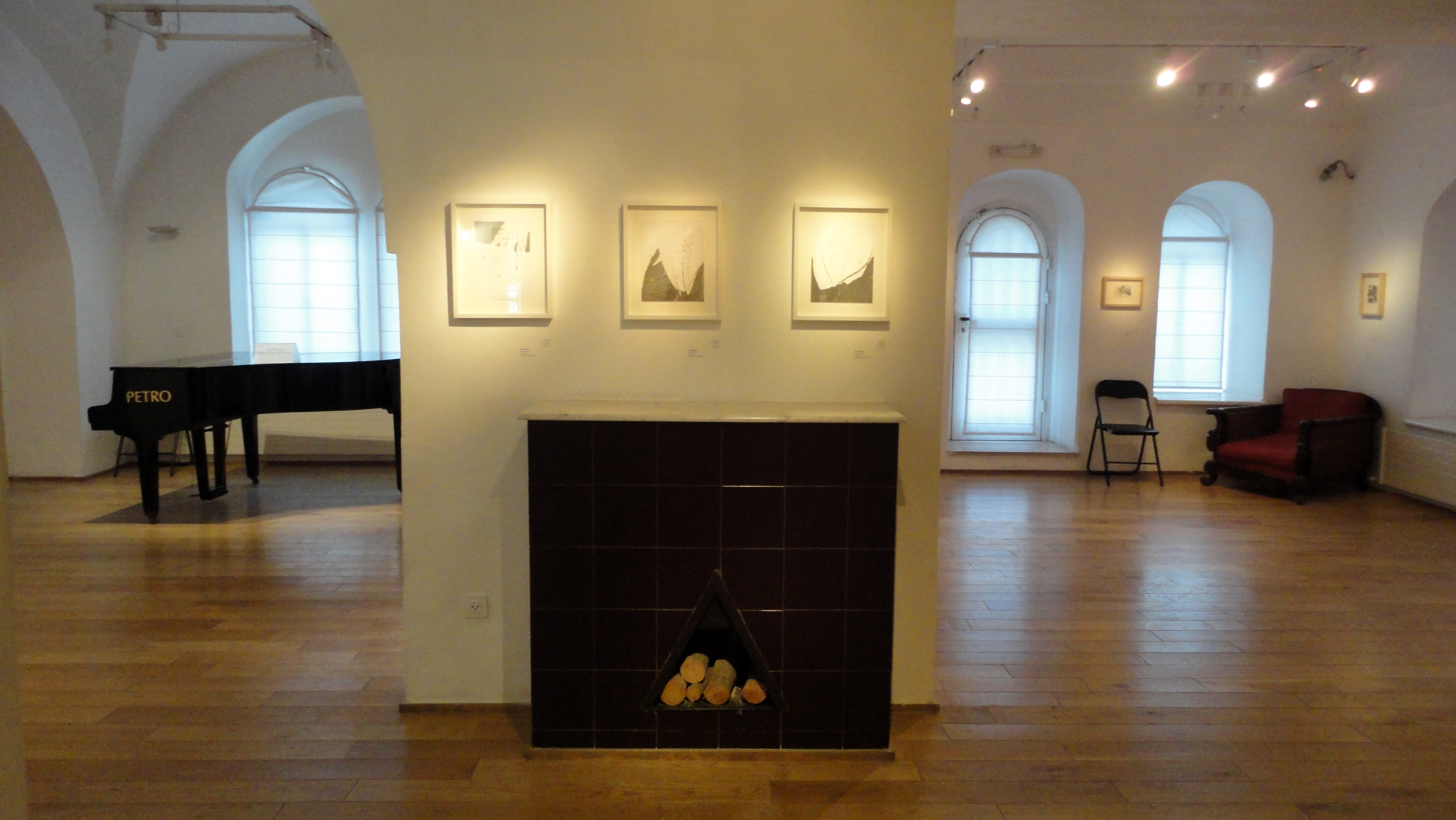
Ticho House interior

In 1924, Dr. Abraham Albert Ticho, an ophthalmologist, and his wife, Anna Ticho, an artist, bought the house. Dr. Ticho was stabbed and seriously wounded during the 1929 Palestine riots. Thousands of Jews, Christians and Muslims prayed for his recovery. When he was able to return to work, he opened a new clinic on the first floor of Beit Ticho and continued to take patients there until his retirement in 1950. Trachoma was widespread in Jerusalem at the time, and he often treated hundreds of patients per day.

The Tichos hosted local and British government officials in their home, as well as artists, writers, academics and intellectuals.

Anna Ticho bequeathed the house and its contents, including her husband's Judaica collections and library, to the Israel Museum.

== See also ==
- Street of the Prophets and Jaffa Road, important nearby thoroughfares
