= Shapira Scroll =

Scroll inscribed with Paleo-Hebrew script

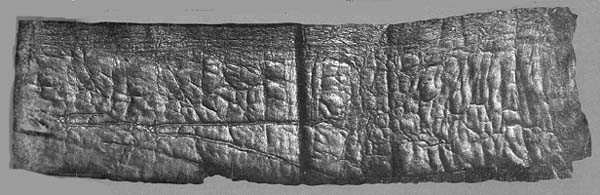
Photograph of one of the Shapira Scroll fragments, prepared by Frederick Dangerfield for Christian David Ginsburg

The Shapira Scroll, also known as the Shapira Strips or Shapira Manuscript, was a set of leather strips inscribed in Paleo-Hebrew script. It was presented by Moses Wilhelm Shapira in 1883 as an ancient Bible-related artifact and almost immediately denounced by scholars as a forgery. More recently some scholars have reopened the debate (see below) but the majority remain to be convinced.

The scroll consisted of fifteen leather strips, which Shapira claimed had been found in Wadi Mujib (biblical Arnon) near the Dead Sea. The Hebrew text hinted at a different version of Deuteronomy, including the addition of a new line to the Ten Commandments: "You shall not hate your brother in your heart: I am God, your god." (Note: The total number of commandments remains ten because I and II have been combined, as in the masoretic division into paragraphs, the ta'am ha-elyon in some versions, or the modern Catholic tradition.) The text also lacks all laws except for the ten commandments, which it renders consistently (Note: In the Masoretic version, Deut. 5:11–16 (III–V) describe God in the third person.) in the first-person, from the standpoint of the deity. Scholars took little time to reject it as a fake, and the shame brought about by the accusation of forgery drove Shapira to suicide in 1884.

Shapira's widow had at least part of the scroll in 1884, which she sent to Konstantin Schlottmann. The scroll reappeared a couple of years later in a Sotheby's auction, where it was sold for £10 5s to Bernard Quaritch, who later listed it for £25. Contemporary reports show Dr. Philip Brookes Mason displayed the "whole of" the scroll at a public lecture in Burton-on-Trent on March 8, 1889. The current whereabouts of the scroll, if it survives, are unknown.

== Discovery of the scroll ==
Shapira gave several different accounts of the scroll's provenance, and the inconsistencies between them have been used as evidence of forgery. Paul Schröder, the first person Shapira showed the scroll to in person, recalled:

Mr. Shapira did not wish to tell me the provenance of the manuscript. He only told me that it came from a tomb beyond the Jordan.

While in Germany, Shapira told Hermann Guthe that:

At the end of July or the beginning of August a certain Selim of the tribe of Adschaje ... offered in the Shapira shop a blackish stripe of leather for sale. Shapira himself was not present and found the cheaply acquired leather in the store on his return. As Selim was unable to visit Jerusalem, he had asked his friend, the Sheik, Mahmud of Abu Dis near Jerusalem, to arrange a meeting with Selim which, finally, brought all the strips into Shapira's possession. (Note: Meyer wrote to Ebers on 8 July, recalling that Shapira had told him and Guthe that "Er hat dieselben 1878 von einem Beduinen erhalten, der sie in Moab in einer Felshöhle gefunden haben will.")

Another is contained within a handwritten letter from Shapira to Professor Hermann Strack of Berlin on 9 May 1883:

In July 1878 I met several Bedouins in the house of the well-known Sheque Mahmud el Arakat, we came of course to speak of old inscriptions. One Bedouin . . . begins to tell a history to about [sic] the following effect. Several years ago some Arabs had occasion to flee from their enemies & hid themselves in caves high up in a rock facing the Moujib (the neues Arnon [sic]) they discovered there several bundles of very old rugs. Thinking they may [sic] contain gold they peeled away a good deal of Cotton or Linen & found only some black charms & threw them away; but one of them took them up & and [sic] since having the charms in his tent, he became a wealthy man having sheeps [sic] etc.

Shapira wrote a letter to Ginsburg in early August, informing him that:

In July 1878, the Sheik Machmud Arakat, the well-known chief of the guides from Jerusalem to the Jordan, paid me the customary visit ... [as] the Sheik hat Bedouins of the East in his house, he brought them all with him. ... I heard the next day ... some men of his acquaintance had hidden themselves, in the time when Wali of Damascus was fighting the Arabs, in caves hewn high up in a rock ... near the Modjib. They found there several bundles of old black linen. They peeled away the linen and ... there were only some black inscribed strips of leather, which they threw away (or I believe he said threw into the fire, but I am not certain); but one of them picked them up. ... I asked the Sheik to employ him as a messenger to bring me some of the pieces that I might examine them, but the Sheik thought that that man would not do it, but he knew a man who was not superstitious at all. ... In about twelve days I got four or five columns ... in eight days more he brought me about sixteen; in eleven or twelve days more four or five ... I have not seen the man again. The Sheik died soon, and I lost every trace that would enable me to follow the object further.

In an account to the Palestine Exploration Fund on July 20, 1883, Shapira said that:

[H]e first heard of the fragments in the middle of July 1878. A Sheikh, with several Arabs of different tribes came to him at his place of business in Jerusalem on other matters. The Sheikh had nothing to do with antiquities. They spoke of some little black fragments of writing in the possession of an Arab. They had been found in the neighborhood of Arnon. One of the Arabs spoke of them as talismans, smelling of asphalte. The day following Shapira was invited to dinner by the Sheikh, and heard more about the fragments. About the year 1865, at a time of persecution, certain Arabs had hid themselves among the rocks. There, on the side of a rocky cavern, they found several bundles wrapped in linen. Peeling off the covering they found only black fragments, which they threw away. They were picked up by one of the Arabs, believing them to be talismans ... Shapira promised the Sheikh a reward if he would bring to him an Arab he spoke of who would be able to get hold of the fragments. This happened on the day of the dinner. The Sheikh fell ill, and afterwards died. About ten or twelve days after the dinner, a man of the Ajayah tribe brought to him a small piece ... a week later, he brought fourteen or fifteen columns ... the next Sunday, fourteen or fifteen more ... ten days after, on Wednesday, he brought three or four columns, very black. Shapira saw nothing more of him.

Claude Reigner Conder received yet another version from Shapira, which attributed the scroll and the Moabite forgeries to the same location and claimed a mummy (Note: Guthe recalls that Shapira claimed to have previously explored the same cave with Hermann Almkvist and found a mummy there. Meyer wrote to Ebers: "Die Streifen sind nur auf einer Seite beschrieben, und haben deutlich zur Einwickelung einer Leiche gedient. Auf der Rückseite findet sich Mumienbalsam (so heißt es ja wohl) und ähnliche Schmierstoffe, in einigen Fällen sind Abdrücke von Leinengeweben deutlich zu erkennen . . . Wie gern würde ich die Lappen gesehen haben!") had been found with the scroll.

== Presentation of the scroll ==
=== In Germany ===
On 24 September 1878, Shapira sent copies to Konstantin Schlottmann, who had wrongly authenticated Shapira's Moabite forgeries in 1870. Schlottmann consulted with Franz Delitzsch and then denounced the scroll as a fabrication. Delitzsch published separately in his journal Saat auf Hoffnung in 1880, calling it a fake.

On 9 May 1883, Shapira wrote a ten-page letter to Hermann Strack, saying he'd trust Strack's judgement over his own with regard to the scroll's authenticity. Strack replied on 27 May, declaring "that it was not worth [Shapira]'s while to bring such an evident forgery to Europe." Also in May 1883, Shapira showed one piece of the manuscript to Paul Schröder, then the German consul in Beirut, for a short time in poor light; he refused to authenticate it without longer study of all the fragments. (Note: In England, Shapira claimed Schröder had pronounced the manuscript genuine and asked to purchase it. Guthe says that Carlo von Landberg authenticated this claim, but Schroder later denied it in a letter to the London Times.)

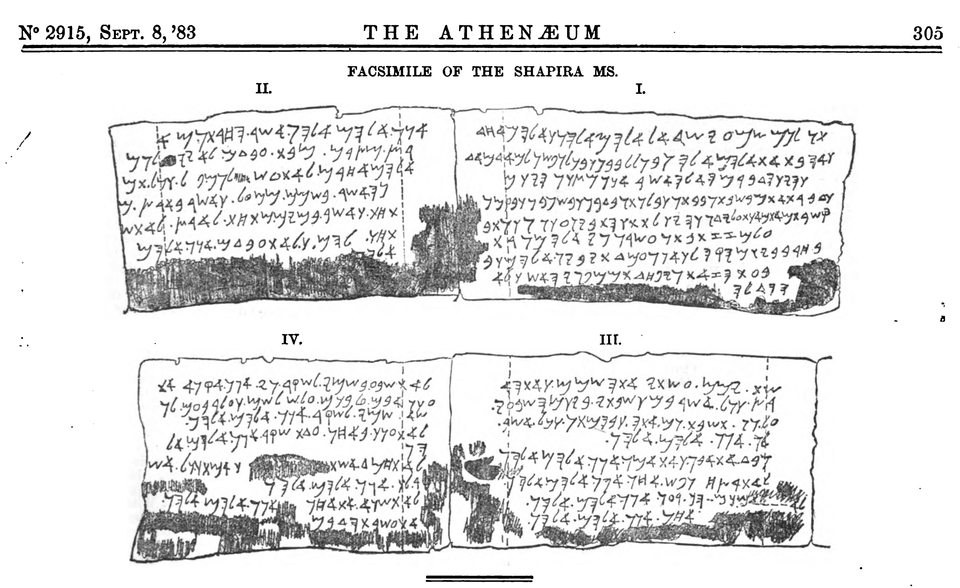
Tracing of four columns including the Decalogue by William St. Chad Boscawen and Miss Tennant, under the strict superintendence of Christian David Ginsburg. Published in The Athenaeum, 8 September 1883

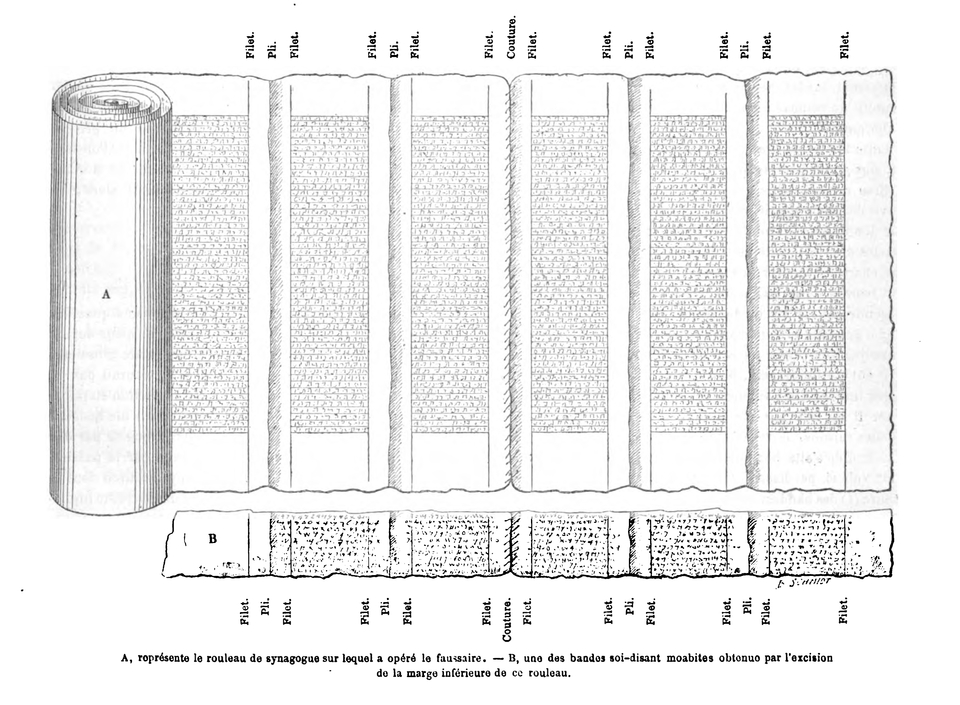
The form of Shapira's strips compared to a synagogue scroll margin.

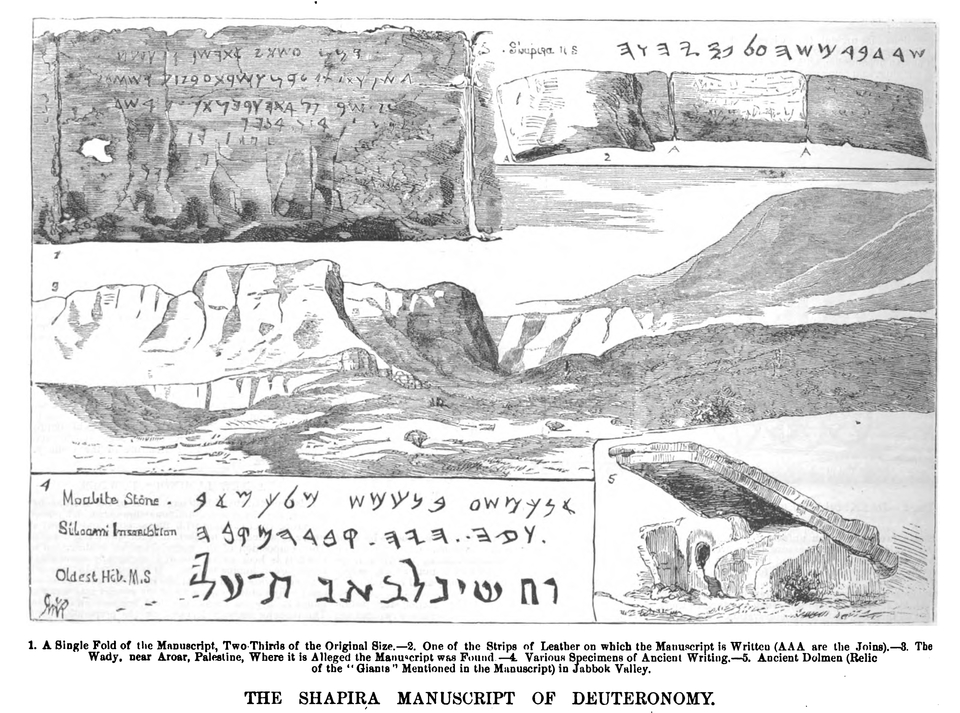
One fold of the manuscript/One of the leather strips/Wadi Mujib/Specimens of ancient writing/Dolmen near Jabbok.

In June 1883, perhaps having revised the text, Shapira brought the scroll to Germany in an attempt to sell it to the Royal Library of Berlin. Karl Richard Lepsius, then the Library's keeper, convened a symposium of leading Bible scholars in Berlin (Lepsius himself, Eduard Sachau, Eberhard Schrader, August Dillmann, Adolf Erman, and Moritz Steinschneider) to evaluate the scroll on July 10; these unanimously declared it a fake after a 90-minute inspection. (Note: In England, Shapira claimed Lepsius had not reached a definitive conclusion and that Erman believed it authentic.) In a separate German analysis in the first week of July, published August 14, Hermann Guthe and Eduard Meyer concluded the scroll was a forgery; (Note: Shapira stopped in Halle and Leipzig on the way to Berlin, but could not convince Guthe to form a larger symposium. In England, Shapira claimed Guthe had concluded the manuscript was genuine.) Theodor Nöldeke and Emil Friedrich Kautzsch were said to agree. Shapira also showed the scroll to Strack in person, whose view did not change. The Royal Library offered to buy it at a lower price, to enable German students to study the forger's technique; (Note: According to the Times of London; Hermann Strack wrote on August 31st that "Lepsius ... absolutely refused to purchase the manuscript.") Shapira took it to London instead. The German scholars did not publicize their findings, and other experts' conclusions were reached independently.

=== In London ===
On July 20, Shapira informed the secretary of the Palestine Exploration Fund that he had brought the manuscript to London, and on July 24 he showed the manuscript to the Fund's Walter Besant and Claude Reignier Conder. On July 26, he displayed the manuscript to a large number of British scholars at the Fund's offices, even tearing off a portion to demonstrate the parchment's interior; the manuscript was then taken to the British Museum for further inspection.

Shapira sought to sell the scroll to the British Museum for a million pounds, (Note: Equivalent to $173 million in 2021.) and allowed the Museum to exhibit two of the 15 strips. The Museum designated Christian David Ginsburg to evaluate the strips, and he published transcriptions, translations, and facsimiles over the following weeks. On August 4, 1883, Walter Flight of the British Museum reported that much of the leather looked ancient but the margin of one piece looked brand new; on August 17, Edward Augustus Bond, principal librarian of the British Museum, indicated that he too thought they were fake.

On August 13, Adolf Neubauer, who had earlier exposed Shapira's fake "coffin of Samson", identified the scroll as a forgery; on August 19, he published further arguments against its authenticity, as did Archibald Sayce on the same day. Neubauer's identification was later called the scroll's death knell.

The French Ministry of Public Instruction's Charles Simon Clermont-Ganneau, who had earlier revealed Shapira's Moabite forgeries, arrived in England on the 15th, already harboring "most serious doubts." He obtained a quick look at some fragments from Ginsburg, but was quickly banned by Shapira from further studying the scroll. However, Clermont-Ganneau closely examined the two strips on display at the public exhibition on August 18 and, on August 21, he declared them to be forgeries. Claude Reignier Conder also declared them fake on the 18th, (Note: Conder felt pressure to refute Shapira's claims that Conder had also encountered the story of the scroll in Palestine. He wrote that he had never heard of it there and, upon seeing Shapira's scroll in England, he had not hesitated "in concluding that they were deliberate forgeries". Conder's account is confirmed by Walter Besant (Autobiography, p. 162-3, cf. his General Work of the Society, p. 37-39), who records that Conder "Observe[d] that all the points objected to by German critics have vanished in this new and epoch-making trouvaille. The geography is not confused, and Moses does not record his own death . . . and I know, I believe, all the caves of Moab and they are all damp and earthy", concluding that it was a fake, immediately after inspecting the scroll on July 24.) and Ernest Renan, Albert Löwy, and Charles Henry Waller soon followed. By August 25, the Grantham Journal reported, "The official verdict on the authenticity of Mr. Shapira's manuscripts has not been given but the published evidence of experts who have examined them is unanimous against it."

On August 27, Christian David Ginsburg, who as the designated philological examiner of the British Museum had been given access to the entire scroll, published the same conclusion. (Note: Ginsburg wrote to his daughter on September 3rd that he "was sure the first week of [his] examination that it was a forgery".) Earlier that week, the British Museum had ceased to display Shapira's strips. Ginsburg also suggested that the shape of the strips, their ruling, and the leather used matched Yemenite scrolls Shapira had sold in 1877, the year before he began shopping the strips. Clermont-Ganneau later made the same assessment. Schlottmann, Delitzch, Strack, and Steinschneider, amazed at the ongoing situation in England, each published their July findings for the British audience in September. Ginsburg and Clermont-Ganneau published their final reports that same month.

== Aftermath and scroll's fate ==
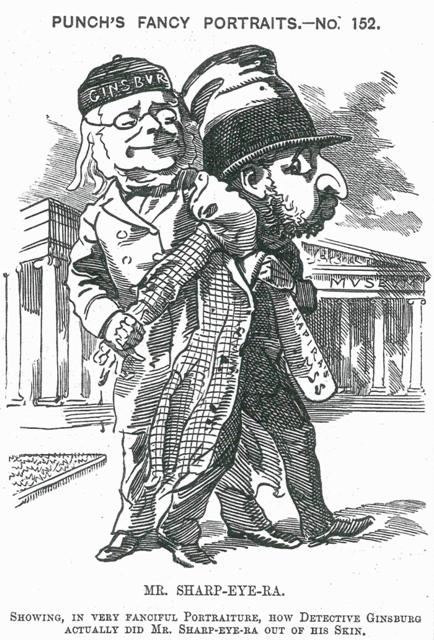
1883 Punch cartoon of Shapira and Ginsburg

Ginsburg's conclusion drove Shapira to despair, and he fled London.

"You have made a fool of me by publishing and exhibiting things you believe to be false. I do not think I shall be able to survive this shame. Although I am not yet convinced that the manuscript is a forgery – unless Monsieur Ganneau did it. I will leave London in a day or two for Berlin.
Yours truly, Moses Wilhelm Shapira"

— Shapira's letter to Ginsburg, August 23, 1883

In spite of writing to Ginsburg that he would leave for Berlin, he fled London to Amsterdam instead, leaving the manuscript behind, and from Amsterdam he wrote a letter to Edward Augustus Bond, principal librarian of the British Museum, begging for reconsideration of the manuscript. In both letters, Shapira reaffirmed his belief in the scroll's authenticity. Six months later, on 9 March 1884, he shot himself at the Hotel Willemsbrug in Rotterdam.

Shapira's widow, Anna Magdalena Rosette, had at least part of the scroll in 1884, as evidenced by a note in the Ginsburg file left by Bond. Rosette sent "two small pieces" to Schlottmann for further study in 1884. It later appeared in an auction at Sotheby's in 1885 and it was purchased by Bernard Quaritch, a bookseller, for £10 5s. Two years later, Quaritch listed the scroll for sale for £25 and displayed it at the Anglo-Jewish Historical Exhibition in 1887.

In 1970 Professor Alan David Crown, on the basis of a misreading of a letter from Sir Charles Nicholson to Walter Scott wherein Nicholson claimed that "most" of the Shapira manuscripts had fallen into his hands, advanced the hypothesis that Nicholson had acquired the Shapira Scroll itself, with the scroll destroyed in a fire in Nicholson's London study in 1899, along with most of his collection. Apart from Nicholson's hyperbole—he is only known to have acquired six Torah scrolls compared to the 167 manuscripts acquired in 1884 by Adolph Sutro—Nicholson never wrote that he acquired the Shapira scroll itself. Crown's hypothesis was widely accepted as the best explanation of the scroll's fate.

In 2011 Australian researcher Matthew Hamilton identified the actual owner of the scroll, the English doctor and natural historian, Dr. Philip Brookes Mason. Contemporary reports show Dr. Philip Brookes Mason displayed the "whole of" the scroll at a public lecture in Burton-on-Trent on March 8, 1889. Further whereabouts of the scroll, if it survived, are unknown.

== Features of the scroll ==
=== Physical appearance ===
Shapira's scroll was composed of fifteen leather strips, some easy to read and others blackened to the point of near-illegibility. Each complete strip was extremely narrow, about 3.5 inches by 7 inches. Each complete strip had an average of ten lines of writing on one side only. They were folded, not rolled. Each complete strip was folded between one and three times, for a total of 40 folds. They were covered in dark glutinous matter and had a faint odor of funeral spices or asphalt, known in the nineteenth century for their use in Egyptian mummification but not later found on genuine Dead Sea scrolls. Some of the strips were covered in oil, artificially darkening the parchment, on top of which some had a layer of grey ash, which Shapira said had been applied to absorb the oil. Each segment had one rough edge and one smooth edge, consistent with a top or bottom margin recently cut off an older manuscript. Each segment had vertical creases marked with a hard point as a scribe would mark for columns, but the text of the Shapira scroll has no relation to these lines, weaving in and out of them randomly, suggesting that a forger had taken the blank margin of a marked Torah scroll and written his text ignoring the faint column lines. Ginsburg and Clermont-Ganneau suggested that the material was identical to the leather of the medieval Yemenite Torah scrolls in which Shapira had dealt in the preceding years. The outline of a frame could be seen, perhaps used to administer aging chemicals, and the straight edge of one segment looked new.

=== Script ===
The scroll is written scriptio continua except in the Decalogue, a style never discovered in other Hebrew manuscripts but widely assumed by Shapira's contemporaries to have been the original form of the text. In the Decalogue, every word is followed by an interpunct except לא, do not, and nota accusativi. The writing, by multiple hands, more closely resembles that of inscriptions like the Mesha Stele, already published by 1878, than it does the Paleo-Hebrew writing later found on parchment, or even the Siloam inscription, which would be published in 1880; even in the nineteenth century the similarity was thought suspect. André Lemaire authored a recent paleographic analysis (1997):

However, the letter shapes do not correspond exactly to any known ancient West Semitic script. It is neither Moabite (although most letters seem like imitations of Moabite writing in the Mesha Stele, which records the ninth-century B.C.E. Moabite king Mesha's victories over Israel. ...) nor "Canaanite" (West Semitic writing from about the 13th to the 11th century B.C.E.). It is neither the Hebrew script used during the First Temple period nor the archaizing paleo-Hebrew script found on coins of the First Jewish Revolt against Rome (66–70 C.E.) and the Second Jewish Revolt (132–135 C.E.) and in several of the Dead Sea Scrolls.

Ginsburg reported that some strips were duplicates in different hands, with very slight differences (noted infra).

=== Spelling and wording ===
The text uses Moabite spellings, made famous by the Mesha Stele in 1870 but never attested in any Israelite text or on parchment; some aberrant plene spellings, as of יום and סיחן, further suggested forgery. The text omits some consonantal yods as well, suggesting an erroneous attempt to replicate Moabite spellings. The scroll contains several apparent misspellings, ungrammatical phrases, and words from later Hebrew, which featured prominently in the negative assessments of its authenticity. The scroll often replaces Deuteronomic words with close synonyms, including ירא > פחד, שכב > בעל, קצפ > אנפ, לפנים > מעלם, and more; these synonyms are not always exact, resulting in incongruent grammar, and sometimes appear to rely on later meanings unattested in Biblical Hebrew.

== Modern scholarship ==
Despite the unanimous assessment of the 19th century scholars who had access to the manuscripts that they were a forgery, (Note: A possible exception is Eduard Meyer, who wrote to Georg Ebers (Note: Ebers himself, Meyer's mentor, helped pen a German satire of the forgery.) on 16 July, saying that, although he would not contest the Berlin symposium's decision alone, he was personally convinced of their authenticity. However, Meyer never published this opinion and never contested his partner Guthe's conclusion that the strips were forged based on separate linguistic evidence (Meyer: "ich ja kein besonders fester Hebräer bin"). Guthe published his and Meyer's transcription and his analysis weeks later and is careful to note several differences between his and Meyer's analysis, which were apparently all minor.) a few have argued the scroll was genuine since it was lost.

Menahem Mansoor argued in 1956 that re-examination of the case would be justified. Mansoor's suggestion was immediately attacked by Moshe H. Goshen-Gottstein and by Oskar K. Rabinowicz, but J. L. Teicher and others argued the scroll could be genuine. More recently, Shlomo Guil (2017), Idan Dershowitz (2021), Ross Nichols (2021), and others have argued that the strips were genuine.

These claims have been contested by many scholars.

In March 2024, Dershowitz claimed that he had discovered a fragment of Genesis, stylistically identical to the Shapira strips and sharing provenance, which would soon be carbon-dated and decide the issue. As of September 2025, no results have been released.

== Text of the scroll ==
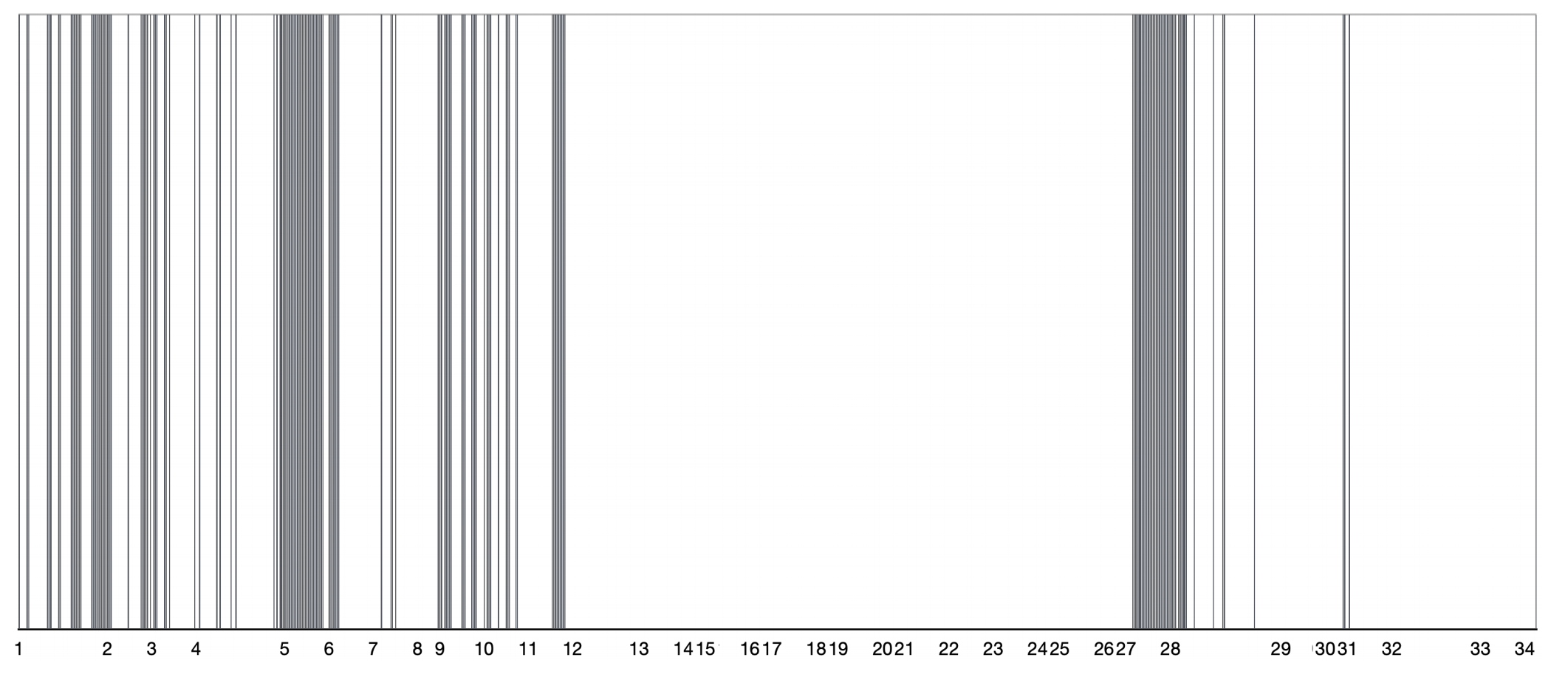
Table of correspondences between Deuteronomy and the Shapira Scroll

| Ginsburg's block print transcription | Ginsburg's translation | Deut. parallel |
|---|---|---|
| אלה הדברם אשר דבר משה על פי יהוה אל כל בני ישראל במדבר בעבר הירדן בערבה | These be the words which Moses spake according to the mouth of Jehovah unto all the children of Israel in the wilderness beyond the Jordan in the plain. | 1:1 |
| אלהם אלהנו דבר אלנו בחרב לאמר . רב לכם שבת בהר הזה | God our God spake unto us in Horeb, saying, Ye have dwelt long enough in this mount. | 1:6 |
| פנו וסעו לכם ובאו הר האמרי ואל כל שכנו בערבה בהר ובשפלה ובחף הים | Turn you and take your journey and go to the mount of the Amorites, and unto all the places nigh there unto, in the plain, in the hills, and in the vale, and by the seaside. | 1:7 |
| ונסע מחרב ונלך את כל המדבר הגדל והנרא הזה אשר ראתם ונבא עד קדש ברנע | And when we departed from Horeb we went through all that great and terrible wilderness, which ye saw; and we came to Kadesh-Barnea. | 1:19 |
| ואמר אלכם באתם היום (Note: Yom is consistently spelled plene. Neubauer, Löwy, and others found this suspicious.) עד הר האמרי עלו ורשו את הארץ כאשר דבר . . . אבתם | And I said unto you, Ye are come this day unto the mountain of the Amorites. Go ye up and possess ye the land, as said [unto thee the God of thy fathers.] | 1:20 |
| לעלות ותרגנו ותאמרו בשנא . . . לאבדנו | [Notwithstanding] ye would [not] go up. And ye murmured and said, Because [God] hated us ... to cause us to perish. | 1:27 |
| וינאף (Note: Ginsburg notes: "The compiler of the text, who was a tolerable adept in writing Hebrew, could not have been familiar with the Phoenician characters exhibited in these slips . . . he would have especially noticed the transposition of the two letters in the predicate applied to God, which, instead of saying He was 'angry', declares that He 'committed adultery'".) אלהם וישבע לאמר חי אני כי כל העם הראם את אתתי ואת מפתי אשר עשתי זה עשר פעמים . . . לא . . . שמעו בקלי אם יראו את הארץ הטבה אשר נשבעתי לתת לאבתהם . בלתי טפכם וכלב בן יפנה ויהשע בן נן העמד לפנך המה יבאו שמה ולהם אתננה | And God was angry [and sware] saying, As I live, surely all the people that saw my wonders and my signs which I have done these ten times ... not ... they have not hearkened unto my voice, they shall not see that good land which I sware to give unto their fathers, save your children and Caleb the son of Jephunneh and Joshua the son of Nun which standeth before thee, they shall go in thither, and unto them will I give it. | 1:34–36 |
| ואתם פנו לכם וסעו המדברה דרך ים סף עד תם כל הדר אנשי המרבה מקרב המחנה | But as for you, turn you and take your journey into the wilderness by the way of the Red Sea, until all the generation of the men of rebellion shall be wasted out from among the host. | 1:40 |
| ותשבו בקדש ברנע עד תמו אנשי המרבה למת מקרב המחנה . . . [א]תם עברם היום את גבל בני עשו היושבם [בש]עיר | [And they abode] in Kadesh-Barnea until the men of rebellion were wasted out by death from amongst the host. ... Ye are to pass over this day the coast of the children of Esau, which dwell in Seir. | 1:46, 2:4 |
| לא [תצר]ם ולא תתגר בם מלחמה כי לא אתן מארצם לכם ירשה כי לבני עשו נתתה ירשה | Thou shalt not distress them, nor meddle with them in war, for I will not give you of their land any possession, because I have given it unto the children of Esau for a possession. | 2:5 |
| החרם מעלם (Note: Ginsburg suggests the author used me'olam instead of the Masoretic lefanim because the word me'olam appears on the Mesha stele. Cf. Mesha's "The men of Gad lived in the land of Ataroth me'olam".) ישבה (Note: Ungrammatical; ישבו would be expected.) בה ובני עשו ירשם וישבו תחתם | The Horim from of old dwelt therein, and the children of Esau succeeded them, and dwelt in their stead. | 2:12 |
| ונפן ונעבר את מדבר מאב . ויאמר אלהם אלי אתם עברם היום את גבל מאב לא תצרם ולא תתגר בם מלחמה כי לא אתן מארצם לכם ירשה כי לבני לט נתתי ער ירשה | And we turned and passed the wilderness of Moab. And God said unto me, Ye shall pass over this day the coast of Moab, ye shall not distress them, nor meddle with them in war, for I will not give you of their land any possession, because I have given unto the children of Lot the city for a possession. | 2:8–9 |
| רפאם מעלם ישבו בה והמאבם יקראו להם אמם וישמדם אלהם וישבו תחתם | The giants dwelt therein from of old, and the Moabites called them Amim, but God destroyed them, and they dwelt in their stead. | 2:10 |
| ונפן ונעבר את נחל זרד ויאמר אלהם אלי לאמר קמו ועברו את נחל ארנן | And we turned and passed the brook Zered. And God said unto me [saying], Rise ye up and pass over the river Arnon. | 2:13, 17–19 |
| היום החלתי לתת לפנך את סיחן (Note: Löwy: "The forger had eliminated from the text nearly all the waws & yods which serve as matres lectionis, in order to bring his work in harmony with the ancient Phoenician inscriptions. But he had forgotten to be consistent. For example, Sihon is written with a yod after the samekh".) מלך חשבן האמרי ואת ארצו | This day will I begin to deliver to thy face Sihon the Amorite, King of Heshbon, and his land. | 2:24 |
| ונצא לקראת סיחן יהצה ונכה עד לא השאר לי שרד | And we went forth against Sihon to Jahaz, and we smote him till we left him none to remain. | 2:32–33 |
| (Note: Ginsburg suggests that the forger listed Moab, Aroer, Jahaz, and Jabbok because these four locations are mentioned in the Mesha stele, omitting the other Masoretic locations, which are not.)ונלכד את כל ערו מערער אשר על שפת נחל ארנן עד הגלעד ועד נחל יבק | And we took all his cities from Aroer, which is by the brink of the river Arnon, unto Gilead, and unto the brook Jabbok. | 2:34–36 |
| הכל נתן אלהם אלהנו לפננו | God our God delivered all unto us. | 2:36 |
| ונפן ונעבר דרך נחל יבק | Then we turned and went up the way of the brook Jabbok. | 2:37 |
| ויאמר אלהם אלי לאמר עברם היום את גבל ארץ בני עמן | And God said unto me, saying, Ye are to pass this day the coast of the land of the children of Ammon. | 2:37 |
| לא הצרם ולא תתגר בם מלחמה כי לבני לט נתתי ארץ בני עמן ירשה | Ye shall not distress them nor meddle with them in war, because I have given unto the children of Lot the land of the children of Ammon for a possession. | 2:19 |
| רפאם מעלם ישבו בה והעמנם יקראו להם עזמזמם (Note: In form apparently a QaTaLTaL reduplication of the second and third radicals, however the root עזמ does not exist. Deut. 2:20 has זמזמים Zamzummim from זממ meaning "to devise" or connected to زَمْزَمَ "talk gibberish". Perhaps the same group as Gen. 14:5's זוזים Zuzzim, from זוז "to move". Cf. Gesenius' reconstruction of Azazel, עזלזל Azalzal.) וישמ[ד]ם אלהם מפנהם וישבו תחתם | The giants dwelt therein from of old, and the Ammonites called them Azam-zummim, but God destroyed them before them, and they dwelt in their stead. | 2:20 |
| ויאמר אלהם אלי שלח אנשם לרגל את יעזר ונלכד [את] יעזר ונשב בערי האמרי | And God said unto me, send men to spy out Jaazer, and we took Jaazer and dwelt in the cities of the Amorites. | Numbers 21:32 |
| ויצא עג מלך הבשן לקראתנו (Note: Original reads לקדאתנו, but this is a clear printing error.) למלחמה ונכהו עד לא השאר לו שרד ונלכד מאתם ששם עד כל כבל (Note: חבל in the MT, suggesting to Ginsburg etc. an author with a modern Ashkenazic accent wherein ח and כ are not distinguished.) הארגב בצרת חמה דלתם וברחם לבד מערי הפרזם הרבה מאד | And Og, the King of Bashan, went out against us to the battle, and we smote him until none was left to him remaining, and we took from him threescore cities, all the region of the Argob, cities fenced with walls, gates, and bars, beside unwalled towns a great many. | 3:1 |
| וכל ערי המשאר וכל הגלעד וכל הבשן עד סלכה ואדרעי . . . ארץ רפאם . . . גם הוא כי עג מלך הבשן מיתר הרפאם נשאר | And all the cities of the plain, and all Gilead, and all Bashan unto Salchah and Edrei, [which was also called] the land of the giants, for Og, King of Bashan, remained of the remnant of the giants. | 3:2–4 |
| ונפן ונסע נגבה ונשב מול בת פער | And we turned and journeyed southward and abode over against Beth Peor. | 3:29 |
| ויצאו בעת ההוא בנת מאב ונשי מדין לקראתם ותקראן [ל]כם לאכל מזבחהן (Note: Guthe reads מחג[*]הן for the same meaning.) ותאלו (Note: ותאכלו, misspelled.) מזבחהן ותשתו מנסחהן (Note: Another kaph/heth flip reflecting a modern accent. Here מנסכהן is intended.) ותשתחו לאלההן ותזנו את נשי המדנים ותצמדו לבעל פער ביום ההוא | And at that time of the daughters of Moab and the wives of the Midianites came out against you, and they called out to you to eat of their sacrifices, and ye did eat of their sacrifices and drank of their drink-offerings, and ye bowed down to their gods and committed whoredom with the wives of the Midianites, and ye joined yourselves to Baal-peor on that day. | Numbers 25 |
| וחרה אף אלהם עלכם ויגף בכם בעת ההוא מגפה גדלה | And the anger of God was kindled against you, and He smote you at that time with a great plague. | Numbers 25 |
| ושלחתי מכם אנשים ללחם את המדנים והכתם אתם לפי חרב ושבתם מאתם שבי הרבה (Note: Guthe parses שביה רבה.) למאד ותעצר המגפה | And I sent from among you men to fight the Midianites, and ye smote them with the edge of the sword, and ye took from them captives very many, and the plague was stayed. | Numbers 25 |
| ואתי צוה אלהם בעת ההוא ללמד אתכם חקם ומשפטם לעשתם בארץ אשר עברם (Note: אשר אתם עברם would be expected grammatically.) שמה לרשתה | And God commanded me at that time to teach you statutes and judgements that ye might do them in the land whither ye go over to possess it. | 4:1 |
| השמרו לכם לא תספו אל מצותו ולא תגרעו ממנו. | Take heed unto yourselves, ye shall not add to my statutes nor diminish therefrom. | 4:2 |
| השמרו לכם פן תשכחו ועשתם לכם פסל ותמנה תבנת כל סמל אשר בשמם ממעל וא[שר בארץ מ]תחת ואשר במים מתחת לארץ | Take heed unto yourselves, lest ye forget, and make you a graven image and similitude, the likeness of any figure which is in heaven above or on the [earth be]neath or in the waters under the earth, | 4:23 5:84:39(?) |
| וחרה אפי בכם והש[מדתי את]כם מהרה מן הארץ הטבה הזאת. | and His anger be kindled against you, and He destroy you speedily from this good land. | |
| וידע . . . היום ו[שמ]רת את חקתו ומצותו למען יטב לכם [ולמען] תארכו ימם על האדמה אשר אלהם אלהך נתן לכם | So know this day, and keep his statutes and his commands, that it may go well with you and that you may prolong your days upon the earth whom God, thy God gives to you. | |
| שמע ישראל אלהם אלהנו אלהם אחד ואהבת את אלהם אלהך בכל לבבך ובכל נפשך למאד מאד | Hear, O Israel, God our God is one God, [and thou shalt love] God thy God with all thine heart and will all thy soul exceedingly. | 6:4–5 |
| והיו הדברם האלה אשר אנך מצוך היום על לבבך ושננתם לבנך ודברת אתם בשבתך בבתך ובלכתך בדרך (ו)בשכבך (Note: Also transcribed without the waw.) ובקמך | And these words which I command thee this day shall be in thy heart, and thou shalt teach them diligently unto thy children, and thou shalt talk with them when thou sittest in the house, and when thou walkest by the way, and when thou liest down, (and) when thou liest down, and when thou risest up. | 6:6–7 |
| וקשרתם אתם לאות על ידך והיו לתתהות (Note: Intent unclear. MT reads לטטפות. Possibly evidence of a modern accent which did not distinguish between ט and ת.) בין עינך וכתב[תם] על מזזת בתך ושערך | And thou shalt bind [them] for a sign upon thine hand, they shall be as frontlets between thine eyes, and thou shalt write [them] upon the posts of thy house and on the thy gates. | 6:8–9 |
| כי אלהם כרת עמך ברת בחרב ביום הקהל ואנך עמדתי בין אלהם ובי[נכם] (Note: Guthe transcribes without the yod, in keeping with the scroll's defective pattern.) . . . בעת הזאת כי פחדת(ם) (Note: Only some transcriptions contain the final mem.) מפני האש ולא . . . ההר להגד לכם דבר אלהכם לאמר | For God made a covenant with thee in Horeb in the day of the assembly, and I stood between God and between you ... at that time, for ye were afraid by reason of the fire, and [went] not [up] ... to show you the word of your God, saying-- | 5:2–5 |
| אנך . אלהם . אלהך . אשר . החרתך (Note: Neubauer: "The usual verbs employed for liberating from Egypt and from the house of bondage, in the historical as well as in the prophetical books of the Bible, are either yatsa in the Hiphil form (as the received text has it here) or padah. The roots harah or hur are not used as verbs in the Old Testament, but only in the Targum, and in the Talmud, and then not in the Hiphil form, or with the particle min. It is difficult to understand how both texts of the Decalogue, in Exodus as well as in Deuteronomy, should have no trace of such a word, but employ uniformly instead of it the root yatsa," Ginsburg: "[It] is not taken from the Targum, but from ancient Hebrew coins, where חרות, liberty, liberation, is used in the legend.") . מארץ . מצרם . מבת . עבדם . לא יהיה . לכם (Note: Neubauer: "In all the other Commandments of the Moabite text, Israel is addressed in the second person singular; why, then, do we find in the First Commandment 'Ye shall not have,' 'Ye shall not bow down'?'") . אלהם . אחרם . לא תעשה . לכם . פסל . וכל . תמנה . אשר . בשמם . ואשר . בארץ . מתחת . ואשר . במים . מתחת . לארץ . לא תשתחו . להם . ולא תעבדם . אנך . אלהם . אלהך . | I am God, thy God, who liberated you from the land of Egypt, from the house of bondage. Ye shall have no other God. Ye shall not make for you any hewn image, or any likeness of anything that is in the sky above, or that is in the earth beneath, or that is in the waters beneath the earth: Ye shall not bow down yourself to them, nor serve them: I am God, thy God. | 5:6–9 |
| שת . ימם . עשתי . את השמם . ואת הארץ . וכל . אשר . בם . ושבתי (Note: Neubauer: "[There is a grammatical mistake] in the Second Commandment, which refers to the keeping of the Sabbath. It runs thus: 'Sanctify . . . for in six days I have made the heaven and the earth, and all that is therein, and rested the seventh day, therefore rest thou, also thee, and the cattle, and all that thou hast. 'ושבתי' 'and I rested,' is ungrammatical; it ought to be 'ואשבת'. Evidently the Moabite writer did not make use of Dr. Driver's excellent work on the Hebrew tenses. The root shaboth does not mean 'to rest,' but 'to cease from work,' and in this sense only it is found in the Old Testament. The forger made a blunder in not leaving the root noah as in the received text.") . .ביום . השבעי . על . כן . תשבת . גם . אתה .ובהמתך (Note: Neubauer: "The word gam ought to be repeated according to classical Hebrew: cf. Exod. [xii], 31, 32, and elsewhere.") . וכל . אשר . לך (Note: Neubauer: "The expressions 'and all thou hast' and 'anything that is his' are not classical Hebrew.") . אנך . אלהם . אלהך . | In six days I made sky and earth, and all that in them is, and I rested the seventh day: so you also will rest, you, and your cattle and all that you have. I am God, thy God. | 5:13–14 |
| כבד. את אבך . ואת אמך (. למען . יארכן . ימך) (Note: Present in one of two MSS. Ginsburg writes, "This is either due to an omission on the part of the scribe, or indicates that it is intended as a different recension".) . אנך . אלהם . אלהך . | Honor your father and your mother (that thy days may be prolonged). I am God, thy God. | 5:16 |
| לא תר[צח. את נ]פשי. אחך. (Note: Neubauer: "This is not Hebrew, as can be seen from the passage urzaho nefesh (Deut. xxii, 26). Here a clumsy use has been made of the Chaldee paraphrase.") אנך . אלהם . אלהך. | Thou shalt not kill the soul of your brother. I am God, thy God. | 5:17–19 |
| לא תנאף . את אשת . רעך . אנך . אלהם . אלהך . | Thou shalt not commit adultery with the wife of your neighbor. I am God, thy God. | 5:17–19 |
| לא תגנב . את הן (Note: Neubauer: "Hon is not to be found in the Pentateuch, the word hail being employed there instead of it in the sense of 'wealth'.") . אחך (Note: This is the line in its final form. However, an earlier draft had been struck through, reading: לא . . . מן . מ . . הן . רעך . אנך . אלהם . אלהך . Ginsburg notes, "On maturer consideration the forger was evidently displeased with him Hebrew composition of this commandment. He therefore cancelled it, and substituted for it what is now his sixth commandment. This is one of the strongest of the proofs which brand the document as a forgery".) . אנך . אלהם . אלהך . | Thou shalt not steal the property of your brother. I am God, thy God. (Note: This is the line in its final form. However, an earlier draft had been struck through, translated: "[Thou shalt] not [steal] aught of . . . the property of thy neighbor. I am God, thy God." Ginsburg notes, "On maturer consideration the forger was evidently displeased with him Hebrew composition of this commandment. He therefore cancelled it, and substituted for it what is now his sixth commandment. This is one of the strongest of the proofs which brand the document as a forgery".) | 5:17–19 |
| לא תשבע . בשמי . לשקר . כי . אנך . אקנא (Note: Neubauer calls this use of kana "impossible".) . את עון . אבת (Note: One MS has אבם.) . על . בנם . על . שלשם . ועל .רבעם . לנשא (Note: Neubauer: "I have already pointed out the strange—I should rather say the impossible —use of the root kana; but the expression lenosey is rabbinical; in classical Hebrew we would expect laish asher yissa. The word eduth, 'witness,' is equally a rabbinical form. Such is the grammatical and idiomatic character of the new Moabite text of the Decalogue".) . שמי . לשקר . אנך . אלהם . אלהך | Thou shalt not swear by my name falsely for I will visit with zealous anger the iniquity of the father upon the children to the third and fourth generation of those who take my name falsely. I am God, thy God. | 5:11, 9 |
| לא תענו (Note: Ginsburg "The expression תענו, bear false witness . . . is not the plural from ענה . . . but is intended to be the second person singular from the root ענו, in imitation of the archaic form on the Moabite stone, where it occurs twice.") . באחך . עדת (Note: Neubauer: "The word eduth . . . is a Rabbinical form." Eduth is found Biblically meaning "law" or "testimony (of things)" and not the later "testimony (of people)". Dershowitz suggests the reading adath for "judicial decision" (construct); this word is completely unattested.) . שקר . אנך .אלהם . אלהך . | Thou shalt not bear false witness against your brother. I am God, thy God. | 5:11 |
| לא. תחמד . אשת .... עבדו . ואמתו . וכל . אשר . לו . אנך . אלהם . אלהך. | Thou shalt not desire the wife of . . . your brother, his man-servant, or his maidservant, or anything that is his. I am God, thy God. | 5:18 |
| לא תשנא . את אחך . בל[בבך] . אנך .אלהם . אלהך. את עשרת הדברם האלה דבר אלהם ... | Thou shalt not hate your brother in your heart. I am God, thy God. These ten words (or commandments) God spake ... | 5:19 |
| שמע ישראל אתם עברם היום את הירדן לבא לרשת גוים רבם ועצמם ערם גדלת ובצרת חמה | Hear, O Israel, ye are to pass over Jordan this day to go in to possess many nations and mighty ones, cities great and with fenced walls | 9:1 |
| לא תאמרו בלבבכם רבם המה הגוים האלה לא נכל להרשם לא תרא מהם | Speak not ye in your hearts, these nations are many, we cannot dispossess them, Thou shalt not be afraid of them. | 9:4 |
| זכר את אשר עשה אלהם לפרעה ולכל מצרם כן יעשה אלהם לכל איבך כי אלהם הוא העבר לפנך אש אכלה הוא (Note: Original is misprinted חוה) הוא ישמדם ויכנעם מחרה לפנך | Remember what God did unto Pharaoh and unto all Egypt, so shall God do unto all thine enemies, for God it is He which goeth over thee, He is a consuming fire, He shall destroy them, and He shall bring them down before thy face quickly. | 9:3 |
| גם את ה..צרעת ישלח אלהם בם עד אבד יאבד הנסתרם הנשארם מלפנך | Moreover God will send the hornet among them, until they that hide themselves and are left before thee be utterly destroyed. | |
| רק אם תשמרו את מצותו ומשפטו וחקתו אשר אנך מצוך היום | Only if ye keep his commandments and His judgements and His statutes which I command thee this day. | |
| וידעת היום כי לא בצדקתך אלהם אלהך נתן לפנך את הארץ הזאת לרשתה כי עם קשה ערף הית (Note: Misprinted חית) מן היום אשר יצאת ממצרם עד היום | So understand this day, that God, thy God gives not before you this land on account of your righteousness to possess it, for you have been a stiff-necked people from the day that you did depart out of Egypt until this day. | 9:12–13 |
| ממרם היתם את אלהם אלהך . בחרב ביום עלתי ההר לקחת את שני לחת האבנם ועלהם כתבם כל הדברם אשר דבר אלהם עמכם בהר מתך האש ביום הקהל | You have been rebellious against God, thy God. In Horeb on the day when I had gone up into the mount to receive the two tablets of stone, and on them were written all the words that God spoke with you in the mount out of the midst of the fire in the day of the assembly. | 9:7–10 |
| קצפתם את אלהם ועשתם לכם עגל מסכה | You provoked your God to wrath, and you made you a molten calf. | 9:16 |
| ואתנפל לפני אלהם בהר הבער כאש . . . ושני לחת בידי | And I fell down before God in the mount that burned with fire: and the two tablets were in my hands. | 9:15 |
| וארא חטאתכם ואשבר את שני לחת לעינכם ואתפלל בעדכם בעת ההוא ארבעם יום וארבעם ללה | And I beheld your sins, and I broke the two tablets before your eyes, and I prayed for you at the same time forty days and forty nights. | 9:16 |
| ובתבערה ובמסה ובקברת התאוה ממרים היתם את אלהכם | And at Taberah, and at Massah, and at Kivroth-hattah'avah, you rebelled against your God. | 9:22 |
| בעת ההוא אמר אלהם אלי פסל לך שני לחת אבנם כראשנם ועלה אלי ההרה | At that time God said to me, Cut out two tablets of stone like to the first, and come up to me into the mount. | 10:1 |
| ואעל ההרה ושני [ה]לחת בידי. ויכתכ אלהם על הלחת את עשרת הדברם אשר דבר אלכם בהר ביום הקהל ויתנם אלי והנם בארן אשר עשיתי | And I went up into the mount, having the two tablets in my hand. And God wrote on the tablets the Ten Words that he spoke to you in the mount in the day of the assembly. And he gave them to me, and look, they are in the ark that I had made. | 10:3–4 |
| ובקדש ברנע באמר אלי אלהם עלו ורשו את הארץ ממרם היתם את אלהכם ולא עלתס ולא שמעתם בקלו ויאמר אלהם להשמדכם | And at Kadesh-barnea when God said to me, Go up and possess the land; you rebelled against your God and you went not up nor listened. And God said he would destroy you. | 9:23–25 |
| ואתפלל בעדכם בעמד בהר ארבעם יום וארבעם ללה בעדכם וישמע אלהם גם בפעם ההוא ולא השחת אתכם כרגע | So I prayed for you when I stayed in the mount forty days and forty nights. And God listened at that time also, and he did not destroy you in a moment. | 9:26 |
| לא בצדקתך אלהך נתן לך כח לעשת חיל . . . [רק חשק אלהם] באבתכם לאהבה אתם ויבחר בזרעם אחרהם מכל העמם [כי אלהם] אלהכם הוא אלה אלהם ואדני האדנם האל הגבר והנרא | Not for your righteousness has your God given you power to get wealth. Only God had a delight in your fathers to love them, and he chose their seed after them, even above all peoples or God, thy God is God of all gods, and Governor of governors, a mighty God, and a terrible one. | 9:5–6 |
| הוא תהלתך והוא אשר עשה אתך את הגדלת ואת הנראת . בשבעם נפש ירדו אבתכם למצרם [ו]עתה הית לעם עצם ורב . | He is your praise, and he it is who has done for you these great and terrible things. Your fathers went down into Egypt with seventy souls; and now you have become a people mighty and populous. | 10:21 |
| כי אך [אם] תשמר[ו את] כל המצוה אשר אנך מצוה היום לעשת לאהבה את אלהכם ללכת בכל דרכו ובכל חקתו והרש אלהם את כל אנשי המקם כל אשר תדרך כף רגלכם בו | For if you will only keep all the commands that I command this day to do, to love your God, to walk in all his ways, and in all his statutes, then God will drive out all the men of the place, and every place upon which the soles of your feet will tread. | 11:24 |
| לא יתיצב אי[ש] לפניכם כ[י פ]חדכם ומראכם יהיה על פני כל הארץ אש[ר ת]דרכו בו | There will no man be able to stand before you; for the fear of you and the dread of you will be upon all the land that you will tread upon. | 11:25 |
| ראה אנך נתן לפנכם היום ברכה וקללה את הברכה אם תשמעו אל מצות[י וחקתי] והקללה אם לא תשמעו וסרתם מהדרך אשר אנך מצוה אתכם היום | Look, I set before you this day a blessing and a curse; a blessing, if you obey my commands and my statutes, a curse, if thou shalt not obey but turn aside out of the way that I command you this day. | 11:26–28 |
| ן[היה כי י]באך אלהם אל הארץ אשר אתה בא שמה לרשתה ונתת את הברכה על הר [גרזם] והקללה על הר עבל הלא [המה] בעבר הירדן דרך מבא השמש בארץ הכנעני [נג]ד גלגל אצל אלני מרא | And it will come to pass, when God has brought you into the land where you go to possess it, that you will put the blessing upon Mount Gerizim and the curse upon Mount Eyval. Are they not on the other side of the Yarden, by the way where the sun goes down, in the land of the Kena'anim, over against Gilgal, beside the plains of Moreh? | 11:29–30 |
| ואלה יעמדו על ה[ר עבל] ראובן זבולן [ו]גד אשר דן ונפתלי . ואלה יעמדו על הר גרזם שמען ויהודה ושכר מנשה ואפרם ובנימין | And these will stand upon Mount Eyval; Reuben, Zebulun and Gad, Asher, Dan and Naphtali. And these will stand upon Mount Gerizim; Simeon, and Judah, and Issachar, Manasseh and Ephraim and Benjamin. | 27:12–13 |
| ועמדו הלוים נגד הר גרזם ו[ענ]ו ואמרו בקל רם | And the Levites will stand before Mount Gerizim and will speak, and say with a loud voice: | 27:14 |
| ברך האיש אשר יאהב אלהם אלהנו ולו לבדו ישתחו ואתו לבדו יעבר וענו כל הע[ם] ואמרו אמן. ברך הא[יש אשר יקדש את י]ום השבעי וישבת בו ויענו כל העם ואמרו אמן | Blessed be the man who loves God, thy God and bows down to him only and serves him only. And all the people will answer and say, Amen. Blessed be the man who consecrates the seventh day and rests thereon. And all the people will answer and say, Amen. | |
| ברך האיש מכבד אבו ואמו וענו כל העם ואמרו אמן ברך [ה]איש אשר לא יקם ולא יטר את נפש אחו וענו אמן . ברך האיש אשר לא יטמא את אשת רעהו וענו כל העם ואמרו אמן | Blessed be the man who honors his father and his mother. And all the people will answer and say, Amen. Blessed be the man who avenges not nor bears any grudge against the soul of his brother. And all the people will answer and say, Amen. Blessed be the man who defiles not the wife of his neighbor. And all the people will answer and say, Amen. | |
| ברך האיש אשר לא [ינ]ה את רעהו וענו [כל העם ואמרו אמן . ב]רך האיש אשר לא ישבע ב [ש]מי לשקר וענו כל העם ואמרו אמן ברך האיש אשר לא יכחש ול[א י]שקר ברעהו וענו כל העם ואמרו אמן . | Blessed be the man who oppresses not his neighbor. And all the people will answer and say, Amen. Blessed be the man who swears not by my name falsely. And all the people will answer and say, Amen. Blessed be the man who deals not falsely nor lies against his neighbor. And all the people will answer and say, Amen. | |
| ברך [האיש] אשר לא נשא עינו אל ח[ר]כש רעהו וענו כל העם ואמרו אמן . ברך האיש אשר יאהב את רעהו [וענו] כל העם ואמרו אמן ברך האיש אשר יקם את כל דברי התרה ה[זאת ל]עשת [א]תם וענו כל העם אמן | Blessed be the man who sets not his eye upon his neighbor's goods. And all the people will answer and say, Amen. Blessed be the man who loves his neighbor. And all the people will answer and say, Amen. Blessed be the man who confirms all the words of this Law to do them. And all the people will answer and say, Amen. | |
| ויספו הלוים ויענו [ויאמרו ב]קל רם ראה אם שמע תשמע בקל אלהך לשמר לעש[ת א]ת כל מצותו ובאו עלך כל הברכת האלה ברך אתה בער ברך אתה בשדה | And you will answer further and say with a loud voice. Look, if you will hearken diligently to the voice of your God, to observe and to do all his commands, then all these blessings will come upon you. Blessed will you be in the city, and blessed will you be in the field. | 28:3 |
| ברך טנאך ושארתך ברך פרי בטנך ופרי אדמתך שגר [א]לפך ועשתרת צאנך ברך אתה בבאך וברך אתה בצאתך | Blessed will be your basket and your store. Blessed will be the fruit of your body, and the fruit of your ground, the increase of your kine and the flocks of your sheep. Blessed will you be when you come in, and blessed will you be when you go out. | 28:4–6 |
| יתן אלהך את איבך נגפם לפנך יצו אלהם את הברכה בכל מעשה ידך יקמך אלהם לו לעם קדש וראו כל עמי הארץ ויראו ממך | Your God will cause your enemies to be smitten before your face. God will command the blessing upon all the works of your hand. God will establish you a people set-apart to himself. And all the people of the earth will see and will be afraid of you. | 28:7–9 |
| יפתח אלהם לך את השמם לתת מ[טר] ארצך בע[ת]ו ו[ה]ל[ו]ת גוים [רב]ם ו[אתה ל]א [ת]לוה והית [למעלה] ולא תהיה [ל]מטה | God will open to you your sky to give the rain to your land in his season; and you will lend to many nations, and thou shalt not borrow. And you will be above, and thou shalt not be beneath ... | 28:12 |
| ויסבו הל[ו]ים את פ[נ]הם [נ]גד הר עבל ויענו ו[יאמ]רו [ב]קל ר[ם] | And the Levites will turn their faces towards Mount Eyval, and will answer and say with a loud voice: | 28:14 |
| ארר ה[אי]ש אשר [יעש]ה פ[ס]ל ומסכה מעש[ה] י[ד]י חרש וענו כל העם ו[אמרו א]מן אר[ר האיש א]שר יעשה מלאכה ביום השבעי לחללו וענו כל העם וא[מרו אמן] | Cursed be the man who makes any graven or molten image, the work of the hands of the craftsman. And all the people will answer and say, Amen. Cursed be the man who does any work on the seventh day to profane it. And all the people will answer and say, Amen. | 27:14–26 |
| ארר מקלה אבו ואמו וענו כל העם ואמרו אמן : ארר מכה רעהו בסתר וענו כל העם ואמרו אמן | Cursed be he who sets light by his father or his mother. And all the people will answer and say, Amen. Cursed be he who smites his neighbor secretly. And all the people will answer and say, Amen. | 27:14–26 |
| ארר האיש אשר יקרב אל כל שאר בשרו ואשר ינאף את אשת רעהו ואשר יבעל עם כל בהמה (Note: בעל is transitive in Biblical Hebrew and never used with the preposition עם. It is also not used to denote intercourse in Biblical Hebrew, only possession and marriage, though it acquires that meaning in Rabbinic Hebrew. Cf. Deut. 27:20's שכב, which the Bible often uses with the preposition עם and to denote intercourse.) וענו כל העם ואמרו אמן : ארר מ[ס]ג גבל רעהו וענו כל העם ואמרו אמן | Cursed be the man who approaches to any who is near of kin to him or who commits adultery with the wife of his neighbor, or who lies with any manner of beast. And all the people will answer and say, Amen. Cursed be he who removes his neighbor's landmark. And all the people will answer and say, Amen. | 27:14–26 |
| ארר האיש אשר ישבע בשמי לשקר וענו כל העם ואמרו אמן : ארר לקח שחד לה[עד עד] שקר בעמתו וענו כל העם ואמרו אמן | Cursed be the man who swears by my name falsely. And all the people will answer and say, Amen. Cursed be he who takes reward to testify falsely against his neighbor. And all the people will answer and say, Amen. | 27:14–26 |
| ארר האיש אשר י[שא עינ]ו אל אשת רעהו ואל בתו ואל אמ[תו] ולכל אשר לו וענו כל העם ואמרו אמן : ארר האיש אשר ישנא את אחו בלבו וענו כל העם ואמרו אמן : ארר האיש אשר לא י[ק]ם את כל דברי הת[ר]ה ה[זא]ת לעשת אתם וענו כל העם ואמרו אמן | Cursed be the man who lifts up his eye to his neighbor's wife or to his daughter or to his maidservant or to anything that is his. And all the people will answer and say, Amen. Cursed be the man who hates his brother in his heart. And all the people will answer and say, Amen. Cursed be he who confirms not all the words of this Law to do them. And all the people will answer and say, Amen. | 27:14–26 |
| וי[ס]פו הלוים לקרא בקל רם ויאמרו , והיה אם לא תשמע בקל אלהך [לש]מר לעשת את כל מצותו ו[ח]קתו ובאו עלך כל הקללת האלה | And the Levites also will call with a loud voice and say, And it will come to pass, if thou wilt not hearken to the voice of your God, to observe to do all his commands and his statutes; that all these curses will come upon you. | |
| ארר אתה בער ואר[ר] אתה בשדה ארר [ט]נאך ושארתך ארר פרי בטנך ופרי אדמתך שגר אלפך ועשתרת [צאנך] ארר אתה בבאך וארר אתה בצאתך | Cursed will you be in the city, and cursed will you be in the field. Cursed will be your basket and your store. Cursed will be the fruit of your body, and the fruit of your land, the increase of your kine, and the flocks of your sheep. Cursed will you be when you come in, and cursed will you be when you go out. | 28:16–19 |
| יתנך אלהם נ[גף לפ]ני איב[ך] ישלח אלהם את המארה בכל מעשה ידך יתנך אלהם לשמה [ל]משל ולשננה בכל עמי הארץ יעצר אלהם את השמם | God will cause you to be smitten before your enemies. God will send cursing upon all the works of your hand. God will make you a scandal, a proverb, and a byword, among all nations of the earth. God will restrain the skies. | 28:30–45 |
| הגר אש[ר בקר]בך יעלה מעלה מעלה וא[תה] תרד מטה מטה יליך ואת[ה לא תלו]נו יאבד וי[שמ]ד אלהם את[ך מעל פני הא]דמה אשר אתה בא ש[מ]ה [ל]רשתה | The stranger who is within you will get up very high above you; and you will come down very low. He will lend to you, and thou shalt not lend to him. God will make you perish, and will consume you from off the face of the land, wherever you may go-forth to possess. | 28:30–45 |
| כן מאה ועש[ר]ם [שנה אנך ה]יום לא אכל לצאת ולבא לפנכם ואלהם אמר אלי לא תעבר את הירדן יהשע העמד לפנך [הוא] יעבר את הירדן והוא יבא אתכם אל הארץ הטבה אשר .... . שמה לרשתה חזקו ואמצו אל תראו ואל תחפדו כי אלהם אלהכם הוא ההלך . . . . הזאת . . . לפנכם . . . . . . כי | I am an hundred and twenty years old this day; I can no more go out come in before you. And God said to me, thou shalt not go over this Yarden. Joshua, who stands before you, he will go over Yarden, and he will come with you to the good land where you go to possess. Be strong and of a good courage, fear not, nor be afraid: for God, thy God he is the one who goes before you. | 34:7 |
| . אלה הדברם אשר צוה משה לכל בני ישראל על פי יהוה בערבת מאב לפני מתו | These are the words that Moshe commanded all the children of Israel, according to the mouth of the LORD, in the plains of Moab before his death. | 33:1, 34:5 |

== Gallery ==
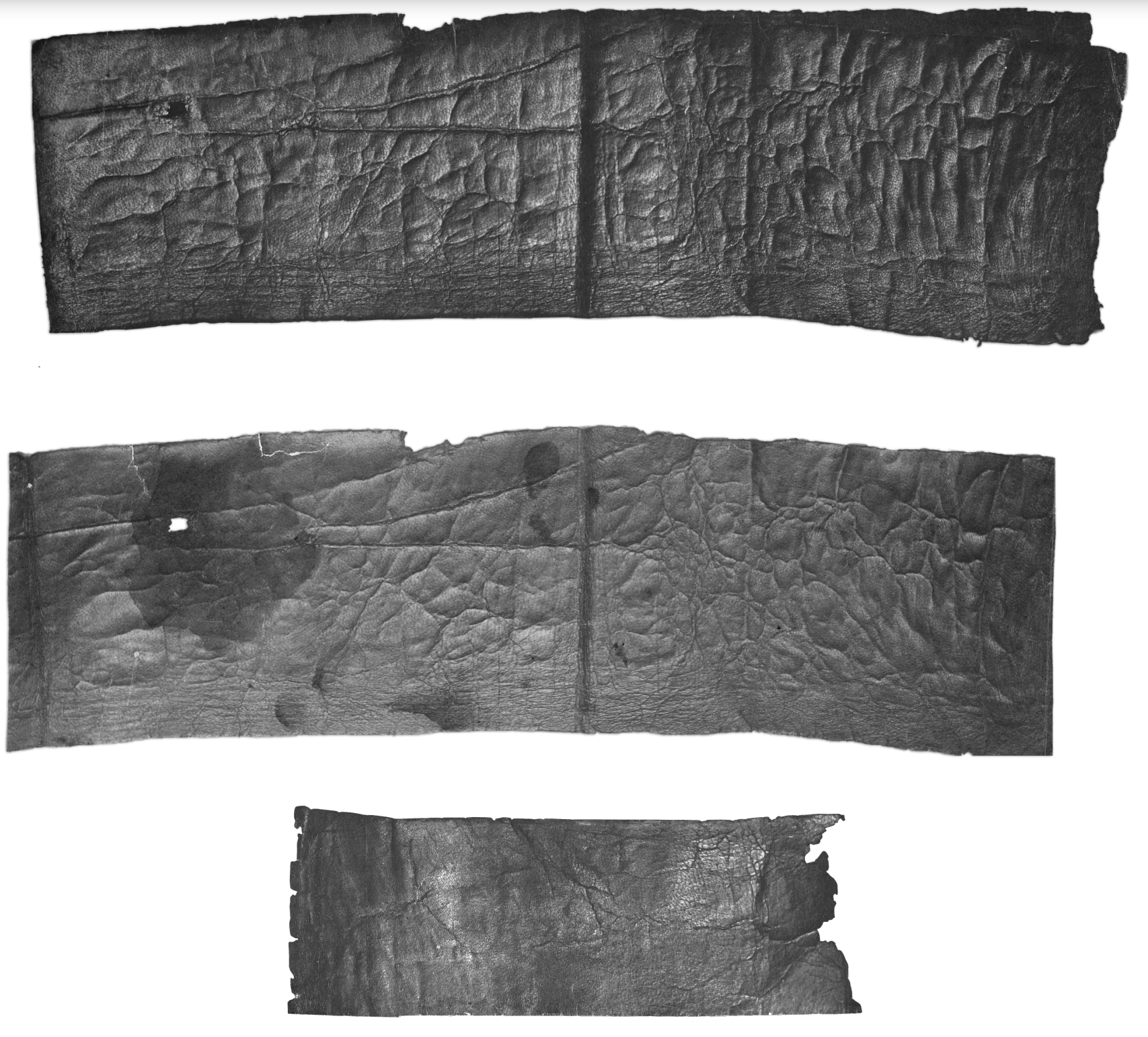
Two photographs of Fragment E, columns 1–2, and one unknown fragment. In the top image, Fragment E is folded in half, with column 4 (verso) partially visible behind column 1 (recto). The image of the unknown fragment is cropped at the bottom.

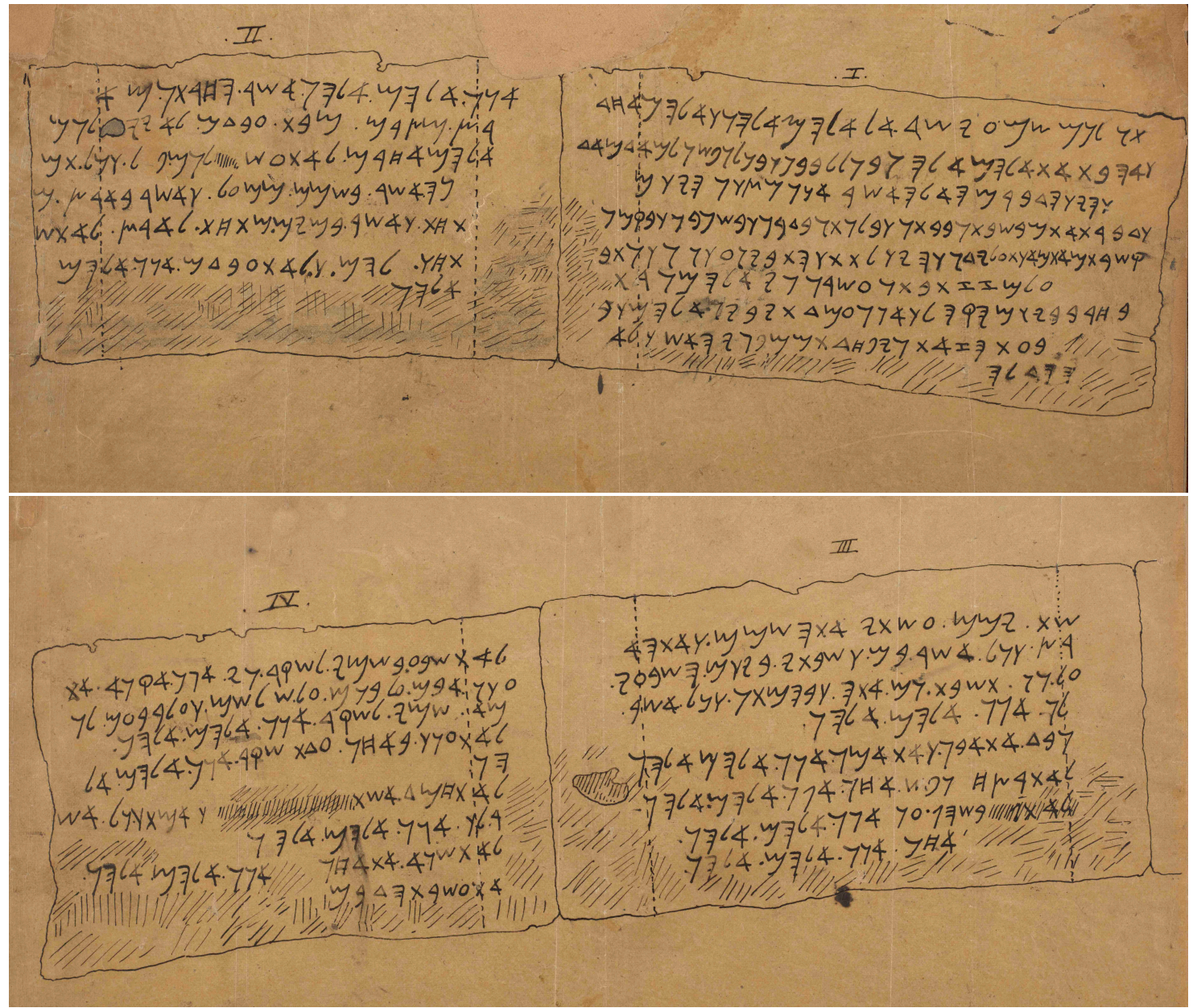
Ginsburg's sketch of Fragment E

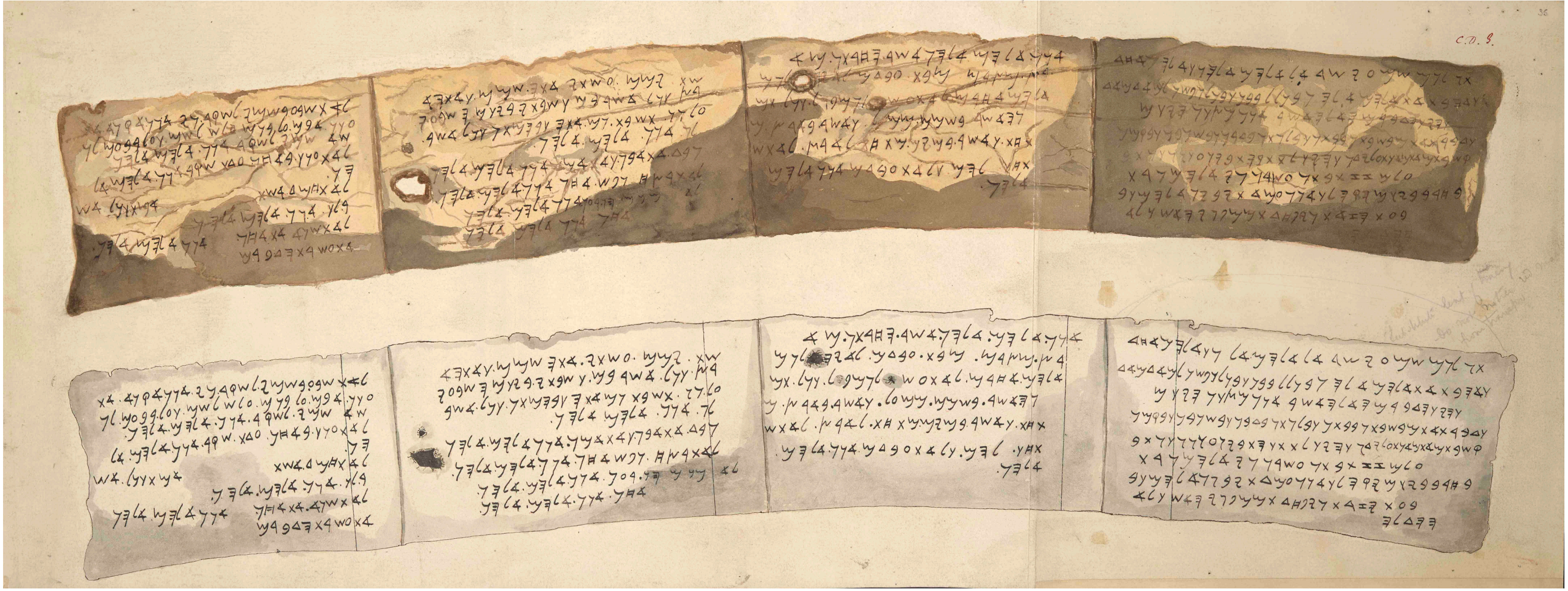
Drawing of Fragment E prepared by Dangerfield Lithography (London, 1883), in consultation with Ginsburg

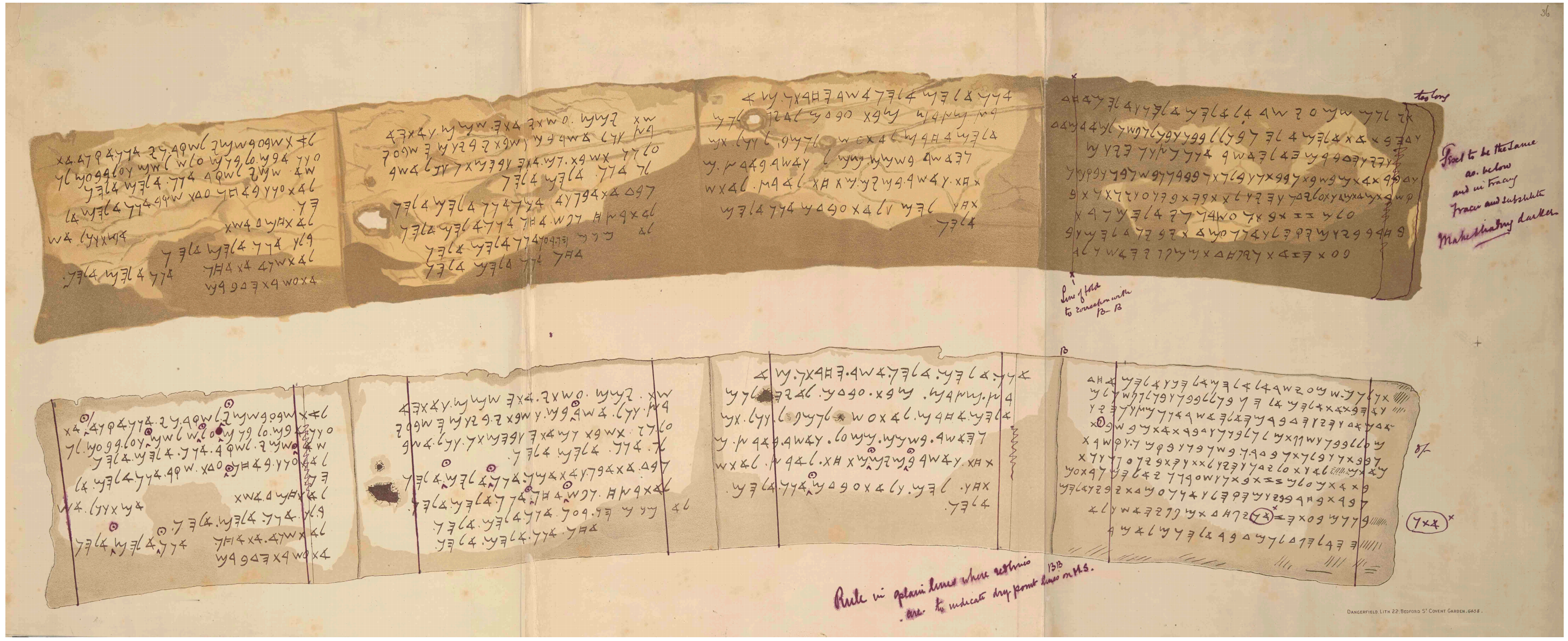
Drawing of Fragment E prepared by Dangerfield Lithography (London, 1883), in consultation with Ginsburg

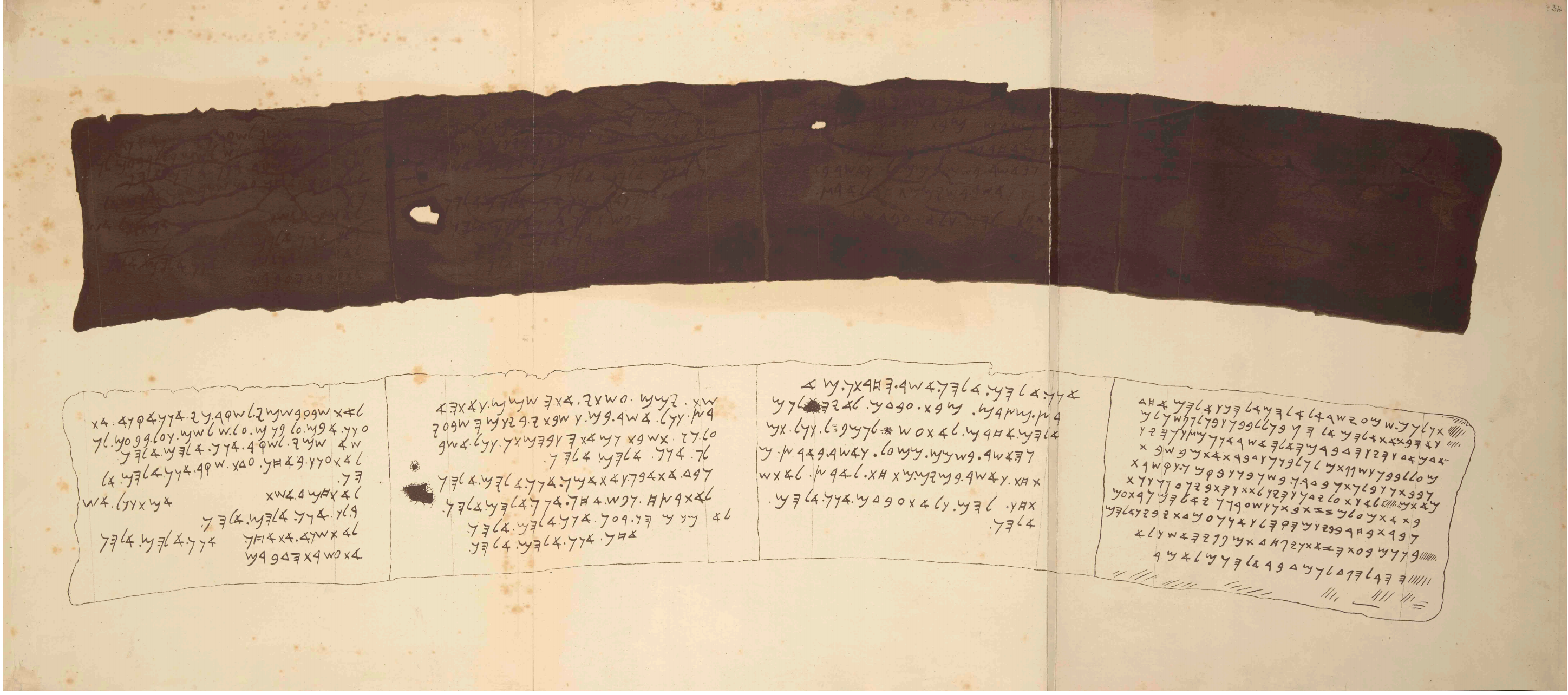
Drawing of Fragment E prepared by Dangerfield Lithography (London, 1883), in consultation with Ginsburg

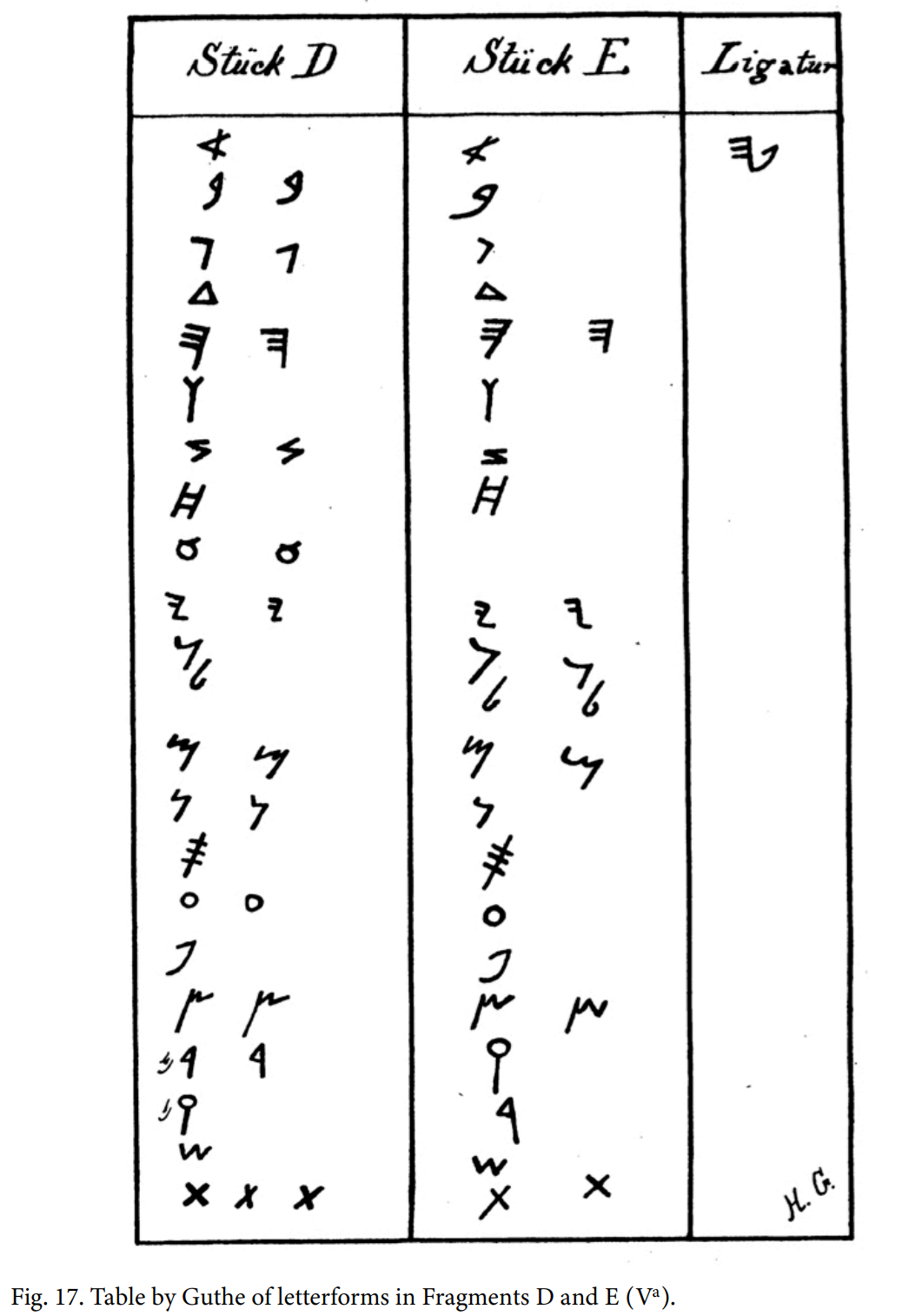
Table by Guthe of letterforms in Fragments D and E

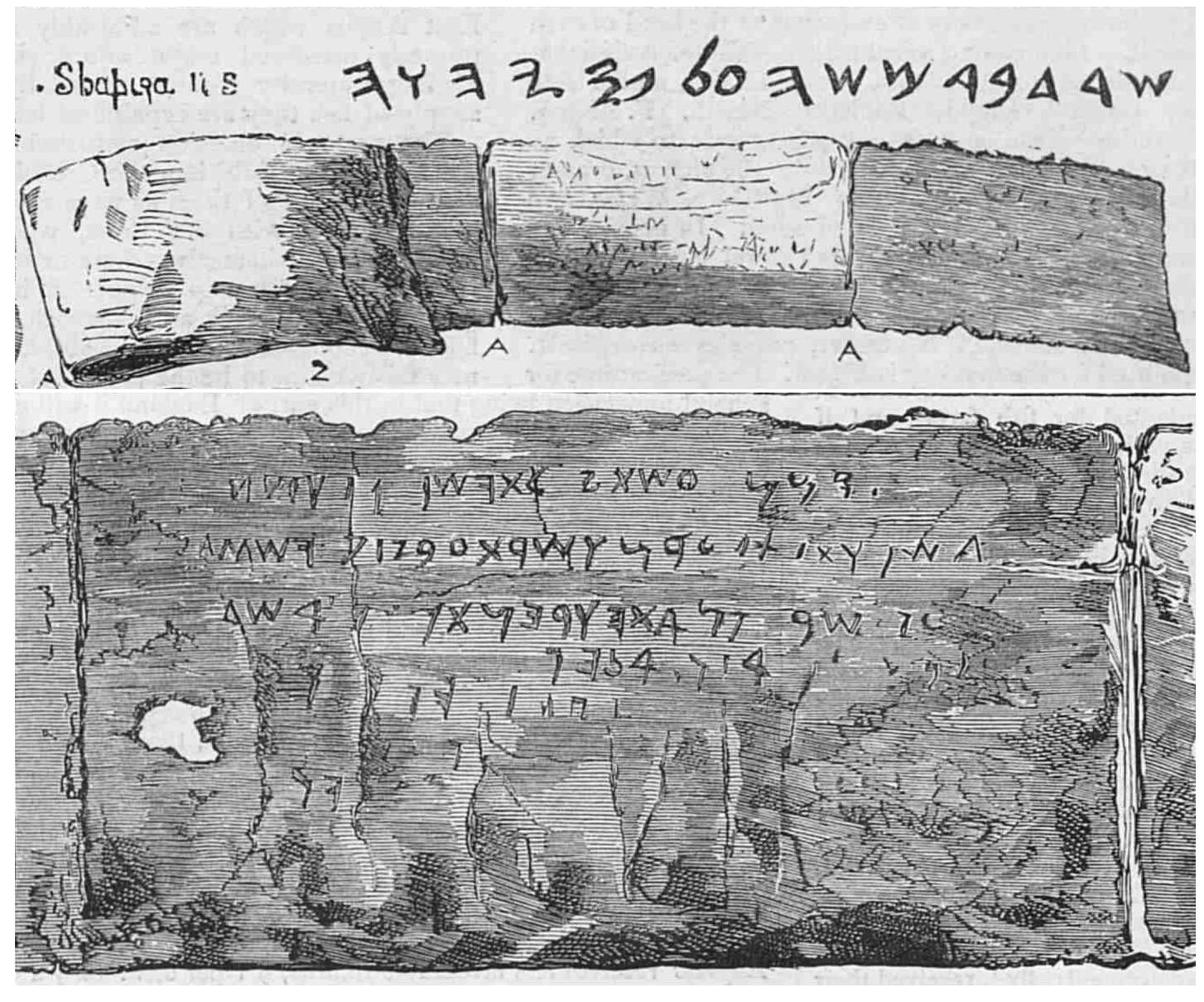
Drawings of Fragment E from The Graphic (1883). Column 3 is shown below. The text on top is from Fragment A, column 1

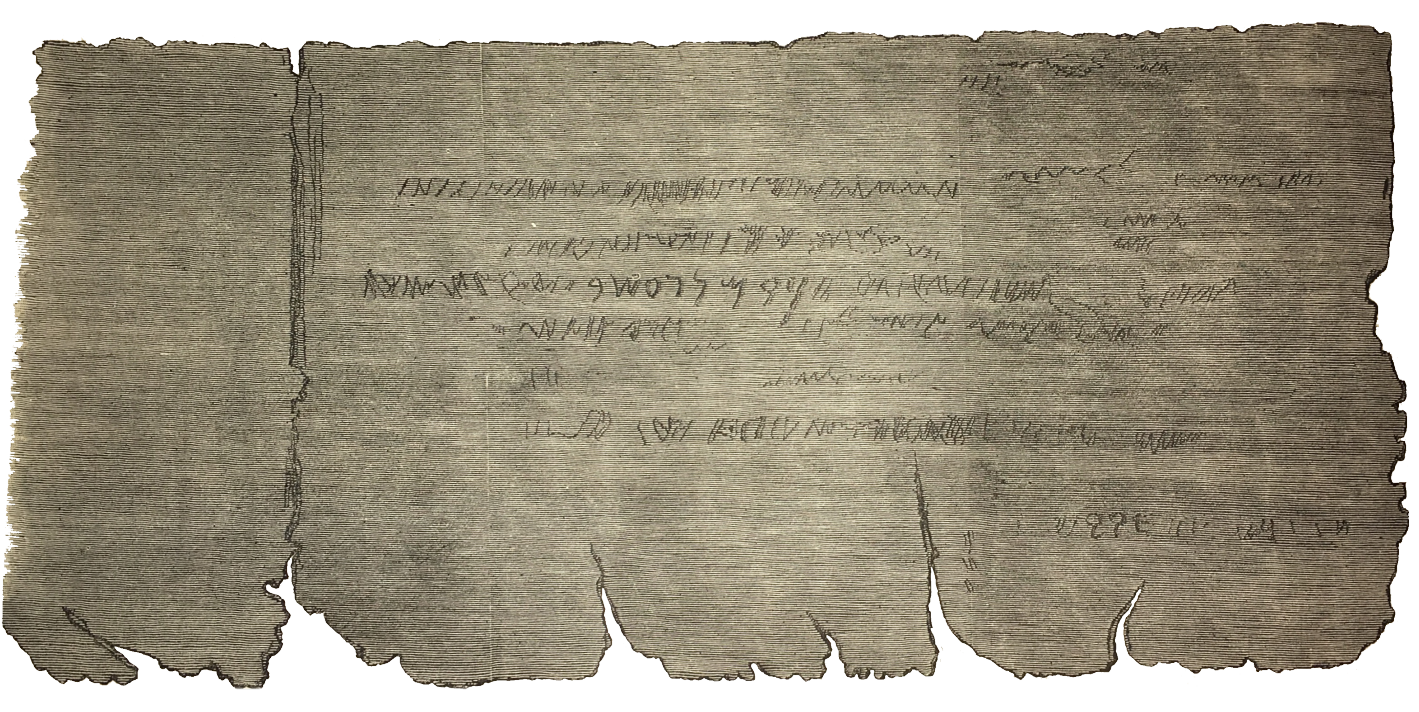
Drawing of fragment from The Illustrated London News (1883)

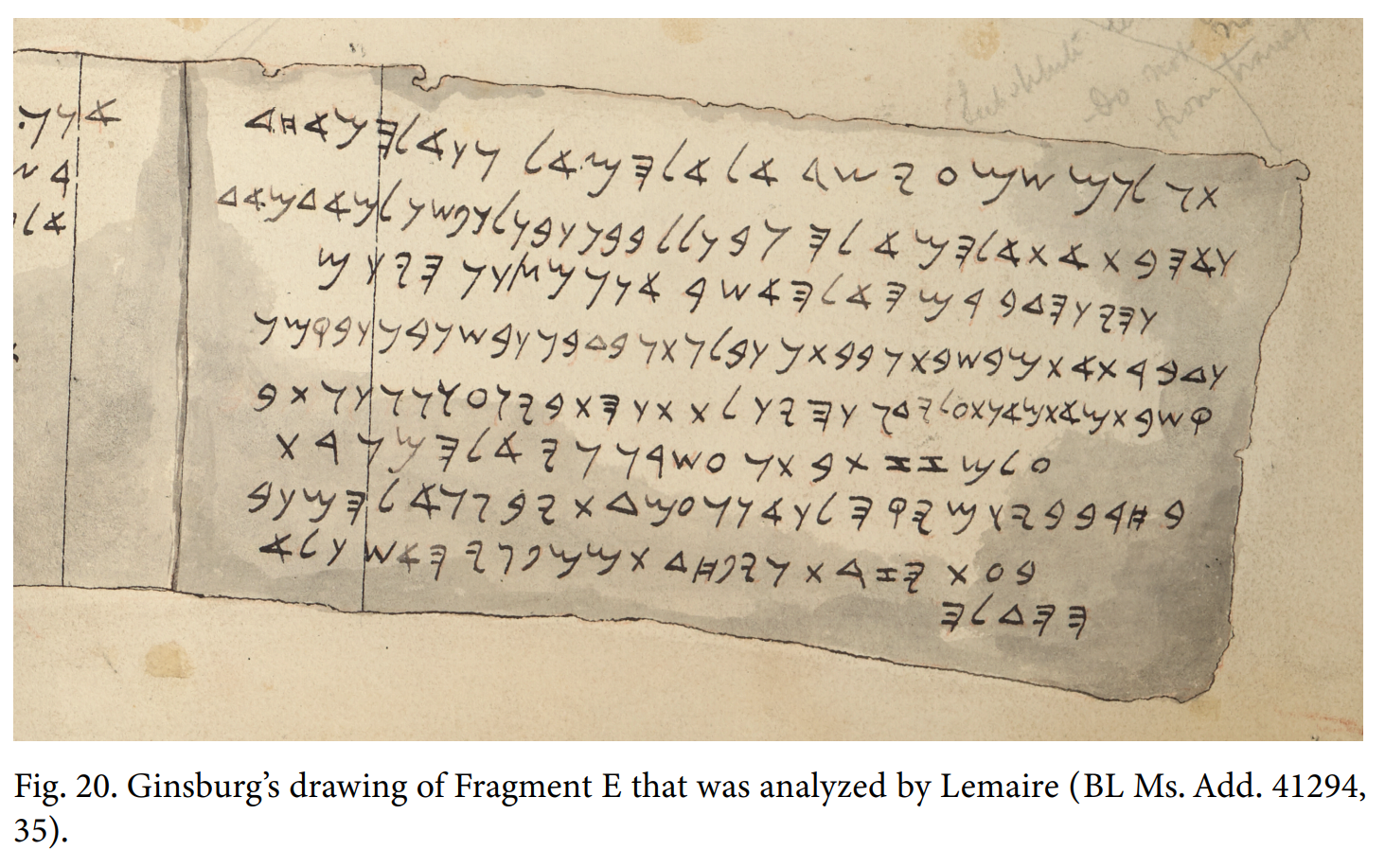
Ginsburg's drawing of Fragment E that was analyzed by Lemaire (BL Ms. Add. 41294, 35)

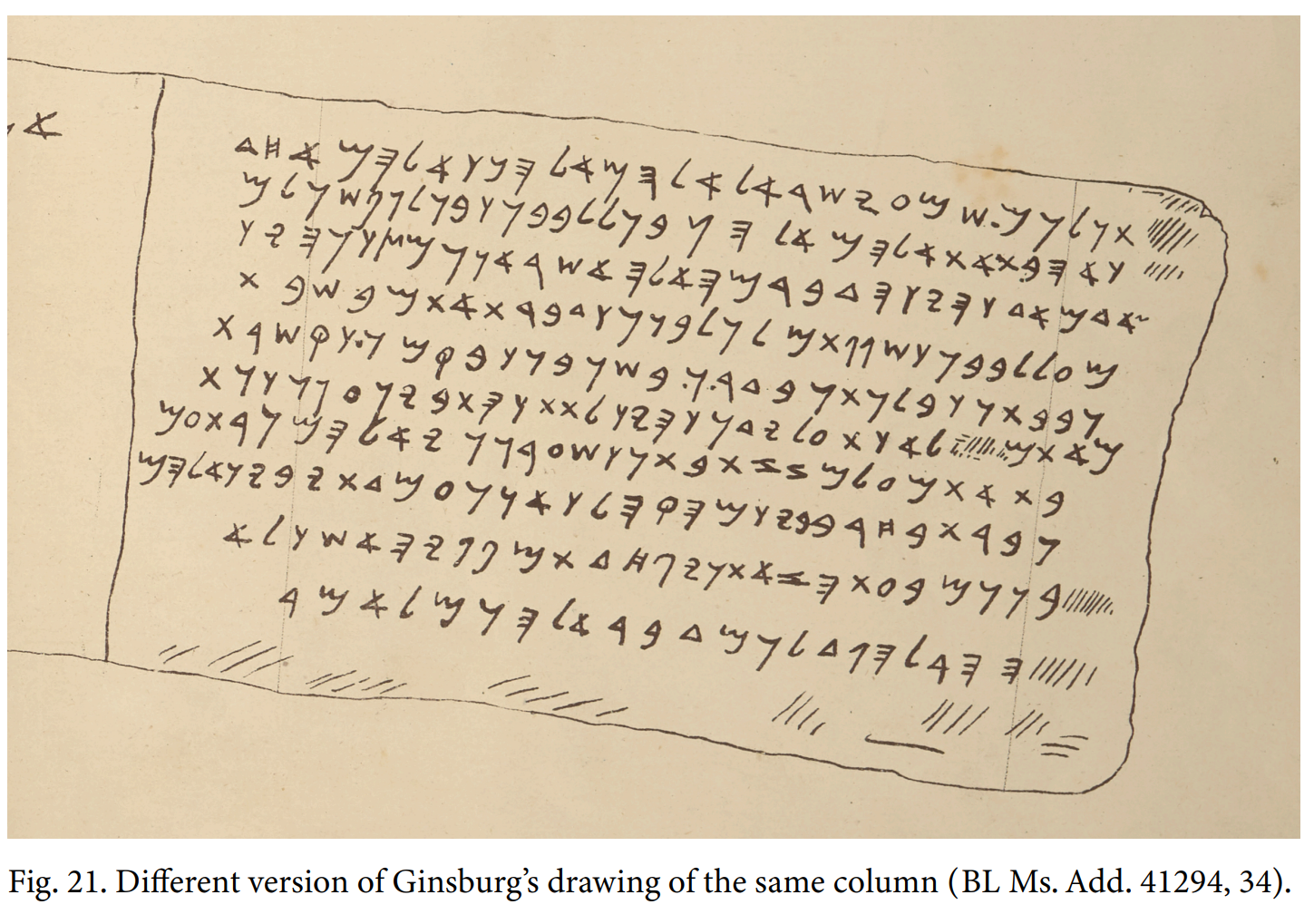
Different version of Ginsburg's drawing of the same column (BL Ms. Add. 41294, 34)

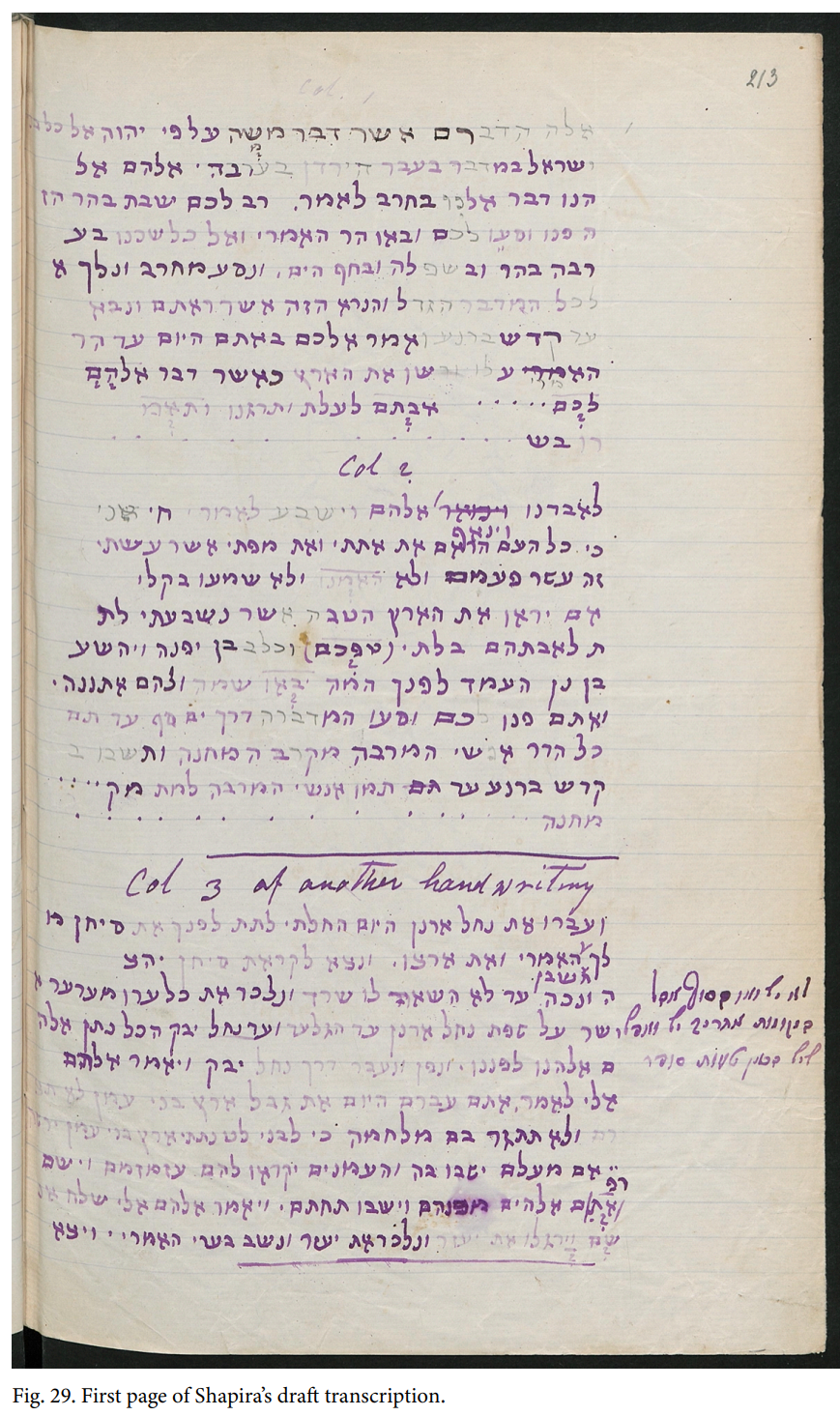
First page of Shapira's draft transcription

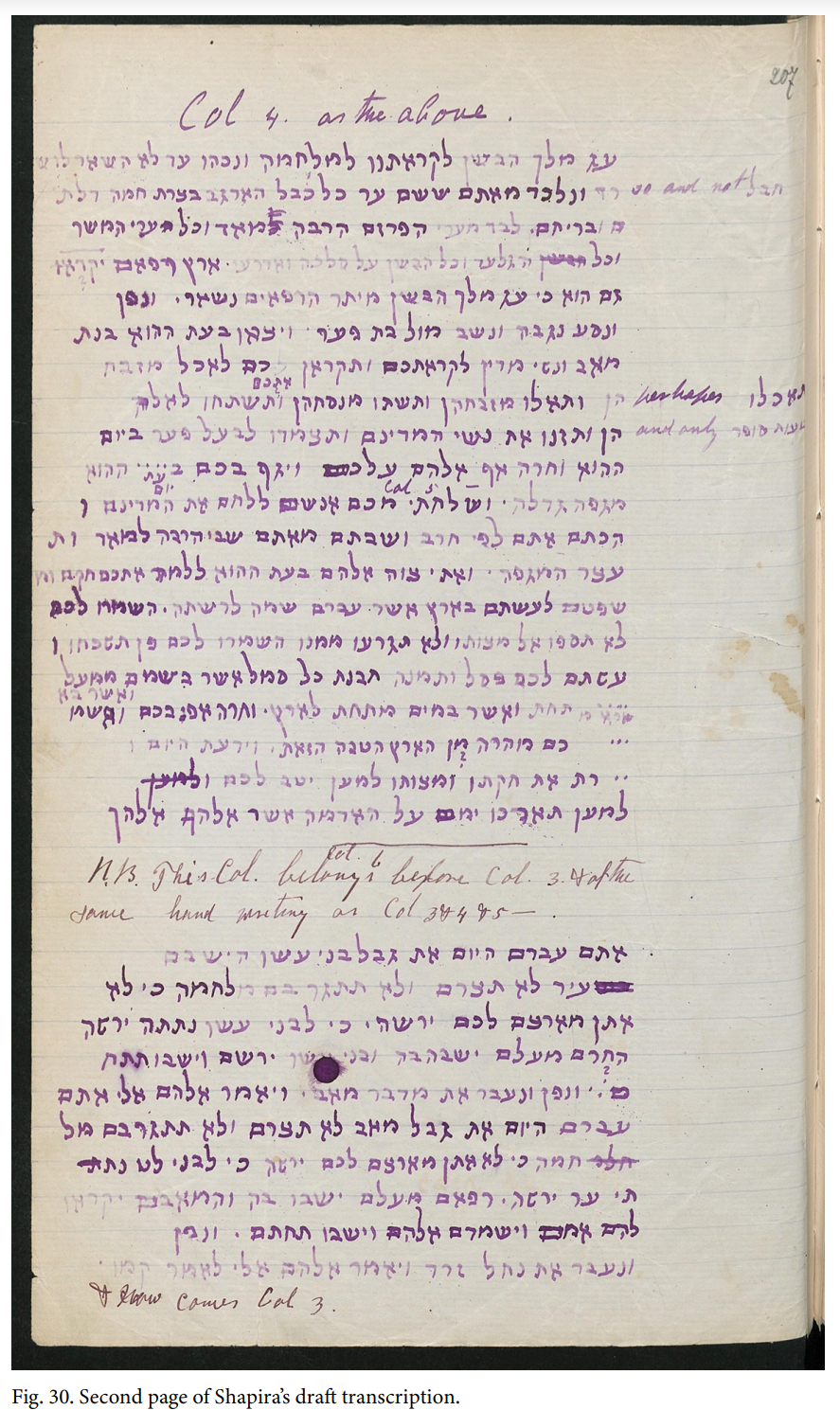
Second page of Shapira's draft transcription

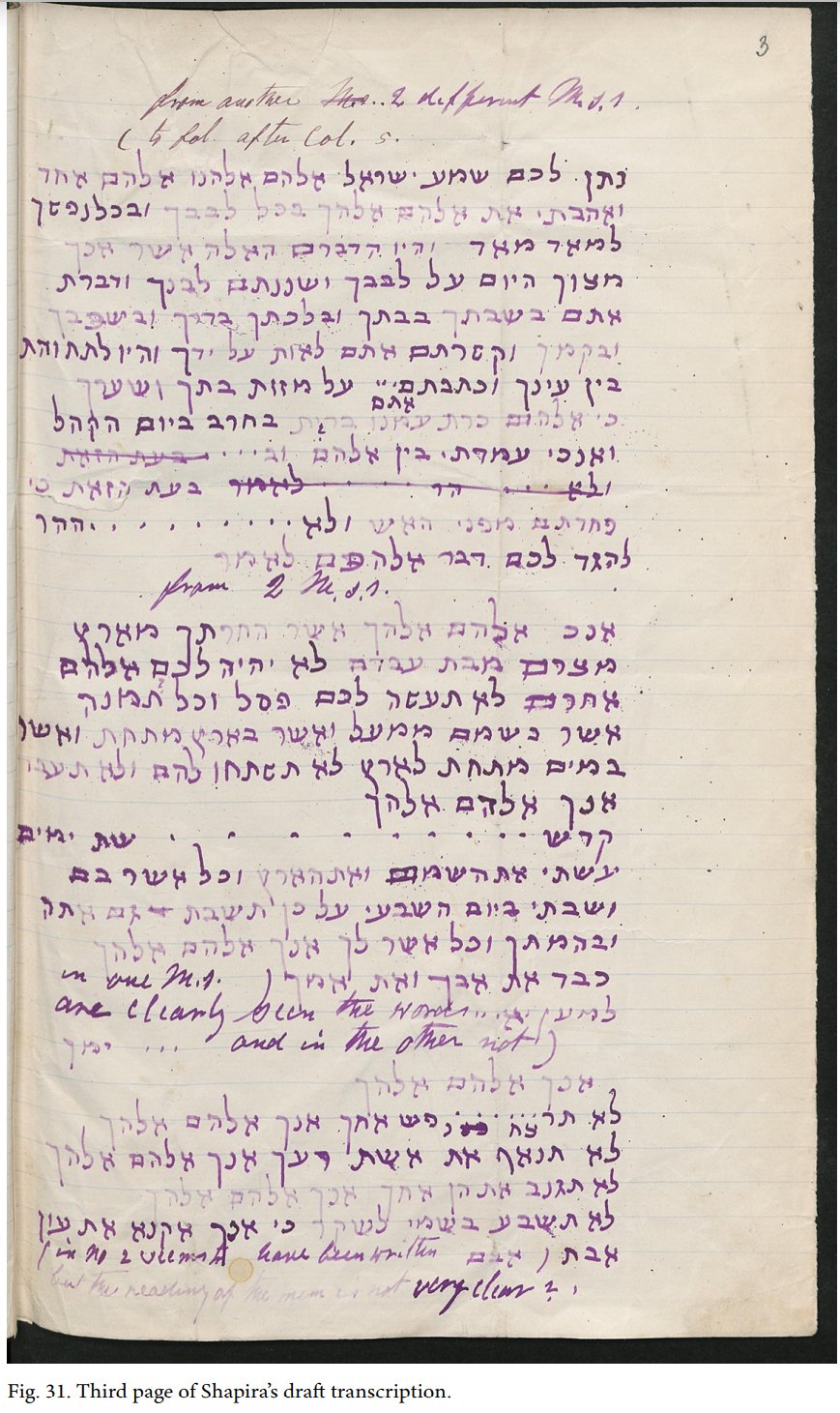
Third page of Shapira's draft transcription

== Bibliography ==
- Guil, Shlomo (2017). "The Shapira Scroll was an Authentic Dead Sea Scroll". Palestine Exploration Quarterly. 149 (1): 6–27. doi:10.1080/00310328.2016.1185895. S2CID 165114970.

== Primary sources ==
- British Library Add. MS. 41294, "Papers Relative to M. W. Shapira's Forged MS. of Deuteronomy (A.D. 1883–1884)."
- Some letters and images were published in Shavit, Yaakov (1984). "הערה לביוגראפיה של משה וילהלם שפירא, סוחר העתיקות מירושלים ולזיופיו" [Note to the biography of Moshe Wilhelm Shapira, the antiquities dealer from Jerusalem and his forgeries]. Cathedra (in Hebrew) (31): 182–188. ISSN 0334-4657. JSTOR 23398966.
