= Christian David Ginsburg =

Polish-born British Bible scholar

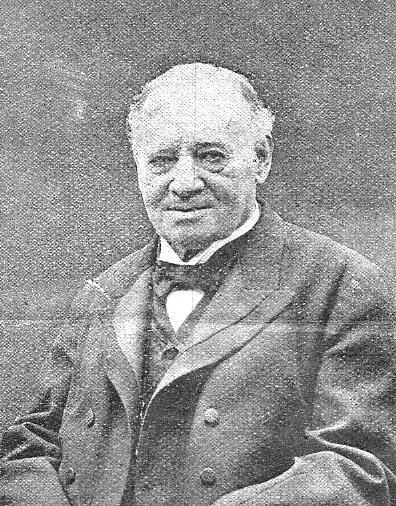
- Born: 25 December 1831; Warsaw, Poland
- Died: 7 March 1914 (aged 82); Palmers Green, Middlesex, England

Christian David Ginsburg (Hebrew: כריסטיאן דוד גינצבורג, 25 December 1831 – 7 March 1914) was a Polish-born British Bible scholar and a student of the Masoretic tradition in Judaism. He was born to a Jewish family in Warsaw but converted to Christianity at the age of 15.

Coming to England shortly after the completion of his education in the Rabbinic College at Warsaw, Ginsburg continued his study of the Hebrew Scriptures, with particular attention to the Megillot. The first result was a translation of the Song of Songs, with a historical and critical commentary, published in 1857. A similar interpretation of Ecclesiastes, followed by treatises on the Karaites, the Essenes, and the Kabbala, kept the author prominently before biblical students while he was preparing the first sections of his magnum opus, the critical study of the Masorah.

== Magnum opus ==
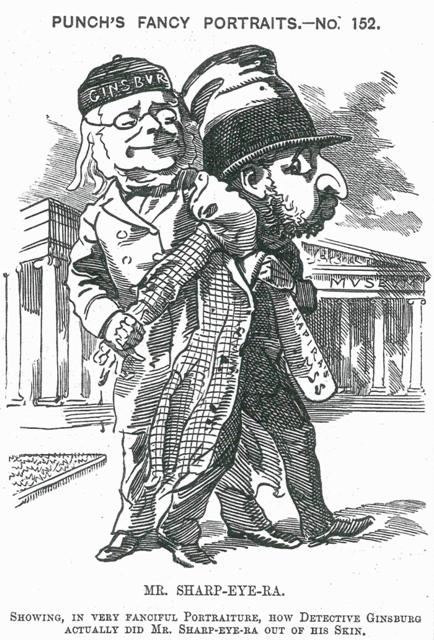
1883 Punch magazine cartoon of Ginsburg with Moses Shapira following the statement that the Shapira Scroll was a forgery.

Beginning in 1867 with the publication of Jacob ben Hayyim ibn Adonijah's Introduction to the Rabbinic Bible, Hebrew and English, with notices, and the Masoret haMasoret of Elias Levita, in Hebrew, with translation and commentary, Ginsburg took rank as an eminent Hebrew scholar. In 1870, he was appointed one of the first members of the committee for the revision of the English version of the Old Testament under contract with the Trinitarian Bible Society. His life-work culminated in the publication of the Masorah, in three volumes (1880–1886), followed by the Massoretico-critical edition of the Hebrew Bible (1894), and the elaborate introduction to it (1897).

== Other works ==
Ginsburg had one predecessor in the field; the learned Jacob ben Hayyim, who, in 1524–25, had published the second Rabbinic Bible (Mikraot Gedolot), containing what has ever since been known as the Masorah. Still, the materials were not available, and criticism was not sufficiently advanced for a complete edition. Ginsburg took up the subject almost where it was left off by this early pioneer, and he collected portions of the Masorah from the countless manuscripts scattered throughout Europe and the East.

Ginsburg published Facsimiles of Manuscripts of the Hebrew Bible (1897 and 1898), and The Text of the Hebrew Bible in Abbreviations (1903), in addition to a critical treatise on the relationship of the so-called Codex Babylonicus of A.D. 916 to the Eastern Recension of the Hebrew Text (1899, for private circulation). In the last-mentioned work, he seeks to prove that the St. Petersburg Codex, for so many years accepted as the original text of the Babylonian school, is, in reality, a Palestinian text that was carefully altered to render it conformable to the Babylonian recension. He subsequently undertook the preparation of a new edition of the Hebrew Bible for the British and Foreign Bible Society.

He also contributed many articles to John Kitto's Encyclopaedia, William Smith's "Dictionary of Christian Biography and the Encyclopædia Britannica (1877–87).

== Selected bibliography ==
- The Massorah; Compiled from Manuscripts; Band I, London/Vienna, Brög, 1880;
  Digital copy: Ginsburg, The Massorah Ia & Ginsburg, 1880: The Massorah Ib.
- The Massorah; Compiled from Manuscripts; Band II, London/Vienna, Brög, 1880;
  Digital copy: Ginsburg, 1880: The Massorah IIa & Ginsburg, The Massorah IIb.
- The Massorah; Compiled from Manuscripts; Band III, London/Vienna, Brög, 1880;
  Digital copy: Ginsburg, 1880: The Massorah III.
- The Massorah; Translated into English; With a critical and exegetical commentary; Band IV, London/Vienna, Brög, 1897–1905;
  Digital Copy: Ginsburg, 1905: The Massorah IV.
- Introduction to the Massoretico-critical edition of the Hebrew Bible, London, Trinitarian Bible Society, 1897;
  Digital Copy: Ginsburg Introduction.
- The Essenes: Their history & doctrines; Longman, Roberts, & Green, 1864.
- Jacob Ben Chajim Ibn Adonijah's Introduction to the Rabbinic Bible, London, 1867;
  Digital Copy: Ginsburg, 1867: Jacob Ben Chajim Ibn Adonijah's Introduction to the Rabbinic Bible.
- The Massoreth Ha-Massoreth of Elias Levita, being an exposition of the Massoretic notes on the Hebrew Bible, or the ancient critical apparatus of the Old Testament in Hebrew, with an English translation, & critical and explanatory notes, London, Longmans, 1867;
  Digital copy: Ginsburg, 1867: The Massoreth Ha-Massoreth of Elias Levita.
- Ḥamishah Ḥumshe Torah, London 1908.
- The Kabbalah: its doctrines, development, & literature; London, 1920.
