= Myriam Harry =

French journalist and writer

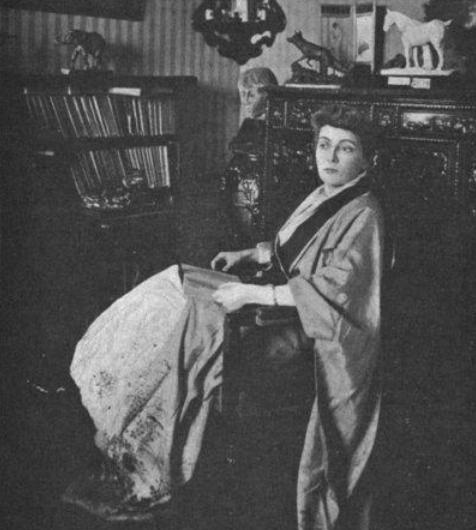
- Myriam Harry in 1904
- Born: Maria Rosette Shapira; April 1869 (sometimes stated to be born on 21 February 1875, but baptized 2 May 1869); Jerusalem, Ottoman Empire
- Died: 10 March 1958 (aged 88); Neuilly-sur-Seine, France
- Occupations: Writer; Journalist

Myriam Harry was the pen name of Maria Rosette Shapira (April 1869 – 10 March 1958), a French journalist and writer.

The daughter of Moses Wilhelm and Anna Magdalena Rosette Shapira (née Jöckel), she was born in Jerusalem. Her father, originally from Ukraine in Czarist Russia and a convert from Judaism to Christianity, committed suicide and the family moved to Berlin. She later moved to Paris. She became secretary to Jules Lemaître. Shapira worked for La Fronde and also wrote several journals in Paris. In 1902, she published her first novel, Petites Épouses. Her 1903 work La Conquête de Jérusalem received the first Prix Femina, which was created in 1904 especially for her, since she was excluded from consideration for the Prix Goncourt because she was a woman.

In 1904, Shapira married Emile Perrault.

She also wrote accounts of her travels in the Middle East, Africa and Asia. Her reportage of the trial of insurgents accused of murdering French settlers in the Thala-Kasserine Disturbances was instrumental in securing clemency for those sentenced to death.

She died in Neuilly-sur-Seine, France.

== Selected works ==
- La Divine chanson (1911)
- La petite fille de Jérusalem (1914)
- Siona chez les Barbares (1918)
- Siona à Paris (1919)
- Le Tendre cantique de Siona (1922)
- Les Amants de Sion (1923)
- La Nuit de Jérusalem (1928)
- La Jérusalem retrouvée (1930)
