= Edward Augustus Bond =

British librarian

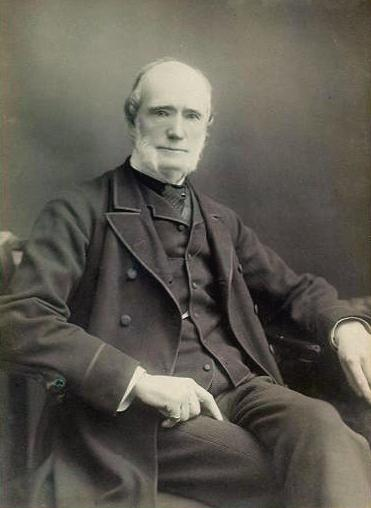
- Born: 31 December 1815; Hanwell, London, England
- Died: 2 January 1898 (aged 82); Paddington, London, England
- Known for: Principal librarian, British Museum

Sir Edward Augustus Bond KCB (31 December 1815 – 2 January 1898) was an English librarian.

== Biography ==
Bond was born at Hanwell, London, England, the son of a schoolmaster. He was educated at Merchant Taylors' School, Northwood, and in 1832 obtained a post in the Public Record Office. In 1838, he became an assistant in the manuscript department of the British Museum, where he attracted the notice of his chief, Sir Frederic Madden, a leading paleographer of his day, and in 1852 he was made Egerton librarian. In 1856, he became assistant keeper of manuscripts, and in 1867 was promoted to the post of keeper.

His work in reorganising the manuscript department was of lasting value, and to him is due the classified catalogue of manuscripts, and the improved efficiency and punctuality of publication of the department. In 1873, he was appointed principal librarian of the British Museum. Under his supervision, the new buildings of the White Wing were erected, to accommodate prints, drawings, manuscripts and newspapers. The purchase of the Stowe manuscripts was concluded while he was in office. He founded, in conjunction with Sir Edward Maunde Thompson, the Palaeographical Society, and made scientific improvements to classical palaeography.

He was made LL.D. of Cambridge in 1879, created CB in 1885, and KCB the day before his death in January 1898.

Bond published little, but he was the editor of four volumes of facsimiles of Anglo-Saxon charters from 679 to the Conquest, The Speeches in the Trial of Warren Hastings (1859–1861), and a number of other historic documents. These included Chronica Monasterii de Melsa... (3 vols, 1866–8), the 14th-century chronicles of Meaux Abbey.

He married Caroline Frances Barham (22 July 1823 – 1 August 1912), second daughter of the Reverend Richard Harris Dalton Barham.
