= Moses Wilhelm Shapira =

19th-century antiquities dealer

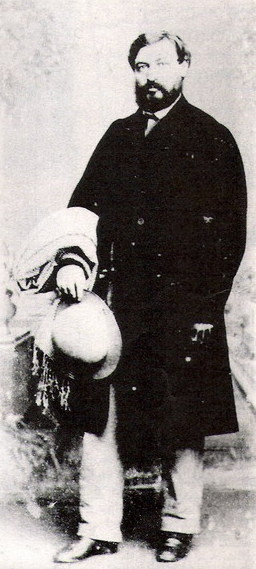
- Born: 1830; Kamenets-Podolski, Russian Empire (now Ukraine)
- Died: March 9, 1884 (aged 53–54); Hotel Willemsbrug in Rotterdam, Netherlands
- Citizenship: Russian; Prussian
- Occupation: Antiquities dealer
- Known for: His role in the possibly forged or authentic manuscripts of the biblical book of Deuteronomy known as Shapira Scroll
- Children: 2, including Myriam Harry

Moses Wilhelm Shapira (Hebrew: מוזס וילהלם שפירא; 1830 – March 9, 1884) was a Jerusalem antiquities dealer and purveyor of both authentic and forged Semitic antiquities, including some allegedly Biblical artifacts, the most high profile of which was the Shapira Scroll. The shame brought about by accusations that he was involved in the forging of that specific allegedly ancient biblical text and the difficult situation created by the scandal drove him to suicide in 1884.

== Early life and career ==
Moses Shapira was born in 1830 to Polish-Jewish parents in Kamenets-Podolski, which at the time was part of Russian-annexed Poland (in modern-day Ukraine). Shapira's father emigrated to Ottoman Palestine without Moses. Later, in 1856, at the age of 25, Moses Shapira followed his father to the Holy Land. His grandfather, who accompanied him, died en route.

On the way, while in Bucharest, Moses Shapira converted to Christianity and applied for Prussian citizenship, adding Wilhelm to his name. Once in Jerusalem, he joined the community of Protestant missionaries and converts who met at Christ Church, and in 1869 opened a store in the Street of the Christians, today's Christian Quarter Road. He sold the usual religious souvenirs enjoyed by pilgrims, as well as ancient pots he acquired from Arab farmers. While a patient in the German Lutheran congregation of Deaconess sisters, Shapira met a nurse, Deaconess Rosette Jöckel, who became his wife.

== Antiquities dealer and alleged forger ==
In addition to selling souvenirs to tourists, Shapira also sold a variety of antiquities, some legitimate, and some fake, becoming the pre-eminent antiquities dealer for European collectors.

Shapira attempted to sell a fake "coffin of Samson" in London, but it was exposed by Adolf Neubauer after he realized the epitaph had misspelled the name as "Sampson."

After the lucrative 1873 Moabitica deal in which he sold 1,700 fake figurines to a Berlin museum, Shapira was able to move outside the Old City walls of Jerusalem with his family into an elegant villa north of Jaffa Road, today known as Beit Ticho (Ticho House).

== Moabite forgeries ==
Shapira became interested in biblical artifacts after the appearance of the so-called Moabite Stone, also known as the Mesha Stele. He witnessed the huge interest around it and may have had a hand in negotiating on behalf of the German representatives. France eventually got the fragments of the original stone, leaving the British and the Germans rather frustrated.

The squeeze which helped reconstruct the shattered Mesha Stele was taken on behalf of the French scholar and diplomat Charles Clermont-Ganneau by a Christian Arab painter and dragoman (tour-guide), Salim al-Khouri, better known as Salim al-Kari, "the reader", a nickname apparently given to him by the Bedouin due to his work with ancient alphabets. Salim soon became Shapira's associate and provided connections to Arab craftsmen who, along with Salim himself, produced for Shapira's shop large amounts of fake Moabite artifacts – large stone-made human heads, but mainly clay objects: vessels, figurines and erotic pieces, generously covered with inscriptions based chiefly on the signs Salim had copied from the Mesha Stele. To modern scholars, the products seem clumsy – inscriptions do not translate to anything legible, for one – but at the time there was little with which to compare them. Shapira even organized an expedition to Moab for potential buyers, to sites where he had Salim's Bedouin associates bury more forgeries. Some scholars began to base theories on these pieces, and the term Moabitica was coined for this entirely new category of "Moabite" artifacts.

Since German archaeologists had not gained possession of the Moabite Stone, they rushed to buy the Shapira Collection ahead of their rivals. Berlin's Altes Museum bought 1700 artifacts for the cost of 22,000 thalers in 1873. Other private collectors followed suit. One of them was Horatio Kitchener, a not yet famous British lieutenant, who bought eight pieces for the Palestine Exploration Fund. Shapira was able to move to the luxurious Aga Rashid property (modern-day Ticho House), outside Jerusalem's squalid Old City, with his wife and two daughters.

Still various people, including Charles Clermont-Ganneau, had their doubts. Clermont-Ganneau suspected Salim al-Kari, questioned him and in time found the man who supplied him with clay, a stonemason who worked for him, and other accomplices. He published his findings in the Athenaeum newspaper in London and declared all "Moabitica" to be forgeries, a conclusion with which even the German scholars eventually concurred (cf. Emil Friedrich Kautzsch and Albert Socin, Die Echtheit der moabitischen Altertümer geprüft, 1876). Shapira defended his collection vigorously until his rivals presented more evidence against them. He placed the entire blame on Salim al-Kari, convinced almost everyone that he was just an innocent victim, and continued to do a considerable trade especially in genuine old Hebrew manuscripts from Yemen.

== Manuscript affair ==
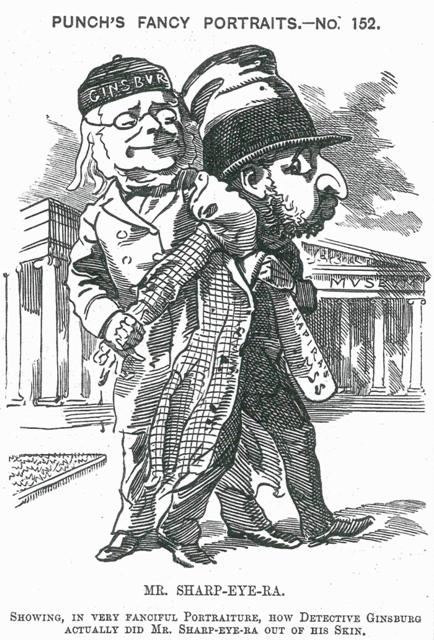
1883 Punch cartoon of Shapira and Ginsburg

In 1870, Shapira sold five scrolls written on leather to Edward Yorke McCauley; these were discovered in 1884 to have been artificially aged.

In 1883, Shapira presented what is now known as the Shapira Strips, a supposedly ancient scroll written on leather strips which he claimed had been found near the Dead Sea. The Hebrew text hinted at a different version of Deuteronomy, including a surprising alternate commandment ("Thou shalt not hate thy brother in thy heart: I am God, thy God"). Shapira sought to sell them to the British Museum for a million pounds, and allowed them to exhibit two of the 15 strips. The exhibition was attended by thousands.

However, Clermont-Ganneau also attended the exhibition; Shapira had denied him access to the other 13 strips. After close examination, Clermont-Ganneau declared them to be forgeries. Soon afterward British biblical scholar Christian David Ginsburg came to the same conclusion. Later Clermont-Ganneau showed that the leather of the Deuteronomy scroll was quite possibly cut from the margin of a genuine Yemenite scroll that Shapira had previously sold to the Museum, a claim widely accepted in 1883 and since then. It was not until 2022 that Clermont-Ganneau's claim was tested by an examination of the Torah scrolls Shapira had sold, an examination that found the margins to be of insufficient height to supply the leather.

Following the rejection of the scroll by a large range of scholars, Punch ridiculed Shapira with a cartoon using anti-Semitic stereotypes.

Shapira fled London in despair, his name ruined and all of his hopes crushed. Having spent some time in a hotel in Bloemendaal (Netherlands), in hotel Adler in Rotterdam, he shot himself in Hotel Willemsbrug in Rotterdam on March 9, 1884. He was buried in the poor men's part of the Crooswijk cemetery.

The Shapira Strips disappeared and then reappeared a couple of years later in a Sotheby's auction, where they were sold for 10 guineas. Although it is now known that the strips were not destroyed by fire in 1899 as had previously been suggested, the fact that their current whereabouts is unknown leaves room for speculation.

In light of the discovery of the Dead Sea Scrolls in 1947, some scholars have called for a re-examination of the forgery charges.

== Heritage ==
Shapira "Moabitica" fakes still exist in museums and private collections around the world but are rarely displayed. By now they have become desirable collectibles in their own right.

The exact location of Shapira's shop on Christian Quarter Road in Jerusalem has now been identified.

== Personal life ==
Shapira was married to Rosette Jöckel and had two daughters with her; Maria Rosette Shapira (pen name: Myriam Harry) and Augusta Louisa Wilhelmina Shapira.

== In literature ==
Shapira's life is the subject of the novel Ke-heres Ha-nishbar (As a Broken Vessel - Keter, Jerusalem, 1984) by Shulamit Lapid, translated into German as Er begab sich in die Hand des Herrn.
