= Winiary =

Winiary may refer to the following:

== Settlements ==
=== Neighbourhoods ===
- Winiary, Poznań, former villages around the Winogrady neighbourhood, currently a neighbourhood in the Jeżyce district of Poznań
- Winiary, Gniezno, a neighbourhood in Gniezno
- Winiary, Płock, a neighbourhood in Płock
- Winiary, Kalisz, a neighbourhood in Kalisz
- Winiary, Głogówek, a neighbourhood in Głogówek
- Winiary, Warka, a suburb of Warka in Masovian Voivodeship

=== Town's and villages ===
- Winiary, Proszowice County in Lesser Poland Voivodeship (south Poland)
- Winiary, Gmina Gniezno in Greater Poland Voivodeship (west-central Poland)
- Winiary, Wieliczka County in Lesser Poland Voivodeship (south Poland)
- Winiary, Pińczów County in Świętokrzyskie Voivodeship (south-central Poland)
- Winiary, Sandomierz County in Świętokrzyskie Voivodeship (south-central Poland)

== Buildings ==
- Fort Winiary, a former fort around Poznań

== Business ==
- Winiary (company), a Polish food processing company

== Sports ==
- Winiary Kalisz, former name of a professional women's volleyball team
