= Stanisław Szymański =

Stanisław Szymański may refer to:

- Stanisław Szymański (industrialist) (1862–1944)
- Stanisław Szymański (dancer) (1930–1999)
