= Winiary (company) =

Polish food producer

Winiary Nestlé Polska S.A. Oddział w Kaliszu
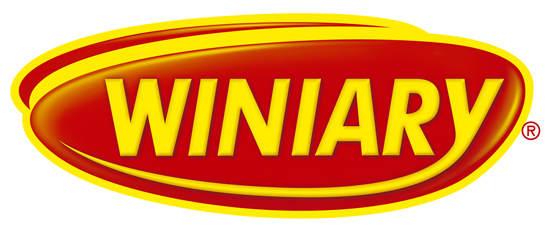
- Trade name: Winiary
- Type: Subsidiary
- Industry: Food industry
- Founded: 1941; 85 years ago
- Founder: Alfred Nowacki
- Headquarters: Kalisz, Poland
- Area served: Poland
- Key people: Arek Żyłka (Director)
- Products: Soups; Mayonnaise; Desserts; Seasoning
- Number of employees: 1,000 (2015)
- Parent: Nestlé
- Website: winiary.pl

Winiary Nestlé Polska S.A. Oddział w Kaliszu, known more commonly as Winiary, is a Polish food processing company based in the Kalisz borough of Winiary.

Currently, the company is part of Nestlé, specialising in convenience food as well as quick to prepare food (mostly pulverised), instant ready-cooked meals, sauces, soups (mostly instant noodles), jelly, kissel and blancmange. Winiary also produces sets of seasoning, which are pulverised and in liquid form (from concentrate).

== History ==
=== Early history ===
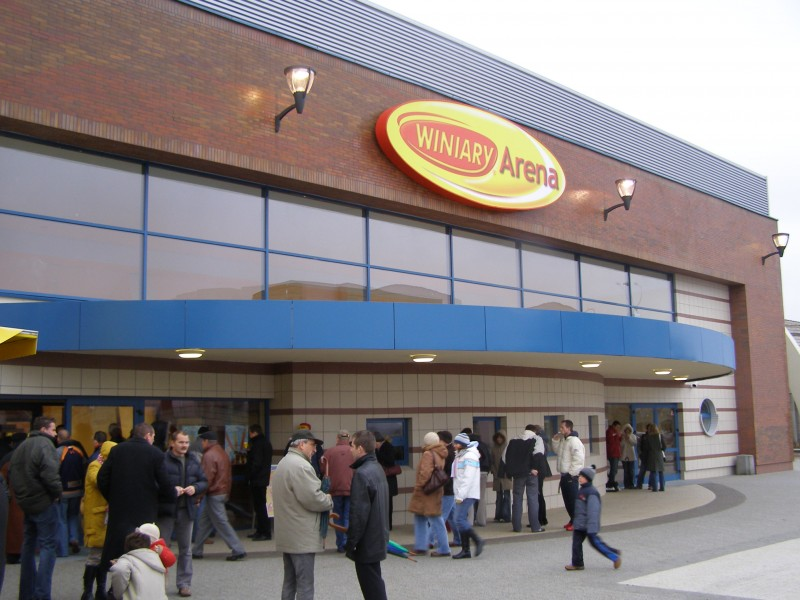
Winiary Arena (Kalisz)

The company was founded in 1941 by Alfred Nowacki, a Polish spy returning from Germany, and a member of the Polish resistance movement in World War II.

The factory was a focal point of the Kalisz unit of the Home Army. Nowacki fictitiously employed his Polish underground associates at the factory. In March 1944 he was arrested by the Gestapo, then subjected to brutal investigation in Łódź, and eventually sentenced to death and executed in nearby Skarszew in 1945.

During 2002–2003, Winiary received various awards for its Majonez Dekoracyjny (Decoration Mayonnaise) product.

In 1998, the image of the company was affected by sanitary epidemiological reconnaissance, which discovered the bacteria salmonella in Winiary's pulverised soups. The company later admitted that the cause of the salmonella bacteria was from imported dried onions. Although the products did not cause any health concerns (the pulverised soups require boiling, in which the bacteria die during the heat treating), confirmed by the sanitary epidemiological reconnaissance, the situation caused negative public opinions and publicity in the media.

== Products ==
Winiary specialises in convenience food. Their portfolio includes:

=== Soups ===
Instant ready-cooked soups, including instant noodles.

=== Sauces ===
A range of sauces for various dishes.

=== Mayonnaises ===
Notably, their Majonez Dekoracyjny (Decoration Mayonnaise) has received awards.

=== Desserts ===
Including puddings, jellies, and blancmange.

=== Seasonings ===
Sets of pulverised and liquid seasonings.

=== Instant meals ===
Quick-to-prepare meals for busy households.

== See also ==
- List of companies of Poland
- List of Nestlé brands
