= Urszula Zybura =

Polish poet

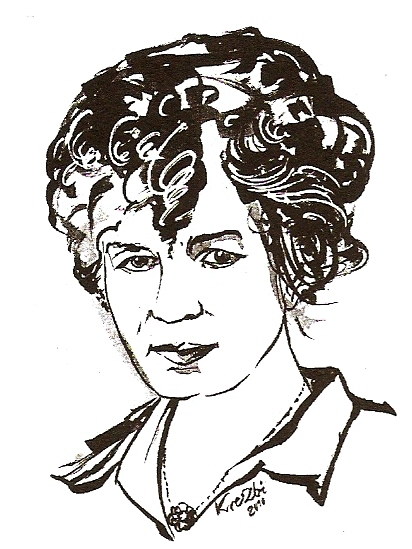
- Urszula Zybura
- Born: 22 June 1952 (age 74); Kalisz, Poland
- Writing career
- Notable works: Terminally alive I love you, I'm lost

Urszula Irena Zybura (born 22 June 1952 in Kalisz) is a Polish poet, President of the Board of the Wielkopolska Branch of the Polish Writers' Union, publisher, and Esperantist.

== Biography ==
She graduated from the Faculty of Pedagogy and Fine arts in Kalisz University.

She made her New Year's Eve edition of biweekly Wroclaw University of Technology "Sigma" (1975/1976) as author of ''aphorisms''. She published six collections of aphorisms and a common collection of single aphorisms with the doctor, Henryk Słodkowski. She also published aphorisms in the Polish-German version "Verwirrte Aphorismen". She published two volumes of poetry at the Literary Publishing House in Cracow: "Untouchably Living" and "For ages and years" (both reviewed by Wisława Szymborska).

In 1995, her poem "Życie" sang "Agnieszka Hekiert" Take 5 and has been a laureate of one of the three major awards at the Student Poetry Song Festival.

Zybura translates Polish poetry and aphorisms into Esperanto; In 1992, a collection of her own aphorisms and poems and translated poetry by Cz. Zybury's poems and aphorisms have been translated, among others to German, English, Italian, Esperanto, Greek and Romanian. She wrote a book on the subject: "Academy of Happiness".

She has published 20 books.

== Publications ==
=== Aphorisms ===
- "Aphorisms", Kalisz: Voivodeship Culture Center, 1984.
- "Close ups or paradoxes", Warsaw: Reprint, 1991.
- "Alproksimigoj malproksimigas", Kalisz, Town Hall, 1992
- "444 new aphorisms", Kalisz: Wydawnictwo "KROPKA", 1997.
- "Zyburki and other aphorisms", Kalisz: Wydawnictwo "KROPKA", 1998.
- "Verwirrte Aphorismen", Kalisz: Kropka, 2003.
- "Zyburaki – aphorisms almost speechless", Cracow: Miniature, 2006.
- "Hifiograms", Cracow: Miniature, 2008 (together with Henryk Słodkowski).
- "Thought Twisted," Krakow: Miniature, 2011.

=== Poems ===
- "Human Dogs", Ostrów Wlkp., MPiK, 1983
- "Incurably alive", 1986.
- "For ages and years", 1994
- "Love is more than the most", Kalisz: Kropka, 1997.
- "Haiku", Kalisz: Kropka, 1997.
- "Haiku", Kalisz: Kropka, 1998.
- "I love you already," Kalisz: Kropka, 2002.
- "Haiku Anything", Cracow: Miniature, 2009.
- "212 poems", Cracow: Miniature, 2012.

== Other ==
- Words that heal. Affirmations and aphorisms, Kalisz: Kropka, 2002.
