= Winiary, Kalisz =

District of the city of Kalisz, Poland

Winiary
- District of Kalisz
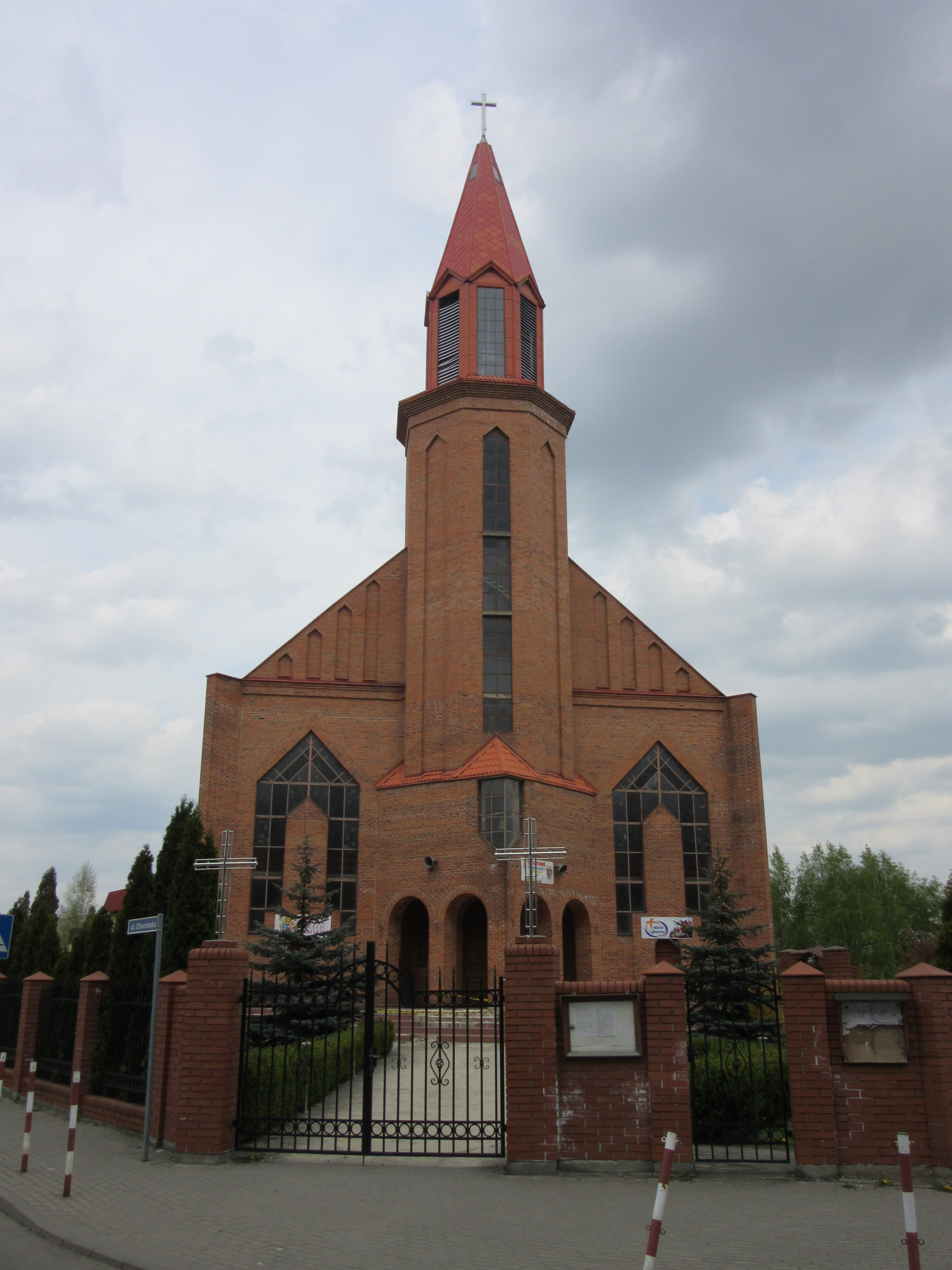
- Blessed Michał Kozal church

- Location within Poland
- Coordinates: 51°45′N 18°08′E
- Country: Poland
- Voivodeship: Greater Poland
- County/City: Kalisz
- Time zone: UTC+1 (CET)
  - Summer (DST): UTC+2 (CEST)
- Vehicle registration: PK, PA

Winiary [viˈɲarɨ] is a district of Kalisz, Poland, located in the eastern part of the city.

The Winiary food company is based in the district.

== History ==
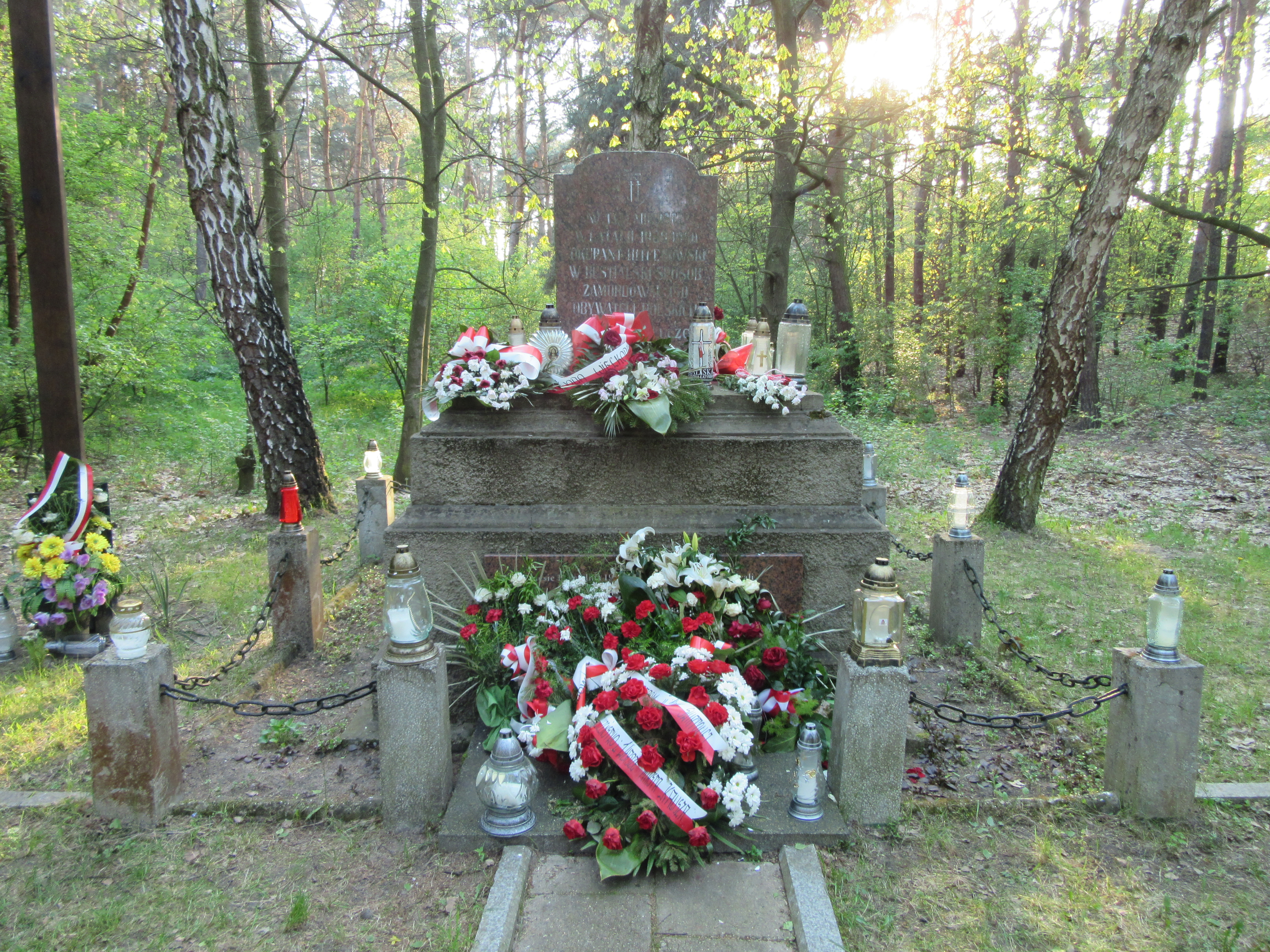
Memorial at the site of a massacre of 150 Poles

The oldest known mention of Winiary dates back to 1294. Within the Kingdom of Poland, it was administratively located in the Kalisz County in the Kalisz Voivodeship in the Greater Poland Province.

An ancient pagan cemetery was discovered in Winiary in 1890.

According to the 1921 census, the village with the adjacent manor farm had a population of 606, entirely Polish by nationality, 99.3% Roman Catholic and 0.7% Lutheran by confession.

During the German occupation of Poland (World War II), in 1939–1940, Winiary was the site of German massacres of several hundreds of Poles (see Nazi crimes against the Polish nation). Among the victims were defenders of Kalisz, people from Winiary, Kalisz, Ostrów Wielkopolski, Ostrzeszów and other nearby settlements arrested during the genocidal Intelligenzaktion campaign, former insurgents of the Greater Poland uprising, merchants, entrepreneurs, teachers, school principals, doctors, railwaymen, lawyers, farmers and mayors of Ostrów Wielkopolski and Odolanów. In 1940, the occupiers also carried out expulsions of Poles, whose houses and farms were then handed over to German colonists as part of the Lebensraum policy. In 1940, Polish spy and resistance member Alfred Nowacki, officially classified as a German, settled in Winiary, and soon founded a food processing company. The factory became a focal point of the Kalisz unit of the Home Army, and Nowacki fictitiously employed his Polish underground associates there. In March 1944 he was arrested by the Gestapo, then subjected to brutal investigation in Łódź, and eventually sentenced to death and executed in nearby Skarszew in 1945.

== Transport ==
The Kalisz Winiary railway station is located in the district.
