= Calisia =

Station on the Amber Road in Roman times

Calisia (Greek: Καλισία, Latin: Calisia) was a "station" on the so-called "Amber Road", mentioned by Ptolemy, formerly universally identified with Kalisz in Poland. Besides the similarity of the names, the identification was supported by the closeness between the latitude given by Ptolemy (52° 50') and the actual latitude of Kalisz (51° 45' 27").

The validity of these arguments is currently in doubt, mainly due to the identification of Ptolemy's Leukaristos, located at a latitude similar to that of Kalisz, with the name Laugaritio/Leugaritio certainly referring to the town of Trenčín in Slovakia (this identification is confirmed by a rock inscription made in the winter of 179/180 CE by a Roman military unit, and the biography of the unit's commander, M. Valesius Maximianus, carved on his tomb in Diana Veteranorum in today's Algeria). As Trenčín is much further south than the latitude given by Ptolemy, this identification seems to imply that Ptolemy's data on latitude of places north of the Danube had significant errors, hence making the Calisia-Kalisz identification doubtful.
