= Stanisław Szymański (dancer) =

Polish ballet dancer

- Born: 17 June 1930; Cracow
- Died: 10 February 1999 (aged 68); Warsaw
- Education: Janina Jarzynówna-Sobczak School of Artistic Dance in Cracow
- Employer: Grand Theatre, Warsaw
- Title: Premier danseur 1967–1985
- Honours: Officer's Cross of Order of Polonia Restituta, Golden Cross of Merit

Stanisław Szymański (17 June 1930 in Kraków – 10 February 1999 in Warsaw) was a Polish ballet dancer. In the years 1967–1985, he was the premier danseur of the Grand Theatre, Warsaw.

== Life ==
Szymański was a student of the Janina Jarzynówna-Sobczak School of Artistic Dance in Cracow, where he also studied under Leon Woizikovsky. It was Woizikovsky who finally brought him to Warsaw, where in 1948–1950 he performed in the musical ensemble of Teatr Nowy. In the 1950/51 season he was a ballet soloist at the Poznań Opera, where he also worked under the direction of Leon Woizikovsky. After being drafted into the army in 1951, he performed in the Song and Dance Ensemble of the House of the Polish Army in Warsaw. From 1956 he was a soloist of the ballet of the State Opera in Warsaw, and from 1965 of the ballet of the Grand Theater in Warsaw, where in the years 1967–1985 he held the title of principal dancer.

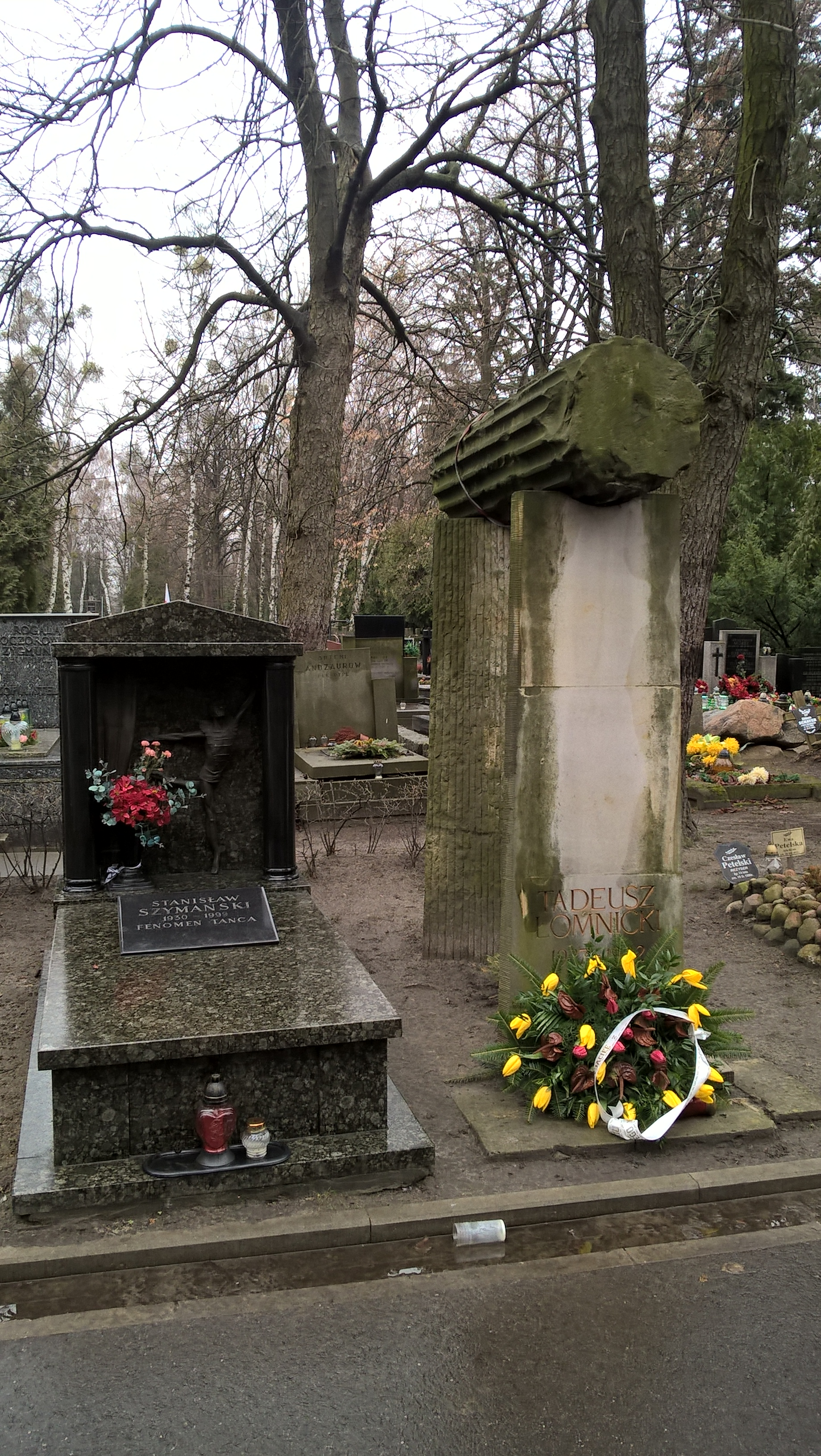
Grave of Szymański (left) on Powązki cemetery

In 1963, during the Warsaw Autumn festival, he received the SPAM "Orpheus" music critics award for his performance of the part of Orpheus in Igor Stravinsky's ballet. As the only Pole, he was honored in Paris with the Prix Nijinski. He has partnered with, among others Barbara Bittnerówna, Olga Sawicka, Maria Krzyszkowska, Barbara Olkusznik and Helena Strzelbicka. However, he became famous above all in demi-classical solo dances, in which he demonstrated technical freedom, dizzying pirouettes, height and lightness of the jump. The audience almost always enthusiastically greeted his every appearance on stage. Many of his performances (especially in Witold Gruca's contemporary ballets) have been captured on film. He performed for the last time in 1994 at the Studio Theater in Jerzy Grzegorzewski's Four Parallel Comedies. As one of the few artists of his time, he did not hide his homosexuality and became an icon of the LGBT community. He was buried along "Avenue of the Distinguished" on Powązki cemetery.

== Awards and honors ==
- 1954: Golden Cross of Merit
- 1959: Prix Nijinski in Paris
- 1963: Musical Critics award „Orpheus” for playing Orpheus in Stravinsky's ballet
- 1967: 2nd rank Award of Ministry of Culture and Arts
- 1971: Officer's Cross of Order of Polonia Restituta
- 1974: Polish State Award Badge, 2nd rank

== Bibliography ==
- Małgorzata Komorowska, Paweł Chynowski, Sztuka naturalna Stanisława Szymańskiego. Szkic do portretu, „Taniec”, Polski Teatr Tańca, Poznań 1980, s. 23–29.
- Irena Turska, Almanach baletu polskiego, 1945–1974, Polskie Wydawnictwo Muzyczne, Kraków 1983, s. 180, ISBN 83-224-0220-1
- Barbara Krzemień-Kołpanowicz, Szymański Stanisław, Encyklopedia muzyczna PWM, t. 10, Polskie Wydawnictwo Muzyczne, Kraków 1997, s. 301, ISBN 978-83-224-0866-7 t. 10
- Irena Turska, Przewodnik baletowy, Polskie Wydawnictwo Muzyczne, Warszawa 2008, ISBN 978-83-224-0470-6
- Tacjanna Wysocka, Dzieje baletu, Państwowy Instytut Wydawniczy, Warszawa 1970
- Małgorzata Komorowska (2015). Ludzie teatru na scenie i na zapleczu. Warszawa: Teatr Wielki – Opera Narodowa. pp. 141–144. ISBN 978-83-65161-37-6. OCLC 956578587.
- http://www.filmpolski.pl/fp/index.php?osoba=1146645
- Stanisław Szymański, Encyklopedia teatru polskiego. [online].
- Berger, Barbara (2015). "Szymański Stanisław". Polski Słownik Biograficzny. Vol. 50. Warszawa – Kraków: Polska Akademia Nauk – Polska Akademia Umiejętności. pp. 203–205. ISBN 9788363352370.
- Tomasik, Krzysztof (2012). Gejerel. Mniejszości seksualne w PRL-u. Warszawa: Wydawnictwo Krytyki Politycznej. ISBN 978-83-62467-54-9.
