= Stanisław Szymański (industrialist) =

Stanislaw Szymanski
- Born: 1862; Kalisz, Congress Poland
- Died: 23 April 1944 (aged 81–82); Warszawa

Stanisław Szymański (1862 – 23 April 1944) – general manager of Towarzystwo Akcyjne Zawiercie factory. Industrialist, an activist in the field of education, culture and voluntary causes and philanthropist.

== Life History ==
Not much information about the personal life of Stanislaw Szymanski is available. From existing sources, it can be learnt that he was born in Kalisz in the year 1862. As a young man, he went to college in Germany, but he finished his studies in tsarist Russia at Saint Petersburg State Institute of Technology with an engineering degree. After graduation, he moved to Warsaw. Further information about his stay and activities in the capital city was not found. Next notes about him appeared after his appearance in Zawiercie where he arrived with his wife presumably before 1895 (the exact date is not known). In the same year, he began building his villa (to this day called The Szymanski's Palace) on the then Franciszek Szymanski street. The name of the architect who designed the villa was Hugo Kudera.

Only few years after his arrival at Zawiercie, in 1901, Szymański was elected to a post of a chairman of Rada Nadzorcza Towarzystwa Pożyczkowo-Oszczędnościowego in Zawiercie. And in 1907, he was appointed the general manager of Towarzystwo Akcyjne „Zawiercie” factory and he held that position even after his departure from Zawiercie in 1931. In the same year, in December 1907, he became headmaster and chairman of the teaching staff in a newly built school for children of TAZ factory workers. He was also appointed president of Koło Opiekuńcze Rodziców in a private male gymnasium(1916), president of Żeńskie Seminarium Nauczycielskie (1916), and also president of the local body of Dozór Szkolny in Zawiercie (1919–1931)

In June 1910, he stood at the head of the very first Polish Touring Companionship department in Zawiercie, which he helped to establish. Whereas in 1927, he became chairman of an organization which took care of the castle ruins Ogrodzieniec and of other monuments in the region.

After granting a city charter to Zawiercie in 1915, Szymanski began his political activity on a local level. In the same year, in April, he was elected to be chairman of the city council, a function which he held for two terms. He was also a member of the city board. He belonged to the Christian-Democratic Party of which he was a leading activist in the region and had major influence in the board of the party in Warsaw.

As Świat magazine stated, Szymanski left Zawiercie in 1931 and went to Warsaw. Again, records about his later activities after his departure are unknown. The last information mentioned his death on 23 April 1944. Stanislaw Szymanski was buried on Powązki Cemetery.

== Szymański’s achievements ==
In Zawiercie, a figure of Stanisław Szymański is dwelled upon because of his great contribution in the development of the city in the first half of the 20th century. The list of his services is significant. As the manager of TAZ, he used his position and money for developmental purposes. As the part of TAZ factory activities, a housing estate for the workers was built. Szymański extended it by building new living quarters and also public facilities which concentrated the cultural activities of workers.

Szymański also brought forward a project of a school for children of TAZ factory workers. In order to fulfill that plan, all workers were taxed. The building was designed by Hugo Kudera. Construction began in 1906 and lasted over a year. An opening ceremony took place on 12 December 1907. This date is particularly mentioned in various sources because of the patriotic speech made by Szymański that day. As part of his educational and cultural activities, he also contributed by assembling the qualified teaching stuff and forming children's choral and musical group in TAZ school.

Szymanski was also famous for his charitable work which he did during the crisis which struck the city before, and after the First World War. In 1910, he co-founded a Christian charity. That organization subsidized the orphanage for poor children and provided support for unemployed families. When the World War I broke out, a majority of industrial plants in the city were closed off. It caused a massive unemployment and hunger. Since 18 September 1914, the social canteen was held which served free dinners; it was founded by TAZ and charity organization. Szymański had a seat on the canteen board.

== Sources ==
- Jerzy Abramski, Encyklopedia Zawiercia, Cieszyńska Drukarnia Wydawnicza, Zawiercie 2002.
- Monografia Zawiercia, red. Zdzisław Jagodziński, Zawiercie: Towarzystwo Miłośników Ziemi Zawierciańskiej, TESTDRUK, 2003.
- "Świat" nr 43, 24.10.1931 r. (dostępne także na: dawne-zawiercie.pl).
- Damian Domżalski, Stanisław Szymański, "Zawiercianin" nr 1 (dostępne także na: dawne-zawiercie.pl).
- Grzegorz Florczyk, Dzieje szkoły i historia budynku Gimnazjum nr 2 w Zawierciu. 1907-2004, Zawiercie: PUHW "Axon" s.c., 2004.
