= Kalisz =

City in Poland

- City county
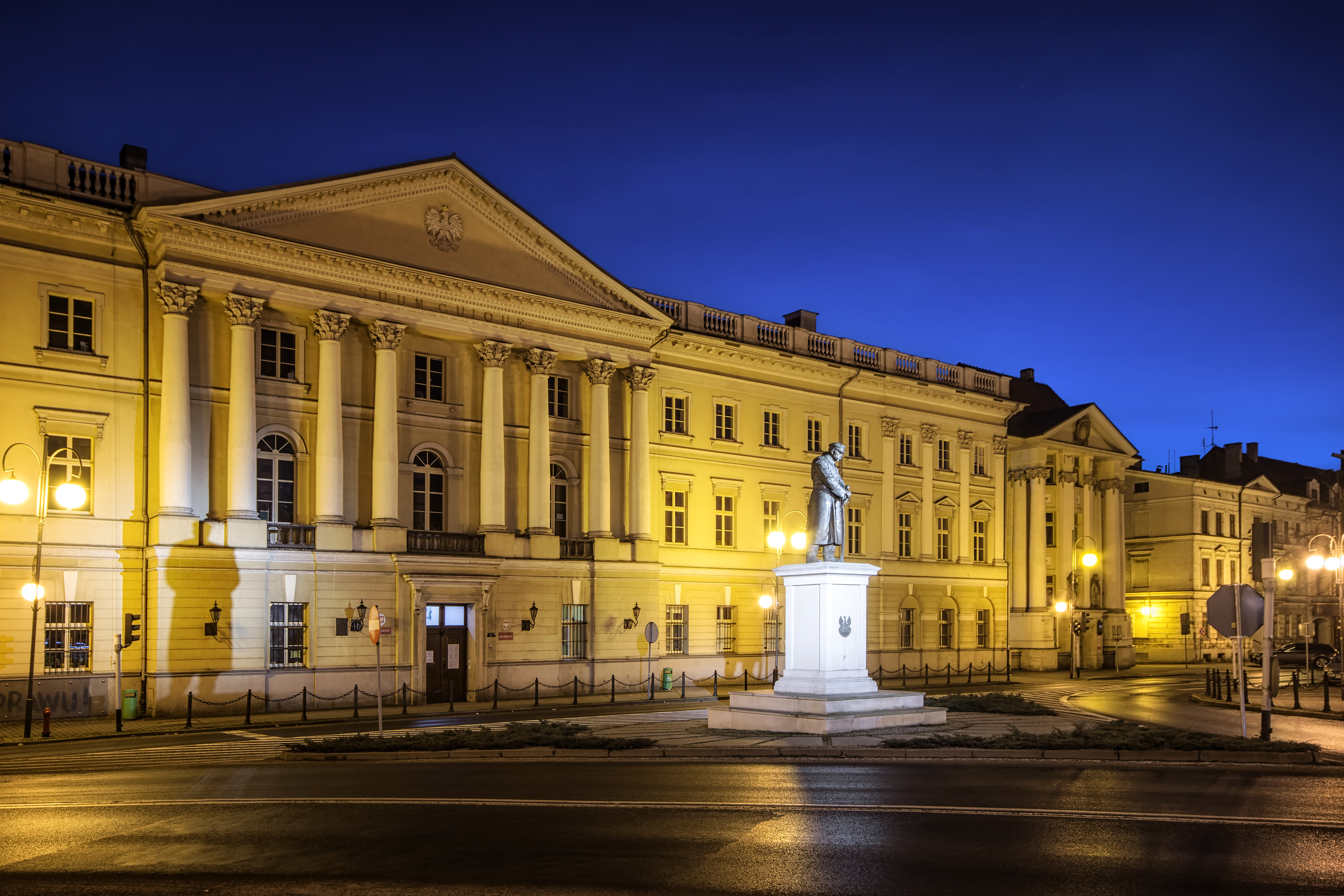
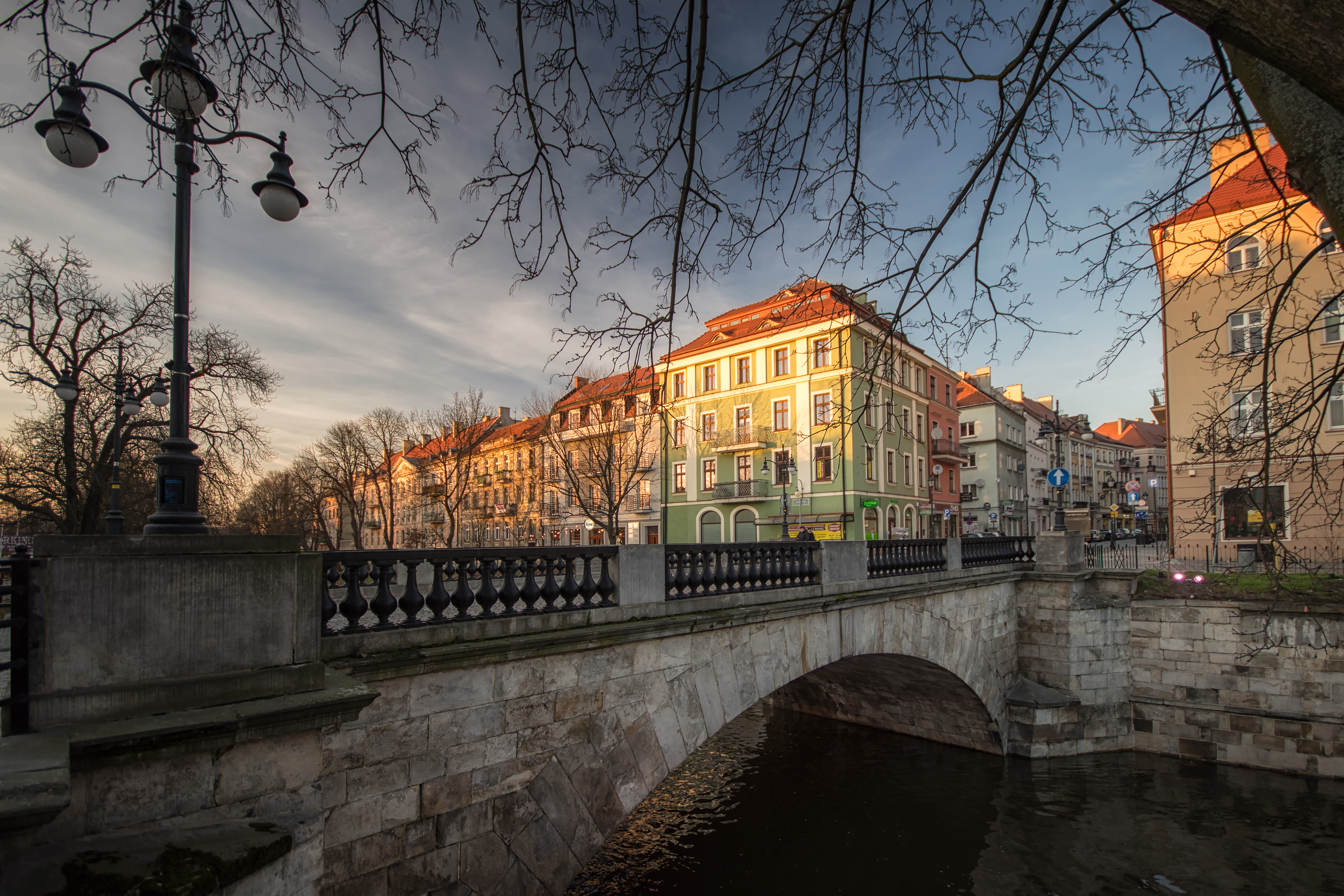
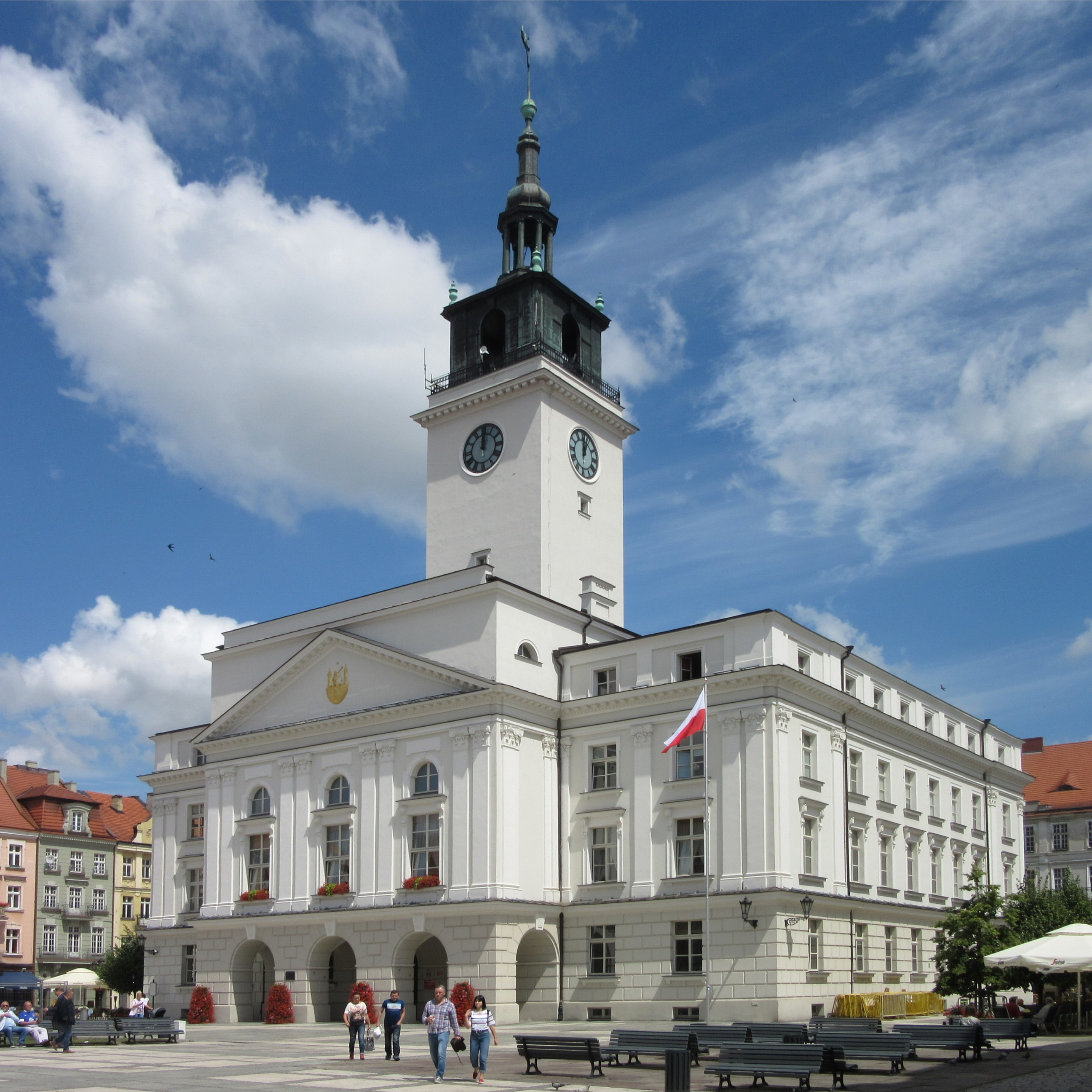
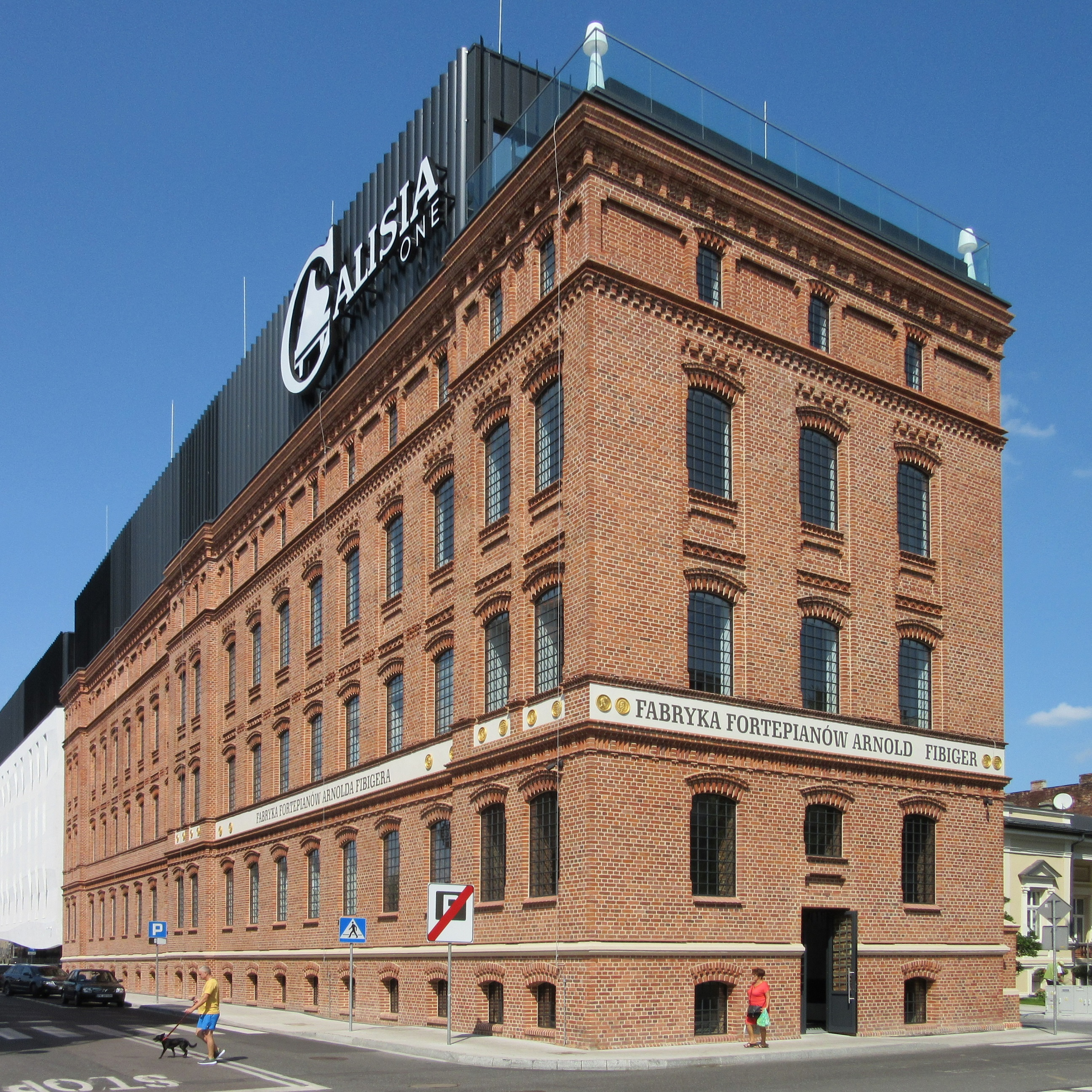
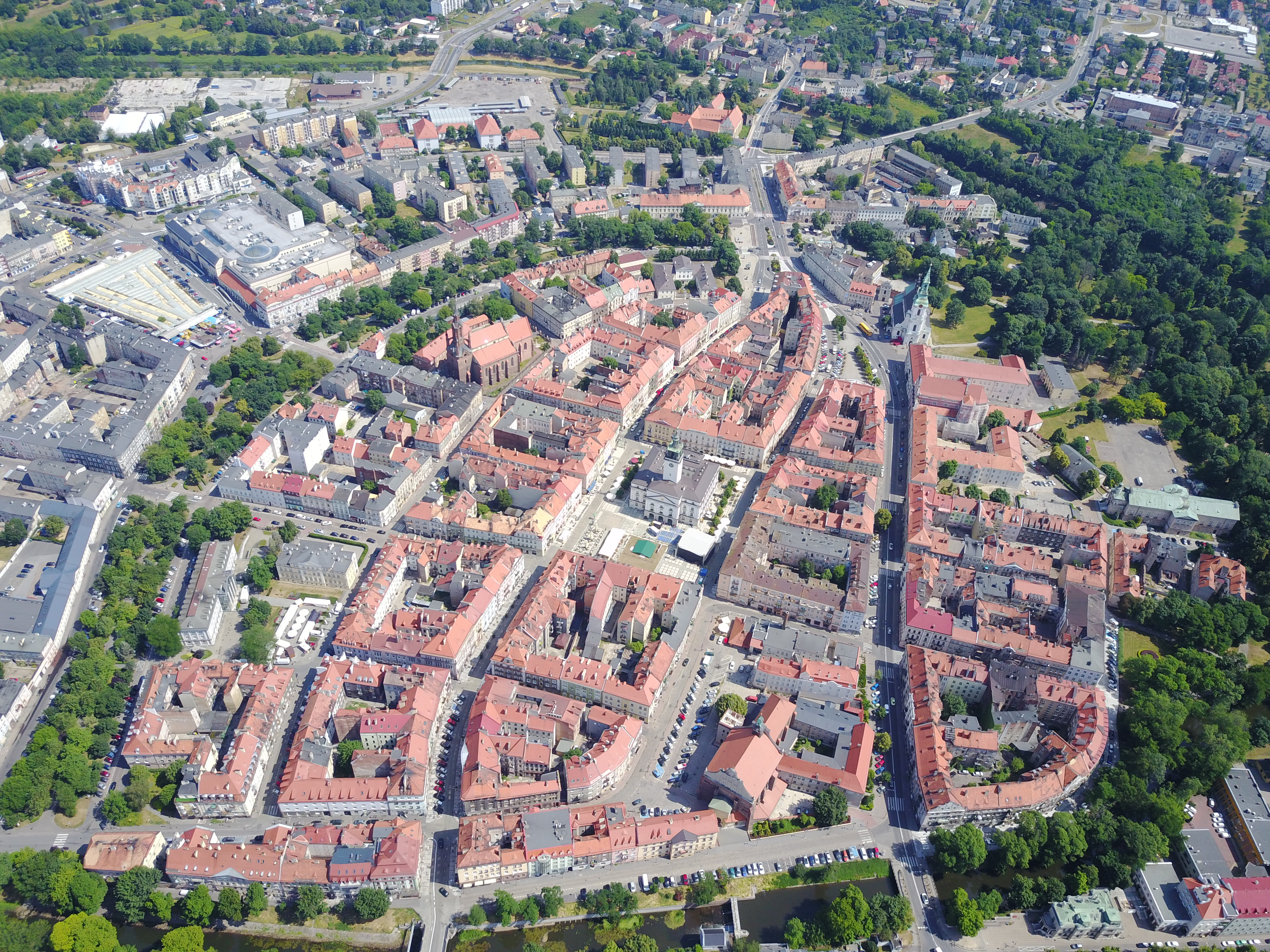
- Courthouse Stone Bridge Town Hall Former piano factory Aerial view of the Kalisz Old Town

- Flag Coat of arms
- Motto: Latin: Poloniae urbs vetustissima (The oldest city of Poland)
- Location within Poland
- Coordinates: 51°45′27″N 18°4′48″E
- Country: Poland
- Voivodeship: Greater Poland
- County: city-county
- Established: 9th century
- City rights: after 1268

Government
  - Mayor: Krystian Kinastowski (BS)

Area
  - Total: 69 km^{2} (27 sq mi)

Population (31 December 2025)
  - Total: 98,272 ▲ (38th)
  - Density: 1,416/km^{2} (3,670/sq mi)
- Time zone: UTC+1 (CET)
  - Summer (DST): UTC+2 (CEST)
- Postal code: 62-800 to 62-810
- Area code: (+48) 62
- Car plates: PK, PA
- Climate: Cfb
- Website: www.kalisz.pl

Kalisz (Polish: [ˈkaliʂ]) is a city in central Poland, and the second-largest city in the Greater Poland Voivodeship, with 97,905 residents (December 2021). It is the capital city of the Kalisz Land. Situated on the Prosna river in the southeastern part of Greater Poland, the city forms a conurbation with the nearby towns of Ostrów Wielkopolski and Nowe Skalmierzyce.

Kalisz is one of the oldest cities in Poland and one of the two traditional capitals of Greater Poland (alongside Poznań). It has served as an important regional center in Poland since the Middle Ages as a provincial capital and notable royal city. It is one of the historical burial sites of medieval Polish monarchs and dukes of the Piast dynasty and the site of a number of significant events in Polish history as well as several battles. Since the 19th century it has been the center of an industrial district. It is the cultural, scientific, educational and administrative center of the eastern and southern Greater Poland region, and the seat of Roman Catholic Diocese of Kalisz.

== Etymology ==
The name Kalisz is thought to stem from the archaic kal, meaning swamp or marsh.

== History ==
There are many artefacts from Roman times in the area of Kalisz, indicating that the settlement had once been a stop of the Roman caravans heading for the Baltic Sea along the trade route of the Amber Trail. Calisia had been mentioned by Ptolemy in the 2nd century AD, although the connection is doubted by some historians who claim that the location mentioned by Ptolemy was situated in the territory of the Diduni in Magna Germania.

=== Middle Ages ===
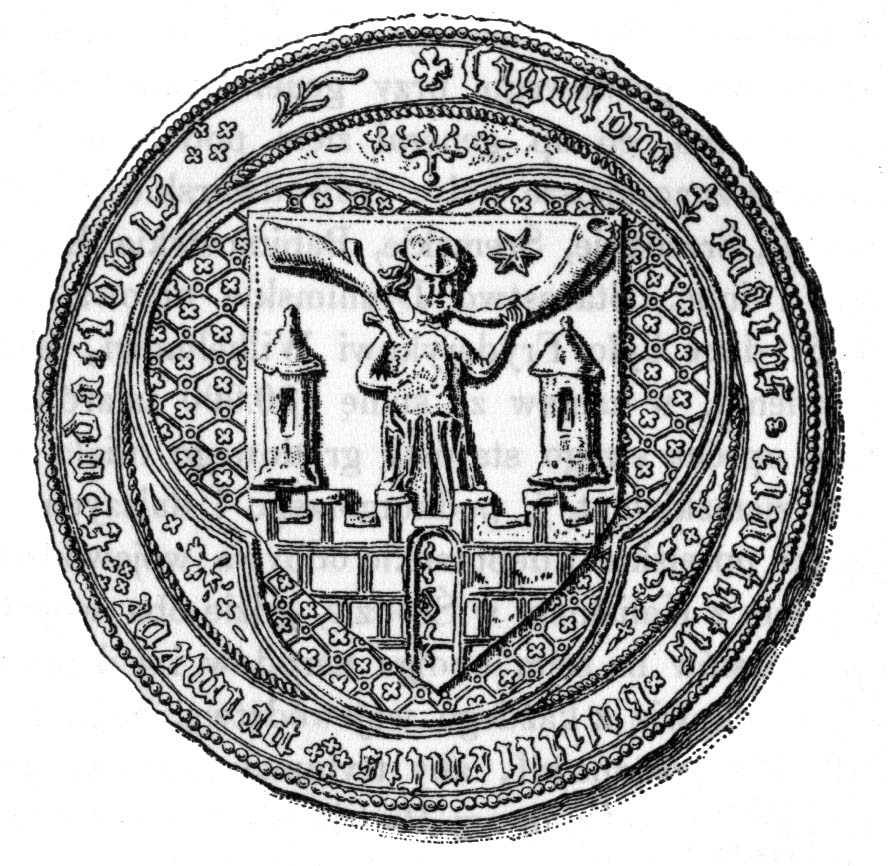
Medieval seal of Kalisz

Archaeological excavations have uncovered early medieval settlement from the Piast dynasty period, c. 9th–12th centuries. Modern Kalisz was most likely founded in the 9th century as a provincial capital castellany and a minor fort. As part of the region of Greater Poland, i.e. the cradle of the Polish state, the town formed part of Poland since the country's establishment in the 10th century.

In 1106, Bolesław III Wrymouth captured the town, and made it a part of his feudal domain. Between 1253 and 1260 the town was incorporated according to the German town law called the Środa Śląska Law (after Środa Śląska), a local variation of the Magdeburg Law, and soon began to grow. One of the richest towns of Greater Poland, during the feudal fragmentation of Poland it formed a separate duchy ruled by a local branch of the Piast dynasty.

In 1264, the Statute of Kalisz was issued in the city by Bolesław the Pious. It was a unique protective privilege for Jews during their persecution in Western Europe, which in the following centuries made Poland the destination of Jewish migration from other countries. After Poland was reunited, the town became a centre of weaving and wood products, as well as one of the cultural centres of Greater Poland.

In 1282 the city laws were confirmed by Przemysł II of Poland, and in 1314 it was made the capital of the Kalisz Voivodeship by King Ladislaus the Short. Located roughly in the centre of Poland (as its borders stood in that era), Kalisz was a centre of trade. In 1331, the city was successfully defended by the Poles during a siege by the Teutonic Knights. Because of its strategic location, King Casimir III the Great signed a peace treaty with the Teutonic Order there in 1343. As a royal city, Kalisz managed to defend many of its initial privileges, and in 1426 a new town hall was built. The Polish Duke Mieszko III the Old was buried in Kalisz. In the 14th century, Jews of the town were attacked during epidemics by mobs which accused them of poisoning the wells of the town.

=== 1500–1914 ===
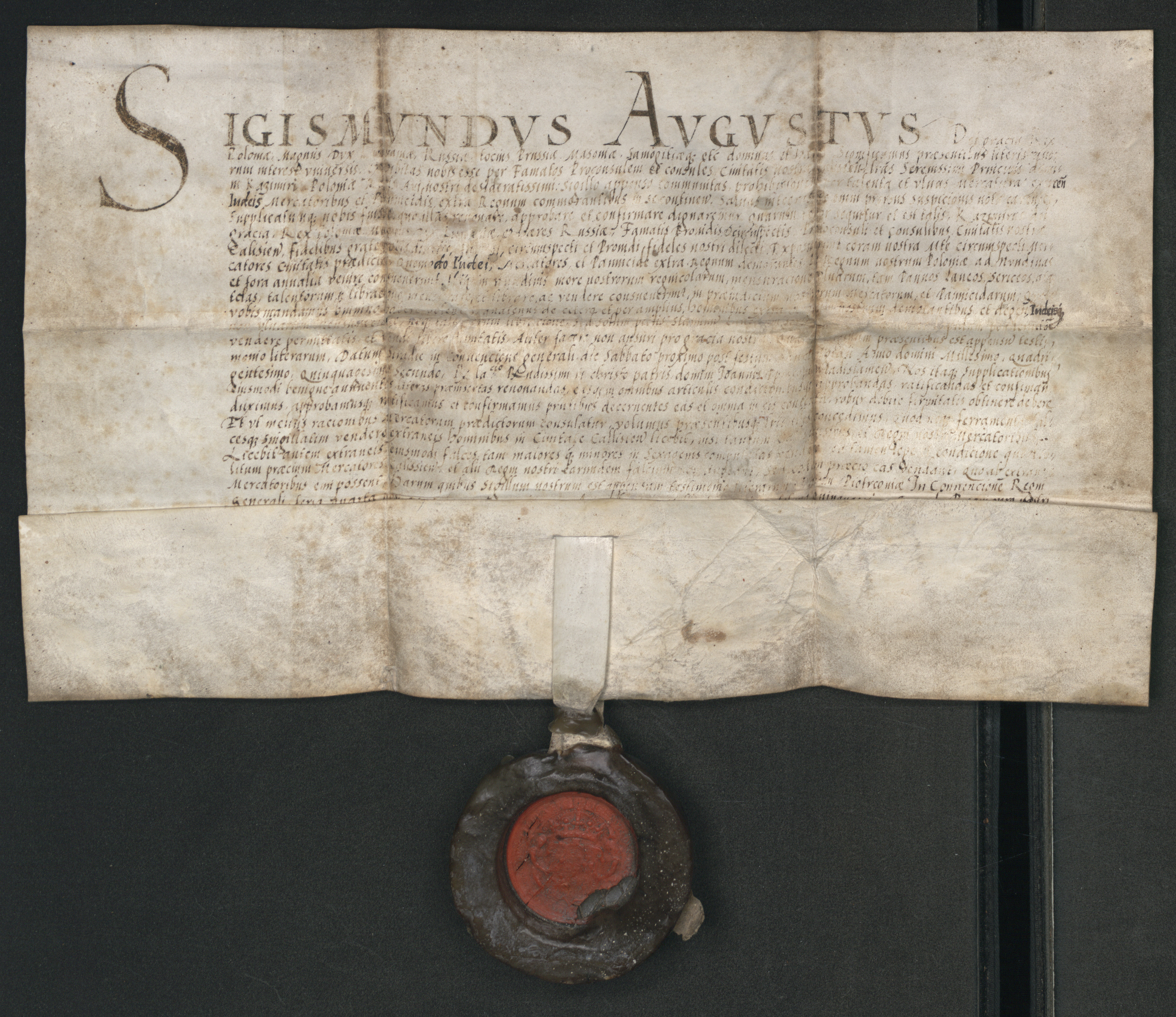
Polish King Sigismund II Augustus confirms the old privileges of Kalisz, 1552

In 1574 the Jesuits came to Kalisz and in 1584 opened a Jesuit College, which became a centre of education in Poland; around this time, however, the importance of Kalisz began to decline somewhat, its place being taken by nearby Poznań.

The economic development of the area was aided by a large number of Protestant Czech Brothers, who settled in and around Kalisz after being expelled from Bohemia in 1620.

In the 18th century, one of two main routes connecting Warsaw and Dresden ran through the city, and Kings Augustus II the Strong and Augustus III of Poland often traveled that route. As a result of conflict between Sweden, Russia, Saxony and Poland, the Battle of Kalisz took place in October 1706. In 1789, 881 Jews lived in Kalisz, 29% of the city’s population. In 1792, a fire destroyed much of the city centre.

At various times, the 1st and 7th Infantry Regiments of the Polish Crown Army were stationed in Kalisz.

In 1793, in the Second Partition of Poland, the Kingdom of Prussia absorbed the city, called Kalisch in German. That year Jews were 40% of the population. In 1801, Wojciech Bogusławski set up one of the first permanent theatre troupes in Kalisz.

In 1806, the 8th Polish Infantry Regiment was formed in Kalisz and the 6th Polish Infantry Regiment was formed in the present-day district of Dobrzec. After the successful Greater Poland uprising of 1806, it was regained by Poles and became a provincial capital within the short-lived Duchy of Warsaw. During Napoleon's invasion of Russia, following Yorck's Convention of Tauroggen of 1812, von Stein's Treaty of Kalisz was signed between Russia and Prussia in 1813, confirming that Prussia now was on the side of the Allies.

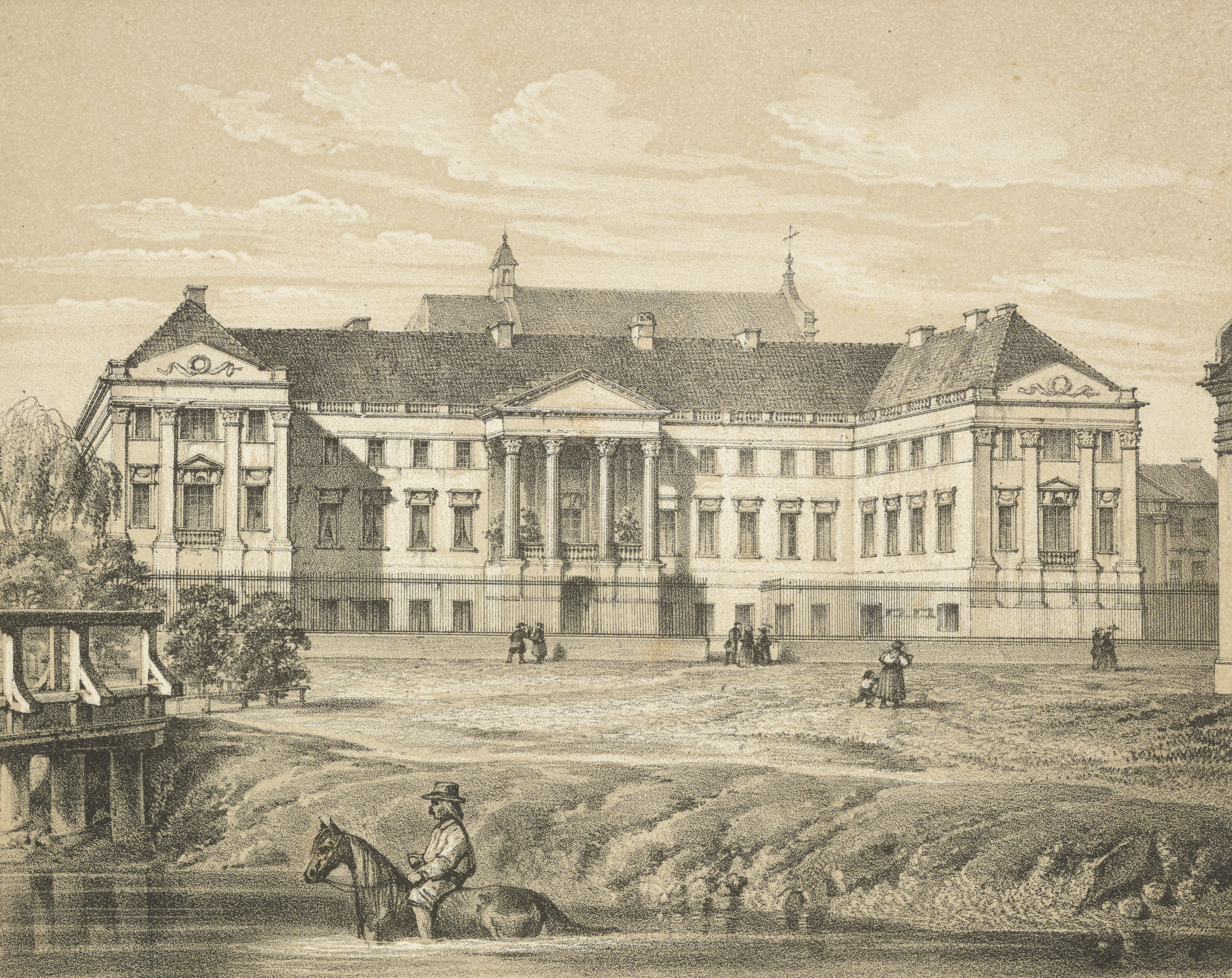
Voivodeship office in the 19th century, now the county office

After the defeat of Napoleon Bonaparte, Kalisz became a provincial capital of Congress Poland and then the capital of a province of the Russian Empire. In the 1820s a special Jewish quarter was created where the third of the town that was Jewish was required to live; it existed until 1862. Fryderyk Chopin visited Kalisz in 1826, 1828 and 1830. Prussia and Russia held joint military exercises near the town in 1835. The proximity to the Prussian border accelerated economic development of the city and Kalisz ("Калиш" in Russian Cyrillic) began to attract many settlers, not only from other regions of Poland and other provinces of the Russian Empire, but also from German states. In 1860, 4,423 Jews lived in the town, 34.5% of its residents. During the January Uprising, on April 15, 1863, Polish insurgents fought two victorious clashes against the Russians near the city. In 1881, Russian authorities expelled Jewish residents who lacked Russian citizenship. In 1897, the Jewish population of the town was 7,580, about one-third of the total population.

In 1902, a new railway linked Kalisz to Warsaw and Łódź. Since the 19th century, Kalisz has been one of the leading Polish centers of piano manufacturing. In the early 20th century, it became the leading center, surpassing Warsaw.

=== World War I and interwar period ===
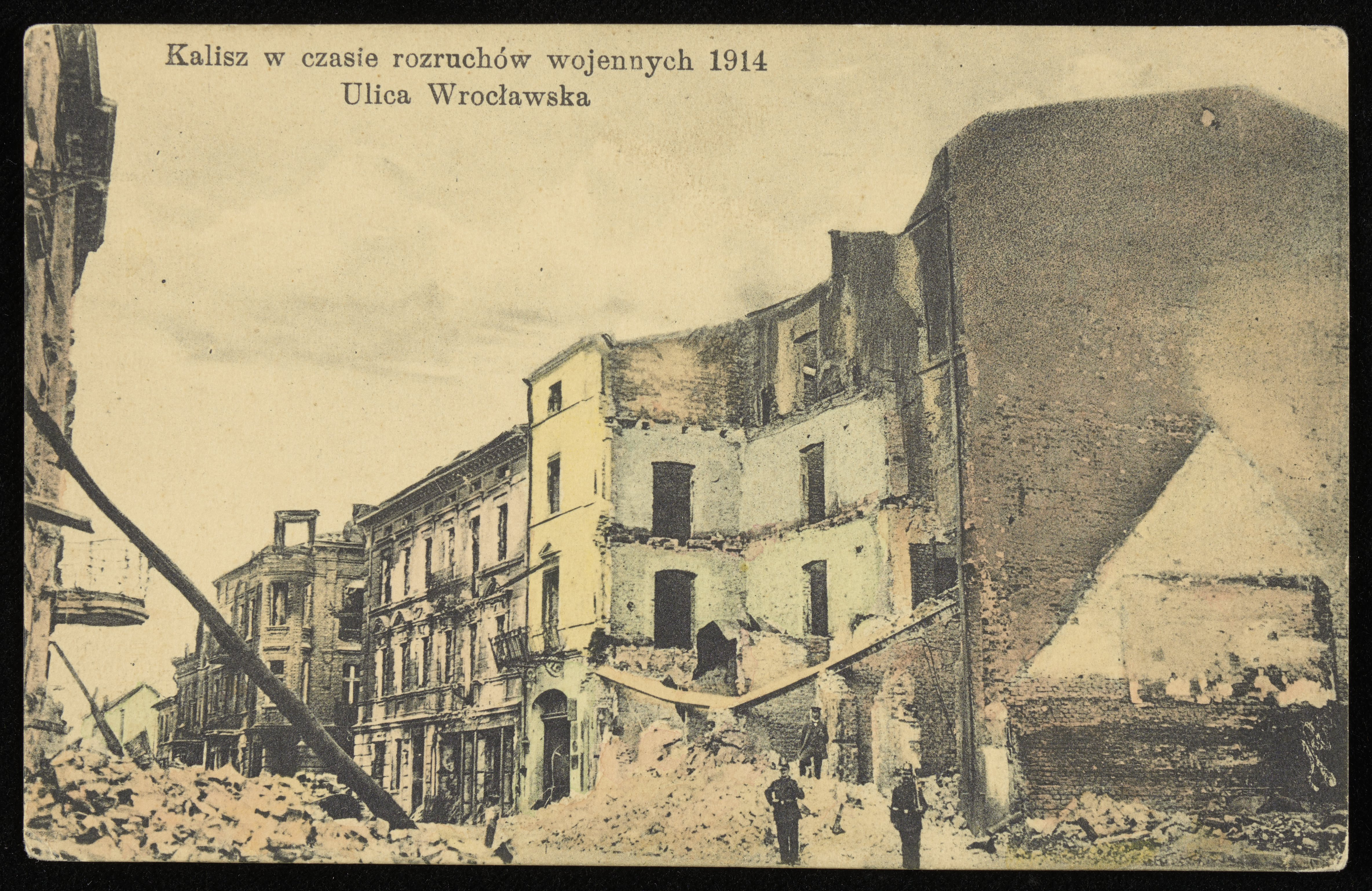
World War I destruction in Kalisz

With the outbreak of World War I, the proximity of the border with Prussia proved disastrous for Kalisz; it was one of the first cities destroyed in 1914. Between 2 and 22 August, Kalisz was shelled and then burned to the ground by German forces under Major Hermann Preusker, even though Russian troops had retreated from the city without defending it and German troops – many of them ethnic Poles – had initially been welcomed peaceably. Eight hundred men were arrested and then several of them slaughtered, while the city was set on fire and the remaining inhabitants were expelled. Out of roughly 68,000 citizens in 1914, only 5,000 remained in Kalisz a year later. By the end of the Great War, however, much of the city centre had been more or less rebuilt and many of the former inhabitants had been allowed to return.

After the war Kalisz became part of the newly independent Poland. On December 13, 1918, the First Border Battalion, composed of volunteers from Kalisz and Ostrów Wielkopolski, was sworn in Kalisz, before joining the ongoing Greater Poland uprising (1918–19) against Germany. The reconstruction continued and in 1925 a new city hall was opened. In the 1931 Polish census, Kalisz had a population of 15,300 Jews, nearly 30% of the city's total population. In 1939 the population of Kalisz was approximately 81,000. The Jewish population of Kalisz at the time was 27,000.

=== World War II ===
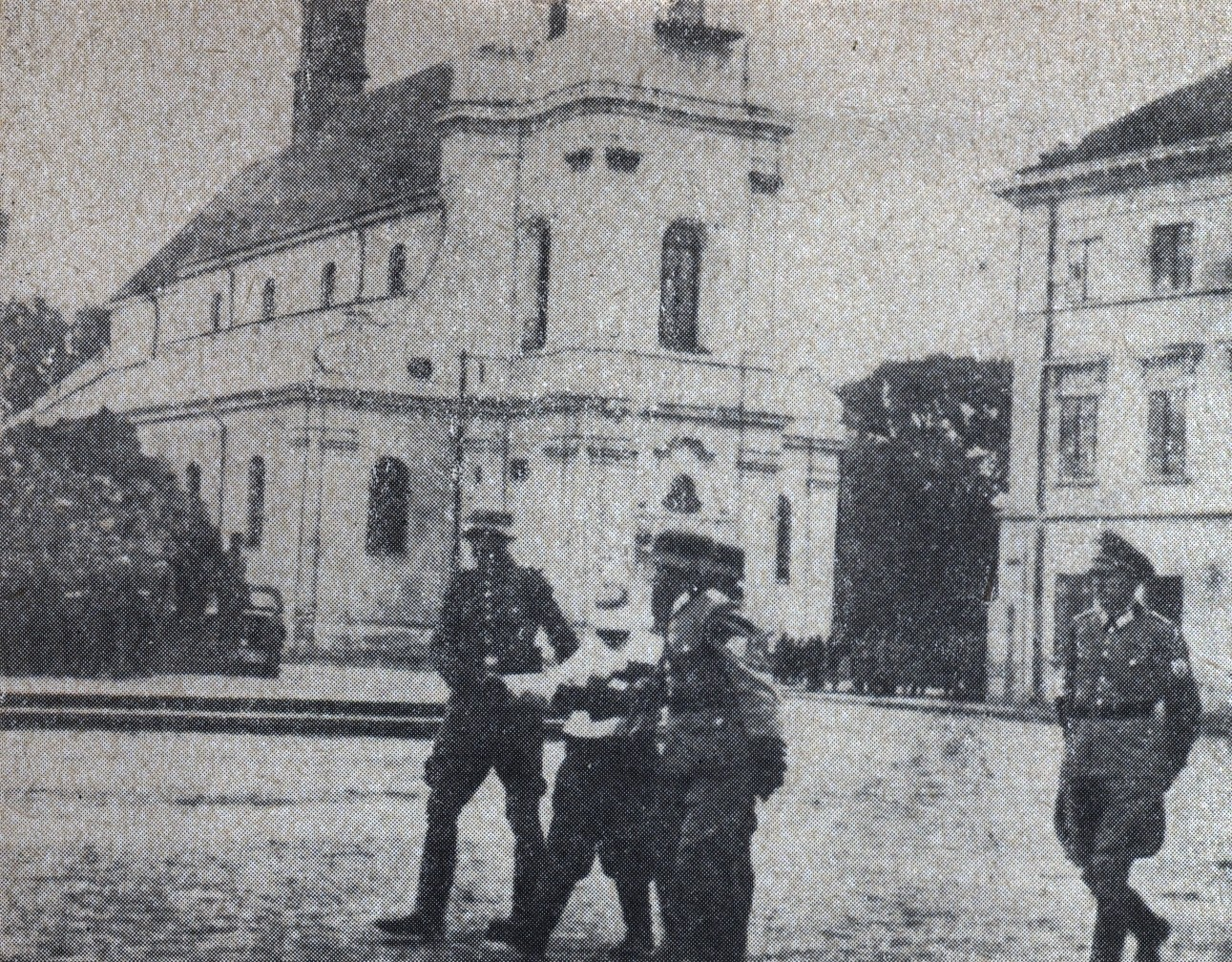
Execution of a Polish priest by the Germans in 1939

After the German invasion of Poland in September 1939, the proximity of the border once again proved disastrous. Kalisz was captured by the Wehrmacht after Polish resistance, and the city was annexed by Germany. In revenge for resistance, the Wehrmacht carried out massacres of Polish defenders, who were executed both in the city and in the nearby settlement of Winiary (today, a district of Kalisz). Over 1,000 people were arrested as hostages. Numerous Poles were arrested and murdered during the Intelligenzaktion aimed at annihilation of the Polish intelligentsia. Around 750 Poles from Kalisz, Ostrów Wielkopolski, and other nearby settlements were imprisoned in the Kalisz prison from September 1939 to March 1940, and most were murdered in large massacres in the Winiary forest. In November 1939, the Einsatzgruppe VI Nazi paramilitary killing squad murdered 41 Poles at the local Jewish cemetery; among the victims was pre-war Polish mayor of Kalisz, Ignacy Bujnicki. In April and May 1940, many Poles arrested in the region, especially teachers, were imprisoned in the local prison, and afterwards deported to the Mauthausen and Dachau concentration camps, where they were murdered.

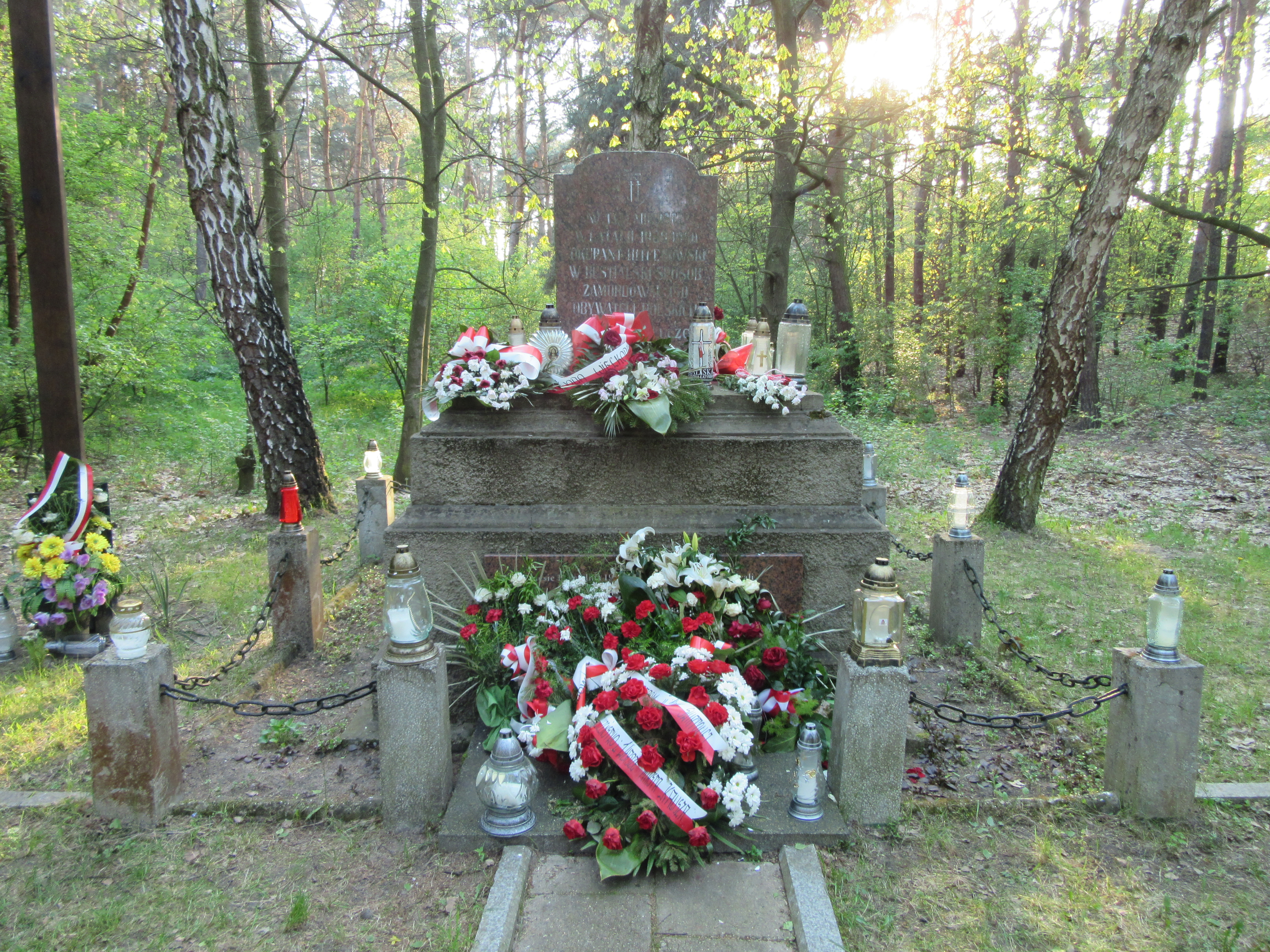
Memorial at the site of a massacre of 150 Poles in Winiary

In Kalisz, the Germans established a Germanisation camp for Polish children taken away from their parents (Gaukinderheim). The children were given new German names and surnames, and were punished for any use of the Polish language, even with death (e.g., a 14-year-old boy Zygmunt Światłowski was murdered). After their stay in the camp, the children were deported to Germany; only some returned to Poland after the war, while the fate of many remains unknown to this day. In Kalisz there were three German prisons, operated by the Gestapo, the Ministry of Justice and the local German court. The occupiers also established a forced labour subcamp of the Stalag XXI-D prisoner-of-war camp.

Kalisz was an important center of Polish resistance. In October 1939, the Organizacja Jedności Narodowej (National Unity Organization) secret Polish military organization was established in Kalisz, and later also local units of other organizations were active, including Service for Poland's Victory/Union of Armed Struggle/Home Army, Zagra-Lin, National Military Organization, and Miecz i Pług (Sword and Plow). Polish spy and resistance member Alfred Nowacki founded a food processing company in Winiary, which became a focal point of the Kalisz unit of the Home Army, and Nowacki fictitiously employed his Polish underground associates there. In the Franciscan monastery, the resistance movement set up a transfer point for people threatened with arrest. A Polish underground newspaper was issued in Kalisz, and also Polish underground press from Ostrów Wielkopolski and Września was distributed here. The commander of the local unit of the Service for Poland's Victory was arrested and sent to the Auschwitz concentration camp in 1941, the commander of the local unit of the National Military Organization was killed during a German roundup in 1943, the commander of the Kalisz District of the Home Army escaped from German captivity and then fought in the Warsaw Uprising in 1944, and the leader of the National Unity Organization put up armed resistance and managed to escape arrest by the Gestapo. Several other resistance members were captured and executed by the occupiers.

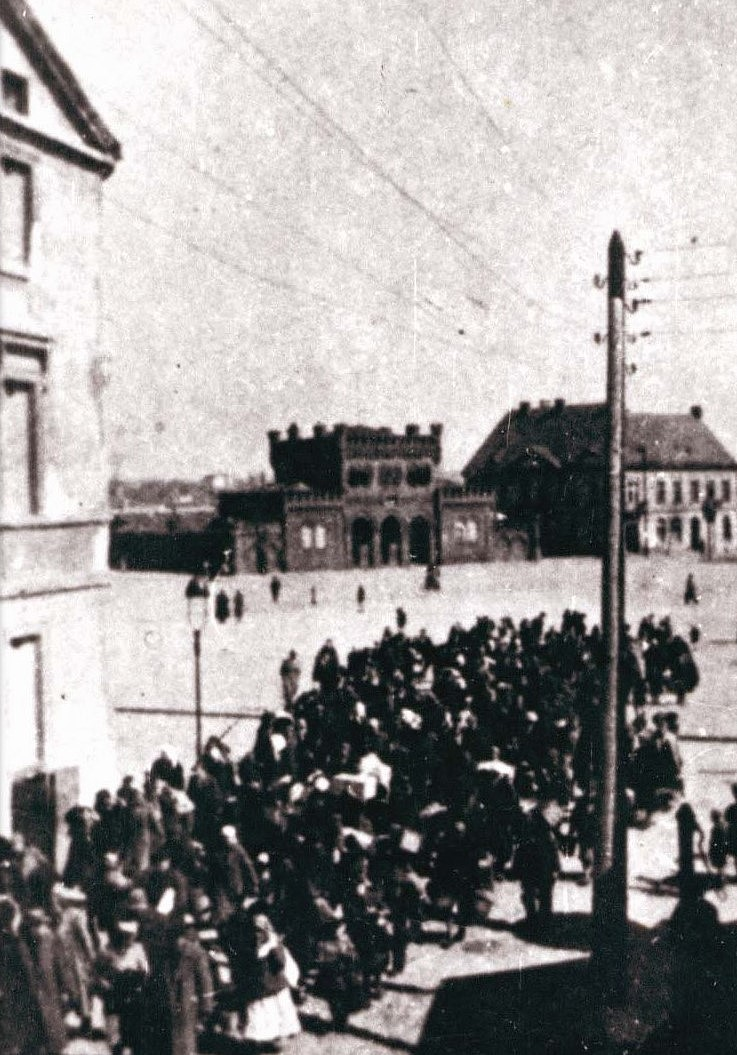
Deportation of Kalisz Jews

By the end of World War II approximately 30,000 local Jews had been murdered, and 20,000 local Catholics were either murdered or expelled to the more eastern part of German-occupied Poland (General Government) or to Germany as slave workers. In 1945 the population of the city was 43,000 – approximately half the pre-war figure. In 1945, Kalisz was restored to Poland, although with a Soviet-installed communist regime, which stayed in power until the Fall of Communism in 1989.

Following the war, Jewish Holocaust survivors returned to the city, by 1946 numbering some 500. By the late 1940s only some 100 remained, and those few who stayed blended into Polish society.

=== 1950-present ===
In 1975, after Edward Gierek's reform of the administrative division of Poland, Kalisz again became the capital of a province – Kalisz Voivodeship; the province was abolished in 1998, however, and since then Kalisz has been the county seat of a separate powiat within the Greater Poland Voivodeship. In 1976, the city limits were greatly expanded by the incorporation of the surrounding settlements of Majków, Nosków, Piwonice and Szczypiorno as new districts. The Polish anti-communist resistance Movement for Defence of Human and Civic Rights issued independent underground press in the city. In August 1980, employees of local factories joined the nationwide anti-communist strikes, which led to the foundation of the Solidarity organization, which played a central role in the end of communist rule in Poland.

In 1991 the city festival was inaugurated on 11 June to commemorate the confirmation of the incorporation of the city in 1282. In 1992, Kalisz became the seat of a separate diocese of the Catholic Church. In 1997 Kalisz was visited by Pope John Paul II.

The city was the site of the former 'Calisia' piano factory, until it went out of business in 2007. The factory building was transformed into the Calisia One Hotel, which opened in 2019.

== Climate ==
Kalisz has an oceanic climate (Köppen climate classification: Cfb) using the −3 °C (27 °F) isotherm or a humid continental climate (Köppen climate classification: Dfb) using the 0 °C (32 °F) isotherm.

Climate data for Kalisz (1991–2020 normals, extremes 1951–present)
Month	Jan	Feb	Mar	Apr	May	Jun	Jul	Aug	Sep	Oct	Nov	Dec	Year
Record high °C (°F)	13.8 (56.8)	18.1 (64.6)	22.7 (72.9)	29.8 (85.6)	31.4 (88.5)	36.6 (97.9)	36.9 (98.4)	38.0 (100.4)	35.1 (95.2)	27.2 (81.0)	19.3 (66.7)	15.8 (60.4)	38.0 (100.4)
Mean daily maximum °C (°F)	1.7 (35.1)	3.4 (38.1)	7.8 (46.0)	14.6 (58.3)	19.4 (66.9)	22.8 (73.0)	25.2 (77.4)	25.0 (77.0)	19.4 (66.9)	13.3 (55.9)	7.2 (45.0)	2.9 (37.2)	13.6 (56.5)
Daily mean °C (°F)	−0.8 (30.6)	0.3 (32.5)	3.7 (38.7)	9.4 (48.9)	14.1 (57.4)	17.3 (63.1)	19.5 (67.1)	19.3 (66.7)	14.4 (57.9)	9.2 (48.6)	4.4 (39.9)	0.6 (33.1)	9.3 (48.7)
Mean daily minimum °C (°F)	−3.0 (26.6)	−2.3 (27.9)	0.3 (32.5)	4.6 (40.3)	9.0 (48.2)	12.3 (54.1)	14.2 (57.6)	14.2 (57.6)	10.1 (50.2)	5.9 (42.6)	2.1 (35.8)	−1.6 (29.1)	5.5 (41.9)
Record low °C (°F)	−28.5 (−19.3)	−28.3 (−18.9)	−21.1 (−6.0)	−7.2 (19.0)	−3.8 (25.2)	2.4 (36.3)	4.0 (39.2)	4.8 (40.6)	−1.7 (28.9)	−7.4 (18.7)	−16.6 (2.1)	−25.1 (−13.2)	−28.5 (−19.3)
Average precipitation mm (inches)	26.4 (1.04)	24.3 (0.96)	33.2 (1.31)	26.9 (1.06)	53.0 (2.09)	54.8 (2.16)	77.3 (3.04)	54.3 (2.14)	46.0 (1.81)	36.8 (1.45)	31.0 (1.22)	29.7 (1.17)	493.8 (19.44)
Average extreme snow depth cm (inches)	5.0 (2.0)	4.2 (1.7)	2.4 (0.9)	0.8 (0.3)	0.0 (0.0)	0.0 (0.0)	0.0 (0.0)	0.0 (0.0)	0.0 (0.0)	0.2 (0.1)	1.5 (0.6)	3.6 (1.4)	5.0 (2.0)
Average precipitation days (≥ 0.1 mm)	15.17	13.33	13.00	10.47	12.50	13.00	13.40	11.70	10.87	12.43	13.13	15.13	154.13
Average snowy days (≥ 0 cm)	12.5	10.2	4.8	0.7	0.0	0.0	0.0	0.0	0.0	0.1	1.9	7.1	37.3
Average relative humidity (%)	87.9	84.7	79.3	71.1	72.5	72.9	71.9	71.2	78.2	84.3	89.4	89.4	79.4
Mean monthly sunshine hours	49.3	69.6	120.8	195.2	248.1	253.4	253.3	242.9	160.5	110.7	52.0	41.0	1,796.7
Source 1: Institute of Meteorology and Water Management
Source 2: Meteomodel.pl (records, relative humidity 1991–2020)

== City neighbourhoods ==
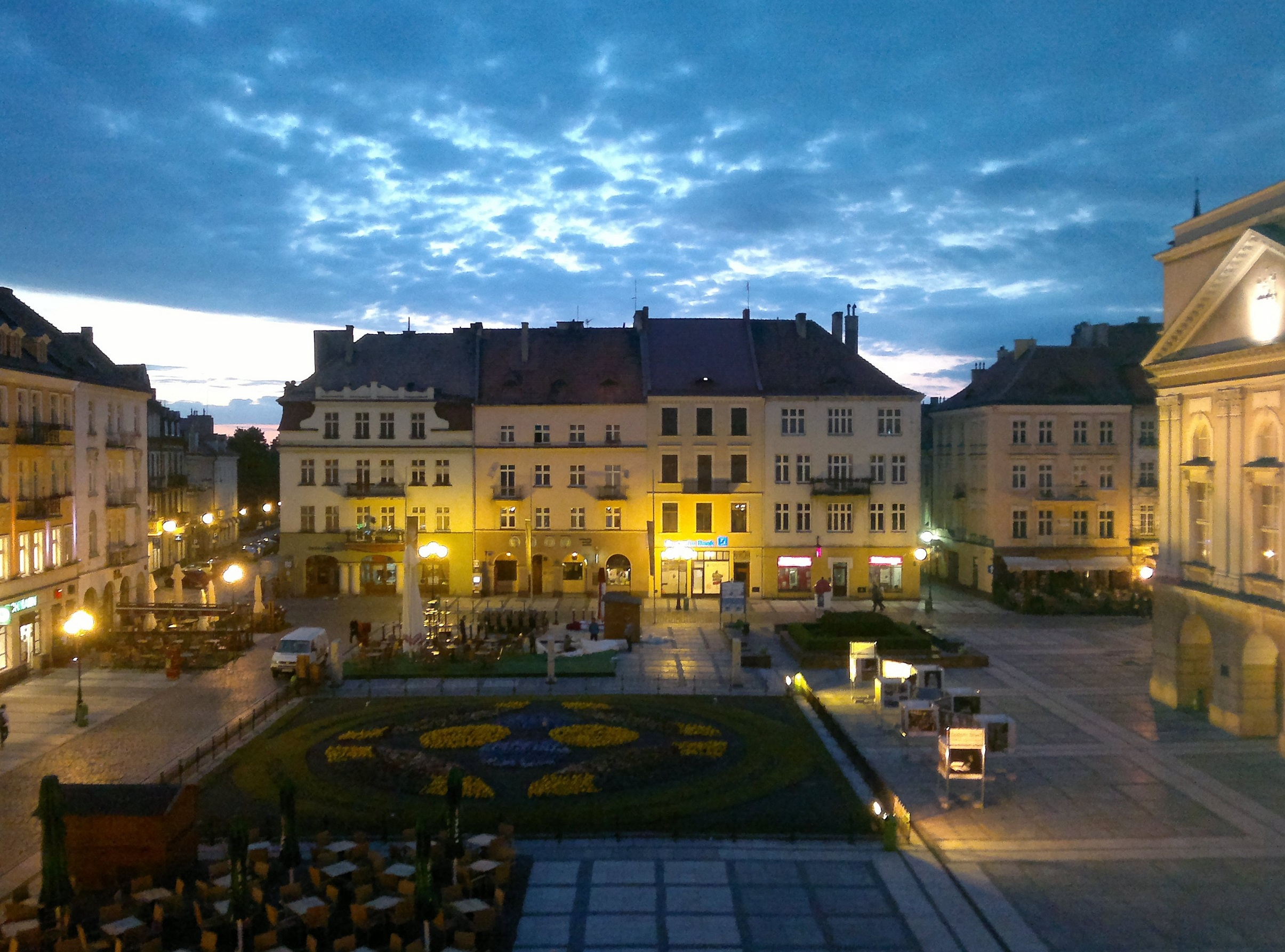
Market Square at dusk

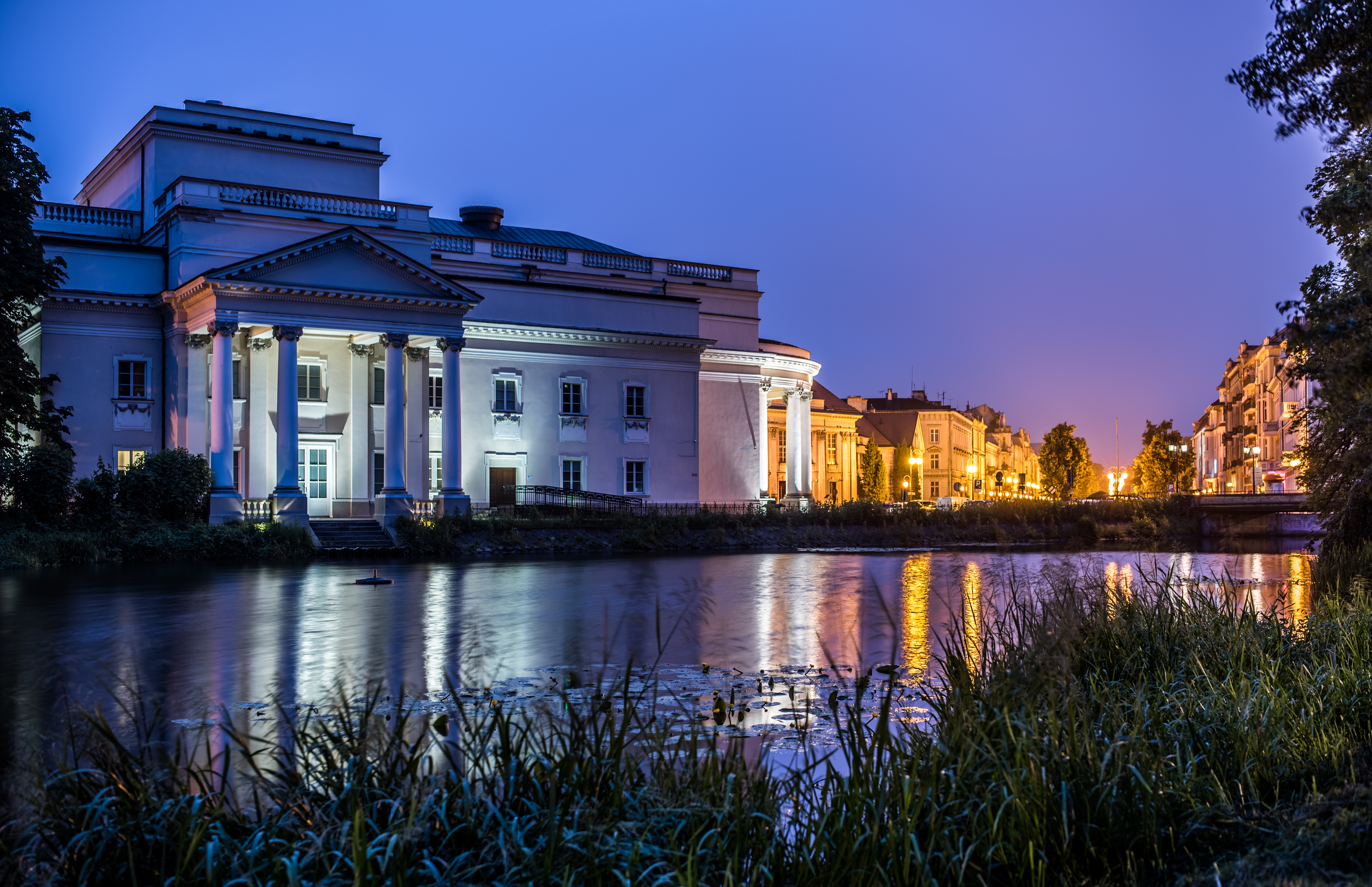
Wojciech Bogusławski Theatre in Kalisz

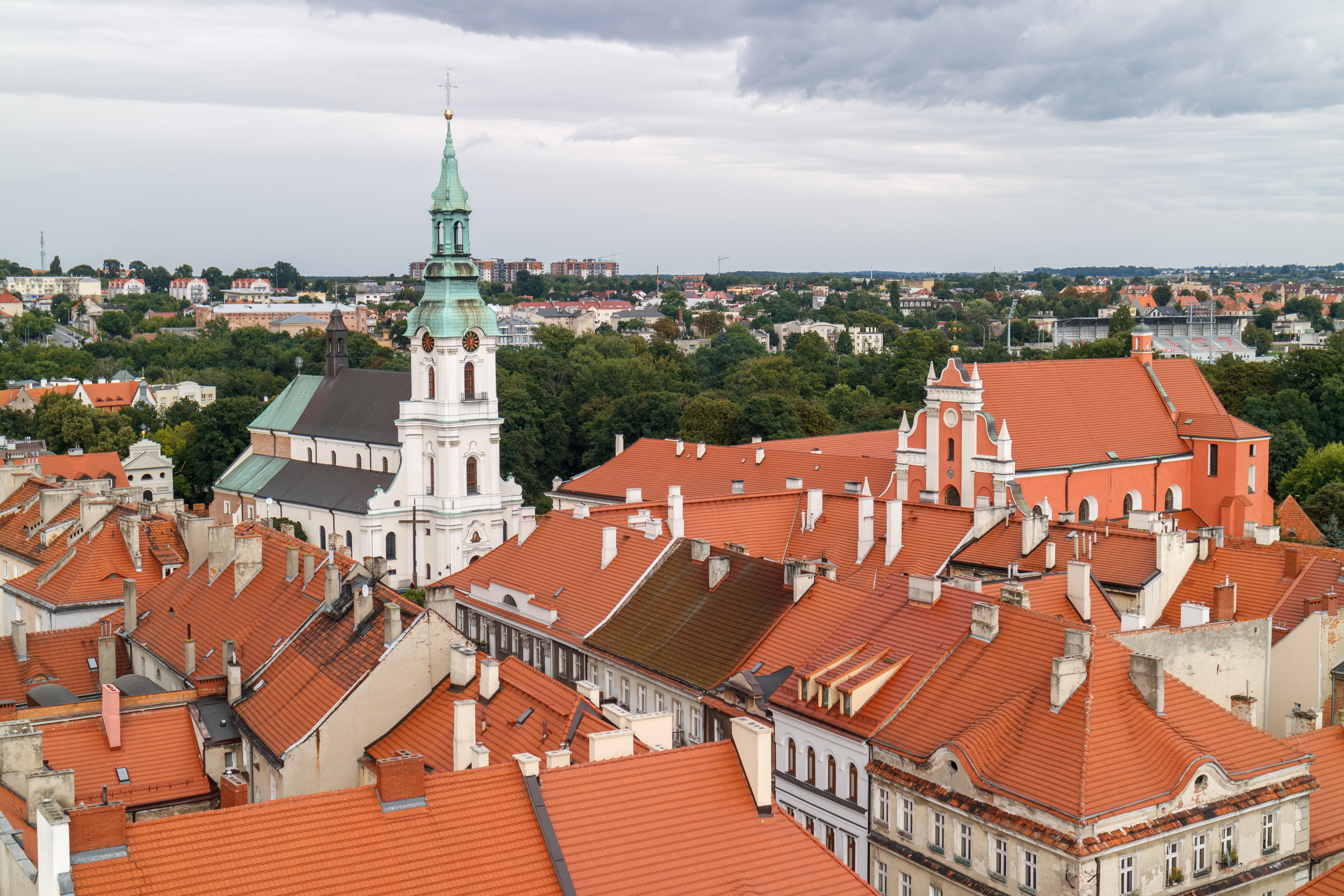
Old Town with the Collegiate Basilica of the Assumption of the Blessed Virgin Mary on the left

Neighborhoods of Kalisz
Name	Population	Area (km^{2})	Area (mi^{2})
Asnyka	5697	0.44	0.1698849
Chmielnik	3612	3.28	1.266415
Czaszki	7130	0.67	0.2586884
Dobro	597	1.96	0.7567602
Dobrzec	867	8.62	3.328201
Dobrzec P	8599	1.51	0.5830143
Dobrzec W	5503	0.38	0.146719
Kaliniec	4685	0.36	0.1389968
Korczak	4459	0.73	0.281855
Majków	3311	2.96	1.142862
Ogrody	2073	2.06	0.7953704
Piskorzewie	1915	1.99	0.7683433
Piwonice	2660	8.72	3.366811
Rajsków	1884	3.43	1.32433
Rogatka	2720	0.27	0.1042476
Rypinek	3708	4.48	1.729738
Sulisławice	835	4.68	1.806958
Sulisławice Kolonia	164	1.19	0.4594616
Szczypiorno	1529	5.87	2.26642
Śródmieście	17258	1.76	0.6795398
Tyniec	4189	3.02	1.166029
Widok	6516	0.44	0.1698849
Winiary	2491	5.40	2.08495
XXV-lecia	5094	1.02	0.3938242
Zagorzynek	2773	3.89	1.501937

== Religion ==
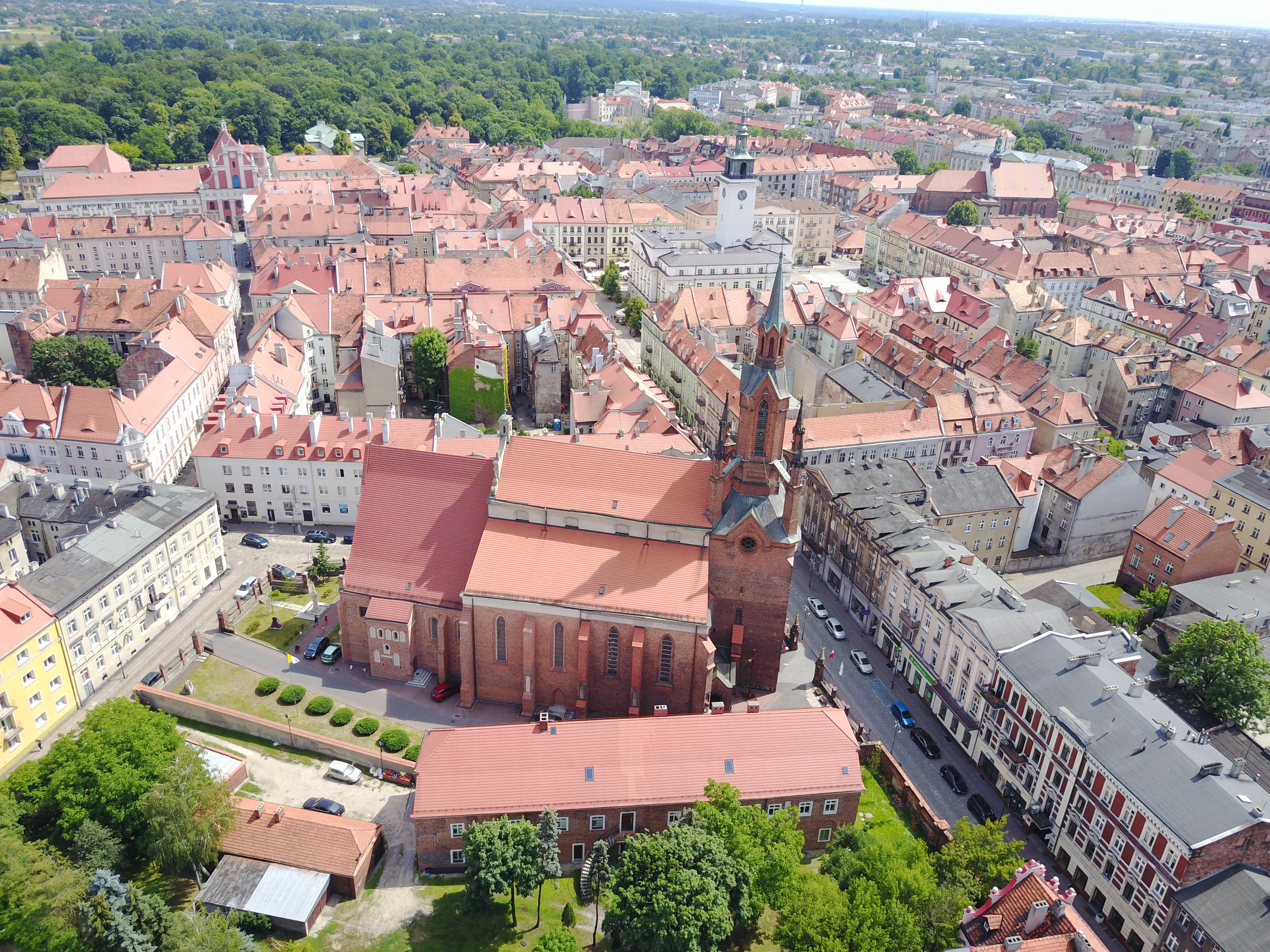
Saint Nicholas Cathedral in the Old Town

There are 19 Catholic churches, five Protestant churches, and one Eastern Orthodox church in Kalisz. The city contains the Cathedral of St. Nicholas. Synagogues were built in Kalisz beginning in 1698, and a New Synagogue was built in 1879. Before World War II there were 25,000 Jews in Kalisz, but most of them were murdered by Germans in the Holocaust in Poland and by the summer of 1942 the Jewish community in Kalisz was entirely destroyed.

== Education ==
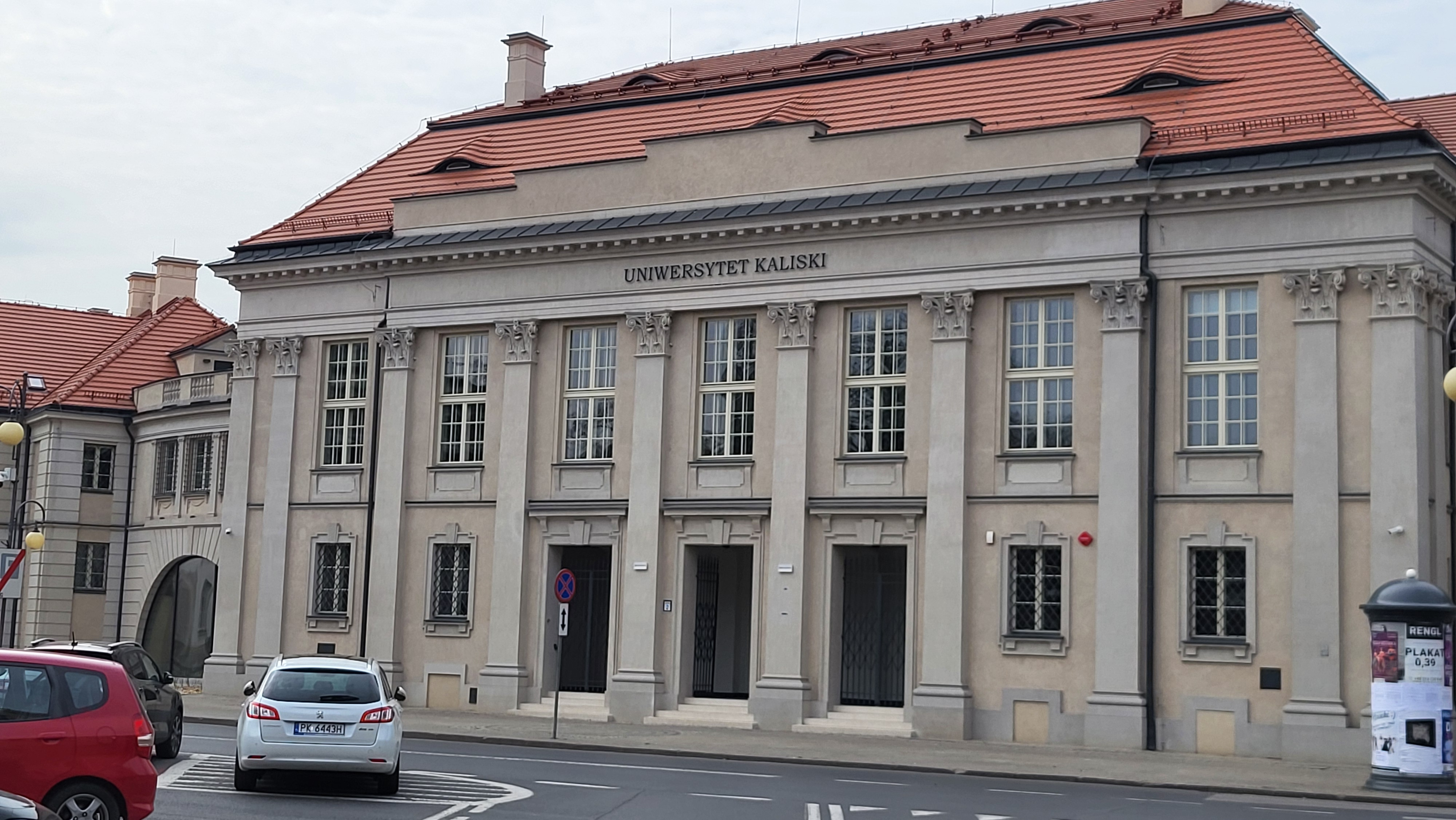
University of Kalisz

Kalisz is a centre of education in the region. Its chief higher edeucation institution is the University of Kalisz. The city is also home to branches of Poznań University, Poznań University of Economics, and Poznań University of Technology, as well as other institutions of higher education. It is a home to the Henryk Melcer Music School. Kalisz is home to 23 primary schools and 11 high schools.

== Economy ==
Although there is little heavy industry within the city limits, Kalisz is home to several large enterprises. It has the Winiary (part of the Nestlé group) and Colian food processing plants and the Big Star jeans factory. Two plane engine production factories, WSK-Kalisz and Pratt & Whitney Kalisz (a branch of Pratt & Whitney Canada), are located in Kalisz.

== Cuisine ==
The Andruty kaliskie wafers originated in Kalisz, and are the most well-known traditional food from the city in Poland.

Another officially protected traditional specialty of the area (as designated by the Ministry of Agriculture and Rural Development of Poland) are homemade cold pressed juices from fresh fruits of the Kalisz Land, produced according to traditional recipes without any additional ingredients. These include juices from apples, pears, cherries, blackcurrant, redcurrant, strawberries and raspberries. The tradition dates back several centuries.

== Sports ==
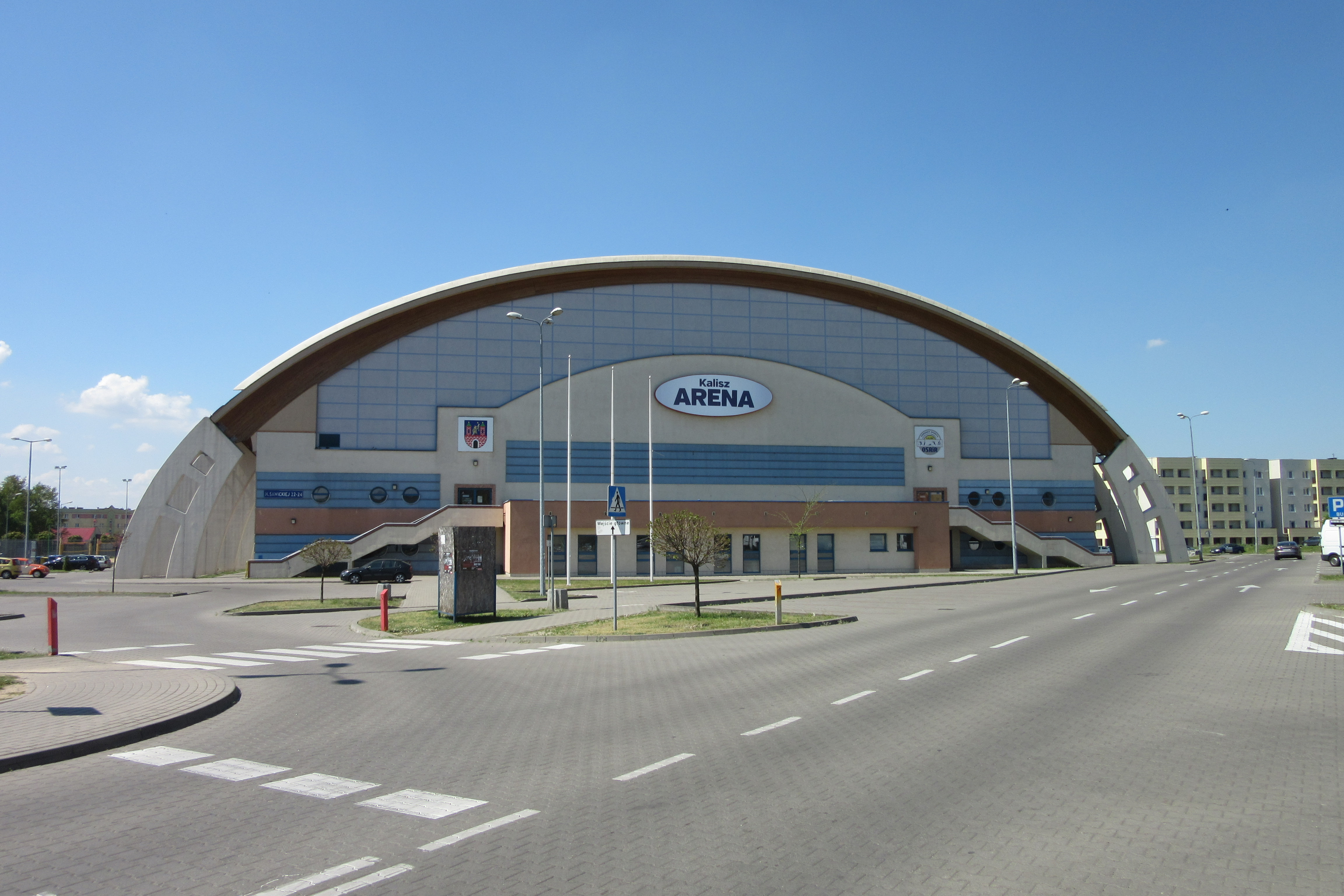
Arena Kalisz, the city's main indoor hall, home venue of the MKS Kalisz men's handball team and Calisia Kalisz women's volleyball team

The district of Szczypiorno, as the place of pioneering games of handball in Poland, is the namesake for szczypiorniak, the Polish name of the sport. Other popular sports in Kalisz include football and volleyball. Notable sports teams include:

- MKS Kalisz – men's handball team playing in the Polish Superliga (top division; as of 2021–22)
- SSK Calisia Kalisz – women's volleyball team playing in the Polish Women's Volleyball League (top division; as of 2021–22), four times Polish Champions (1997, 1998, 2005, 2007)
- KKS Kalisz – men's football team playing in the II liga (as of 2021–22)

Kalisz is also the location of Kaliskie Towarzystwo Wioślarskie, one of the oldest Polish rowing clubs, founded in 1894.

== Transport ==
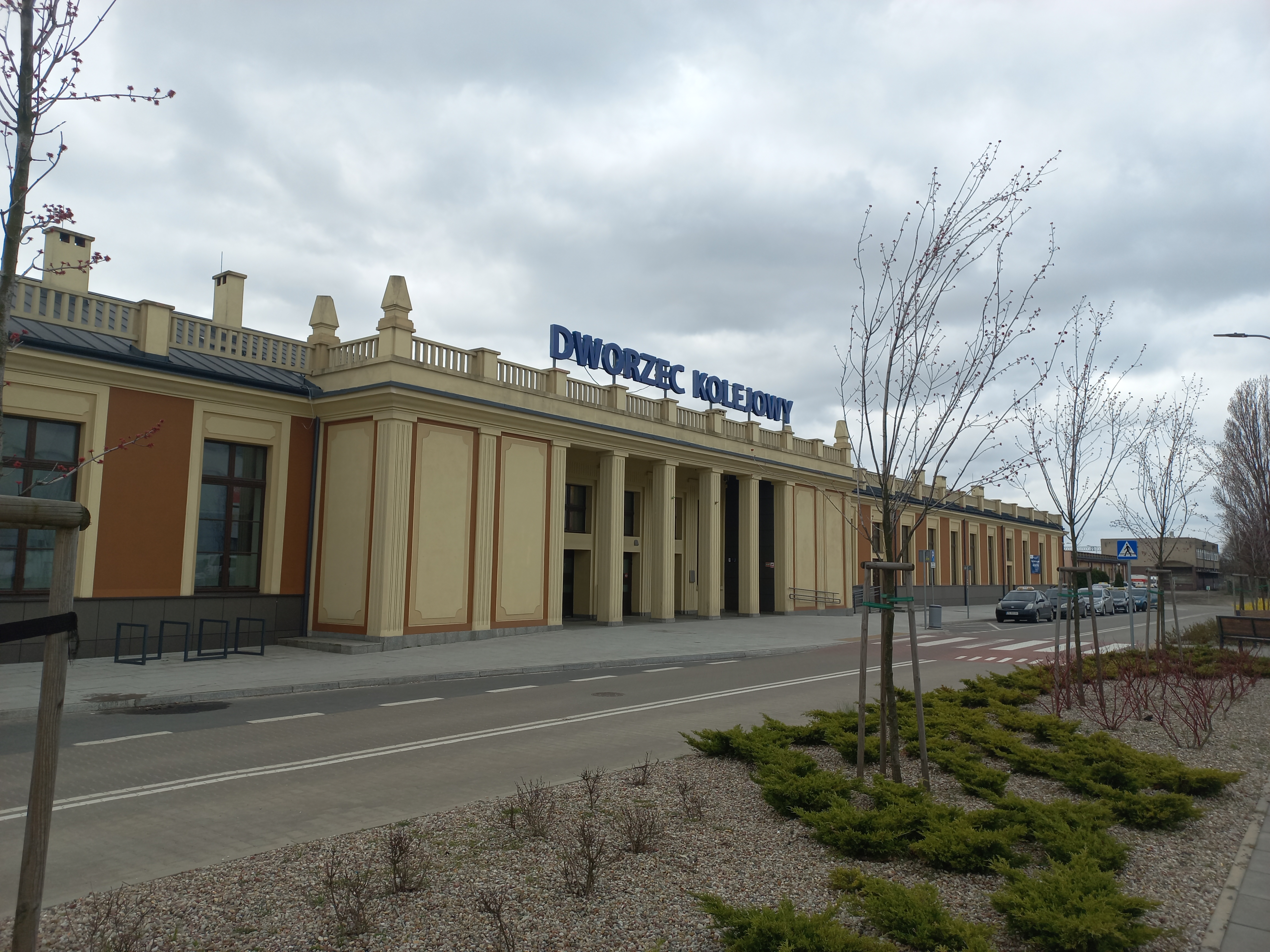
Main railway station

Kalisz railway station was built in 1902 as the destination of the Warsaw–Kalisz Railway. It is currently served by Polregio and PKP Intercity.

== Notable people ==
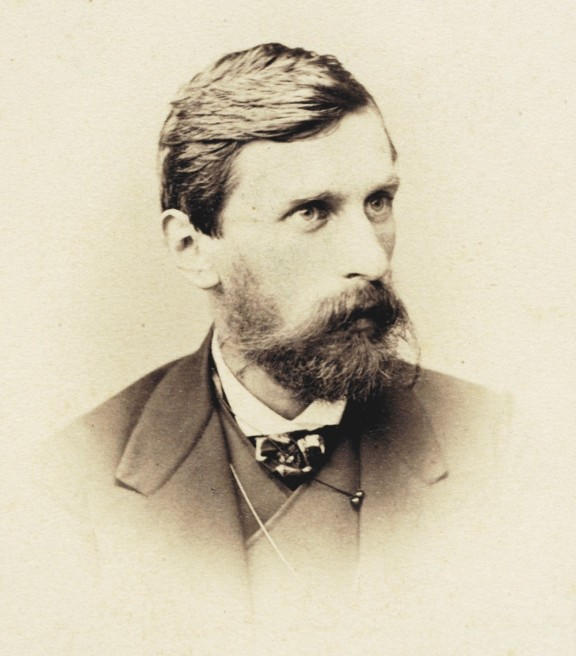
Adam Asnyk, positivist poet

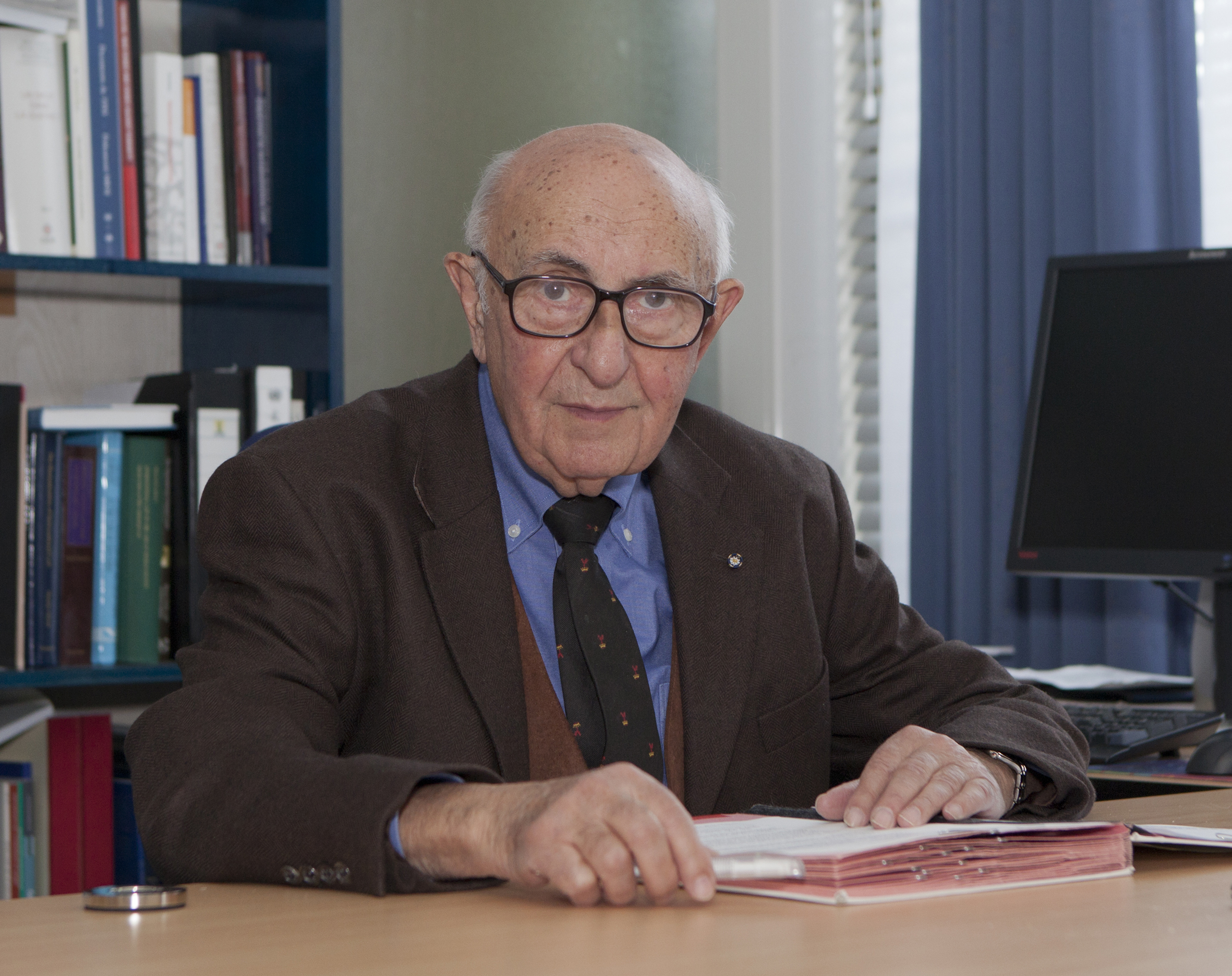
Theodor Meron, judge

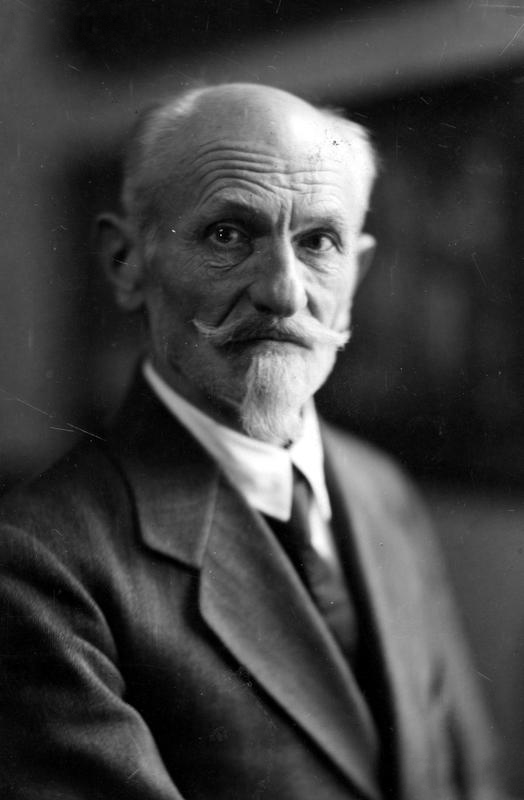
Stanisław Wojciechowski, president of Poland (1922–1926)

- Adam Asnyk (1838–1897), poet
- Meir Auerbach (1815–1878), Polish-born Israeli, author and the first Ashkenazi Chief Rabbi of Jerusalem
- Adam Balski (born 1990), professional boxer
- Shabbethai Bass (1641–1718), author and founder of Jewish bibliography
- Wojciech Bogusławski (1757–1829), actor, theater director and playwright
- Bolesław the Pious (1224/27–1279), duke of Greater Poland
- Krystyna Borowicz (1923–2009), actress
- Juliusz Bursche (1862–1942), bishop
- Maria Dąbrowska (1889–1965), writer
- Janina David, born Janina Dawidowicz (1930–2023), writer and Holocaust survivor
- Solomon Eger (1785–1852), rabbi
- Agaton Giller (1831–1887), patriotic activist
- Stefan Giller (1833–1918), poet, an epigone of the Polish Romanticism
- Cyprian Godebski (1765–1809), freedom fighter and poet
- Avraham Gombiner (1635–1682), Jewish rabbi and scholar
- Adam Hofman (born 1980), politician
- Simon Horontchik (1889–1939), Polish-Yiddish novelist and short story writer
- Julian Klemczyński (1807–1851), composer
- Augustyn Kordecki (1603–1673), prior of the Jasna Góra Monastery and hero of The Deluge
- Alfred Kowalski (1849–1915), painter
- Yehiel Krize (1908–1968) Polish-born Israeli painter
- Jerzy Kryszak (born 1950), actor
- Theodor Meron (born 1930), Polish-born American president of the International Criminal Tribunal for the former Yugoslavia and judge in the International Criminal Tribunal for Rwanda
- Bonawentura Niemojowski (1787–1835), journalist
- Wincenty Niemojowski (1784–1834), journalist
- Antoni Pietkiewicz (born 1948), engineer, businessperson, and politician
- Ladislaus Pilars de Pilar (1874–1952), poet
- Leopold Pilichowski (1869–1933), realist painter
- Zofia Poznańska (1906–1942), anti-Nazi resistance fighter
- Adolph Moses Radin (1848–1909), rabbi
- Stanisław Saks (1897–1942), mathematician, member of the Polish Underground State, killed by the Gestapo
- Wojciech Siemion (1928–2010), actor and director
- Zdzisława Sośnicka (born 1945), singer
- Mischa Spoliansky (1898–1985), composer
- Jerzy Świrski (1882–1959), vice admiral
- Alina Szapocznikow (1926–1973), sculptor and Holocaust survivor
- Stefan Szolc-Rogoziński (1861–1896), traveler and explorer
- Stanislaw Szymanski (1862–1944), factory manager, industrialist, and activist
- Alicja Tchórz (born 1992), swimmer
- Marta Walczykiewicz (born 1987), sprint canoer, Olympic medalist
- Chaim Elozor Wax (1822–1889), Hasidic rabbi and philanthropist
- Stanisław Wojciechowski (1869–1953), president of Poland
- Jan Ptaszyn Wróblewski (born 1936), musician
- Iga Wyrwał (born 1989), glamour model
- Eve Zaremba (1930–2025), Polish-born Canadian writer
- Urszula Zybura (born 1952), poet

== Twin towns ==
Kalisz is twinned with:

- Erfurt, Germany (since 1984)
- Hamm, Germany (since 1991)
- Hautmont, France (since 1958)
- Heerhugowaard, Netherlands (since 1992)
- Kamianets-Podilskyi, Ukraine (since 1993)
- La Louvière, Belgium (since 1998)
- Martin, Slovakia (since 1996)
- Preston, United Kingdom (since 1989)
- Adria, Italy
- Figueres, Spain
- Lovech, Bulgaria
- Minsk (borough of Frunze), Belarus
- Szentendre, Hungary
- Tongeren, Belgium

== See also ==
- History of the Jews in Kalisz
- Kalisz Department (Polish: Departament Kaliski): a unit of administrative division and local government in Polish Duchy of Warsaw in years 1807–1815
- Kaliszanie
