= Sanitary epidemiological reconnaissance =

Sanitary epidemiological reconnaissance, synonym epidemiological reconnaissance is a literal name of a concept and routine of finding out disease potential on a territory of arrival of major contingent. Russian: санитарно-эпидемиологическая разведка, син. эпидемиологическая разведка. This is a kind of medical reconnaissance, process of information gathering on possible infectious diseases' origin-sources, the ways and factors of the infection transfer and determining all conditions that could have promoted the spread of infestation among army service personnel. In 1939 Academician E.N.Pavlovsky announced his "doctrine of nidality", so called by Soviet biologists. People can acquire zoonoses and insect-borne diseases when they occupy at certain times of the year natural habitat of a certain pathogen (e.g., plague, tularemia, leptospirosis, arboviruses, tick-borne relapsing fever). The WHO Expert Committee on Zoonoses listed over 100 such diseases. About natural focality of the diseases is known elsewhere.

== History ==
Historically, Sanitary epidemiological reconnaissance implied collection and transfer of all data available on sanitary and epidemiological situation of the area of possible deployment and action of armed forces, the same data for the neighbouring and enemy armed forces. The aim for the reconnaissance was to clear up the reasons of the specific disease origin—sources of the infection in various extreme situations, including local wars and armed conflicts, the ways of the infection transfer and all factors promoting to the infestation. This practice has been successfully used on plague-endemic territory at the time of the Soviet–Japanese War (1945) in WWII : "Sanitary epidemiological reconnaissance was organized and conducted continuously for the entire depth of the operation. Mobile sanitary epidemiological detachments followed immediately behind the first echelon of tanks and mechanized vehicles of advancing Soviet army should they encounter any particular contagious disease. Withdrawing enemy forces had poisoned many wells and water sources". After the armed forces have become stationary during wartime and emergency of peace time the sanitary epidemiological reconnaissance turns into sanitary and epidemiological surveillance and medical control of vital and communal activity of the armed forces.

== Difference from Epidemic Intelligence Service ==
Sanitary epidemiological reconnaissance as a practice has nothing in common with the Epidemic Intelligence Service as an educational program of the United States' Centers for Disease Control and Prevention (CDC). The latter was established in 1951 by Alexander Langmuir, due to biological warfare concerns arising from the Korean War, it has become a hands-on two-year postgraduate training program in epidemiology.

== International recognition ==
The use of sanitary epidemiological reconnaissance or similar practices in the armed forces is mentioned elsewhere. The Polish contingents serving under the UN auspices focused their tasks among others on ... sanitary-epidemiological reconnaissance ... . The similar practice is recognized by the WHO and Australia while encompassing chemical, radiological hazards as well. They call it "All-hazards approach" US Department of Health and Human Services in the page 300 of its manual in admits existence of other surveillance systems calling them "early-warning systems of disease potential" with the aim to collect data on indicators of disease or disease potential: animal population (animal morbidity and mortality by a disease that can affect humans, the presence of a disease agent in wild and domestic sentinel animals, vectors of a disease) and environmental data.

== Conduction of the reconnaissance ==
There is a definite need in mobile sanitary-epidemiological groups, trained and equipped for the task. Any group for sanitary epidemiological reconnaissance includes: epidemiologist, specialist on infections, assistant of epidemiologist (bacteriologist-lab assistant), medical orderly (if necessary, the group will include zoologist or parasitologist). These units should be formed up in the deployable medical set-ups. Sanitary-epidemiological reconnaissance should result in revealing of the patients and persons, suspected to the specific disease, their isolation and hospitalization.

A sanitary-epidemiological kit is constructed, consisting of two separate units, but each adaptable to use with the other: a portable laboratory kit and a portable combination lab apparatus. The two units can be useful in the work of epidemiologists during sanitary-epidemiological reconnaissance and sanitary epidemiological surveys.

== In the 21st century ==
In 2010 at The Meeting of the States Parties to the Convention on the Prohibition of the Development, Production and Stockpiling of Bacteriological (Biological) and Toxin Weapons and Their Destruction in Geneva the sanitary epidemiological reconnaissance was suggested as well-tested means for enhancing the monitoring of infections and parasitic agents, for practical implementation of the International Health Regulations (2005). The aim was to prevent and minimize the consequences of natural outbreaks of dangerous infectious diseases as well as the threat of alleged use of biological weapons against BTWC States Parties. It is pointed out the significance of the sanitary epidemiological reconnaissance in assessing the sanitary-epidemiological situation, organizing and conducting preventive activities, indicating and identifying pathogenic biological agents in the environmental sites, conducting laboratory analysis of biological materials, suppressing hotbeds of infectious diseases, providing advisory and practical assistance to local health authorities.

Sanitary epidemiological reconnaissance (inspection) or a similar practice and specific indication in the hotbed should be performed immediately after the receiving of the information about bio-terrorism attack.

There were compiled the principles of organization of sanitary epidemiological reconnaissance and criteria for evaluating the sanitary epidemiological status of arms force and regions of their dislocation.
