= Skarszew =

- Village
- Location within Poland
- Coordinates: 51°48′N 18°10′E
- Country: Poland
- Voivodeship: Greater Poland
- County: Kalisz
- Gmina: Żelazków
- Time zone: UTC+1 (CET)
  - Summer (DST): UTC+2 (CEST)
- Postal code: 62-817
- Vehicle registration: PKL

Skarszew [ˈskarʂɛf] is a village in the administrative district of Gmina Żelazków, within Kalisz County, Greater Poland Voivodeship, in central Poland.

== History ==
Following the German-Soviet invasion of Poland, which started World War II in September 1939, the village was occupied by Germany until 1945. On 16 and 19 January 1945, the Gestapo carried out a massacre of some 70 Polish resistance members, including women, in the village.
