= Tower of David Period =

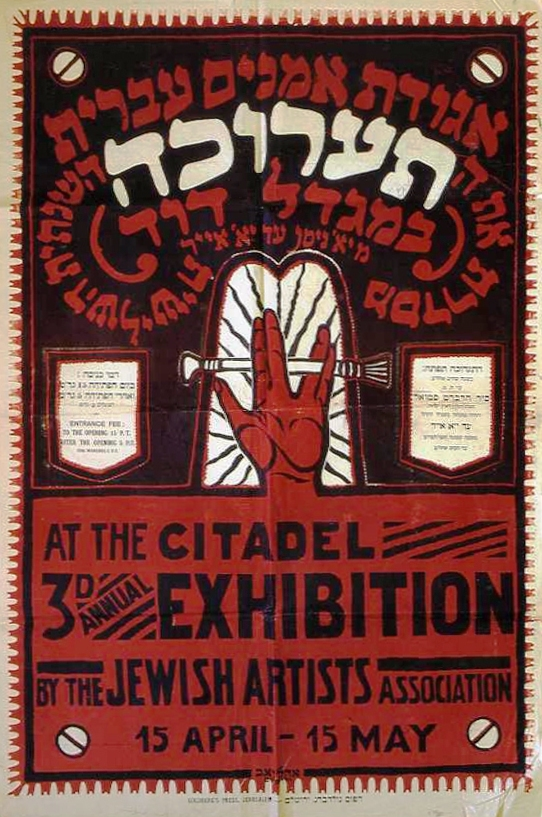
Tower of David exhibition poster 1924

The “Tower of David Period” is a nickname which describes Israeli art during the 1920s, specifically from Jerusalem's Bezalel perspective. The nickname was coined as a result of the exhibition that took place in the Tower of David, Jerusalem during that period. In the 1920s the artistic center of the region shifted from Jerusalem to Tel Aviv as modernist art of the School of Paris was introduced in Tel Aviv. Prominent events include the Tower of David exhibitions in the early 1920s, the Ohel theatre "modern artists" exhibition and the opening of the Histadrut art studio in Tel Aviv.

Instead of one artistic direction, this period was characterized by artistic works of conflicting styles, reflecting the worldview of the artists with regard to the social, political, and artistic reality within the Land of Israel and outside of it. Alongside the art created at “Bezalel”, which was characterized by decorative motifs and the influence of ars nova, the young Land-of-Israel artists produced works of art that reflected a variety of modernist influences.

== Background: The Land of Israel at the Beginning of the 20th Century ==
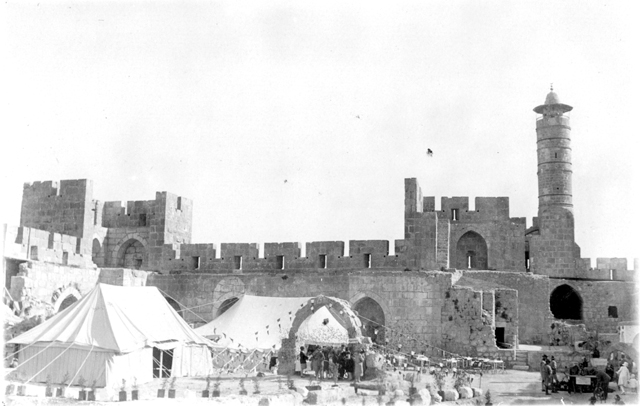
Tower of David in late 1920s

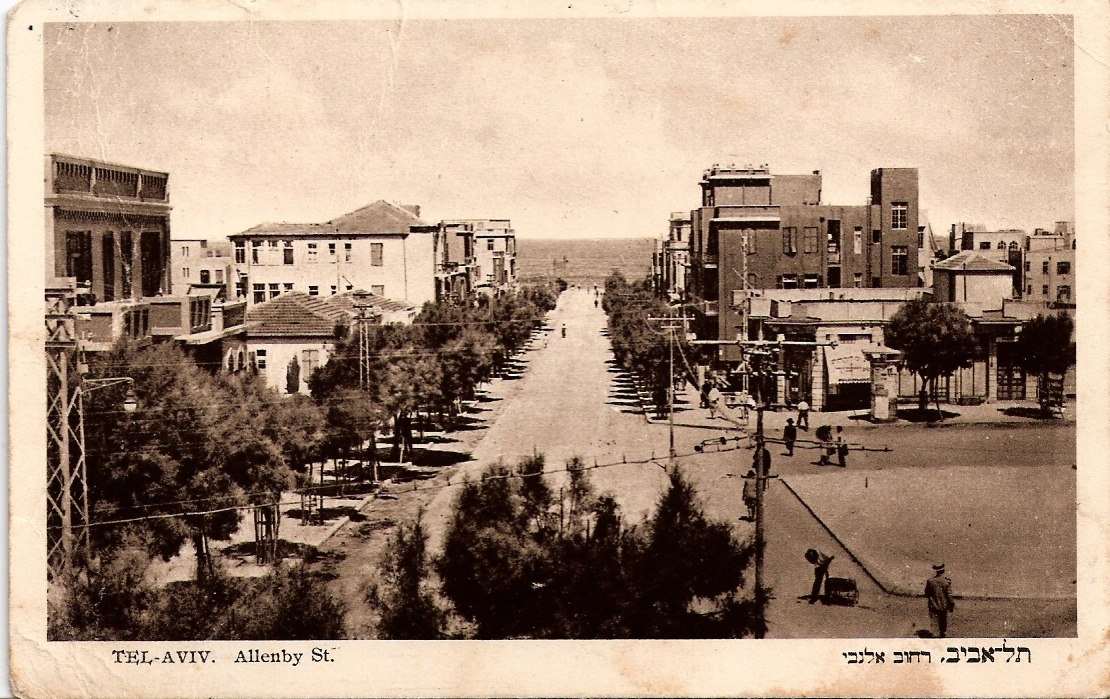
Tel Aviv in the 1920s

The variety of expressions and styles in the Land of Israel in the "Tower of David Period" reflects the historic and decisive division in the history of the Jewish people which preceded this period and continued through the days of the Yishuv, the body of Jewish residents in Palestine, before the establishment of the State of Israel, under the British Mandate.

The Yishuv community had been caught up in an accelerated process of change since the First Aliyah in 1881. The aspiration of the elite groups of new immigrants was not just to settle the Holy Land and to implement an emotional and spiritual awakening there, like most of their predecessors from the “Old Yishuv”, but also to fashion it in their own image and identity; this included, according to their own consciousness, both old and traditional elements and new and revolutionary elements, intertwined in a unique ideological treatise.

From the beginning of the 20th century, people of the Second Aliyah worked to change the status and situation of the Jewish community in the Land of Israel. The decisive compensation for their efforts came with the outbreak of World War I in 1914, and the events that followed in its wake: in 1917 the Russian Revolution took place and the Bolsheviks seized the government; the Ottoman and the Austro-Hungarian Empires dissolved into individual nations; and even the victorious Colonial powers, headed by Britain and France, began in effect a process of convergence. After the signing of the peace agreements, and as a result of them, a new world order prevailed; and in the Land of Israel, the British Mandate government slowly took root, beginning with the Balfour Declaration and the entry of the army into the Land of Israel, effecting a gradual occupation in 1918, the beginning of the military government, and later the civil government in 1920, and ending in the publication of the first “White Book” in 1922. The British in fact expressed support for the Zionist leadership, when they allowed delegations of the Zionist Commission and Hadassah to come to the Land of Israel and found the basis for declaring future Jewish sovereignty there; on the other hand they hampered aliyah to the Land of Israel and disbanded the Jewish Legion, which they had recruited during World War I, and in whom they had instilled with grand Zionist hopes.

A mixture of voices could be heard in the years after World War I in the various Jewish communities, particularly in the battle among the militant members of the Zionist Movement. Advocates of religiosity and traditionalism, nationalism and modernism, liberalism and Communism all made use of the movement. All these streams found a place in the small Yishuv society in the 1920s, and the different utterances and artist directions were combined in them and influenced by them.

The people of the Third Aliyah, from 1918 to 1923, were imbued with a wide-ranging revolutionary spirit, and they were engaged in a constant interchange with the Yishuv environment. However their influence was also a result of their numbers (by the end of the war the Yishuv numbered 56,000 people, and an estimate of the number of the many new Jewish immigrants, balancing out those who left, stood at 35,000) and in addition, to a large extent, because of the broad spectrum of new ideas they brought with them to the Land of Israel. Most of the new immigrants were from Eastern Europe, young, and with a belief in Zionism in all its varieties. Many of them, particularly the young and inventive among them, underwent a redesign of how they perceived their new Jewish and Hebrew world during the 1920s, while they were involved in Zionist labor like building roads and erecting buildings, and were undergoing the considerable suffering brought about by poverty, hunger, and the constant illnesses resulting from them. At the same time they were structuring their own personal identity, they also influenced the long-time residents of the Land of Israel who had preceded them: people who had come on the First and Second Aliyah and were members of the “Old Yishuv”.

== The Tower of David Exhibition: “The First Culture War” in Israeli Art” ==
The opening of exhibitions in the Tower of David in April 1921, expressed the aspirations toward founding a center for art in the Land of Israel. In spite of the fact that the exhibitions were supposed to include a representation of all the art being created in the Land of Israel, in reality the art of the non-Jewish, Muslim Arab and Christian residents were presented primarily in a historical-archaeological framework. The Jewish artists, on the other hand, sought to present art that drew its inspiration not just from the Jewish historical past, but also from the movement of art and handicrafts that grew out of European Modernism. This was most noticeable among the artists of “The Jewish Artists Association”, who attempted to develop a “Jewish ethic”. This group, most of whom were students of “Bezalel”, organized exhibitions in the Tower of David. A number of exhibitions were organized, both in the Tower of David and outside of it, and most of the works exhibited in these exhibitions were influenced by the Post-Impressionists and the Expressionists.

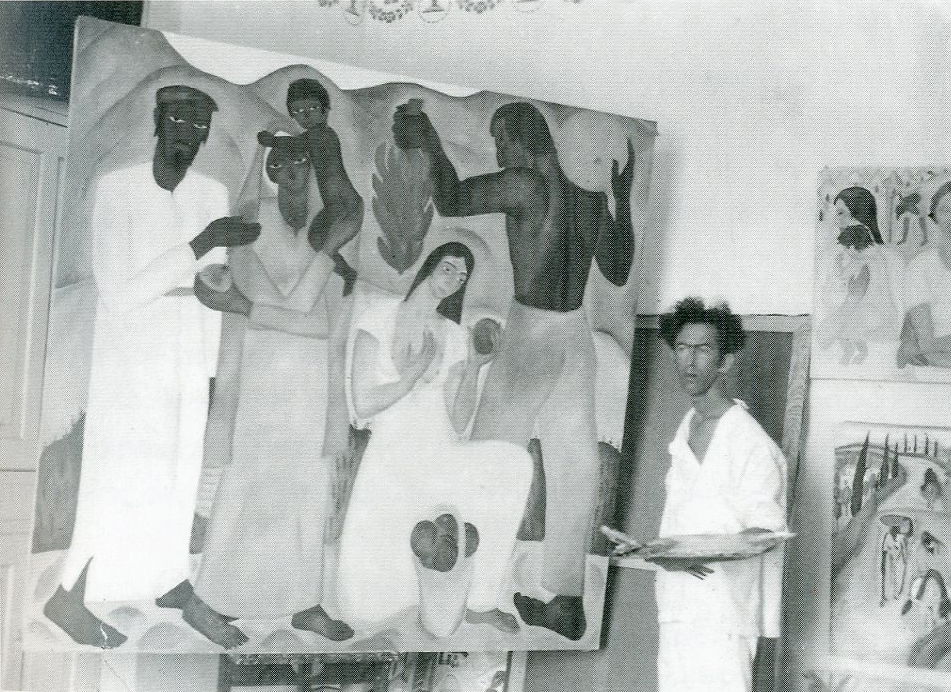
Reuven Rubin paints "Fruit of the Land" (central panel from the triptych "First Fruits"), 1923)

One of the most important exhibitions was that of the works by Reuven Rubin, who mounted an exhibition in the Tower in 1924. Rubin exhibited new works that showed the transition from the influence of the Christian tradition to paintings brimming with the symbolism of the Land of Israel. Among the works that drew attention was the triptych “First Fruits” (1924), which received enthusiastic reviews by critics from various fields of culture such as Hayyim Nahman Bialik, Samuel (Schmuel) Hugo Bergman, etc. However the perception of Modernist painting that Rubin presented was not shared by all of the population. His album of woodcuts, “The Godseekers (1923)”, which he sent to the High Commissioner, was rejected because the High Commissioner did not “have any liking for that population of art objects”. Views like those held by Rubin kept spreading among the young artists during the first half of the decade. At the same time "Bezalel" art continued to honor the values of Classicism, Jugendstil (Art Nouveau), and eastern European Realism. The works of the “Bezalel” artists existed primarily within the space of applied arts, and they were characterized by the introduction of noncanonical branches of art – such as decoration and design – into high art in order to create a style".

But first and foremost the young artists began to be aware of the growing gap between “Bezalel” and the international art world. One attempt to reject totally the world of Modernism can be seen in Boris Schatz’s closure of the Bezalel library because he was afraid the students would be negatively influenced by it. In a critical article published in 1928, Agan wrote that as opposed to the people of “Bezalel”, Modernist artists “draw the land of Israel with love and a desire to understand and grasp its colors and lines in accordance with the dominant trends in the modern art world”.

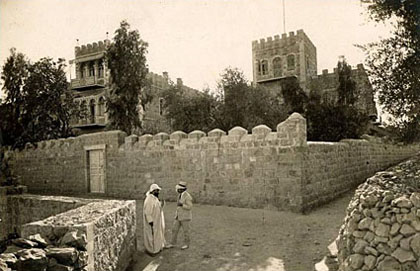
The Bezalel Buildings, Jerusalem, 1909

By the end of the decade the principles on which Bezalel based its work had become irrelevant, because they were no longer suitable to the political and ideological conditions of Eretz Israel. Besides the criticism of the varying quality of the results of the “Bezalel” workshops, the strengthening of left-wing elements in the Yishuv, increased the criticism of the use of national and religious symbols as the virtually exclusive expression of Jewish nationality. In 1929, the school closed after the Zionist organizations refused to support its activities any longer.

Yigal Zalmona presented the confrontation between the “Bezalel” people and the “rebel” artists as a confrontation between the “immigrant” point of view and the “native” point of view. The “old-timer” generation of “Bezalel” insisted on creating a national art, which focused on the symbols of its Judeo-European past. In this way the artists expressed their wish to be integrated into the world of European art. The “Bezalel” artists enjoyed the support of the European Jewish middle classes, and many of the orders for the art coming out of its workshops came from the Conservative and Reform Jews of the United States. The generation of modern students, on the other hand, saw the creation of a local Jewish culture as a central need, a point of view which coincided with spirit of Israel's Labor Movement. Many of them were influenced by the European vanguard, to whom they had been exposed in various frameworks, particularly in France. These artists, Tsalmona contended, wanted to create the reality of the Land of Israel of their time within the framework of the creative activity this vanguard.

== From Jerusalem to Tel Aviv – The Development of the Center of Art of the Land of Israel ==
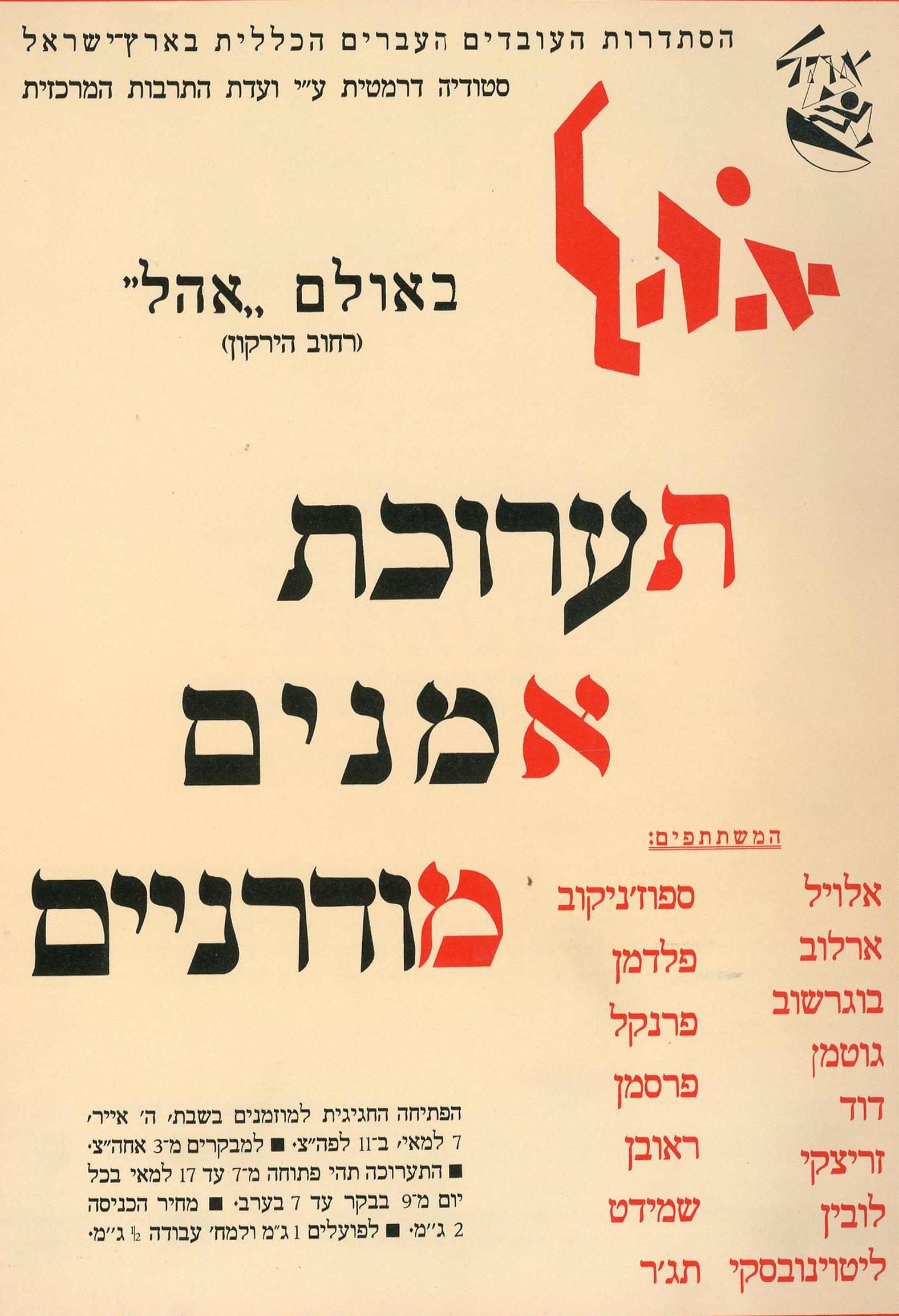
"Modern Artists Exhibition" in Ohel theatre, Tel Aviv. The first abstract artwork in Israel was presented by Yitzhak Frenkel in the exhibition.

The founding of “Bezalel” in Jerusalem in 1906 created a center of art and culture in Jerusalem the likes of which had never before been seen in the Land of Israel. The “Bezalel” people hoped to continue to develop the school as an artistic and ideological center for the country's inhabitants, and even for the Jewish inhabitants of the Diaspora. This was symbolized above all by the opening of the Bezalel National Museum in 1925, as a museum intended to be open permanently to the public. In these years the art of young artists from the Land of Israel was eliminated entirely from its exhibitions, which concentrated entirely on historical artistic evidence of the nationalist message appropriate to the “Bezalel” dialogue Boris Schatz was promoting. By the middle of the 1920s, Bezalel's status in the eyes of the public had seriously deteriorated. A witness to this can be seen in the 1927 letter of Mordechai Narkis to Boris Schatz, in which he reports that Land of Israeli newspapers have eradicated the name of the Bezalel school from their articles.

Parallel to Bezalel, at the beginning of the 1920s a group of independent artists who sought to cut all ties with the old establishment began to be active in Jerusalem. The establishment of the “Association of Jewish Artists” symbolized this more than any other phenomenon. In addition to the exhibits organized by the Association, private exhibitions were organized in various places in the city, such as “Menorah” (Joseph Zaritsky), Hotel Amdursky (Abraham Neumann), the Lamel School (Batya Leschinsky, Ariel Allweil), etc.

In contrast to Jerusalem, the rapid development of the city of Tel Aviv during this decade, especially during the years of the Fourth Aliyah (1924-1931), allowed the rise of a community of artists with a modernist orientation, far removed from the historical baggage of the Holy City. This group quickly rejected the centrality of Jerusalem as the center of art. According to Yona Fischer, the exhibit of modern paintings mounted in the School for Boys in Jerusalem in 1926 marked the end of the competition between these two centers.

One of the first signs of artistic activity in Tel Aviv was the opening of a school of painting and architecture in 1923 in the home of Joseph Berlin on Gruzenberg Street. During this decade most of the major artists moved to Tel Aviv, especially those who returned from studying art in France and other places in Europe. Nevertheless, the “Bezalel” approach remained popular in architecture and architectural decoration. This was reflected in the adaptation of the “eclectic style,” in which many of the buildings in Tel Aviv of that period were designed. In most of them porcelain tiles were used, glazed in the Bezalel style, and reflecting the themes and the ideology and the decorative approach of that Jerusalem institution.

One of the major donors to the visual arts in Tel Aviv was Yaakov Pereman, who was the entrepreneur behind the founding of the artists’ cooperative “Ha-Tomer”. In 1920 Pereman opened “The First Art Exhibition in the Land of Israel”, at which various works were exhibited, including those of the artists of the cooperative. In 1921-1922 Pereman founded and managed Tel Aviv's first art gallery, called “The Permanent Art Exhibition in the Land of Israel” in the exhibition hall in Neve Sha’anan. In this gallery many modernistic works, which Pereman brought from Eastern Europe, were exhibited, along with modernistic works by Land of Israel artists and works by artists from the “Bezalel” school as well. According to Batia Donner, “Pereman’s gallery activity was both an augmentation of and an alternative to the ‘Bezalel’ activity".

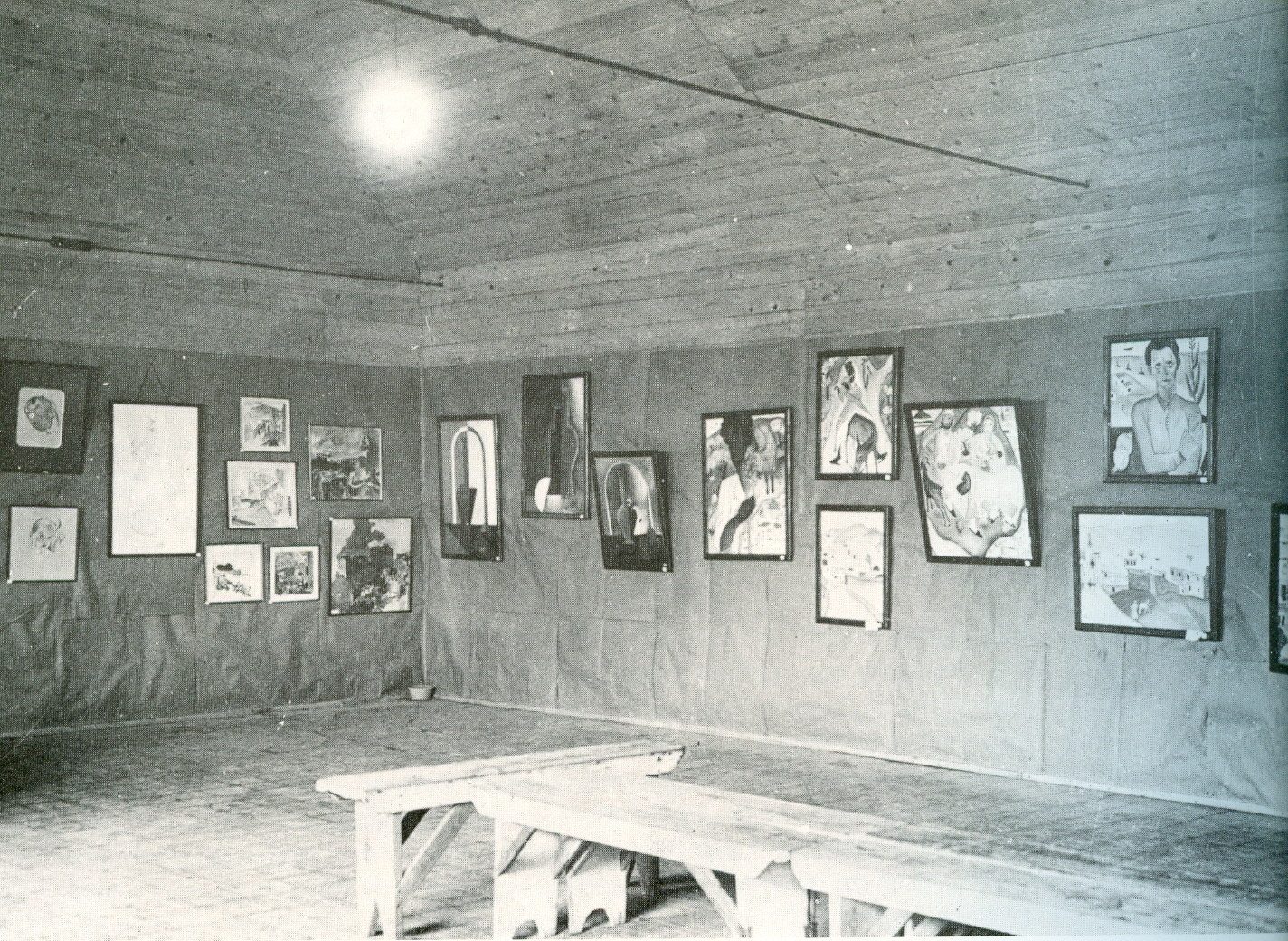
Exhibition of "Modern Artists" in the Ohel Theatre in Tel Aviv

On January 14, 1926, an exhibition entitled “Exhibition of Modern Artists” opened in a shed of the “Ha-Ohel” (The Tent) Theater. The poet Avraham Shlonsky gave a speech at the opening of the exhibition in which he suggested that the opening was a seminal event in the evolution of Jewish culture: “I recommend a substitute for God: the exhibition that is taking place in ‘Ha-Ohel’. A new synagogue needs to be found; that is, in place of God, we'll be standing there. Let the poet be found in the sphere of the painter, and the painter in the sphere of the musician. And ‘Ha-Ohel’ can serve as a substitute for God in the synagogue of art.” The first abstract artwork in Israel was presented by Yitzhak Frenkel in the exhibition. Frenkel also opened the Histadrut Art Studio, where he taught modernist techniques and art to his students, bringing the influence of the School of Paris to the country and encouraging his students to train in Paris. This exhibition, and two additional exhibitions held in “Ha-Ohel” before 1928, was perceived by Israeli art critics as the event that established the hegemony of Tel Aviv in the country's cultural life.

At the end of 1929, an exhibition of art by the group known as “Egged” (The Amalgamation), which took place in an apartment on Allenby Street in Tel Aviv, and which exhibited works by artists such as Sionah Tagger, Chana Orloff, Reuven Rubin, and others. Another exhibition held in Tel Aviv during this period under the name “Massad” (The Base") exhibited younger artists, including Aaron Priver, Menahem Shemi, Israel Paldi, Avigdor Stematsky, etc.

== Modernism in the Land of Israel During the 1920s ==
During the 1920s many of the young artists in the Land of Israel were exposed to modern art. Only a small minority of the artists immigrated to the Land of Israel from Eastern Europe with a previous exposure to European avant-garde art. Others went for a limited period to study in Europe, primarily in France, which was considered the center of art at the time, but also in Germany and other places.

The various modernist influences included postmodernist influences with regard to color and the way it is applied to the canvas, along with the moderating influences of Cubism and Expressionism, as well as a tendency to Primitivism. In contrast to the European artists, only a tiny minority of the artists in the Land of Israel leaned toward the avant-garde and the abstract in their works. The general mood demanded that they express the realistic experience of life in the Land of Israel, combining East and West in their work.

Among the outstanding artists of the period was the sculptor Abraham Melnikov. Melnikov suggested a different lexicon of forms, taken from ancient Eastern art instead of the art forms imported from Europe, and in accordance with the reigning philosophy in Bezalel during the time of Schatz and Lilien. “For generations”, Melnikoff wrote, “the Jews have been cut off from figurative art, and there are many reasons for this, but the main reason is that the foundations of European art are Greco-Roman […] and whenever Athens was the Only source of European art, the Jews instinctively watched from the side”.

"Land of Israel School", or "The Land of Israel Style," was established by a group of artists who inserted into their works symbols of the reality of the Land of Israel, which could also be interpreted as mystical symbols. In their works we see depictions of the Land of Israel wilderness, full of desert foliage and images drawn from Eastern exoticism. Many of the depictions are of Arab or Middle Eastern figures, which are shown to have a direct connection with Land of Israel nature or with the Land of Israel of the Bible.

In works such as "Woman Carrying a Sheaf" (1926) and "Resting at Noon" (1926) by Nachum Gutman, Middle Eastern figures working at nature-related activities are depicted. The style of the painting emphasizes their monumentality and sensuality. A similar style can be seen in the work of Israel Paldi, "Arab Sailors" (1928), which depicts a group of sailors in a fishing boat heroically fighting the waves. The composition of the painting, which reduces the view to the boat, also emphasizes the monumentality of the figures. Pinchas Litvinovsky's painting "Arab with Flower" (1926) combines a style that is modernist in the structure of its composition and its flat spaces, and romantic in its depiction of the Middle East and the Middle Eastern. In the works of Reuven Rubin we see, alongside the Middle Eastern figures, depictions of the way of life of the Jews of the Land of Israel as well. In his paintings such as "Sophie" (1924) or "Dancers of Meron" (1926), then tendency to flatness and decorativeness is very evident. In these works Rubin identifies Land of Israel Jewishness with Middle Eastern rootedness, as manifested by a large number of Yemenite or Arab figures, or by images of the Land of Israel landscape or foliage.

Even in the 1920s this type of art was the object of criticism. Uri Zvi Greenberg, for example, rejected the symbolic depiction which could be seen in the works of many artists of the time. In Greenberg's view, these artists were simply providing illustrations for the literary subject – the exotic Middle Easterner – for whom the artist "dragged the Arab from the market and his donkey by the ear to the canvas". The artist Chaim Gliksberg in 1923 also described the misuse of this motif by the artists: "Our paintings shocked the world, covered huge canvases, were illustrations painted in the decorative style without any attempt at solving artistic problems, since the main thing was the subject and the content: the external depiction of the Land of Israel. The canvas and the paint served only as the means to all this: it's no wonder that they considered everyone who put a pioneer, a camel, a donkey, or an Arab village on canvas, as an Israeli artist".

One of the artists who rejected the symbolic representation of the Land of Israel was Joseph Zaritsky. His works during this period included a large number of watercolor landscapes in light colors. His artistic work gradually became more free in its style. In works such as “Jerusalem Habashim Gate” (1923), you can still see a desire for a meticulous description of nature, but his later works show an expressive tendency in the creation of their composition; examples of this can be seen in the painting “Haifa, The Technion” (1924), or in the work “Jerusalem, Nahalat Shiva” (1924), in which Zaritsky uses trees as an expressive device for dividing the format into distinct areas. The use of lines as a means of expression stands out also in his landscapes depicting the houses of Jerusalem or Safed of that era.

Among the group of artists who were influenced by French Modernism we can see a combination of the influences of Cubism and realism. For example, in Sionah Tagger's painting, “The Train Passing Through Neve Tzedek” (1928), the tendency to geometric description stands out in monochromatic painted surfaces which combine with a realistic depiction of the urbanity of the developing city of Tel Aviv. In the works of Chana Orloff and Arieh Lubin, perhaps more than in any other artists of the period, we can see the influence of synthetic Cubism and of the tendency toward the use of geometric forms.

== See also ==
- Bezalel Pavilion at Jaffa Gate (1912-1918), shop and showroom of the Bezalel School of Arts somewhat resembling the Citadel
- Visual arts in Israel
- Art in Tel Aviv
