= Yitzhak Katz =

Yitzhak Katz יצחק כץ
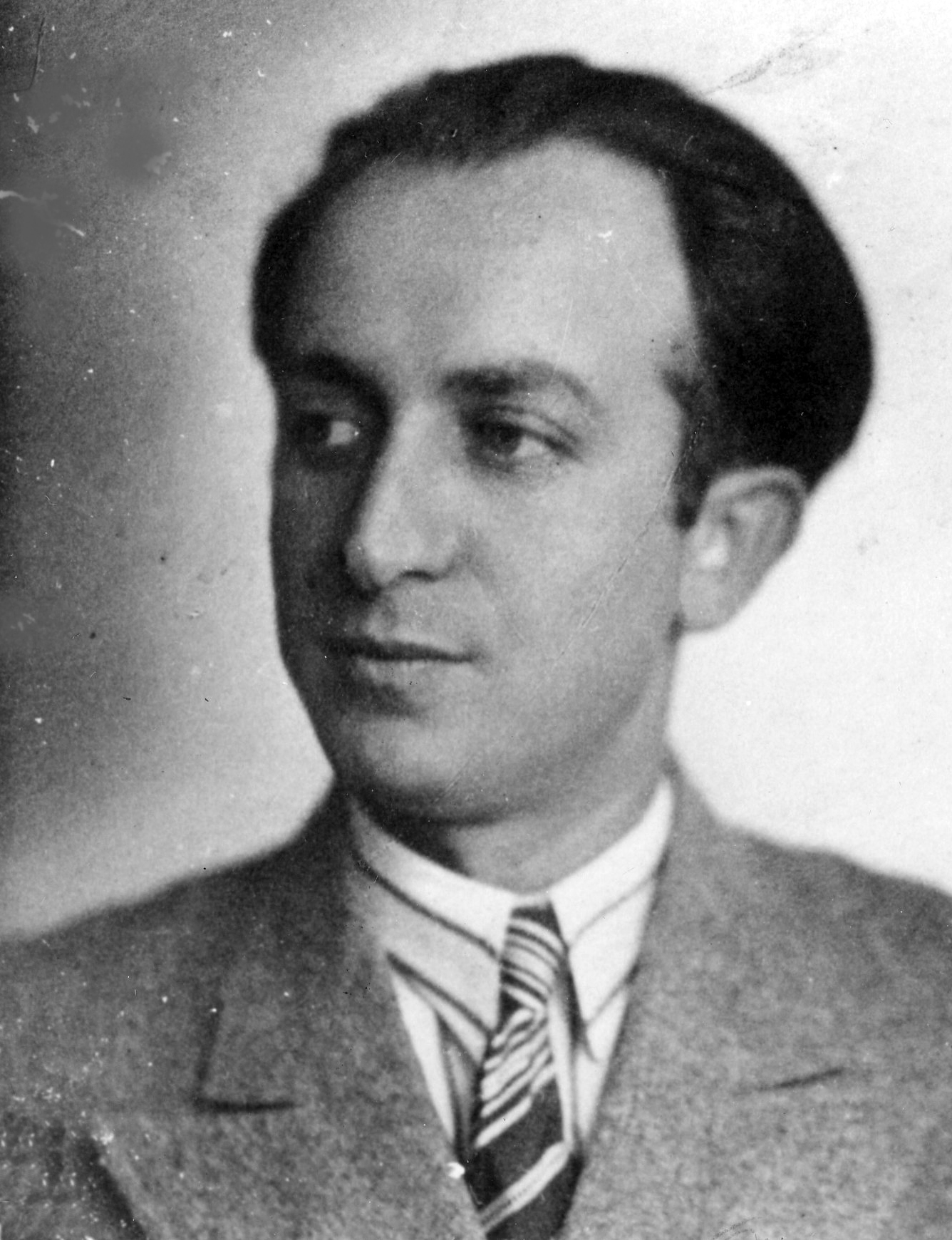
- Isaac Katz, 1928
- Born: 19 May 1901; Mykolaiv
- Died: 1991 (aged 89–90)
- Movement: Israeli art

Yitzhak Katz (Hebrew: יצחק כץ; 19 May 1901 – 1991) was an Israeli civil servant and art critic active in all spheres of Israeli arts and culture.

== Biography ==
Yitzhak Katz was born 19 May 1901 in Mykolaiv in the southwest Russia Empire (today Ukraine) to a religious Jewish family. His father, Abraham Katz, was an ordained rabbi. His mother was Reisel Kosowski. In 1906, Katz moved to Alexandria, Egypt, where his father opened a sewing shop and founded the Yiddish Theater Association. In 1912 the family moved to Cairo, but Yitzhak remained in Alexandria with his married sister. He studied at a high school run by Baron de Menashe Elijah Antebi (brother of Albert Antebi). Another famous student in school was Aaron Rosenfeld, who later became a pioneer of shipping in the Land of Israel. In the evenings, Katz studied painting.

After graduation, he moved to Cairo and earned a living writing plays for the Green Theater. Katz planned to study literature and art history in Paris, but in December 1919 he met Batsheva Charlap from Rehovot, daughter of Ephraim Zvi Charlap. When she returned to Palestine in the spring of 1920, he followed her. Katz settled in Jerusalem, where he worked as a government clerk. A few months later, he married Batsheva and began working for the Palestine Express travel agency. He developed ties at this time with the owner of Tarbut publishing house, Joshua Chachik, and other local intellectuals and artists, among them the painter Reuven Rubin.

At the end of 1923, he moved with his wife, daughter and sister-in-law to Tel Aviv. They lived on Ahad Ha'am Street, and the house became a meeting place for the Tel–Aviv bohemia of the 1920s and 1930s.

In 1924, Katz left his job at the travel agency. In April 1925, he became secretary of the Regional Chamber of Jaffa (later the Tel Aviv Chamber of Commerce), a position he filled until 1952. In 1928, Meir Dizengoff appointed Katz honorary Consul of Belgium. He served in this capacity until 1936.

Katz died in 1991.

== Art criticism ==
Alongside his work in the public sector, Katz published reviews and art criticism in journals and Hebrew newspapers. Yigal Zalmona described Katz as "a man of culture who fought the first war for modern art" in Israel. In 1925, in the publication "Theater and Art", Katz wrote that he sought to establish a new national art that would be "an antithesis to art of the exile which was based on biblical iconography" but would rather "find inspiration from the contemporary Eastern and Western cultures".

== Archive ==
When Katz died in 1991, his archive was transferred to the Information Center for Israeli Art in the Israel Museum, Jerusalem. The archive includes photographs, his writings and his correspondence with artists of his time including Siona Tagger, Israel Paldi, Arieh Lubin, Avigdor Hameiri, and others.

== See also ==
- Culture of Israel
- Visual arts in Israel
