= Joseph Zaritsky =

Israeli painter (1891–1985)

Joseph (Yossef) Zaritsky
- יוסף זריצקי
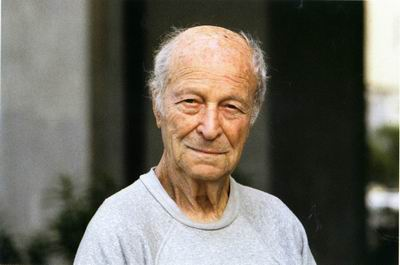
- Born: September 1, 1891; Russian Empire
- Died: November 30, 1985; Tel Aviv, Israel
- Known for: Painting
- Movement: Israeli art

Joseph (Yossef) Zaritsky (Hebrew: יוסף זריצקי; September 1, 1891 – November 30, 1985) was one of the early promoters of modern art in the Land of Israel both during the period of the Yishuv (the body of Jewish residents in the Land of Israel before the establishment of the State of Israel) and after the establishment of the State. Regarded as one of the most influential Israeli painters, Zaritsky is known for cofounding the "Ofakim Hadashim" group. In his works, he created a uniquely Israeli style of abstract art. For this work he was awarded the Israel Prize for painting in 1959.

== Biography ==
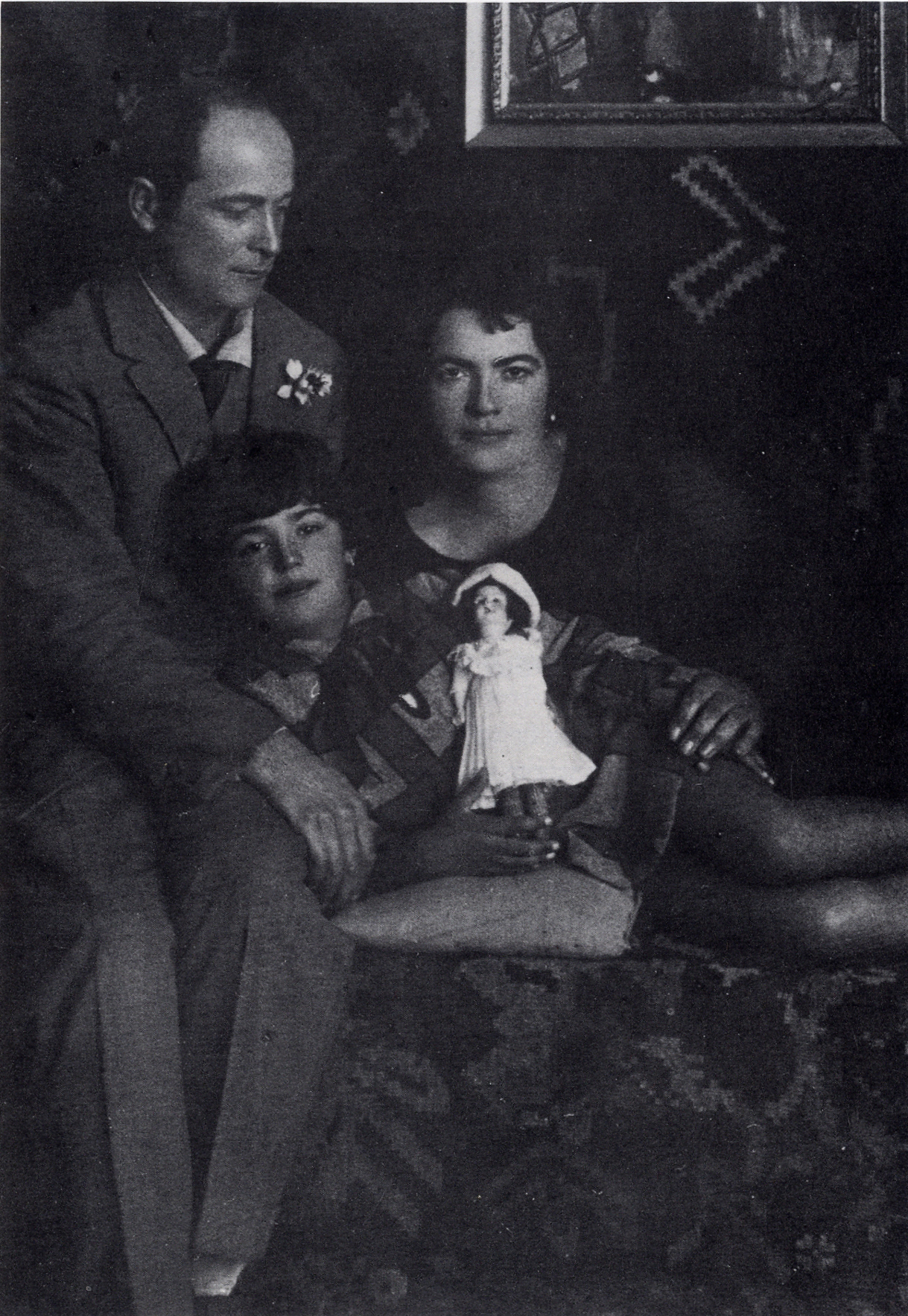
Joseph Zaritsky with his wife Sara and daughter, Jerusalem, 1923

=== Russia, 1891–1923 ===
Joseph Zaritsky was born in 1891 in Boryspil, in the Poltava Oblast (province), in the Southwestern portion of the Russian Empire (today the Kyiv Oblast of Ukraine), to a large, traditional Jewish family. His parents, Golda and Joseph Ben Ya'acov, were farmers with National-Zionist leanings. One of the main expressions of this was their devoting of two rooms in their home to the study of Hebrew and reading. When he was 7 or 8 Zaritsky was sent away from home for a long period of time (it's not known to where). From 1910 to 1914 he studied art at the Academy of Arts in the city of Kiev. Among the artists that influenced Zaritsky was the Russian Symbolist painter Mikhail Vrubel. In 1915, during World War I, Zaritsky was conscripted into the Russian Army, where he served until 1917. Zaritsky, in an interview, talked about his being sent to the front as an officer during the First World War, but then, when he got there, being sent back because the peace agreement between Russia and Germany had been signed. In 1918 he married Sarah (Sonia), a graduate of the Faculty of Dentistry in Kiev, and the daughter of Rabbi Israel Dov Zabin. A year later their daughter Etia was born.

Because of the pogrom of 1919, the family escaped to Kalarash, Bessarabia, leaving behind all his works and art up to that point. In Kalarash he stayed in his father-in-law's home, where he painted small-scale watercolors, of which only five have survived: three portraits of his wife and two rural landscapes. These small works are done in small dark colored dots, and they reflect the influence of Russian modernism.

In his painting "Artist’s Wife Looking out at the Street" (1920), Zaritsky divided the painting into two: the background, in which he describes the town, and the foreground, in which his figure sits. The angle of description of the figure – from behind – emphasizes this division. In spite of the division, Zaritsky cancelled the illusion of spaciousness by using identical materials and coloring for both parts. In his landscapes of this period as well, Zaritsky divided the format into a sort of mosaic on small canvases that blur the illusion of perspective.

=== Jerusalem, 1923–1925 ===
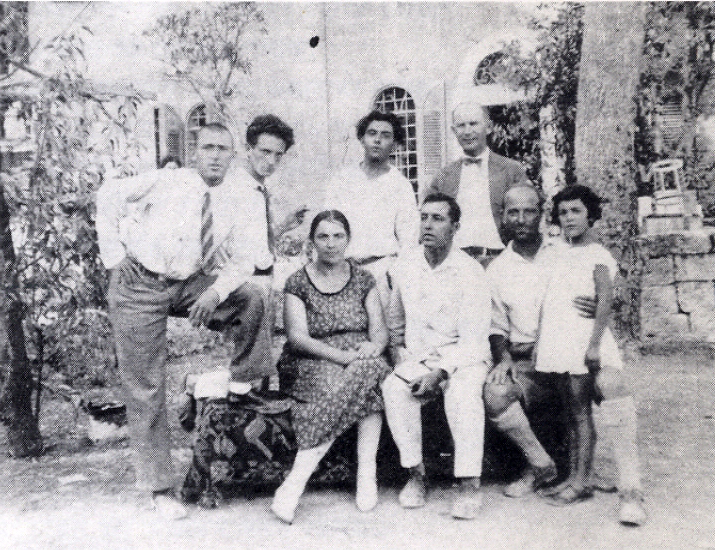
Jerusalem 1925: sitting (left to right): Ms. Sarah (Sonia) Zaritzky, Israel Paldi, Joseph Zaritzky and daughter Etia. Standing (left to right): Arieh Lubin, Joseph Pressmane, Chaim Gliksberg, Todros Geller.

In 1923 Zaritsky immigrated to the Land of Israel alone and settled in Jerusalem; a year later his family followed. In the city Zaritsky painted a number of watercolor landscapes in light colors. Gradually his artistic works became freer. In "Jerusalem: Abyssinian Gate” (1923), a precise rendering of nature is still apparent, but in later works there is a pronounced expressionistic tendency in the composition of his works. Examples of this can be seen in “Haifa, the Technion” (1924), and in the works called "Jerusalem: Nachalat Shiva" (1924), in which Zaritsky uses an expressionistic technique for dividing the format into separate spaces. The use of lines in his work as a means of expression can be seen also in his depictions of houses in Jerusalem and Safad from this period.

In 1924 Zaritsky mounted his first solo exhibition in the club "Menorah" in Jerusalem. Another exhibition was opened in the Technion in Haifa. The journalistic criticism emphasized the lyricism in his works, and the fact that "the forms [in his paintings] turn into dots of abstract color, the subject of which is an allegory of color and light, and not the plot of a story." In addition, Zaritsky and the sculptor Abraham Melnikov, were the initiators of the first of the exhibitions of Israeli artists in the Tower of David. Also, from 1927 he served as the Chairman of the Israel Painters and Sculptors Association.

=== Tel Aviv, 1925–1948 ===
In the middle of the 1920s Zaritsky moved to Tel Aviv and continued to paint the series of landscapes that he had started in Jerusalem. The landscapes and portraits of that he painted during these years show his effort to create an artistic language appropriate to description.

In 1927 Zaritsky left his family behind and went to Paris for a stay of several months. There he was exposed to the western modernist art that was flourishing in Paris at the beginning of the twentieth century. Later Zaritsky remarked on how impressed he was by the exhibits at the Guimet Museum of Asian Art.

In 1929 Zaritsky participated in the "Egged" group's exhibition, held in an apartment on Allenby Street in Tel Aviv, in which artists such as Sionah Tagger, Arieh Lubin, and Pinchas Litvinovsky, among others, also participated. The works of this group show the influence of late French post-modernism (primarily of the "School of Paris"), which was popular among the artists of the Land of Israel. In Zaritsky's works this was manifested in his tendency to paint broad surfaces of color and to use broad, free brushstrokes. In "Portrait of the Artist's Wife," an oil painting done in 1929, Zaritsky used the image of a bouquet of flowers in front of the main image. Broad, free brushstrokes blur the boundary between the foreground and the background of the painting.

His exhibition at the Bezalel National Museum in 1930 established him as a modernist and reflected a turn toward European art. Uri Zvi Greenberg said, after a visit to the exhibition, that Zaritsky's work encompasses a different kind of painting which does not reflect "the literality of illustrative art toward the literary subject," the exotic imagery of the Land of Israel, "which drags Arabs from the shuk and their donkeys, by the ears, to the olive press." The atmosphere in the painting Greenberg described as "the stillness of colors" and "the holding of one's breath." “Even the red curtain," Greenberg writes, "which in his paintings reminds us of the abstraction of Kandinsky, even this red is restrained, and its judgment as red becomes just a matter of a wintry sunset."

Between 1932 and 1933, Zaritsky opened an art "studia" adjoining the basement of the home where he lived on 18 Mapu Street. Among the artists who came to his studio were Yehiel Krize, Arie Aroch, etc. Nonetheless, the studio did not last long, and Zaritsky was destined to earn his living in the future, for the most part, from the real estate he owned.

A subject that appears in his work during these years is the motif of flowers, such as in the series of watercolors called "Flowers on the Windowsill," which he painted in Tel Aviv between 1937 and 1944, and in his works that were created after a visit to Beit Daniel (Daniel House) in Zichron Yaakov, from 1939 and during the 1940s. While in the early works of the series flowers serve as an element for focusing the viewer's observation on reality, in the later works the flowers become more of a form used to express feeling.

In 1935 Zaritsky moved to a new house that he built on the southeast corner of Ben Yehuda and Mapu Streets. In the large series of works he produced in the 1930s and 1940s, which depicted views of the city from his rooftop, Zaritsky turned his gaze away from the view of the beach which occupied his contemporaries, like Nahum Gutman, Reuven Rubin, etc., to views of the new, modern city spread out to his north and east. In his early works Zaritsky divided his works into areas that created the feeling of spaciousness. In some of the paintings the image of the painter working on views of the landscape even appears. His later works serve as a means of blurring and breaking up these areas. This blurring allows the blending of the landscape with what the painting is representing. Yona Fischer states that in Zaritsky's rooftop paintings there is an attempt at combining and unifying the light and the dark in his landscapes. Mordechai Omer also described Zaritsky's use of light in his paintings and suggests that in these paintings the light is not perceived as a tonal problem. In fact, Omer claims, Zaritsky left the objects in the paintings unnuanced.[12]

In 1941 he mounted a solo exhibition in the Habima building in honor of his 50th birthday. In 1942 Zaritsky won the Dizengoff Prize for Painting.

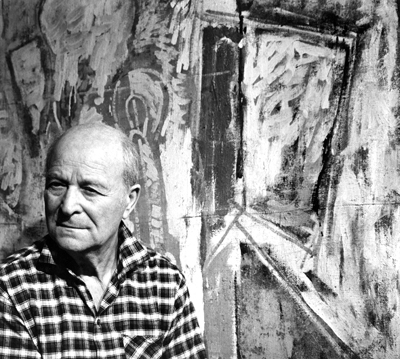
Zaritsky in Jerusalem

=== New Horizons, 1948–1963 ===
==== The Founding of "New Horizons" ====
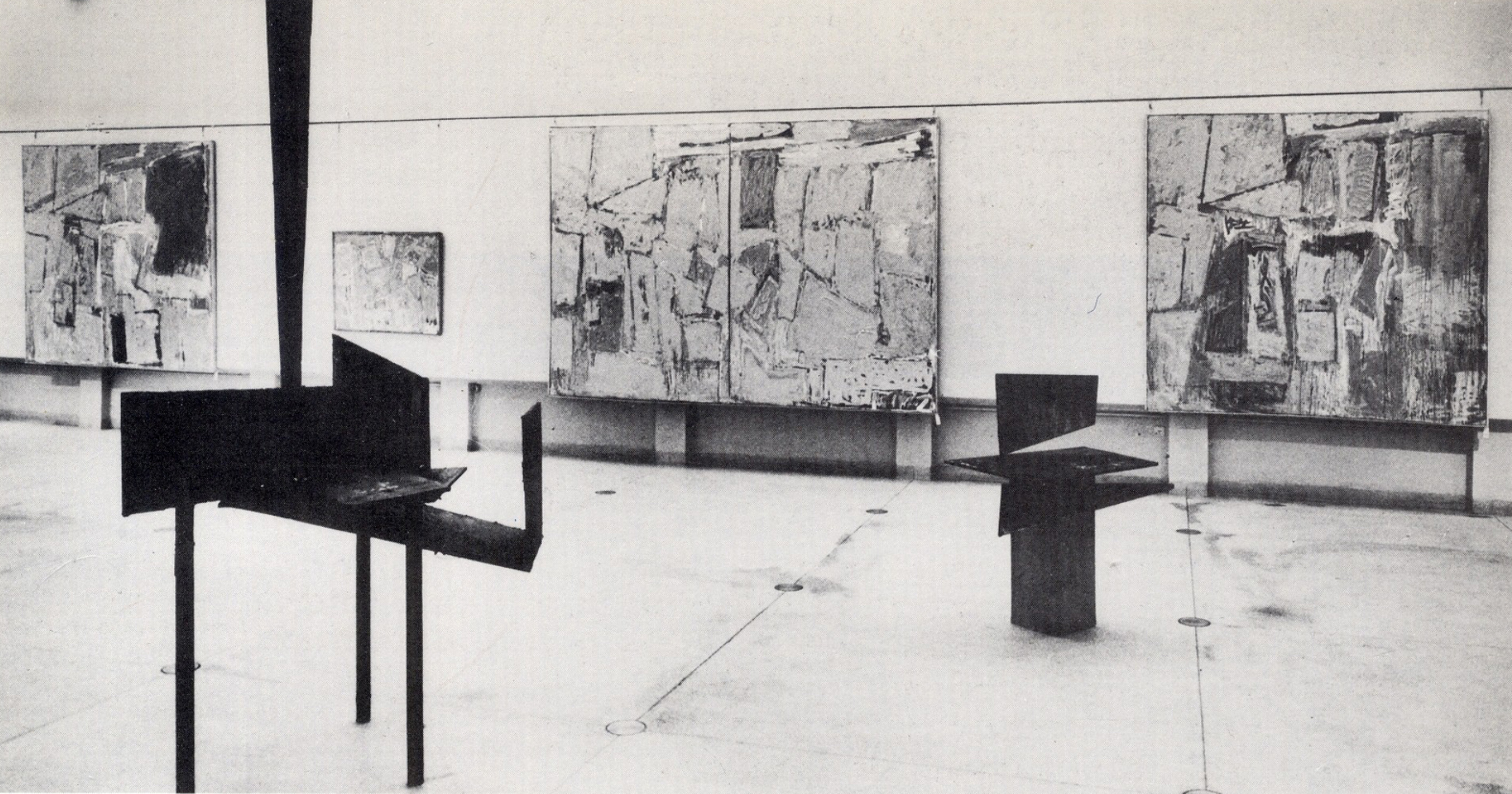
Paintings by Zaritsky and Itzhak Danziger at the 9th "Ofakim Hadashim" exhibition, Tel Aviv Museum of Art, April 1959

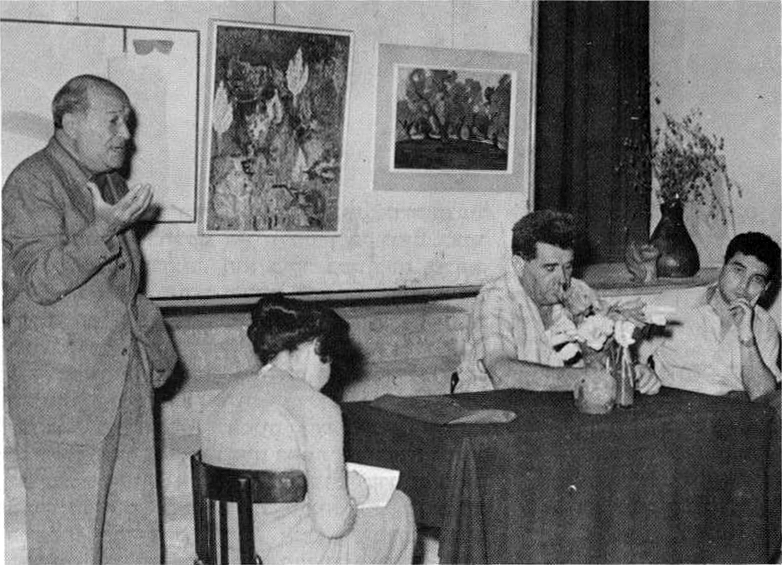
Zaritsky (left) at the "Histadrut Prize" Ceremony, 1961

The motive behind the founding of an alternative to the general art association came into being in 1948, with an invitation to mount an exhibition of Israeli artists at the Italian pavilion of the Venice Biennale. Zaritsky, who was chairman of the association at the time, decided on his own to create a list of artists who would participate because he was afraid that, left to the general membership, the list would include mediocre artists. This created a scandal at the association"s general meeting, which took place at the home of Chaim Gliksberg. At the meeting it was decided to suspend Zaritsky from the group. As a reaction to the condemnation, several artists, among them Moshe Castel, Yehezkel Streichman, and Yohanan Simon announced their immediate resignation from the association and their invitation to Zaritsky to form an independent association.

Around the original core, 15 artists gathered and boycotted the general exhibition of Israeli artists, and instead held the dedication of the new Artist's House in Tel Aviv. On July 2, 1948, the dissidents published their manifesto in the newspaper Haaretz, stating that the association must emphasize achievements in Jewish painting and not sink into mediocrity. On November 9, 1948, the new group mounted an exhibition of 18 member artists in the Tel Aviv Museum of Art, under the name "New Horizons." While artists such as Yohanan Simon, Moshe Castel, and Marcel Janco dealt with Zionist and Jewish symbolism, Zaritsky chose for the exhibition an abstract still life influenced by the cubist painter Georges Braque.

In the exhibition catalog Zaritsky emphasized the role of art in building the young nation in modernist terms: “We demand an art that exists in close proximity to the people […] and we are willing to explain to the public the paths and forms of the new art in order to inculcate into it these new values of truth, so that it will grasp them and march forward with us. In this way we will be able to develop the art of truth in our young country." While the art in the exhibition did not display aesthetic uniformity or a joint painting style, the exhibition was perceived as an attempt to put forward a change in the nature of local art and drew thousands who came to view the "sensationalist" modern art.

From the moment it was formed, “New Horizons” was perceived as a movement which aspired to have the strength of the establishment behind it. An example of this can be seen in the reactions to the general exhibition of the Israel Painters and Sculptors Association held in November 1952, in commemoration of 20 years since the found of the Tel Aviv Museum of Art, claiming that the group “conquered” the main exhibition hall.

==== “Otsma” ====
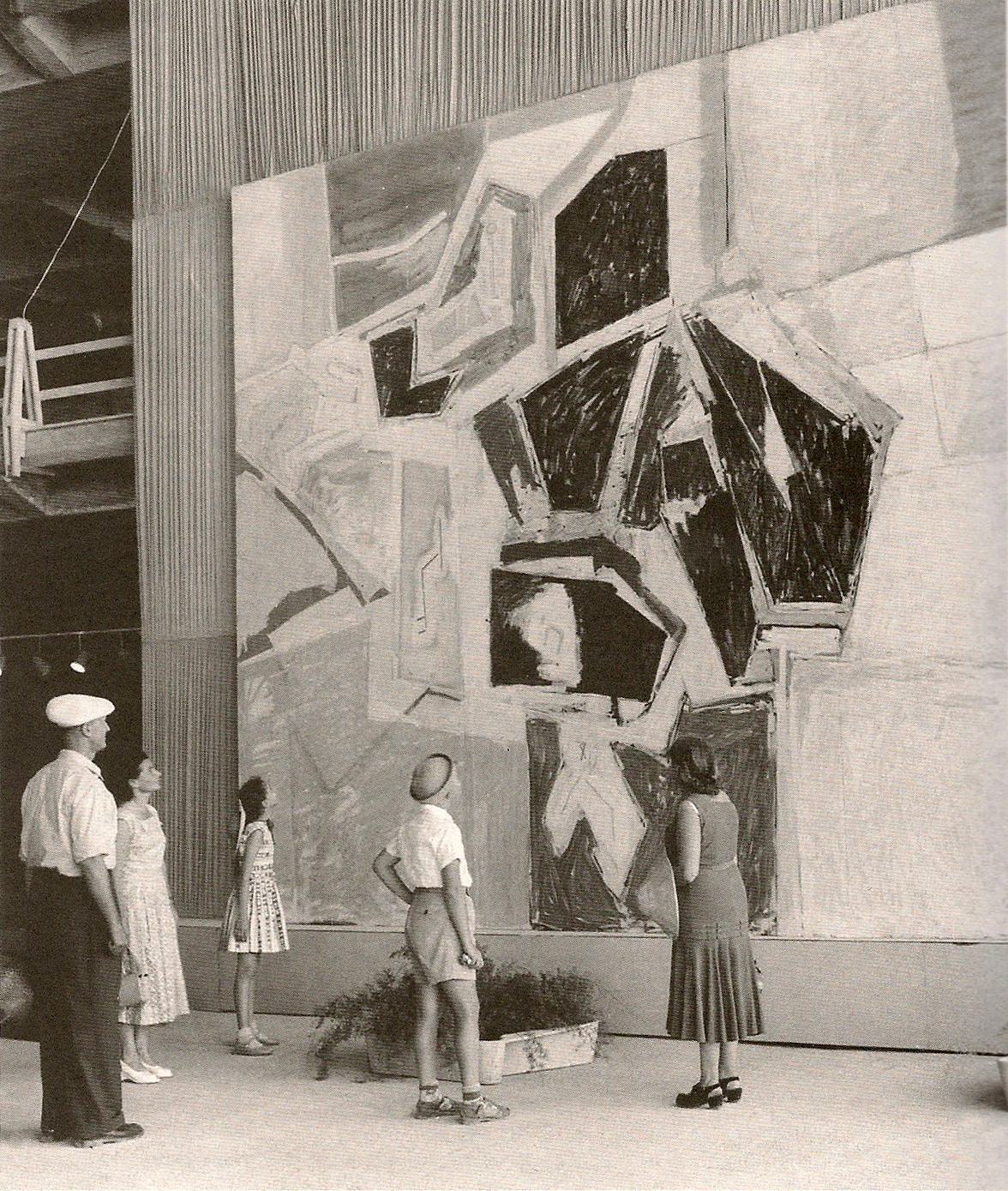
Might (1958) by Yosef Zaritsky at "the First Daecade Exhibition"' 1958

In 1957 the government of Israel decided to put on a large national display in honor of the tenth anniversary of the founding of the State of Israel. Within the framework of the preparations for the "Exhibition of the Decade," which opened on June 5, 1978, in Binyanei Hauma in Jerusalem, the government commissioned several works of monumental proportions from the members of "New Horizons." It was one of the first times that the abstract works of the members of this group were displayed in a non-museum environment. Among the outstanding works were a large steel sculpture by Yechiel Shemi, "Sculpture of the Decade" by Itzhak Danziger, a frieze by Jacob Wexler, etc. Another notable work was Zaritsky's painting "Otsma" (Power), which had been commissioned by Avraham Yaski, a designer in the "Department of Economic Achievements." This oil painting was based on a number of motifs that had been appearing throughout his works as a secondary thread since his "Yechiam" period.

On the eve of the opening of the exhibition, David Ben-Gurion made a tour of the exhibition, perusing the pavilions and displays there, including the Zaritsky's painting. As a result of Ben-Gurion's remark, which according to one version was – "So, this is modern art. Well, we can manage with modern art and we can manage without it" – Zaritsky's painting was moved from its central place in the Economics Division of the exhibition to another place in the exhibition. As a result of this decision a protest was raised by some of the journalists covering the exhibition, as well as by some of the public, against the intervention of the government in matters of art. It turned into one of the biggest scandals between the artist and the government that ever occurred in the history of visual arts in Israel. Yona Fischer wrote in LaMerhav, that "the insult to the veteran artist Zaritsky typifies the way in which the world 'culture' is understood in our country," but he acknowledged that the choice of an abstract artist like Zaritsky for an exhibition intended for the masses was a mistake. When the exhibition closed, because of the insult, Zaritsky destroyed the painting.

Another monumental work, carried out jointly by Zaritsky and Yitzhak Danziger, was commissioned by the architect Zeev Rechter for the front of the building. The two planned a long fiberglass relief with geometric motifs also taken from "Yechiam." In the end the work was never created, and in the place intended for it, a long concrete strip was installed.

=== Later years ===
In 1968 Zaritsky was the first recipient of the Sandberg Prize of Israeli Art From the Israel Museum, the money for which was donated by an American philanthropist. Among the committee members choosing the recipient were Sandberg and Yona Fischer. This prize was awarded to him for a large "painting" he produced in 1964, based on one of the works of Johannes Vermeer. In the many interviews he granted in honor of winning the prize, Zaritsky emphasized his worldview with regard to the independence of the meaning of a painting. "The viewer must not see more in the painting than what is there," Zaritsky explained. "He must not allow his imagination to run wild with regard to what he is looking at. What he sees is what there is. The painting is not a dream."[28]

From 1968 to 1970 Zaritsky worked on a figurative portrait of art collector Ayala Zacks-Abramov. For this unusual work, he drew several sketches and a number of preliminary drawings on canvas. The full portrait, carried out in shades of green, shows Zacks-Abramov in the corner of the canvas, with her hands on her knees. While her hands undergo abstraction, the image's face retains a clear, realistic character. A large part of the composition is taken up by a curtain which becomes the dominant form in the background.

The tonality of this painting has much in common with other works he painted between 1964 and 1974. In his "Green Touches" series, as well as in the paintings "Tel Aviv Windows" and "Red Stain," the growing distance in the composition and construction of his paintings from a description of nature as it is, toward a conversation with the abstract, is clearly evident.

In the 1980s Zaritsky would take up residence every summer in the studio he had received on Kibbutz Tzuba. At Tzuba he would paint watercolors, among them abstract nature paintings, from direct contemplation of nature. In the summer of 1983, Zaritsky painted a number of paintings in the studio in which he returned to the motif of the window, which he had used in the past. In addition, in the 1980s Zaritsky created a number of paintings, some of them monumental in size, constructed along the lines of painters like Goya, Picasso, Chagall, etc.

In 1980 one of Zaritsky's watercolors from 1924 was sold at a public auction in the Gordon Gallery for $79,000. However, in addition to economic success, in his last years Zaritsky received a number of public tributes as well. In 1979 he was interviewed on television for the first time on Gideon Ofrat's show "Taste and Smell." In 1981 the Israeli Postal Authority issued a stamp depicting Zaritsky's “Jerusalem: The View from Jaffa Gate” (1927). In 1981 Marc Scheps, Director of the Tel Aviv Museum of Art, named Zaritsky recipient of the Yakir Ha'ir (Esteemed of the city) award; on May 26, 1982, Zaritsky received the award from Shlomo Lahat, the Mayor of Tel Aviv. In January 1982 there was a festive screening of the film "Portrait of an Artist: Joseph Zaritsky” (1981; 32 min.), directed by Jachin Hirsch, under the auspices of the Ministry of Education and the Israel Film Service. In 1985 the Tel Aviv Museum Art hosted a retrospective exhibition of Zaritsky's art that included 340 of his works.

On March 26, 1985, Zaritsky's wife Sarah died. Zaritsky died a few months later, on November 30, in Assouta Medical Center, aged 96. After a ceremony at the Tel Aviv Museum of Art, he was buried at Kibbutz Tzova.

== Zaritsky's Works ==
During the second decade of the twentieth century, Zaritsky stood out because of his modern approach, in contrast to the "Tower of David Period" paintings with their Land of Israel style. His works differed from these paintings in that they lacked local symbols, such as local people, camels, or donkeys. These works were still influenced by Russian modernism. However his later work shows a gradual disengagement from the traditions of this painting style. Zaritsky developed a painting style known as "lyrical abstraction." In this kind of abstraction the images are created by the way the brush is pulled along the surface of the painting in order to produce compositions and paint stains that are for the most part square, whose disengagement from the realistic source and adaptation to the spirit of the painting, its impression as he calls it, increased with the passing of the years. Ran Shechori claimed that "lyrical abstraction" is an original Zaritsky formulation for the French "unformal" or the American "Action painting."

Gideon Ofrat claimed in his article "'New Horizons': About Sins" that Zaritsky's formulation of "lyric" painting created in Israeli art a tendency toward an emphasis on the surface, to a tribute to the lyrical line and stain. This tendency permeated the work of the "Want of Matter" artists, of minimalism, and of Israeli conceptual art. In addition, Efrat says that "the massive presence of new horizons prevented local development of all other sensitivities." Among others, it pushed aside Surrealism and Symbolism which had begun to appear in Israel during these years.

Zaritsky's watercolor paintings – a unique interpretation of Cézanne and of the Russian symbolist painting (Vrubel) – received recognition from the moment of his aliyah in 1923. Both as an active artist and as an art critic, from the beginning he was one of the artists identified with the avant-garde. The conflict between the orientalist dimension and the universalist dimension can be felt in his early works. Later he came to concentrate on the latter and even to fight for it. Zaritsky's watercolors, with all the admiration they received at the time, were viewed as significant milestones only retrospectively, after the painter had become the leader of "New Horizons." Joseph Zaritsky's still lifes and portraits from the end of the 1920s and the 1930s, show the influence of French intimiste painting and sometimes of Matisse. From the middle of the 1930s to the middle of the 1940s Zaritsky concentrated on describing one urban landscape – the view of Tel Aviv roofs from the window of his studio or from the roof of his house. This activity resulted in hundreds of watercolors in which the artist grappled with the principal problems of painting: the significance of translating reality to the ingredients of a painting. The window and the frame around the canvas that appear in most of these paintings are an allegory for this. Towards the end of this period a tendency toward flattening and abstraction can be seen in this series. The work becomes an object in itself, the objects of reality surrender to the internal laws of the painting and become motifs of the composition. These works of Zaritsky's are a milestone in the history of Israeli art both because of their high quality and because they represent an important stage in Zaritsky's movement toward abstraction. They represent the influence of French art in the 1930s. They also relate to the modernist, contemporary aspect of the modern architecture of Tel Aviv, and to painting for its own sake and not to a figurative theme. The level of sophistication and the depth with which he dealt with the principles of painting are milestones in themselves. These paintings represent the enormous interest the painters of the Land of Israel had in watercolor painting (both for economic and budgetary reasons, and in order to transmit the effects of light). Artists such as Pinchas Abramovich, Yehiel Krize, Arie Aroch, and Shimshon Holzman were all pupils of Zaritsky during those years. And in addition to them, he had a great influence on many other artists.

== Gallery ==
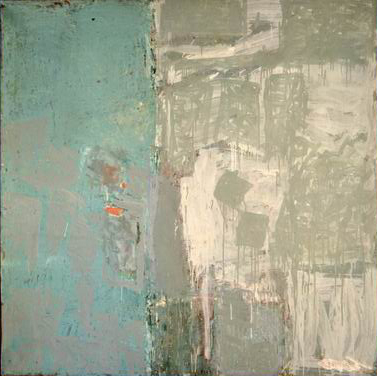
Untitled, 1964
Israel Museum Collection
B67.0789

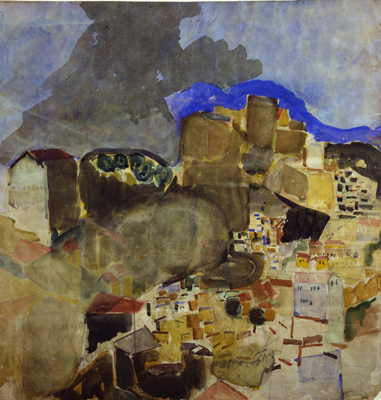
Safed, ca. 1924
Israel Museum Collection
B69.0313

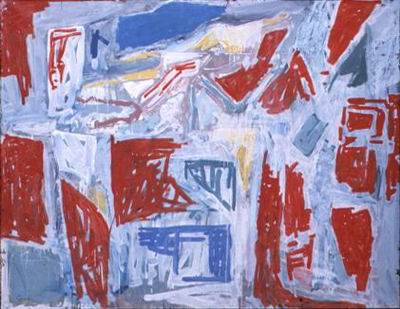
Paris, 1954
Israel Museum Collection
B87.0249

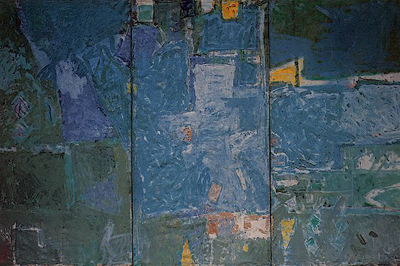
Painting, 1964
Israel Museum Collection
B67.0599

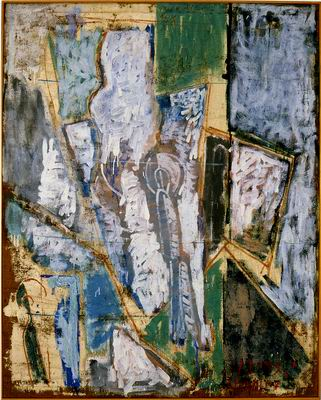
The Painter and the Model, 1949
Israel Museum Collection
B74.0036

== Education ==
- 1914 Art Academy, Kiev

== Teaching ==
- 1932–33 Opened studio in the cellar of his home in Rehov Mapu, Tel Aviv

== Awards and prizes ==
- 1942 Dizengoff Prize for painting
- 1959 Israel Prize, in painting.
- 1967 Sandberg Prize for Israeli Art, Israel Museum, Jerusalem
- 1982 Yakir Tel Aviv-Jaffa

== See also ==
- List of Israel Prize recipients
