= Ayala (surname) =

- Etymology: Ayala/Aiara
- Place of origin: Spain

Ayala (Basque: Aiara) is a toponymic surname, originally de Ayala (of Ayala), deriving from the town of Ayala/Aiara in the province of Álava, in the Basque Country, northern Spain.

It is linguistically unrelated to the Hebrew female given name Ayala, which is of Biblical origin.

== Arts and entertainment ==
- Alexis Ayala (born 1965), American-born Mexican actor
- Cristina Ayala (writer) (1856–1936), pen name of Cuban poet Maria Cristina Fragas
- Daniel Ayala Pérez (1906–1975), Mexican violinist, conductor, and composer
- Francisco Ayala (novelist) (1906–2009), novelist
- Isidro Más de Ayala (1899–1960), Uruguayan psychiatrist and author
- Joey Ayala (born 1956), Filipino musician
- Josefa de Ayala (c. 1630 – 1684), Spanish-born Portuguese painter
- Pedro Ayala (1911–1990), American accordionist
- Ramón Ayala (American musician) (born 1928), American accordion player
- Ramón Ayala (Argentine musician) (1927–2023), Argentine singer and poet
- Ramón Ayala Rodríguez (born 1976), Puerto Rican musician known as Daddy Yankee
- Thaila Ayala (born 1986), Brazilian actress and model
- Vanessa Ayala, Colombian-American artist
- Violeta Ayala (born 1978), filmmaker and writer
- Vita Ayala, Afro-Puerto Rican comics writer

== Politics ==
- Eligio Ayala (1879–1930), President of Paraguay 1923–1924
- Eusebio Ayala (1875–1942), President of Paraguay 1921–1923
- Inés Ayala (1957–2024), Spanish politician
- Jessica Ayala, American politician
- Joel Ayala Almeida (1946–2025), Mexican trade unionist and politician
- Mohamed Tahir Ayala (1951–2025), Sudanese politician
- Paulina Ayala (born 1962), Canadian politician
- Ruben Ayala (1922–2012), American politician; California state senator

== Sports ==
- Bobby Ayala (born 1969), Major League pitcher
- Celso Ayala (born 1970), Paraguayan soccer player
- Dan Ayala (1937–2018), American basketball coach
- Daniel Ayala (born 1990), Spanish soccer player
- Daniel Ayala (handballer) (born 1995), Chilean handball player
- Diego Ayala (footballer) (born 1990), Paraguayan footballer
- Diego Ayala (tennis) (born 1979), American tennis player
- Eric Ayala (born 1999), Puerto Rican basketball player
- Hercules Ayala (1950–2020), Puerto Rican wrestler
- Josué Ayala (born 1988), Argentine footballer
- Lucas Ayala (born 1978), Argentine footballer
- Luis Ayala (baseball) (born 1978), American-Mexican baseball pitcher
- Luis Ayala (tennis) (1932–2024), Chilean professional tennis player
- Paulie Ayala (born 1970), Mexican-American former boxer
- Ramón Ayala (judoka), (born 1979) Puerto Rican judoka
- Roberto Ayala (born 1973), Argentine international footballer
- Rubén Ayala (born 1950), Argentine retired footballer
- Tony Ayala Jr. (1963–2015), former middleweight boxer

== Other ==
- Aramis Ayala (born 1975), American attorney
- Carlos Ayala Vargas (born 1980), leader of the Spanish Pirate Party
- Francisco J. Ayala (1934–2023), Spanish-American biologist and philosopher

== See also ==
- De Ayala, another surname
- Ayala (disambiguation)
