= Pinchas Abramovich =

Israeli painter (1909–1986)

Pinchas Abramovich 'פנחס אברמוביץ
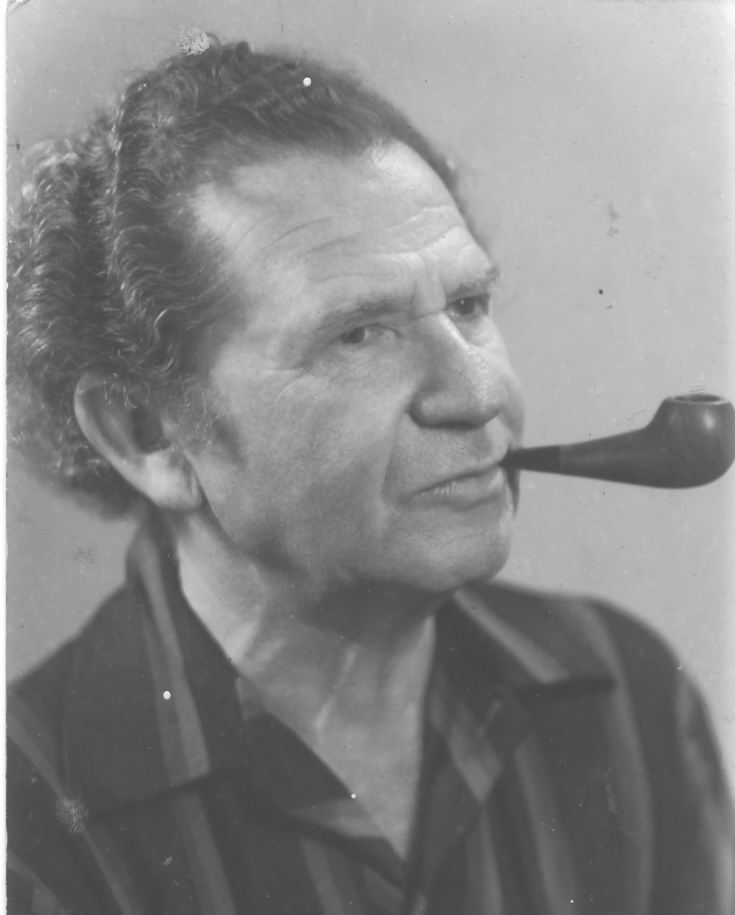
- Born: 1909; Mažeikiai, Russian Empire
- Died: June 1986 (aged 76–77); Tel-Aviv, Israel
- Known for: Painter
- Movement: Ofakim Hadashim
- Awards: Monaco Prize (1966); Dizengoff Prize for Painting and Sculpture (1967; honorary degree, Art Association, Frankfurt, Germany (1985)

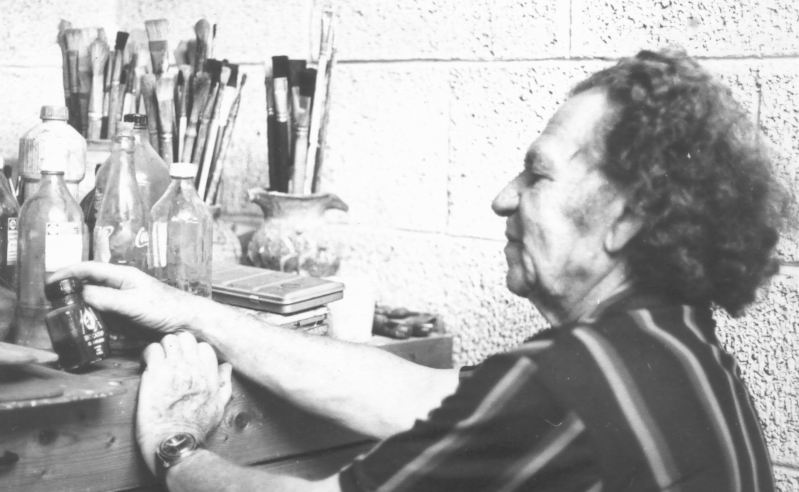
Abramovich in his studio

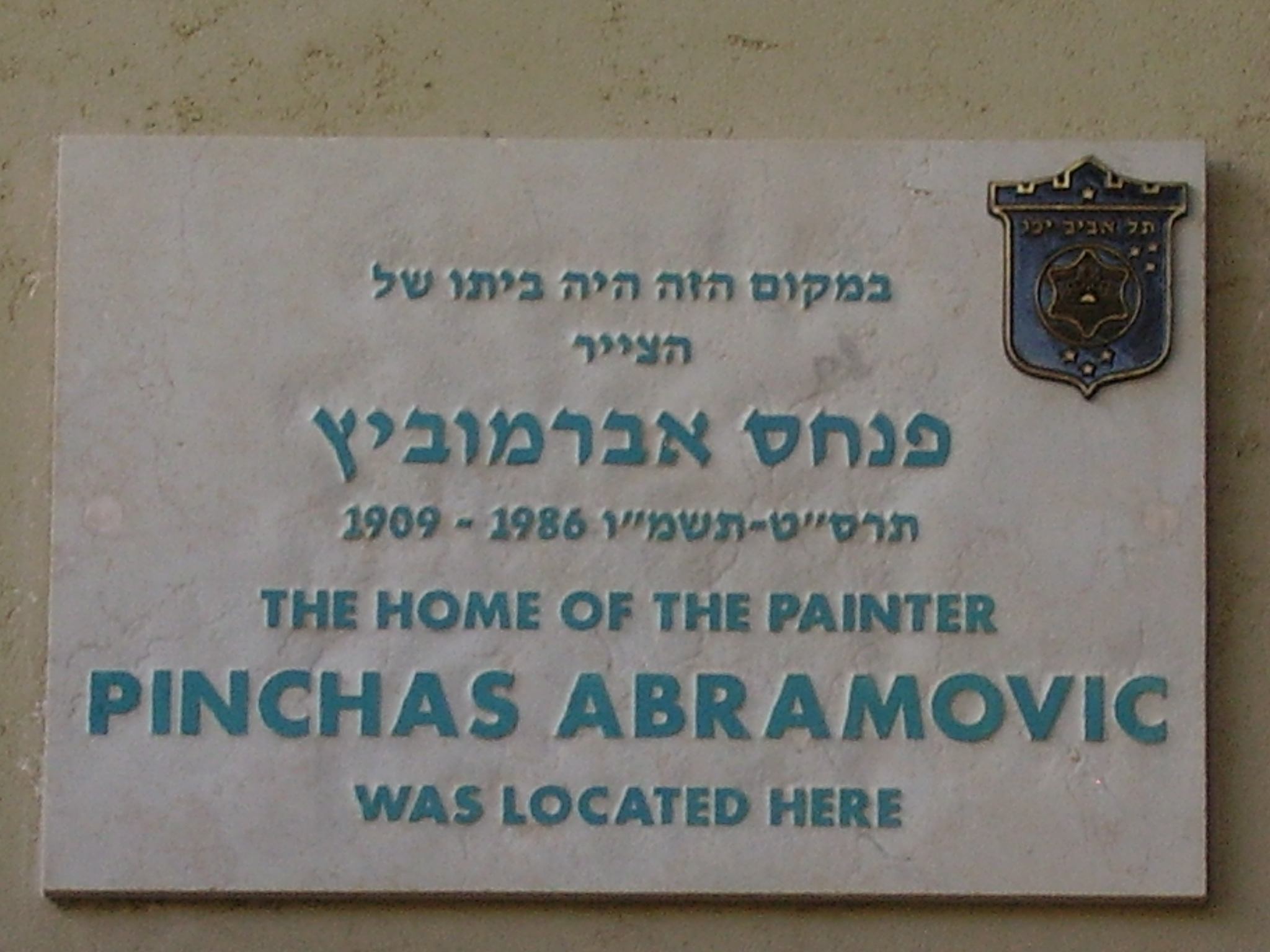
Memorial plaque to the painter Pinchas Abramovich in Tel Aviv

Pinchas Abramovich (Hebrew: 'פנחס אברמוביץ; 1909–1986) was an Israeli painter during the period of the Yishuv and the following days of the state of Israel. He was one of the founders of the Ofakim Hadashim art group.

== Biography ==
Pinhas Abramovich was born in 1909, in Mažeikiai, in the Russian Empire (today, in Lithuania), as the youngest of eight children in a family of Orthodox Jews. In 1925, he studied at the Kaunas Art School. In 1927, he joined Hashomer Hatzair movement and immigrated to Palestine in 1929. He spent his first years in Israel as a worker and a kibbutz member in Kibbutz Beit Zera. In 1932, he moved to Tel Aviv, and spent two years working at the studio of the Israeli artist Joseph Zaritsky together with Yehiel Krize, Arie Aroch, Chaya Schwartz and others. In 1934, Abramovich was accepted to the Painters and Sculptors Association. Between 1935 and 1936, he studied at the Académie de la Grande Chaumière in Paris.

In addition to his artistic activity, in 1938–1941, he joined the Haganah and served in a unit commanded by Orde Wingate. Between 1942 and 1943, he served with the British Army in Egypt, Iraq and Iran. When he returned, he assimilated oriental decorative qualities in his paintings and combined them with influences from the school of Paris.

Abramovich painted in various techniques. He created works on paper, drawings, and also used watercolors. He had a special fondness for the landscapes of Israel, and he used to travel and paint in nature. Abramovich's early work was influenced by European Expressionism. His works, such as Camouflage Enterprise (1948), show some influence of Braquian cubism. In the 1950s, he began to paint in a more abstract style, typical of the Ofakim Hadashim art group.

In 1948 Abramovich and fellow artists founded in Tel Aviv the Ofakim Hadashim group, which was known to have a great influence on Israeli art. Abramovich showed his works at almost all its exhibitions. He also served twice as the secretary of the movement, in 1948–1953 and 1957–1963. In 1952–1972, he taught painting at the Seminar Hakibbutzim. In 1981 and 1984, he was chairman of the Painters and Sculptors Association and in 1985, he was honorary president of the association.

Abramowich died in June 1986 in Tel Aviv of a heart disease at the age of 79.

Numerous key galleries and museums, such as Tel Aviv Museum of Art and the Israel Museum, have featured Abramovich's work in art exhibitions. His paintings have been offered at auctions multiple times, with realized prices ranging from US$58 to US$7,475.

== Awards ==
Abramovich received the following awards:

- 1966: Monaco Prize
- 1967: Dizengoff Prize for Painting and Sculpture
- 1985: Honorary degree, Art Association, Frankfurt, Germany
- 1986: Honorary President of the Israel Painters and Sculptors Association

== See also ==
- List of public art in Israel
- Visual arts in Israel
