= Ayala (given name) =

- Gender: Feminine

Origin
- Origin: Basque, Hebrew, Kazakh, Spanish, Turkish
- Meaning: Various

Ayala is a feminine given name with multiple origins.

It is a Hebrew feminine given name (Hebrew: איילה or אילה) meaning 'gazelle', 'doe' or 'hind' that was among the top 10 names for Jewish newborn girls in Israel in 2024. The Hebrew masculine version of the name is Eyal.

Ayala is also an English transcription of the Kazakh feminine name Аяла, a name among the top 10 names for newborn girls in Kazakhstan in 2024. The name might be etymologically related to the Turkish name Ayla, meaning “ light around the moon.”

The name might also be derived from the Spanish surname Ayala, which is also the Spanish name for the Basque place name Aiara, of uncertain meaning. It is a town in Álava in the Basque region of northern Spain.

== Given name ==
- Florian-Ayala Fauna, American artist, musician, music producer
- Ayala Hakim (born 1960), director of the technology division of Mizrahi-Tefahot Bank, Israel, previously Brigadier-general of the Israeli Defence Forces
- Ayala Hetzroni (born 1938), Israeli Olympic shotputter
- Ayala Ingedashet (born 1978), Ethiopian singer
- Ayala Procaccia (born 1941), Israeli judge
- Ayala Truelove (born 1975), Israeli football player
- Ayala Zacks-Abramov (1912–2011), Israeli art collector

== See also ==
- Ayala (disambiguation)
