= Eyal =

Eyal is a Hebrew masculine given name meaning "deer". The feminine version of the name is Ayala.

The name may refer to:

== Places ==
- Eyal, Israel, an Israeli kibbutz

== People ==
=== Given name ===
- Eyal Almoshnino (born 1976), Israeli footballer
- Eyal Barkan, Israeli trance producer
- Eyal Ben Ami (born 1976), Israeli footballer
- Eyal Ben-Ari (born 1953), professor of anthropology
- Eyal Ben-Reuven (born 1954), Israeli major general in the Israel Defense Forces
- Eyal Berkovic (born 1972), Israeli football player
- Eyal Eisenberg (born 1963), general in the Israel Defense Forces
- Eyal Golan, (born 1971), Israeli singer
- Eyal Golasa, (born 1991), Israeli footballer
- Eyal Gordin, American cinematographer and television director
- Eyal Hertzog (born 1974), co-founder and CCO of video-sharing website Metacafe Hertzog
- Eyal Kitzis (born 1969), Israeli actor, comedian, and TV host
- Eyal Lahman (born 1965), Israeli football manager
- Eyal Levi, (born 1979), American guitarist and songwriter in the band Dååth
- Eyal Levin (born 1986), Israeli Olympic sports sailor
- Eyal Maoz (born 1969), Israeli-born American guitarist, bandleader, and solo performer
- Eyal Meshumar (born 1983), Israeli footballer
- Eyal Meyer (born 1985), Chilean actor
- Eyal Podell (born 1976), Israeli-born American actor
- Eyal Ran (born 1972), Israeli tennis player and Captain of the Israeli Davis Cup team
- Eyal Shulman (born 1987), Israeli basketball player
- Eyal Sivan (born 1964), Israeli documentary filmmaker
- Eyal Stigman (born 1963), Israeli Olympic swimmer
- Eyal Tartazky (born 1977), Israeli footballer
- Eyal Weizman (born 1970), Israeli intellectual and architect
- Eyal Yaffe (born 1960), Israeli basketball player
- Eyal Yifrah, 19-year-old killed in the 2014 kidnapping and murder of Israeli teenagers

=== Surname ===
- Nir Eyal (born 1980), behavioral engineer, author of Hooked: How to Build Habit-Forming Products
- Nir Eyal (bioethicist) (born 1970) - Rutgers bioethicist
- Sharon Eyal (born 1971), Israeli ballet dancer and choreographer
- Shlomi Eyal (born 1959), Israeli fencer
