= Carlos Ayala =

Carlos Ayala may refer to:

- Carlos Ayala (footballer) (born 1982), Salvadoran footballer
- Carlos Capriles Ayala (1923–2014), Venezuelan journalist, historian and ambassador
- Carlos Ayala Vargas (born 1980), Spanish politician
