= Carlos Vargas =

Carlos Vargas may refer to:

- Carlos Vargas (baseball) (born 1999), Dominican baseball pitcher
- Carlos Vargas (cyclist) (born 1997), Colombian para-cyclist
- Carlos Vargas (singer) (born 1984), American Dominican bachata singer
- Carlos Vargas Ferrer (1971–2015), Puerto Rican politician
- Carlos Vargas (footballer) (born 1999), Mexican footballer

== See also ==
- Carlos Ayala Vargas (born 1980), Spanish politician
- Carlos Cortés Vargas (1883–1954), Colombian general
- Jan Carlos Vargas (born 1995), Panamanian footballer
