= Ayala Zacks-Abramov =

Ayala Zacks-Abramov אילה זקס-אברמוב
- Born: 1912; Jerusalem, British Mandate for Palestine (now Israel)
- Died: August 30, 2011 (aged 98–99); Israel
- Occupation: art collector

Ayala Zacks-Abramov (Hebrew: אילה זקס-אברמוב; 1912 – 30 August 2011) was an Israeli-Canadian art collector. Ayala was widowed three times, and was previously married to the Canadian art collector Samuel Jacob Zacks and to the knesset member Zalman Abramov.

== Biography ==
Zacks-Abramov was born in Jerusalem in 1912 as Ayala Ben-Tovim. Her parents, Shmuel Ben-Tovim and Rashe (née: Berman) were married in Jerusalem in 1902. She studied in London and in Paris where she met her first husband, Morris Fleg, whom she married in 1938.

In 1940, during World War II, she joined the French Resistance after Fleg enlisted to the army and was killed during a military operation.

In 1947, she married Samuel Zacks, a Canadian economist and art collector, whom she met during her stay in Switzerland. After marrying, the couple began to collect art items from the 19th century and the 20th century, mainly of French, Canadian and Israeli artists such as Gauguin, Rodin, Picasso, Henri Matisse, Kandinsky and Chagall. They also acquired art by Israeli artists such as Marcel Janco, Mordechai Ardon, Reuven Rubin and Anna Ticho, and art of relatively unknown artists at the time of the purchase such as Ofer Lellouche, Yigal Tumarkin and Joseph Zaritsky.

In 1970, her husband Zacks died. She returned to Israel in 1976 and married Zalman Abramov, who was a lawyer and a Knesset member. The couple were patrons of the arts, and Abramov continued to support the art world even after her husband's death in 1997.

Zachs-Abramov supported over the years the Tel Aviv Museum of Art and the Israel Museum and had a hand in their growth. Both the museums have halls named after her. She mentioned these museums in her will, in which she declared that her art collection would be divided between them.

The Israeli notable painter Joseph Zaritsky painted a well-known figurative portrait of her.

Many of the art works in Zachs-Abramov's possession were donated or loaned through to years to museums in Israel, France and Canada.
