= De Ayala =

De Ayala is a surname. Notable people with the surname include:

- Adelardo López de Ayala y Herrera (1828–1879), Spanish writer and politician
- Enrique Zóbel de Ayala (1877–1943), Spanish-born Filipino industrialist, philanthropist, and a leader of the Philippine Falange political party
- Felipe Guaman Poma de Ayala (c. 1550–after 1616), indigenous Peruvian chronicler during the Spanish conquest
- Fernando Zobel de Ayala (born 1960), Filipino businessman, brother of Jaime Augusto Zobel de Ayala
- Jaime Augusto Zobel de Ayala (born 1959), current CEO of Ayala Corporation, son of Jaime Zobel de Ayala
- Jaime Zobel de Ayala (born 1934), Filipino businessman and photographer, founder of the Ayala Corporation
- Josefa de Óbidos (c.1630–1684), Spanish-born Portuguese painter who signed her work as Josefa de Ayala or Josefa em Óbidos
- Juan de Ayala (1745–1797), Spanish naval officer and explorer
- Pero López de Ayala (1332–1407), Castilian statesman, historian, poet, chronicler, chancellor, and courtier
- Pedro de Ayala (died 1513), Spanish diplomat in England and Scotland
- Pero López de Ayala (1332–1407), Castilian chronicler, diplomat, and poet
- Pilar López de Ayala (born 1978), Spanish film actress
- Ramón Pérez de Ayala (circa 1880–1962), Spanish writer

== See also ==
- Ayala (surname)
