= Ayala =

Ayala may refer to:

== Places ==
- Ciudad Ayala, Morelos, Mexico
- Ayala Alabang, a barangay in Muntinlupa, Philippines
- Ayala Avenue, a major thoroughfare in the Makati Central Business District, Philippines
- Ayala, Magalang, a barrio in Magalang, Pampanga, Philippines
- Ayala, Zamboanga, a barrio in Zamboanga City, Philippines
- Ayala/Aiara, a town in Álava province, Spain

== People ==
- Ayala (given name)
- Ayala (surname), a surname of Basque origin
- Ayala (musician), musician, singer, songwriter and TV presenter of The Ayala Show
- Ayala, a character in Star Trek: Voyager, see List of Star Trek: Voyager characters#Ayala

== Arts and entertainment ==
- Yowlah (also called "ayala"), a traditional dance of the United Arab Emirates and Oman
- "Ayala", a song from the album 17 by XXXTentacion
- Ayala (Star Trek), a fictional character on Star Trek: Voyager
- Ayala Dormer, a fictional character in Anthony Trollope's novel Ayala's Angel

== Other uses ==
- Ayala Corporation, a conglomerate operating in the Philippines
- Ayala Center, a commercial development at Makati, Philippines
- Ayala Malls, a chain of shopping malls in the Philippines
- Ayala & Co., a champagne producer
- Ayala (horse), a racehorse that won the 1963 Grand National
- Ruben S. Ayala High School, California, USA

== See also ==
- Ein Ayala, a semi-cooperative moshav in northern Israel
