= Jessica Ayala =

American politician

Member of New Hampshire House of Representatives for Hillsborough 31
- In office 2016–2018

Personal details
- Party: Democratic
- Education: Daniel Webster College

Jessica Ayala is an American politician. She was a member of the New Hampshire House of Representatives and represented the Hillsborough 31st district.
