= Yehiel Krize =

Israeli painter

Yehiel Krize יחיאל קריזה
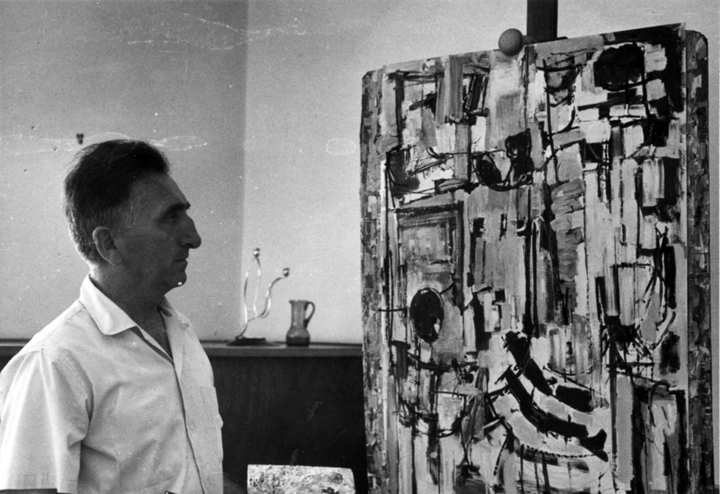
- Yehiel Krize, 1958
- Born: 1908; Kalisz, Congress Poland
- Died: 1968 (aged 59–60)
- Education: Avigdor Stematsky
- Known for: Painting

Yehiel Krize (Hebrew: יחיאל קריזה; 1908–1968) was an Israeli painter.

== Biography ==
Krize was born and raised in a Jewish family in the town of Kalisz in central Poland. In 1923 he immigrated to Land of Israel with his mother, two brothers and two sisters and settled in the Makor Chaim neighborhood of Jerusalem. In 1924, the family reunited with father Yitzhak, a member of the Mizrachi movement, who established a workshop for weaving keffiyehs.

Due to the family's livelihood difficulties, the family moved to the barracks neighborhood in Petah Tikva, where the father worked as a paint contractor. In his youth as a pioneer, Yechiel worked in the orchards in Binyamina. In his youth he sometimes engaged in weaving, which according to his testimony influenced his style. Together with Pinchas Abramovich, whom he met in Binyamina, he approached the art world and began painting in Yosef Zaritzky's studio in Tel Aviv. He studied with Avigdor Stematsky and went to study in Paris.

In 1933 he married Ruth Kowalski, a distant relative who had brought her to Israel from Poland two years earlier using a marriage certificate that was necessary for her to immigrate to Israel during British rule. Upon arriving in Israel, the certificate was revoked and they were officially married in 1933. The couple had an only daughter named Tamar. In 1942, he exhibited at the Eight Exhibition, which was presented in the Habima building. In 1947–1948 he twice won the Dizengoff Prize for Painting and Sculpture.

His early paintings were lost and with one exception or two, landscape paintings made in watercolors, his works familiar to us were made in gouache paints from the mid-1940s onwards. For about ten years, Kriza painted the sights of Haifa, Tiberias, Safed and Jaffa and the everyday reality in them. The works are on paper in a horizontal format and depict everyday figures in a dense urban landscape. His work is slowly turning in the direction of increasing abstraction. From 1958 he moved to painting in oil on canvas. The format grows and usually becomes vertical, and the colors lighten up until most of the fabric area is covered in shades of white. This follows a seven-month stay in New York.

Despite Krize's friendship with New Horizon artists and his conceptual closeness to them, Krize never officially joined the group. This is probably because they feared the authority of Joseph Zaritsky and a desire to maintain complete artistic freedom. Therefore he exhibited in her ranks as a guest artist once and only in her tenth exhibition in July 1963 (he presented three works). In art reviews from the period, many lives have praised the free use of color in his works. In the 1960s, he presented a +10 group organized by Rafi Lavi as part of exhibitions.

== Awards and recognition ==
- 1947 Dizengoff Prize
- 1961 Milo Club Prize

== Education ==
- 1933 with Stematsky; art studio in Petach Tikvah with Abramowitz, Tamari

== Teaching ==
- 1960-1963 Avni Institute of Art Studies, Tel Aviv

== See also ==
- List of Israel Prize recipients
- Visual arts in Israel
