= Vanessa Ayala =

American artist

Vanessa Ayala (Art by Ayala) is an American visual artist based in New York City.

== Early life ==
Ayala is a Colombian-American artist of Indigenous ancestry. She attended a high school dedicated to the performing arts. She earned a scholarship to attend the California College of the Arts in San Francisco, where she trained in classical fine art and motion graphics graduating with a Bachelor of Fine Arts. Through her art she has amassed a following of 50 thousand followers across social media platforms.

== Art ==
Much of Ayala’s art is influenced by and a reflection of pop culture. She describes her style as an exploration of divine feminine energy drawing inspiration from her native ancestry and representation. Her biggest inspirations include: Andy Warhol, Kehinde Wiley, Selena. Ayala enjoys painting large vibrant portraits of female celebrities and pop culture icons. Her painted portraits include Selena and Frida Kahlo. Her work seeks to explore ideas of self love and representation.

== Exhibitions ==
Her work has been featured in multiple exhibitions, including a 2017 exhibition held by The Selena Museum, in Corpus Christi, Texas. The exhibition featured fan art. Her work was featured in Fashion Design of Latin America (FDLA) and Art Basel Miami's exhibition, Arte & Moda 2021.
