= Isidro Más de Ayala =

Uruguayan psychiatrist, lecturer, and author

Doctor Isidro Más de Ayala
- Born: 1899; Montevideo
- Died: 1960 (aged 60–61); Montevideo
- Education: University of the Republic
- Medical career
- Profession: Physician
- Field: Psychiatry

Isidro Más de Ayala (Montevideo, 1899 - 1960) was a Uruguayan psychiatrist, professor, and author.

== Selected works ==
=== Medical ===
- Infancia, adolescencia, juventud (A. Monteverde y Cia, 1940)
- Por qué se enloquece la gente (1944)
- Psiquis y soma (1947)

=== Fiction, chronicle, humor ===
- Cuadros del hospital (1926, short stories)
- El loco que yo maté (Palacio del Libro, 1941)
- El inimitable Fidel González (Palacio del Libro, 1947)
- Leer es partir un poco (A. Monteverde y Cia, 1954)
- Montevideo y su cerro (Gleizer, 1956. Reprint 1960)
- Y por el sur del Río de la Plata (Palacio del Libro, 1958)
