= Eyal Ben Ami =

Israeli footballer

Eyal Ben Ami אייל בן עמי
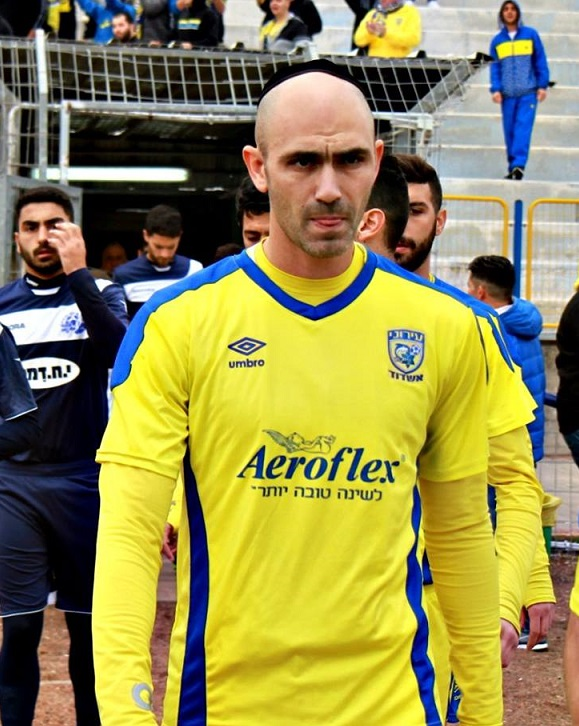

Personal information
- Full name: Eyal Ben Ami
- Date of birth: August 29, 1976 (age 50)
- Place of birth: Bat Yam, Israel
- Position: Midfielder

Youth career
- Hapoel Tel Aviv

Senior career*
Years	Team	Apps	(Gls)
1993–2005	Hapoel Tel Aviv	151	(7)
2000–2001	→ Hapoel Petah Tikva (loan)	33	(6)
2001–2002	→ Ironi Rishon leZion (loan)	31	(3)
2004–2005	Hapoel Kiryat Shmona		
2005–2006	Hapoel Nazareth Illit	20	(1)
2006	F.C. Ashdod	0	(0)
2009–2010	Hapoel Kfar Shalem	28	(7)
2010–2011	Hapoel Nahlat Yehuda	20	(2)
2012–2013	Hapoel Bat Yam	21	(7)
2013–2014	Hapoel Nahlat Yehuda	19	(2)
2016–2017	Hapoel Nahlat Yehuda	7	(0)
2017	Maccabi Ironi Ashdod	11	(0)

International career
1995	Israel U21	1	(0)
2001–2002	Israel	2	(0)
- * Club domestic league appearances and goals

Eyal Ben Ami (Hebrew: אייל בן עמי; born August 29, 1976) is a retired Israeli professional footballer who played for Maccabi Ironi Ashdod, Hapoel Tel Aviv, Hapoel Petah Tikva, Ironi Rishon leZion, Hapoel Kiryat Shmona, Hapoel Nazareth Illit, F.C. Ashdod and Hapoel Kfar Shalem. At international level, Ben Ami was capped at under-21 level and represented the Israel senior team twice.
