= Pinchas Litvinovsky =

Israeli painter (1894–1985)

- פנחס ליטבינובסקי
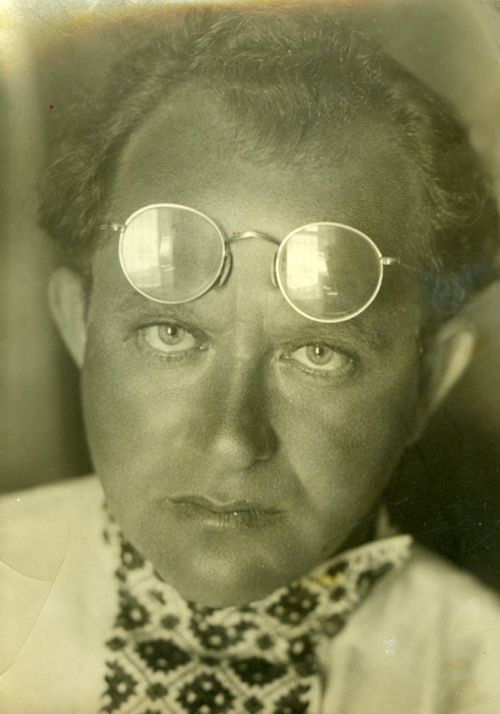
- Portrait of Pinchas Litvinovsky - Gabriel Talphir Archive, Information Center for Israeli Art, Israel Museum, Jerusalem
- Born: Piotr Vladimirovich Litvinovsky; August 11, 1894; Novogeorgievsk, Ukraine
- Died: September 15, 1985 (aged 91); Jerusalem, Israel
- Resting place: Har HaMenuchot
- Known for: Painting, drawing
- Movement: Israeli art
- Awards: Israel Prize (1980), Dizengoff Prize (1939)

Pinchas Litvinovsky (Hebrew: פנחס ליטבינובסקי; August 11, 1894 – September 15, 1985), was an Israeli painter.

== Biography ==
Litvinovsky was born on August 11, 1894, in Novogeorgievsk, to a religious Jewish family. He studied at the Academy of Art in Odessa, Bezalel Academy of Arts and Design in Jerusalem and Imperial Academy of Arts in the city Saint Petersburg, Russia.

Litvinovsky immigrated to Mandate Palestine in 1919 with the first wave of settlers of the Third Aliyah, on board the SS. Ruslan along with the painter Yitzhak Frenkel and the architects Zeev Rechter and Yehuda Megidovitch.

In the 1930s, Litvinovsky traveled to Paris several times where he encountered the art of Georges Roux, Paul Cézanne, Henri Matisse, Pablo Picasso Joan Miró, and the painters of the School of Paris. In the early 1950s, Litvinovsky settled down in the Katamon neighbourhood of Jerusalem, In the house that Moshe Dayan gave him. He won several awards for his achievements, most notably the 1980 Israel Prize for Painting.

Litvinovsky became known for his portraits of famous people from Israel and around the world. Towards the end of his life, he created an exceptional series of portraits of rabbis. Curator Amichai Chasson describes these works as an attempt "to merge the lofty spiritual element with the mundane".

Pinchas Litvinovsky died on September 15, 1985, in Jerusalem.

== Selected solo exhibitions ==
- 1935 - the Bezalel National Museum
- 1944 - Tel Aviv Museum of Art
- 1960 - A retrospective exhibition in the home of Helena Rubinstein,Tel Aviv Museum of Art
- 1986 - to commemorate the first anniversary of Litvinovsky's death, the Knesset
- 1990 - Pinchas Litvinovsky: In Search of the Roots of Life, The Israel Museum in Jerusalem (curator: Yigal Zalmona)
- 2024 - Pinchas Litvinovsky: You Must Choose Life—That is Art (curator: Amichai Chasson), Beit Avi Chai Gallery, Jerusalem

== Awards and recognition ==
- In 1939, Dizengoff Prize for Painting and Sculpture, Municipality of Tel Aviv – Jaffa
- In 1970, Litvinovsky received the Yakir Yerushalayim (Worthy Citizen of Jerusalem) award (along with Anna Ticho).
- In 1980 - Israel Prize for Painting (with Anna Ticho and Yosl Bergner).

== See also ==
- List of Israel Prize recipients
- Visual arts in Israel
- Litvinovsky web page
