= Carlos Ayala Vargas =

Spanish politician (born 1980)

Carlos de la Cruz Ayala Vargas (Note: In this Spanish name, the first or paternal surname is Ayala and the second or maternal family name is Vargas.) (born April 2, 1980) is a Spanish politician, co-founder of the Spanish Pirate Party, and was leader of the party from its foundation in 2006 until September 2010. Born in Esplugues de Llobregat, Ayala studied at the Charles III University of Madrid and lives in Ulea, Murcia.
