= Yigal Zalmona =

Israeli curator, art critic and art historian

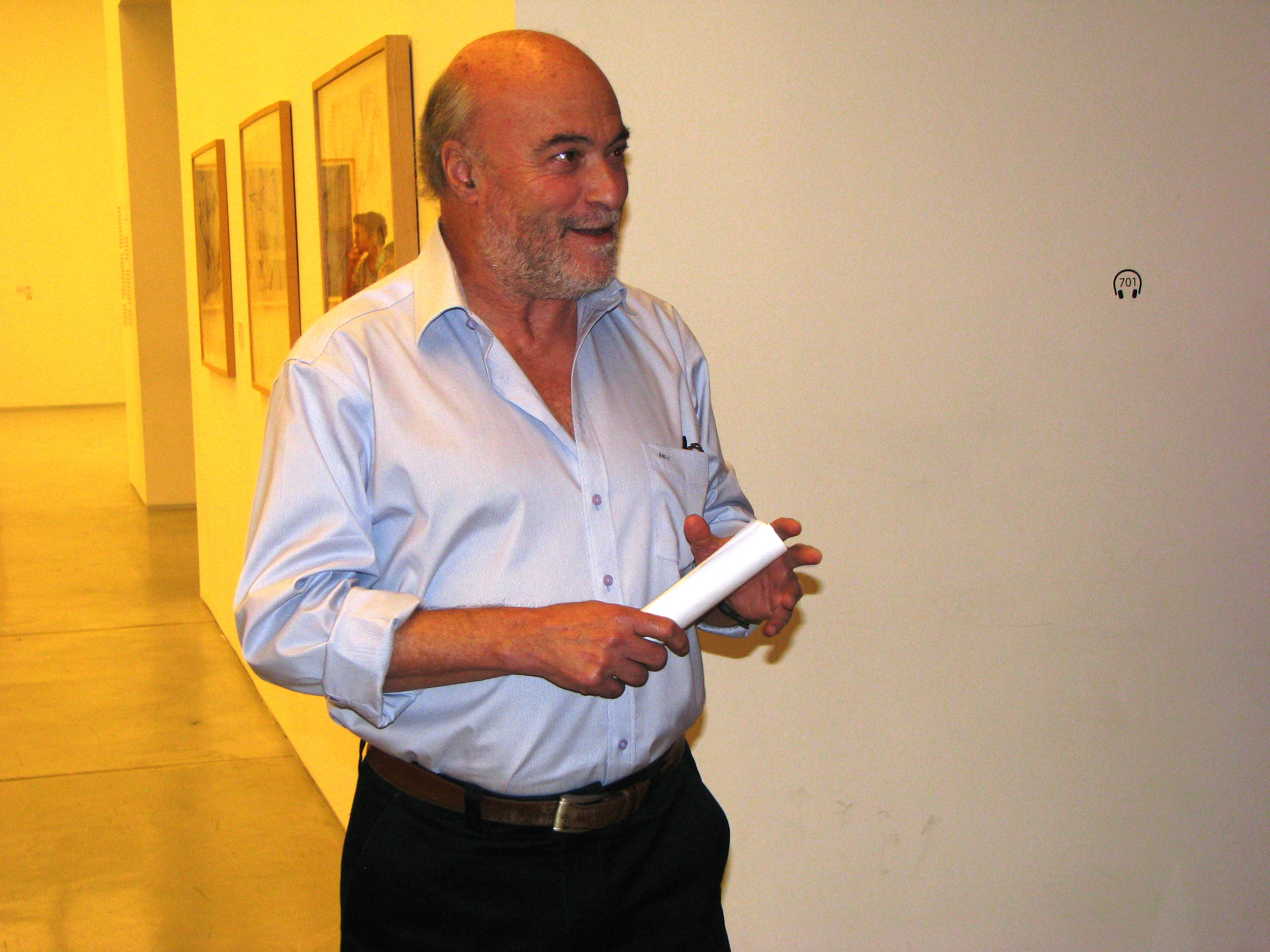
Yigal Zalmona

Yigal Zalmona (Hebrew: יגאל צלמונה) is an Israeli curator, art critic and historian. He was the chief interdisciplinary curator of the Israel Museum in Jerusalem.

== Biography ==
Yigal Zalmona was born in Tel Aviv. He grew up in the city's Neve Shaanan neighborhood. His father was a dentist. At the age of 20, Zalmona enrolled in art studies at the Sorbonne in Paris, completing a bachelor's degree and a master's degree. He wrote his master's thesis on Jean Dubuffet, a French painter and sculptor who pioneered the theory of "low art" and what is now called outsider art. Zalmona was offered a job as a teaching assistant at the Sorbonne, but chose to return to Israel.

Zalmona wrote his doctorate on the Eastern influences on Israeli art in the early 20th century.

In 1996, he was promoted from Curator of Israeli Art at the Israel Museum to Senior Curator and deputy director of the museum, until his retirement from the museum in 2012.

He teaches at the art department of the Shenkar College of Engineering and Design in Ramat Gan.

== Published works in English ==
- Art about art: Two texts and one interview with Osvaldo Romberg, Delson-Richter Galleries, Old Jaffa, 1978
- Creation and Involvement in Israeli Art: a Sketch, in: The Shadow of Conflict: Israeli art 1980–1989, The Jewish Museum, New York, p. 15–19, 1989
- Ali Baba's Cave, Philip Rantzer: I love Art and Art Loves Me, Museum Moderne Kunst, Passau
- On the Exhibition 'Kadima': Orientalism in Israeli art, The Jerusalem Review, p. 51–55, 1997
- Landscape of the Bible: Sacred Scenes in European Master Paintings, The Israel Museum, Jerusalem, 2000
- Uri Katzenstein, Home, Israeli Pavilion, Venice Biennale, 2001
- New Jew, Old Orient: Reflections on Art, Place and Identity, in: Israele Arte e Vita 1906–2006, Palazzo Reale, Milano
- Treasures from the Holy Land, Museum of Fine Arts, Budapest, 2009
- A Century of Israeli Art

== See also ==
- Visual arts in Israel
