= Israel Paldi =

Israeli painter (1892–1979)

Israel Paldi (Feldman) ישראל פלדי (פלדמן)
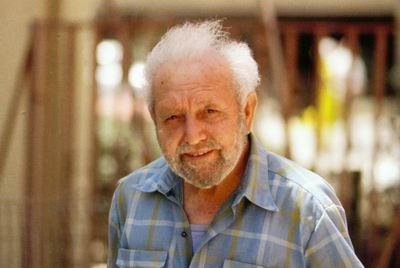
- Israel Paldi
- Born: 1892; Ukraine
- Died: 1979 (aged 86–87)
- Education: Bezalel school, Jerusalem
- Known for: Painting
- Movement: Israeli art

Israel Paldi (Feldman) (Hebrew: ישראל פלדי (פלדמן); 1892–1979) was an Israeli artist.

== Biography ==
Israel Feldman (later Paldi) was born in 1892 in Ukraine. In 1909, he immigrated to Palestine and began to study art at the Bezalel School in Jerusalem. He returned to Europe to study at the Academy of Fine Arts, Munich, from 1911 to 1914.

After winning a prize in Paris in 1926 for his work on a stage set for "The Fisherman's Tent," he went on to win the Dizengoff Prize for Painting and Sculpture in Tel Aviv three times: 1943, 1953 and 1959.
