= Arieh Lubin =

Israeli artist

Arieh (Leo) Lubin אריה (לאו) לובין
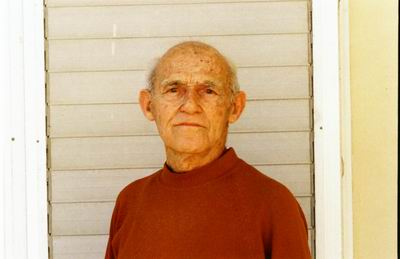
- Born: 6 December 1897; US
- Died: 17 January 1980 (aged 82); Tel Aviv, Israel
- Known for: Painting
- Movement: Israeli art

Arieh Lubin (Hebrew: אריה לובין; 6 December 1897 – 17 January 1980) was an Israeli artist.

== Biography ==
Arieh (Leo) Lubin began to study art in Chicago in 1915, but left to join the Jewish Legion in World War I. After the war, he studied in Europe and returned to Israel in 1922.

== Artistic style ==
Lubin's work reflects contemporary trends of the 1920s. His main influences were Paul Cézanne, Pablo Picasso, and Henri Matisse. He absorbed the Cubism of Derain and the Purism of Le Corbusier and Ozenfant by reading "L'Esprit Nouveau", a journal he ordered from Paris. Lubin was one of the first Israeli artists to settle in the artists quarter of Safed.

Lubin died in Tel Aviv in 1980. He is buried in Trumpeldor Cemetery.

== Awards and recognition ==
- 1922 John Quincy Adams Prize for Study Abroad
- 1956 Ramat Gan Panorama Prize
- 1957 Olympic Committee Prize for Sports Subjects
- 1957 Dizengoff Prize
- 1978 Worthy of Tel Aviv

== See also ==
- Visual arts in Israel
