= Reuven Rubin =

Israeli painter (1893–1974)

- ראובן רובין
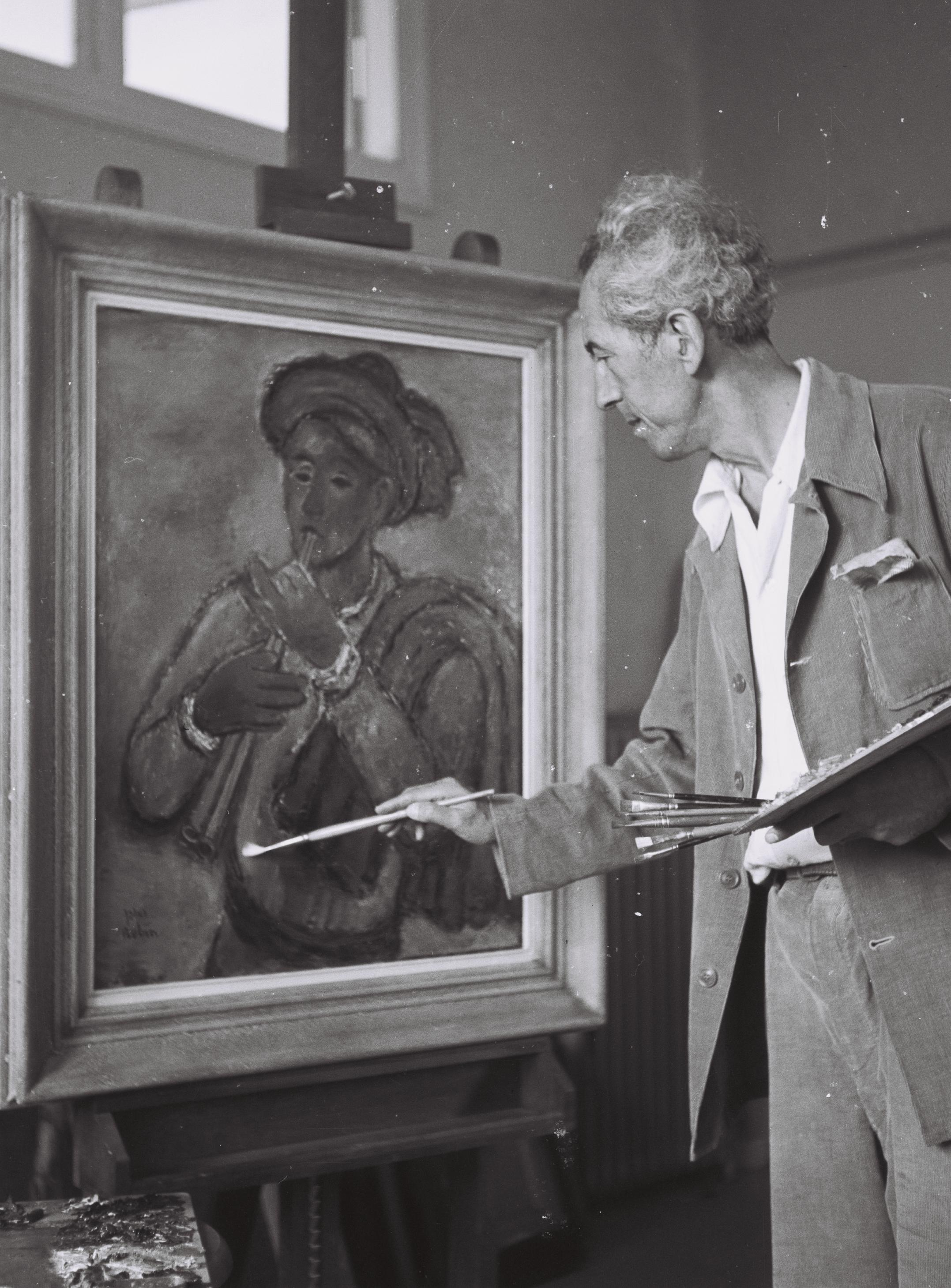
- Reuven Rubin in his studio, 1946
- Born: Rubin Zelicovici; November 13, 1893; Galaţi, Romania
- Died: October 13, 1974 (aged 80); Tel Aviv, Israel
- Education: Bezalel Academy of Art and Design in Jerusalem; the École Nationale Supérieure des Beaux-Arts in Paris
- Style: Eretz-Yisrael
- Spouse: Esther
- Awards: 1964 Dizengoff Prize; 1973 Israel Prize

Reuven Rubin (Hebrew: ראובן רובין, Yiddish: רובין זעליקאָװיטש; November 13, 1893 – October 13, 1974) was a Romanian-born Israeli painter and Israel's first diplomatic representative to Romania.

== Biography ==
Reuven Zelicovici (later Reuven Rubin) was born in Galaţi to a poor Romanian Jewish Hasidic family. His father, Rebbe Yoel, served as a synagogue cantor and beadle, and his mother Faige, a rabbi's daughter, was married in an arranged match at the age of 15. Reuven was the eighth of 13 children, of whom only three survived. His artistic talent began to emerge at the age of three, while studying in cheder, a religious school for boys. Some of his paintings, sent in by his brother's friend, were published in a children's magazine, but his interest in art received no encouragement at home.

After creating a mizrah plaque for a synagogue in his hometown, he began to attraction attention and won a government prize. At the age of 15, he worked as a bookkeeper for a wine shop. A non-Jew who saw him working on a painting in the courtyard bought two of his paintings for the equivalent of $400. He persuaded the family to move to Falticeni, where his paternal grandmother lived. Here they had a small farm and their finances improved. In 1911, Dr. Adolf Stander, a Zionist leader, provided him with a scholarship and recommended that he study art at the Bezalel art school in Jerusalem.

In February 1912, he set out for Palestine but was not happy with the school's approach and being assigned to an ivory carving workshop. In 1913, he left for Paris, France, to pursue his studies at the École Nationale Supérieure des Beaux-Arts. At the outbreak of World War I, he returned to Romania.

In 1921, he traveled to the United States with his friend and fellow artist, Arthur Kolnik, with whom he had shared a studio in Cernăuţi. In New York City, the two met artist Alfred Stieglitz, who was instrumental in organizing their first American show at the Anderson Gallery. Following the exhibition, in 1922, they both returned to Europe. In 1923, Rubin emigrated to Mandate Palestine.

Rubin met his wife, Esther, in 1928, aboard a passenger ship to Palestine on his return from a show in New York City. She was a Bronx girl who had won a trip to Palestine in a Young Judea competition.

== Artistic career ==
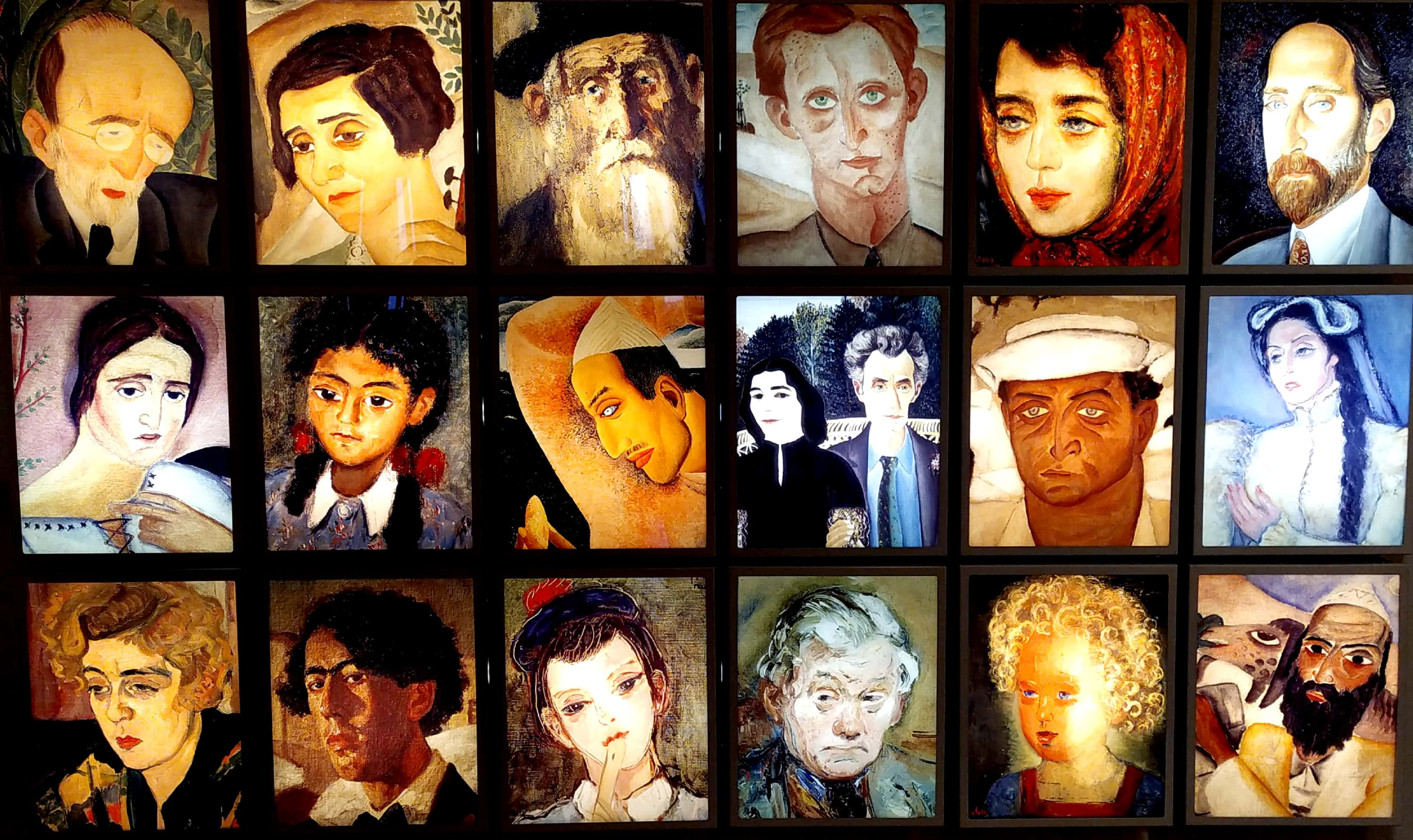
Panel of works at Reuven Rubin Museum, Tel Aviv

The history of Israeli art began at a very specific moment in the history of international art, at a time of Cezannian rebellion against the conventions of the past, a time typified by rapid stylistic changes. Thus Jewish national art had no fixed history, and no canon to obey. Rubin began his career at a fortunate time.

The painters who depicted the country’s landscapes in the 1920s rebelled against Bezalel. They sought current styles in Europe that would help portray their own country’s landscape, in keeping with the spirit of the time. Rubin’s Cezannesque landscapes from the 1920s were defined by both a modern and a naive style, portraying the landscape and inhabitants of Israel in a sensitive fashion. His landscape paintings in particular paid special detail to a spiritual, translucent light.

In Palestine, he became one of the founders of the new Eretz-Yisrael style. Recurring themes in his work were the biblical landscape, folklore and people, including Yemenite, Hasidic Jews and Arabs. Many of his paintings are sun-bathed depictions of Jerusalem and the Galilee. Rubin might have been influenced by the work of Henri Rousseau whose style combined Eastern nuances, as well as by the neo-Byzantine art to which Rubin had been exposed in his native Romania. In accordance with his integrative style, he signed his works with his first name in Hebrew and his surname in Roman letters.

In 1924, he was the first artist to hold a solo exhibition at the Tower of David, in Jerusalem (later exhibited in Tel Aviv at Gymnasia Herzliya). That year he was elected chairman of the Association of Painters and Sculptors of Palestine. From the 1930s onwards, Rubin designed backdrops for Habima Theater, the Ohel Theater and other theaters.

His autobiography, published in 1969, is titled My Life - My Art. He died in Tel Aviv in October 1974, after having bequeathed his home on 14 Bialik Street and a core collection of his paintings to the city of Tel Aviv. The Rubin Museum opened in 1983. The director and curator of the museum is his daughter-in-law, Carmela Rubin. Rubin's paintings are now increasingly sought after. At a Sotheby's auction in New York City in 2007, his work accounted for six of the ten top lots.

== Diplomatic career ==
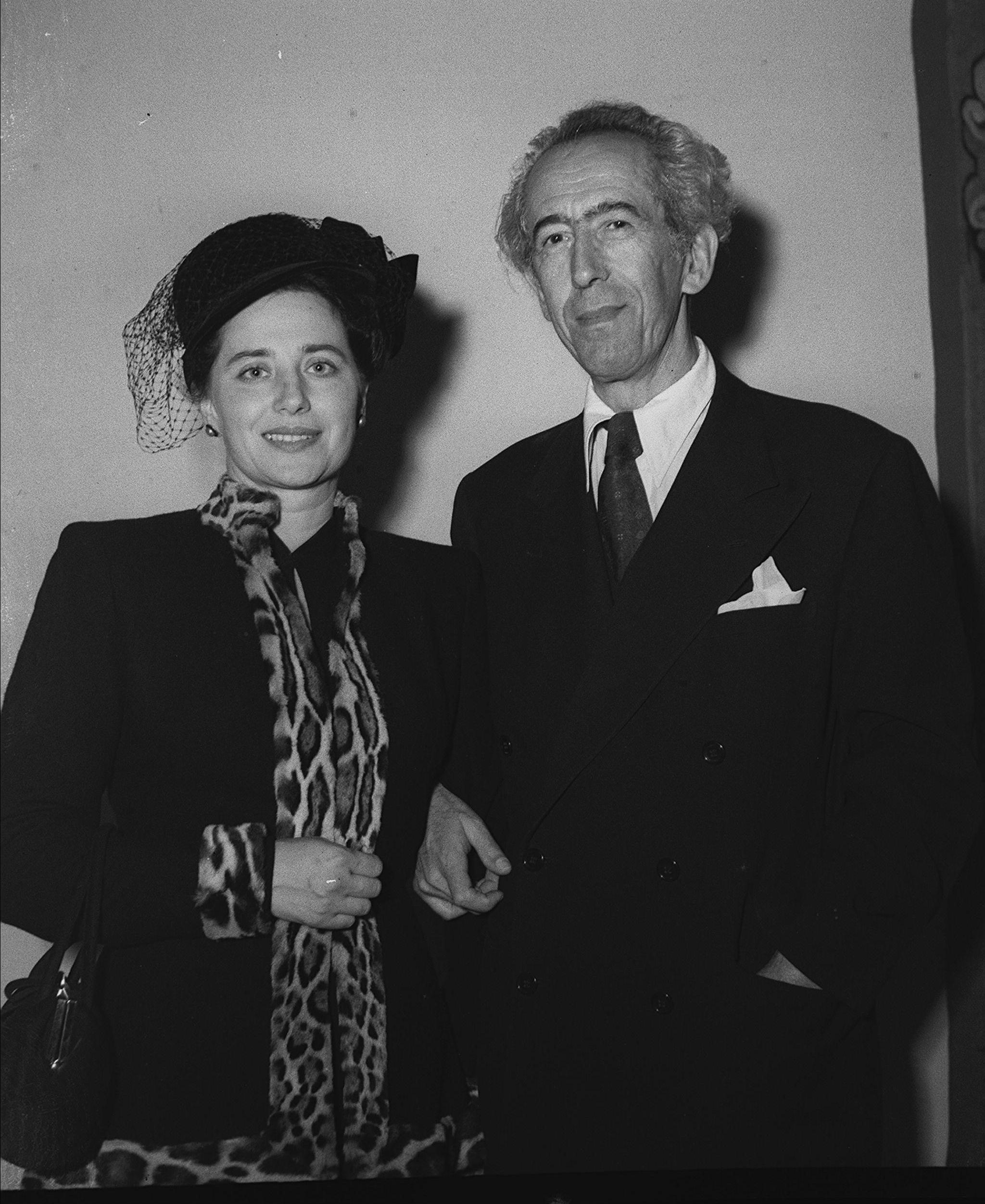
Reuven Rubin and his wife Esther, 1948

In 1948, he became the first official Israeli diplomatic envoy (minister) to Romania. He served in this position until 1950.

== Gallery ==
The Beginnings of Tel-Aviv, oil painting, 1912

Galilean Hills, oil on canvas

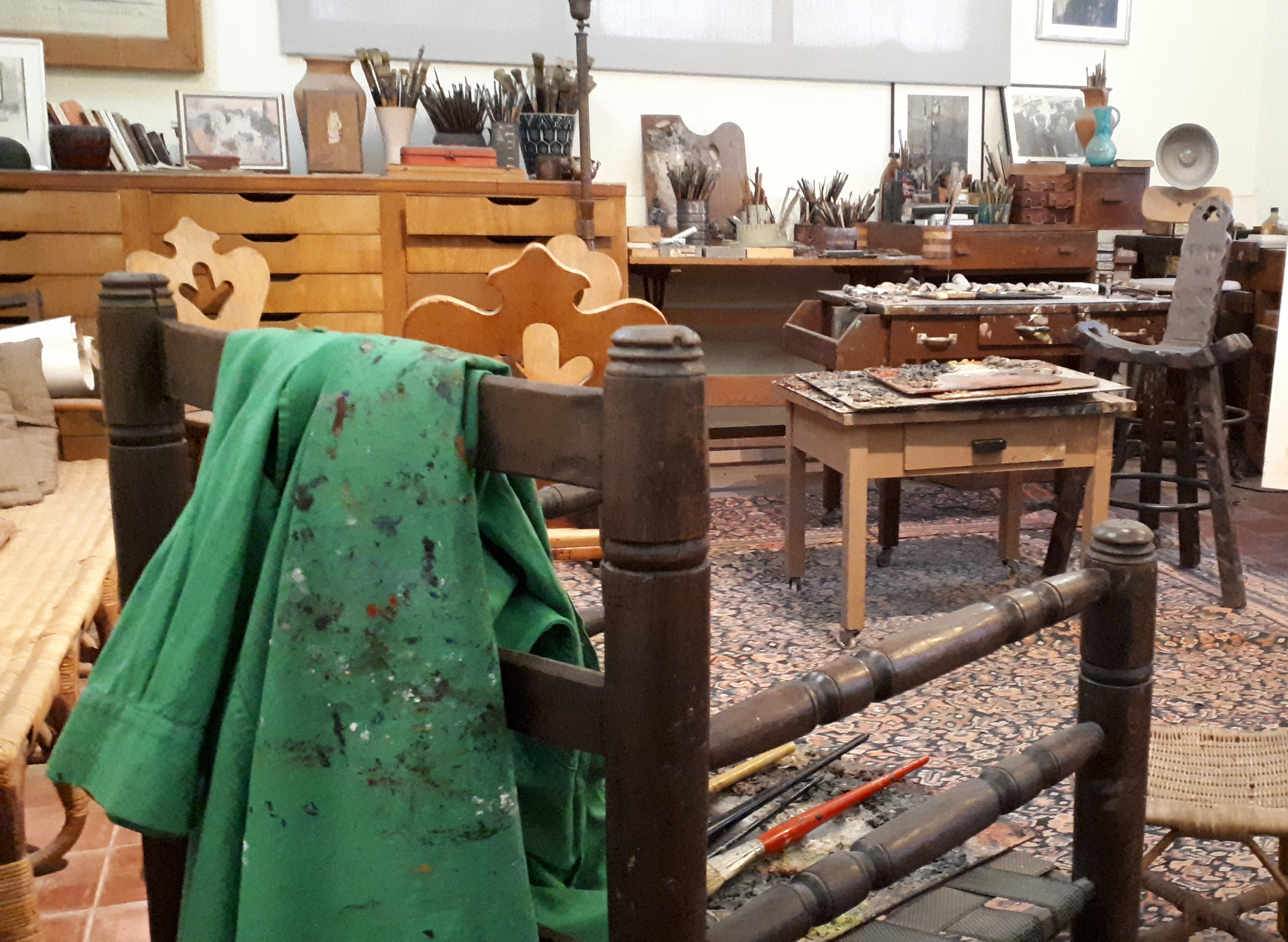
Reuven Rubin's studio in Tel Aviv

== Awards and commemoration ==
- 1926 Awarded the Lord Plumer Prize
- 1945 Receives Honorary Doctorate of Hebrew Letters, Jewish Institute of Religion, New York
- 1964, Rubin received an "honorary award" of the Dizengoff Prize for Painting.
- 1971 Awarded the "Artist of the year", University of Judaism, Los Angeles
- 1973, he was awarded the Israel Prize, for painting.

== See also ==
- List of Israel Prize recipients
- Visual arts in Israel
