= Tower of David (disambiguation) =

The Tower of David is the historical citadel of Jerusalem.

Tower of David may also refer to:

- Tower of David (northeast tower), the Herodian tower who gave its name to the entire Jerusalem Citadel
- Centro Financiero Confinanzas nicknamed "Tower of David", a skyscraper in Caracas, Venezuela
- "Tower of David" (Homeland), a 2013 episode of the TV series Homeland
- Tower of David Period, a nickname given to Jewish art in the Land of Israel/Palestine of the 1920s
