= Phasael (disambiguation) =

Phasael is the English form of an ancient Semitic, probably mainly Nabataean name used for both men and women. Fasayil is a modern Arabic version, Petza'el a Modern Hebrew one.

Phasael may refer to:

== People ==
- Phasael (name)
- Phasael (died 40 BCE), elder brother of Herod the Great. Both the town of Phasaelis and the Phasaelus tower in Jerusalem were named after him.
- Phasaelis (princess), also Phasael, Phaisael, born 5/4 BCE: Nabataean princess

== Places and buildings ==
- Fasayil, Palestinian village in the Jordan Valley at the site of the town of Phasaelis, est. by Herod
- Petza'el, Israeli settlement in the Jordan Valley, named after Herod's Phasaelis
- Tower of David (northeast tower), part of the Citadel of Jerusalem, possibly the Phasael (Phasaelus) Tower built by Herod and named after his brother
