= Phasael (name) =

Phasael, Phasa'el
- Gender: Unisex

Origin
- Origin: Semitic, mainly Nabataean: Fṣʾl/Pṣ(y)ʾl, pronounced Faṣā-ʾel/Faṣay-ʾel
- Meaning: ʾl delivered (El delivered)
- Region of origin: Nabataea (mainly Transjordan, less so in Ḥarra (Black Desert) and Ḥismā regions in southern Syria and north & northwest Arabia), Judaea (Idumaea)

Other names
- Cognates: Phasael/Phasa'el; for feminine form also Phasaelis, Phaisael

Phasael or Phasa'el is an ancient Semitic, probably mainly Nabataean, gender-neutral name, i.e. used for both men and women.

== Etymology ==
The Semitic name took the form Faṣay-ʾel, and through contraction Faṣā-ʾel. According to Jérôme Norris, its meaning is "ʾl delivered" (see El (deity)).

The Semitic root pṣy takes in Aramaic and Hebrew the meaning 'to rescue, to deliver', and in Classical Arabic that of 'to separate, to remove', which by extension becomes 'to escape, to become free'. Safaitic inscriptions attest to the frequent use of words based on this root in invocations of divinities with the meaning of 'deliver!' and 'deliverance'. This convinces Norris of the meaning 'ʾl delivered' for Phasael, as opposed to opinions interpreting it as meaning 'God has opened (the womb)', or to seeing it as an innovative Hebrew theophoric name from the Second Temple period, given that among the Greek inscriptions containing it, only one is from Judaea, compared to twenty-nine from Transjordan and southern Syria, plus the fact that, as of 2017, it does not occur in any known Hebrew or Jewish Aramaic material. Norris, citing a 1975 paper by J.T. Milik and J. Starcky, explains the use of the name by Antipater for one of his sons, an older brother of King Herod, through the influence of his wife, who was of Arab/Nabataean origin.

The name was rendered in many different spellings in Greek, in the masculin form mainly as Φασάηλος, Phasaelos, which in Latin became Phasaelus.

== Historical figures and derived uses ==
=== Herodians ===
There were three princes by the name Phasael in the Herodian dynasty: Phasael I (died 40 BCE), the elder brother of Herod the Great; Phasael II, his son; and Phasael III, a son of Herod the Great and father of Cypros, wife of Agrippa I.

Herod named the town of Phasaelis, established by him in the Jordan Valley north of Jericho, and the Phasaelus tower in Jerusalem after his brother Phasael.

Norris suggests that the name entered Herod's family through his mother, Cypros, a Nabataean noblewoman.

=== Nabataean princess ===
Phasa'el (Phasaelis, Phaisael), born in 5/4 BCE, was a Nabataean princess, daughter of King Aretas IV Philopatris who became the first wife of Herod Antipas, ruler of Galilee and Perea.

== See also ==
Similar theoforic names

- Shamar (given name). The Hebrew verb 'shamar' means 'to protect/save/keep'. Shmaryahu/Shemaryahu or Shmarya/Shemaryah, 'Yah has kept/guarded', is a biblical name derived from it.
- Yehoshua (Joshua in English; through Latin became 'Jesus'), Hebrew for 'Yahu is salvation".
- Yeshayahu (Isaiah in English), Hebrew for 'Yahu is salvation'.
