= Jaffa Gate =

Gate of the Old City of Jerusalem

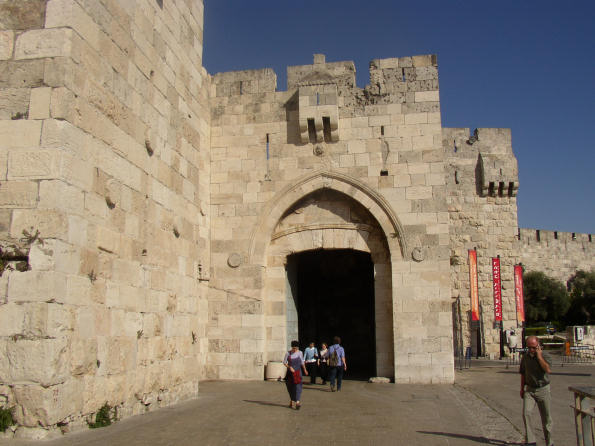
- Jaffa Gate

- Location within Old City of Jerusalem

General information
- Location: Old City (Jerusalem)
- Coordinates: 31°46′36″N 35°13′39″E

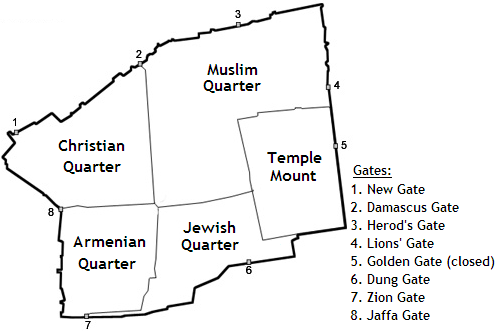
Old City Gates

Jaffa Gate (Hebrew: שער יפו, romanized: Sha'ar Yafo; Arabic: باب الخليل, romanized: Bāb al-Khalīl, "Hebron Gate") is one of the seven main open gates of the Old City of Jerusalem.

The name Jaffa Gate is currently used for both the historical Ottoman gate from 1538, and for the wide gap in the city wall adjacent to it to the south. The old gate has the layout of a medieval gate tower with an L-shaped entryway, which was secured at both ends (north and east) with heavy doors.

The breach in the wall was created in 1898 by the Ottoman authorities in order to allow German emperor Wilhelm II to enter the city triumphally. The breach and the ramp leading to it now allow cars to access the Old City from the west.

The L-shape of the historical gateway was a classical defensive measure designed to slow oncoming attackers, with its outer gate oriented in the direction of Jaffa Road, from which travellers including pilgrims arrived at the end of their journey from the port of Jaffa.

== Names ==
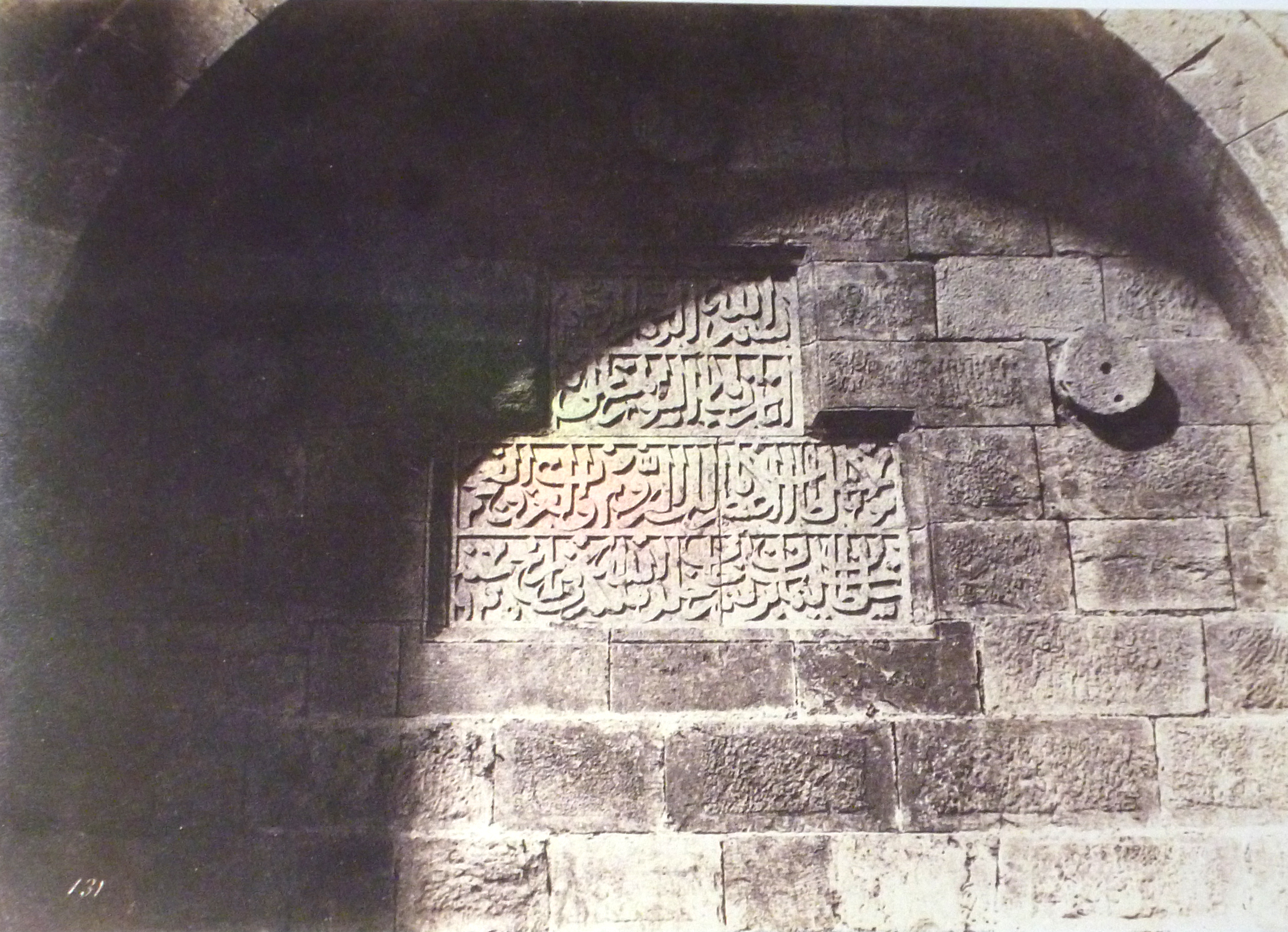
Inscription on the wall adjacent to, and north of, the outer gate, praising Allah and his servant, Ibrahim (1854 photograph)

Both the Jaffa Gate and Jaffa Road are named after the port of Jaffa, from which the Prophet Jonah embarked on his sea journey and pilgrims debarked on their trip to the Holy City. Now the name Jaffa Road is only used for the city street going through the city of Jerusalem outside the historical Old City, while the multi-lane modern road further connecting it westwards with Tel Aviv-Yafo is part of Israel Highway 1.

The Arabic name for the gate, Bab el-Khalil, literally "Gate of the Friend", refers to Abraham, "the beloved of God". Since by tradition the burial site of Ibrahim/Abraham is in Hebron, whose Arabic name is el-Khalil, so the Arabic name for the Jaffa Gate translates as "Hebron Gate". The Hebrew name Hebron derives from the term חבר haver, "friend".

In medieval times the Arabs called this gate Bab Mihrab Dawud, or "Gate of David's Chamber or Sanctuary", on the belief that the room atop the Herodian tower stump represented the "private chamber" or "prayer room" of Prophet Dawud, which is specifically mentioned in the Quran (Surah 38. Sad, Ayah 21). In Islam, King David is known as the Prophet Dawud.

The Crusaders, who rebuilt the citadel to the south of Jaffa Gate, also built a gate behind the present location of Jaffa Gate, calling it "David's Gate".

== Architecture ==
=== 1538 gate tower ===
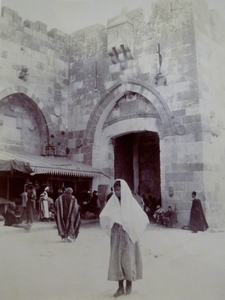
Jaffa Gate from northwest (1891)

Jaffa Gate from the eastern side (1897)

Like the stones used for the rest of the Old City walls, the stones of Jaffa Gate are large, hewn, sand-colored blocks. The entryway stands about 20 feet (6.1 meters) high, and the wall rises another 20 feet above that.

=== 1898 breach in the wall ===
Adjacent to the old gate tower (the 1538 Jaffa Gate proper, which is used only by pedestrians), is a wide breach in the wall, through which the roadway passes. This breach is located between the gate tower and the citadel/Tower of David. Photographs from circa 1870 to 1890 show that originally the city wall was continuous at that point, although the wall segment between the citadel and the gate tower was much lower, because a moat ran around the citadel, and the city wall at that point was constructed from the bottom of the moat up. Therefore, even though the overall height of that wall segment was presumably the same as the rest of the city wall's, therefore providing a similar level of protection from invaders, the top of the wall segment only reached about two metres above the moat, a much lower elevation than both the adjacent city wall and citadel. The breach was made by the Ottoman authorities ahead of Emperor Wilhelm II of Germany's visit to the city and allowed him and his retinue to comfortably enter Jerusalem riding on horses and in carriages. Part of the moat also had to be filled in for the purpose.

== Associated structures ==
=== The Citadel, aka the "Tower of David" ===
The Tower of David is an ancient citadel located near the Jaffa Gate entrance to the Old City of Jerusalem. Built to strengthen a strategically weak point in the Old City's defenses, the citadel that stands today was constructed during the 2nd century BCE and subsequently destroyed and rebuilt by, in succession, the Christian, Muslim, Mamluk, and Ottoman conquerors of Jerusalem. The strong bulwarks still seen today surrounding the base of the tower are believed to have been built by king Herod, in memorial of his brother, and was formerly named the Tower of Phasael (Hebrew: מגדל פצאל). During the Jewish war with Rome, Simon bar Giora made the tower his place of residence. Of the original tower itself, some sixteen courses of the original stone ashlars can still be seen rising from ground level, upon which were added smaller stones in a later period, which added significantly to its height. The site contains important archaeological finds dating back 2,700 years, and is a venue for benefit events, craft shows, concerts, and sound-and-light performances.

=== Ottoman clock tower ===
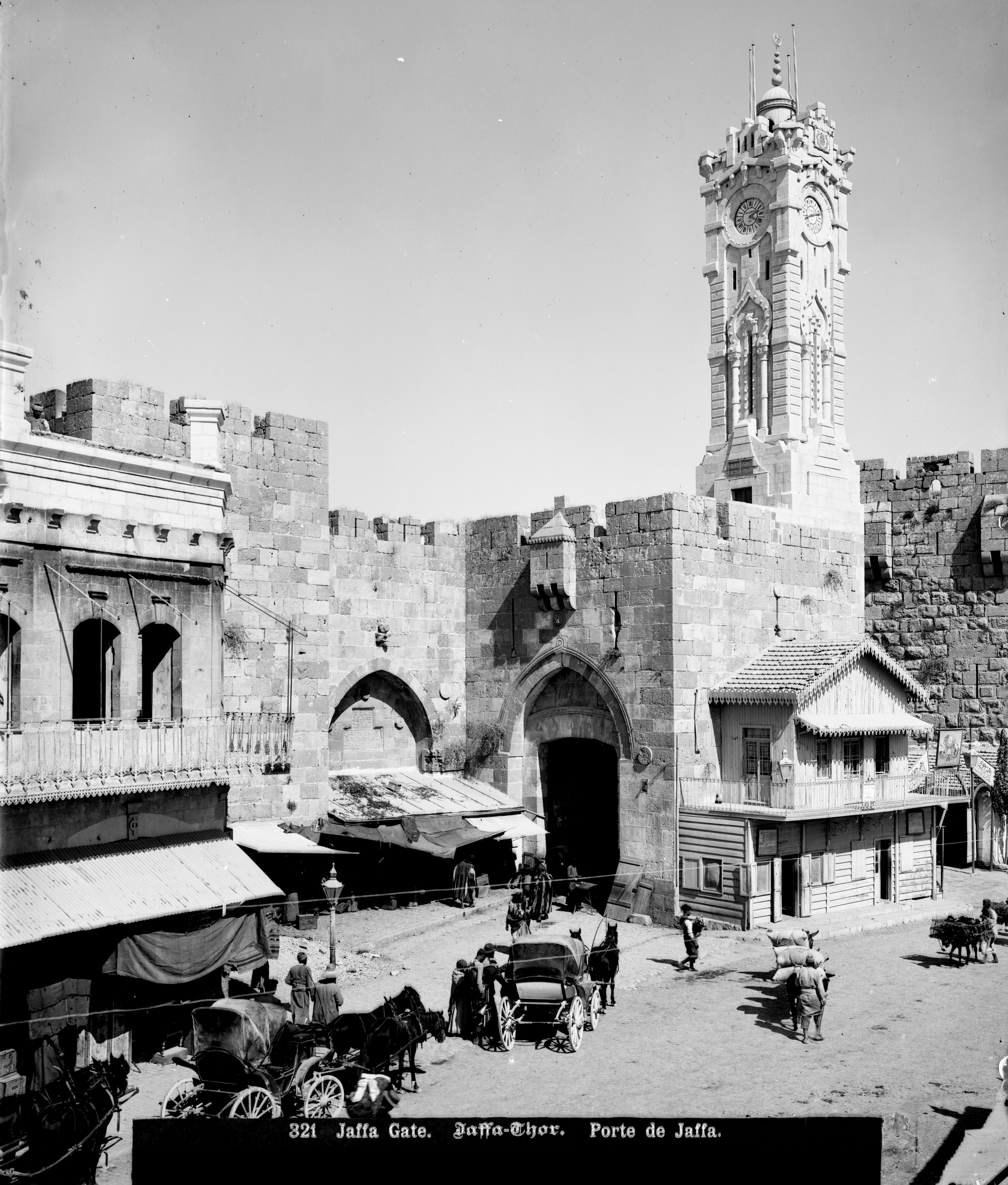
The Ottoman clock tower stood between 1908 and 1922.

In 1907 a clock was placed on the roof of the gate, and in 1908 an ornate clock tower was built on top of Jaffa Gate historical gate tower. Apart from serving the developing business district in the upper part of the Hinnom Valley, it was meant to be one of approximately one hundred such clock towers built throughout the Ottoman Empire in 1900 in celebration of the 25th year of rule of Sultan Abdul Hamid II; but because of the high cost of 20,000 francs and the poverty of the city, the money was not raised in time, and the clock tower was not completed until 1908. The clock mechanism was delivered by the famous Dent company of London, the creators of the clockwork of Big Ben.

Seven such clock towers were erected in what are now Israel and the Palestinian Territories – in Safed, Acre, Haifa, Nazareth, Nablus, Jerusalem, and Jaffa. The fact that the Jaffa Gate in Jerusalem was selected for the clock tower indicates the gate's importance at the time, even more than the Damascus Gate.

The clock tower was built of limestone quarried (a minor quarry activity) from the nearby Zedekiah's Cave. It stood 13 feet tall, and was topped by four clock faces, oriented to the cardinal compass points. The eastern and western faces showed official time (European time) while the northern and southern faces showed the local ''alaturka'' time. Above the clock faces was a bell and the crescent-and-star symbol of Ottoman rule.

The Turkish clock tower was knocked down by the British in 1922 – for aesthetic reasons, although some believe it was rather meant as a measure to push forward the Westernisation of Palestine, starting with timekeeping. The clock itself was re-erected on a modern, less decorated tower at the then-Allenby Square near the British Post Office and Town Hall; this British-built tower was itself ultimately demolished in 1934.

The British authorities attempted to recreate the historical aspect of the 16th-century city walls and gates and considered the clock tower to be an unaesthetic, disfiguring addition. As part of the same general plan, all recent buildings set against the city walls and gates were demolished as well.

=== Ottoman sebil ===
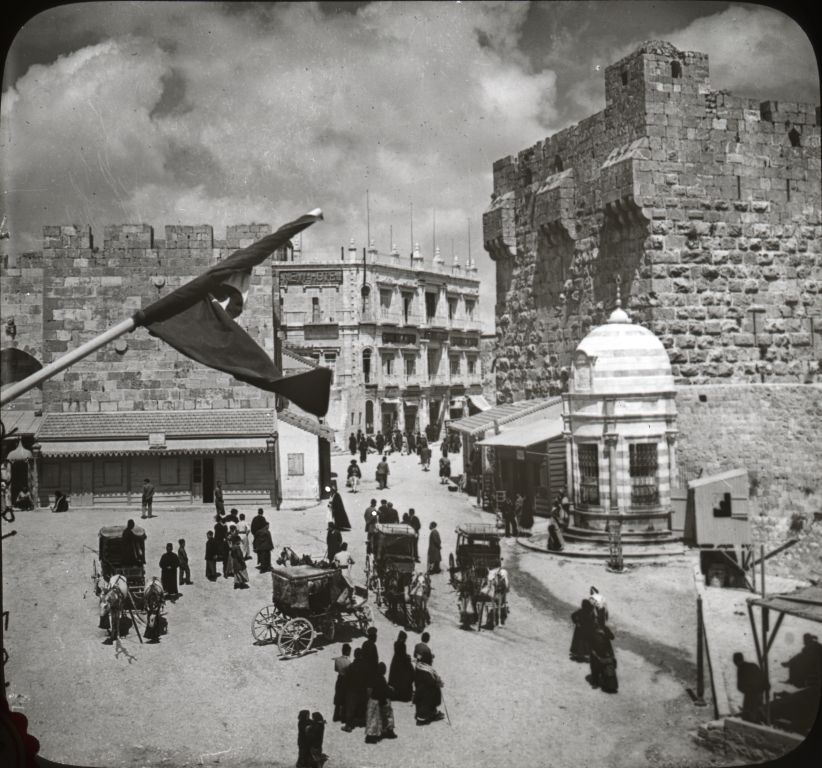
The striped round kiosk on the right housed the Ottoman sebil, or drinking fountain

Outside the 1898 breach in the city wall at Jaffa Gate, on its southern side and near the Bezalel Pavilion, was the so-called "Sultan's Sabil", built in 1900 or shortly before that. It, too, was removed in 1921 by the British authorities.

=== Bezalel Pavilion ===
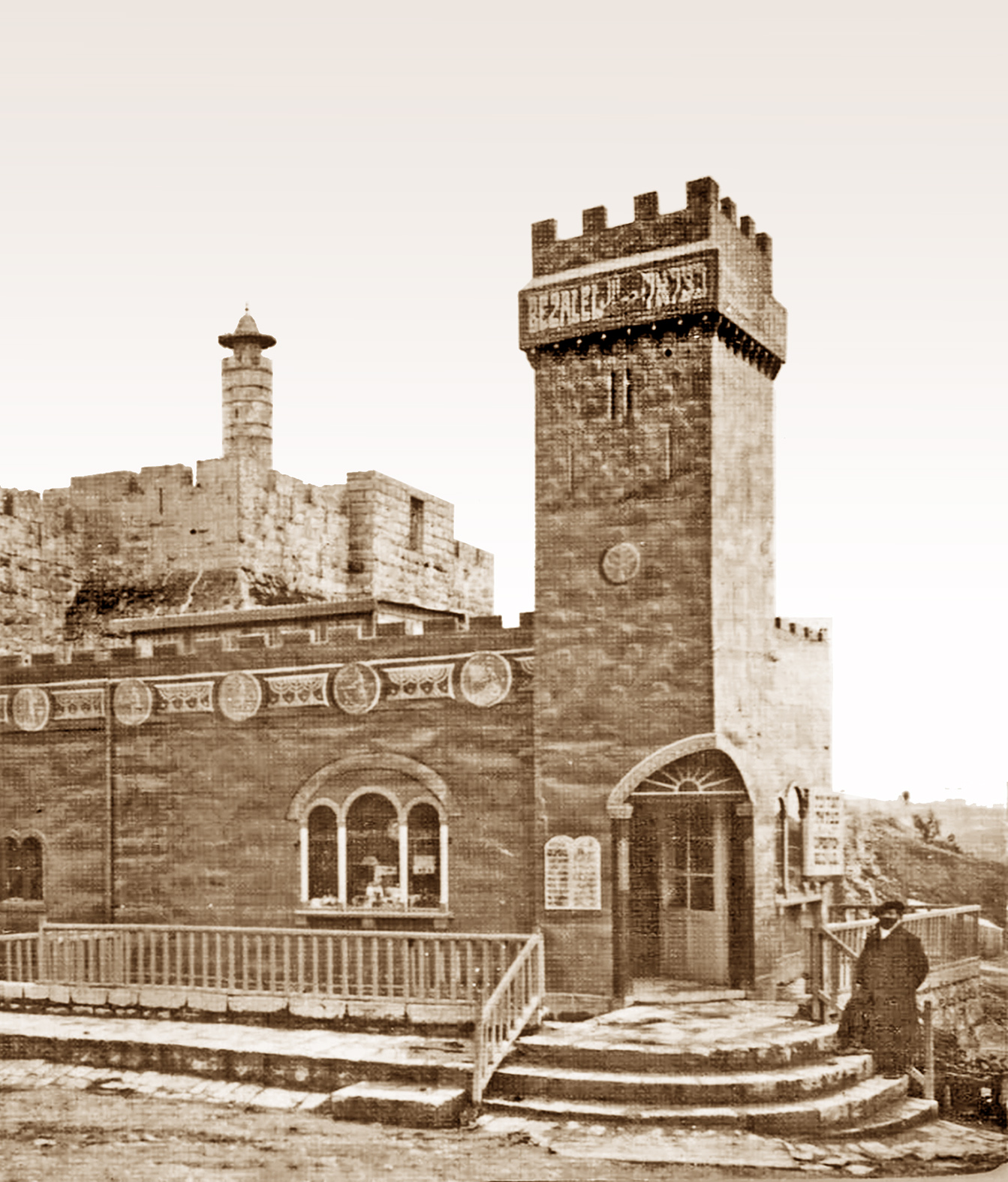
The Bezalel Pavilion near Jaffa Gate.

The Bezalel Pavilion near Jaffa Gate was a tin-plated wooden structure with a jagged roof and tower, built in 1912 as a shop and showroom of the Bezalel School of Arts. It was designed specifically for tourists and passersby on their way to and exiting the Old City. The pavilion was demolished six years after it was erected.

=== Kilometre Zero of Mandatory Palestine ===
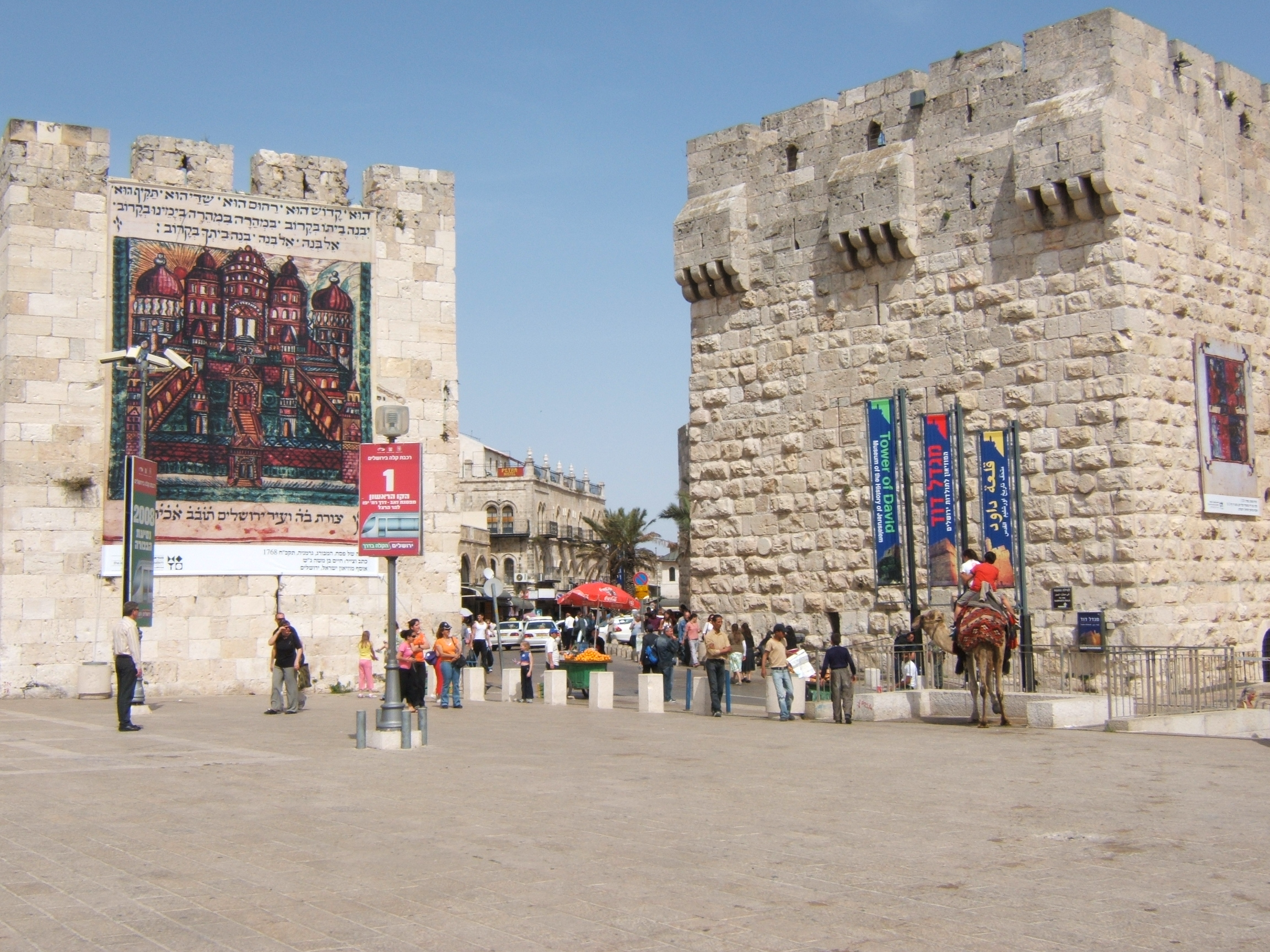
The site of Kilometre Zero, at the plaza in front of Jaffa Gate.

After the destruction of Jerusalem and the killing or enslavement of its Jewish population by the Roman Empire in 132 CE, Emperor Hadrian had the city rebuilt as a Roman city called Aelia Capitolina, and a tall pillar in the plaza inside the Damascus Gate was the starting point for measurements to other cities, as indicated in the mosaic Madaba Map. This pillar appears to have fallen or been demolished during the Byzantine period.

In the 20th century, the plaza outside the Jaffa Gate served the same purpose. During the British Mandate for Palestine, a marker outside the doorway served as the zero point for distances to and from Jerusalem. There is no such marker today.

== History ==
=== Ottoman period ===
Jaffa Gate was inaugurated in 1538 as part of the rebuilding of the Old City walls by Suleiman the Magnificent.

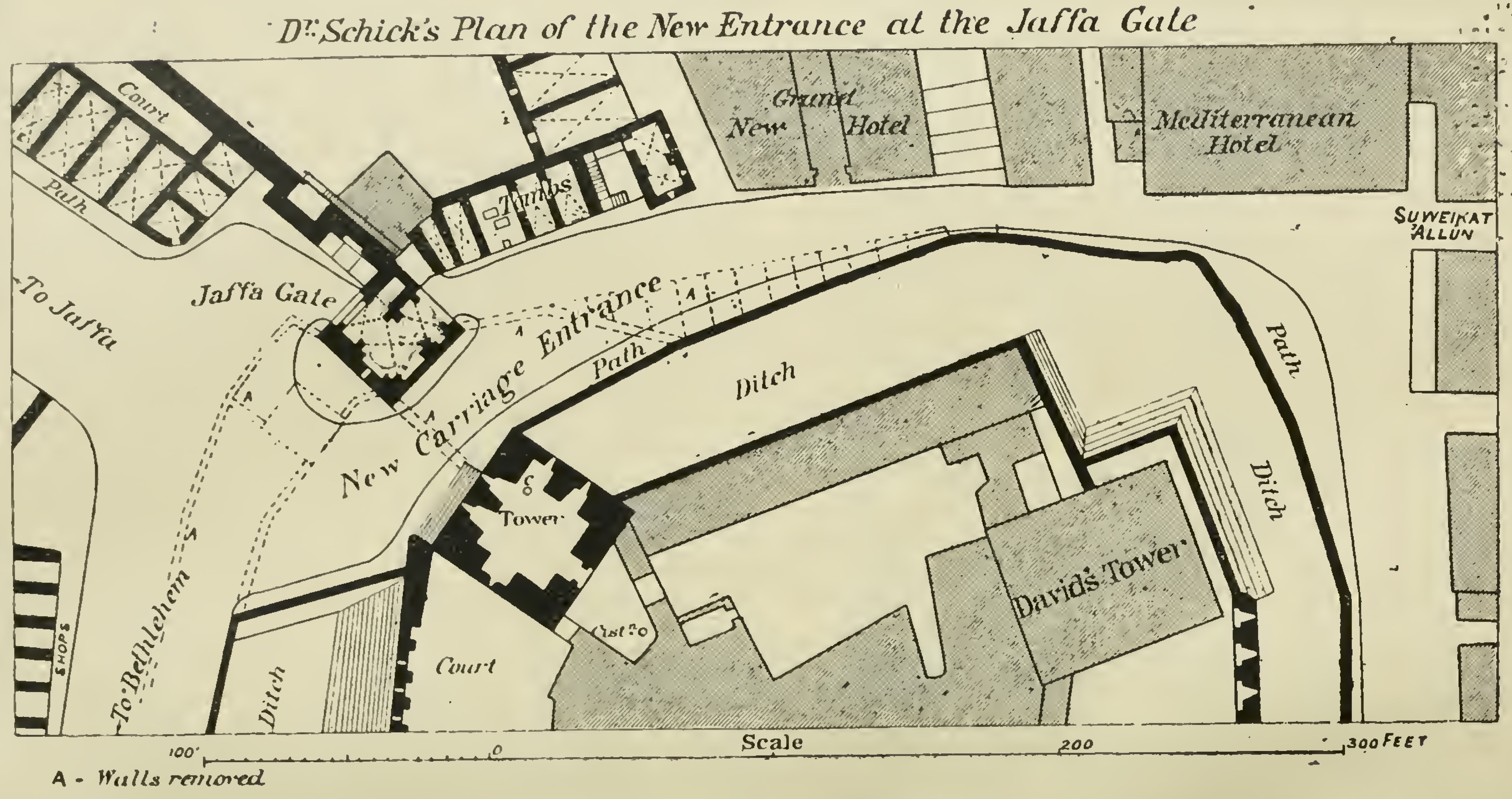
Conrad Schick's diagram of the breach in the wall of Jerusalem at Jaffa Gate made in 1898 for the visit of Kaiser Wilhelm

In 1898, a breach was made through the wall connecting the citadel with the gate tower that constituted the Jaffa Gate, ahead of German Emperor Wilhelm II's visit. Rumours have it that the Kaiser insisted on entering the city mounted on his white horse, or, according to some, in his carriage. Local legend said that Jerusalem would be ruled by a king who entered the city's gates on a white horse, so to satisfy the emperor's vanity and avoid the fate foretold by legend, a breach was made in the wall rather than allow him to ride through a gate. As the demolished wall segment was standing inside the citadel moat, a portion of the moat was filled in, creating the ramp that allowed the Emperor to access the breach and enter the city on his horse (or in his carriage). This was one of many other large projects undertaken across the Land in his honour. Contemporaneous accounts of the Emperor's entry, and the Ottoman authorities' destruction of the wall adjacent to the Jaffa Gate, were written by David Yellin, a contributor to the Hebrew-language newspaper Ha-Melitz, in his regular column titled "Letters from Jerusalem", on a number of occasions (e.g., 3 Tamuz, 5658, Hebrew equivalent of 23 June 1898; "middle of Av, 5658" – roughly end of July, 1898; and 28 Elul, 5658 – 15 September 1898).

There were voices in the French press going against this demolition. The Kaiser verbally opposed the Turkish initiative, to which the German ambassador to the Porte sent a soothing written reply to Berlin, reassuring his monarch that this was just the implementation of long-standing infrastructure plans.

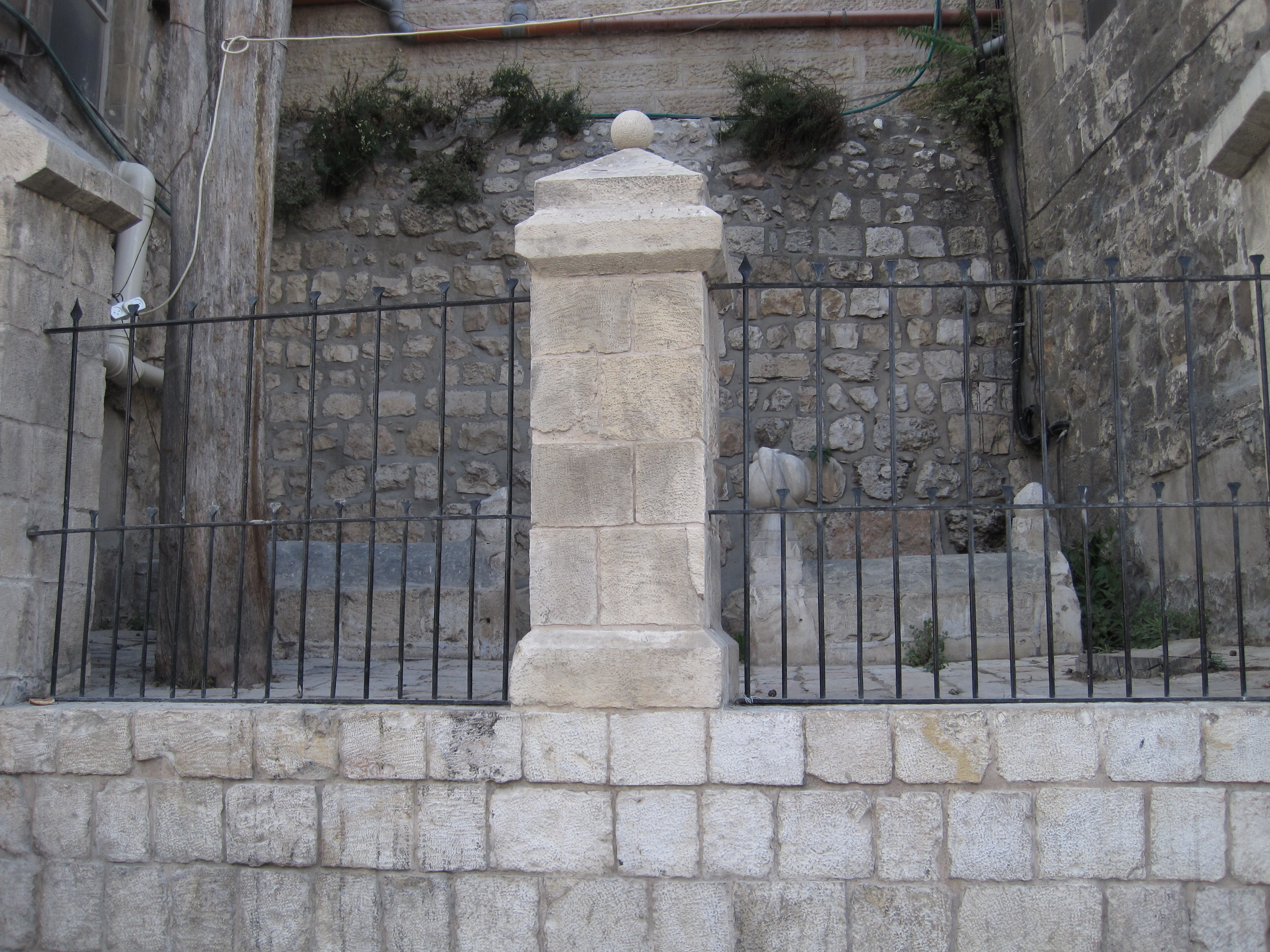
These two Ottoman tombs are attributed by a local legend to the architects of the Old City walls

Just inside the gate, behind an iron grating on the left, lie two tombs. These belong to two Ottoman-era notables, but a folk legend attributes them to the two architects whom Suleiman commissioned to construct the Old City walls. According to legend, when Suleiman saw that the architects had left Mount Zion and the tomb of King David outside of the enclosure, he ordered them executed. However, in deference to their impressive achievement, he had them buried inside the walls next to Jaffa Gate.

=== British period ===
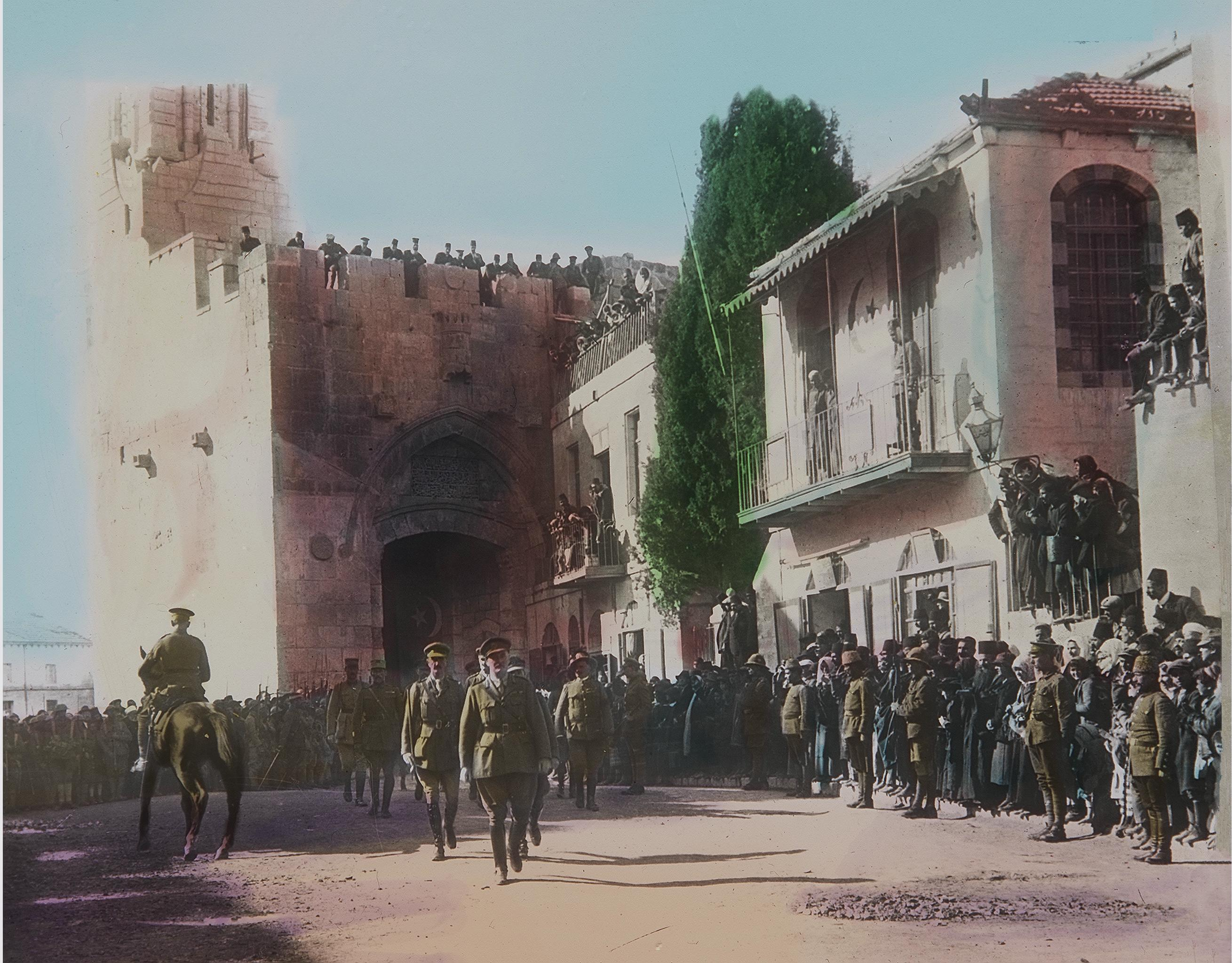
Allenby enters the Jaffa Gate on foot

In 1917, British general Edmund Allenby entered the Old City through the Jaffa Gate, giving a speech at the nearby Tower of David. Allenby entered the city on foot in a show of respect for the city and a desire to avoid comparison with the Kaiser's entry in 1898.

In 1944 the British demolished the row of houses erected against the outer face of the city wall leading down to Jaffa gate from the north, in an attempt to preserve Jerusalem's historic vistas.

=== Since 1948 ===
During the 1948 Arab–Israeli War, Israeli forces fought hard to connect the Jewish Quarter of the Old City with Israeli-held western Jerusalem by controlling the Jaffa Gate. Israeli forces were not able to gain control of the gate until the Six-Day War in 1967.

In 2000, Pope John Paul II came through Jaffa Gate to the Old City during his visit in Israel in the Holy Year.

== Location within the Old City ==
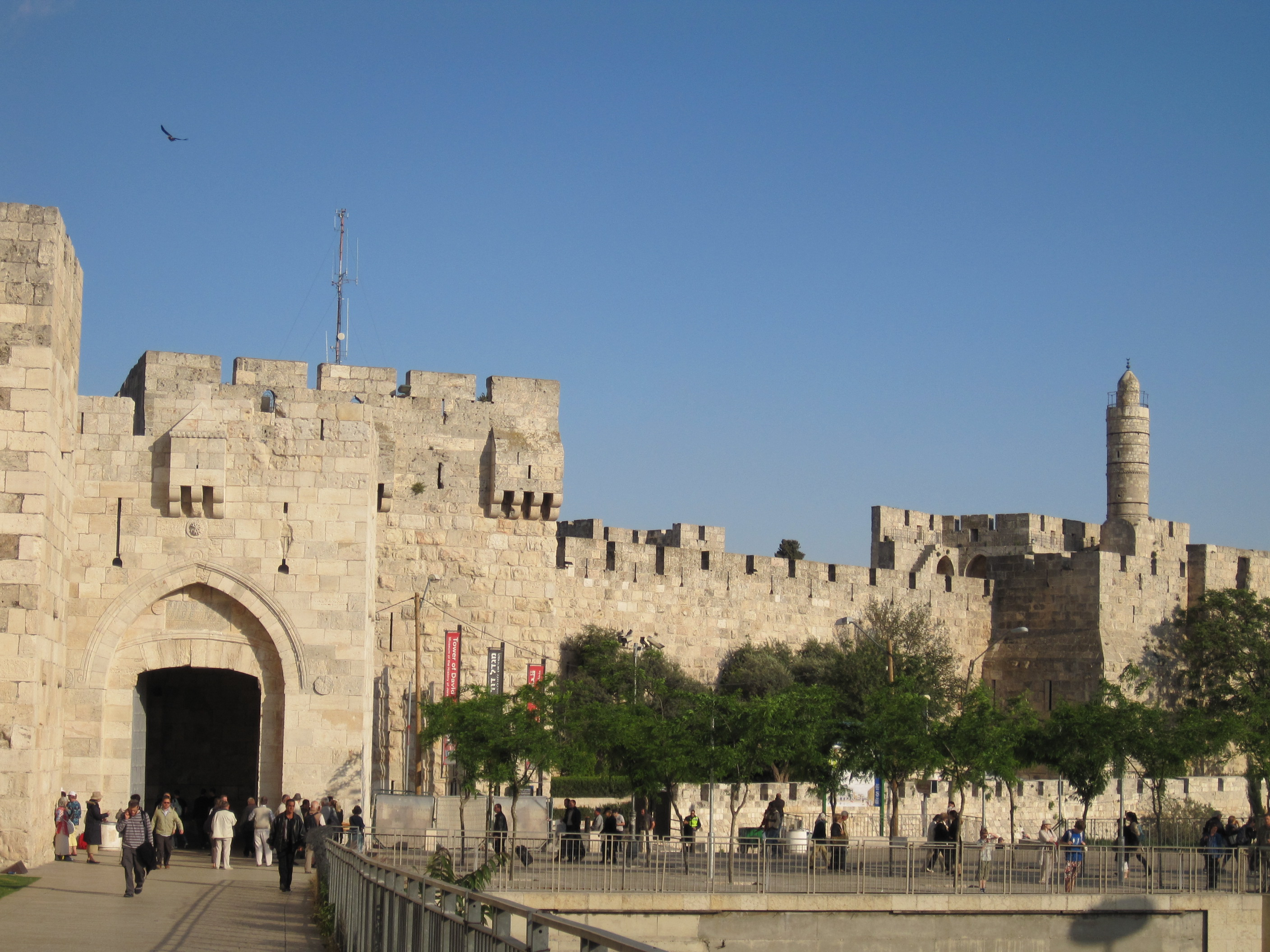
View of Jaffa Gate (left) and the Tower of David (right).

Inside Jaffa Gate is a small square with entrances to the Christian Quarter (on the left), Muslim Quarter (straight ahead) and the Armenian Quarter (to the right, past the Tower of David). A tourist information office and shops line the square. The entrance to the Muslim Quarter is part of the suq (marketplace).

== Topography ==
The gate's location is determined by the city's topography. It stands at the point where the valley followed by Jaffa Road meets the city wall at the upper end of the Transversal Valley, which bisects the Old City in a roughly west–east direction, between the northwest ridge and the southwest hill known as Mount Zion. Inside the city, there are two streets today that follow the Transversal Valley eastward, down into the Central or Tyropoeon Valley and end at the Temple Mount: David Street, continued by the Street of the Chain. The Transversal Valley with the two streets separates the city into a northern and a southern half, with the Christian and Muslim Quarters to the north, and Armenian and Jewish Quarters to the south.

== Renovation ==
Inside Jaffa Gate (video).

Jaffa Gate is heavily used by pedestrians and vehicles alike. In the early 2000s (decade), the road straddling the gate was moved further west and a plaza constructed in its stead to connect Jaffa Gate with the soon-to-be-built Mamilla shopping mall across the street.

In 2010, the Israel Antiquities Authority completed a two-month restoration and cleaning of Jaffa Gate as part of a $4 million project begun in 2007 to renovate the length of the Old City walls. The clean-up included replacing broken stones, cleaning the walls of decades of car exhaust, and reattaching an elaborate Arabic inscription erected at the gate's original dedication in 1593. Bullet fragments in the gate, from fighting in the 1948 Arab–Israeli war, were preserved. Infrastructure work beside Jaffa Gate also uncovered an ancient aqueduct dating from the 2nd or 3rd century AD.

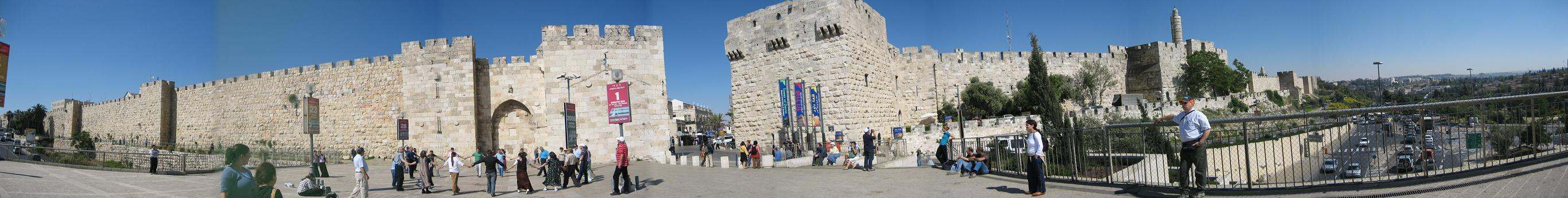
A panoramic view of the modern Gate's plaza. Note the gap in the walls, created for Kaiser Wilhelm's visit in 1898, now used for vehicular access to the Old City.
