= Tower of David =

Ancient citadel in the Old City of Jerusalem

- Hebrew: מגדל דוד, romanized: Migdál Davíd
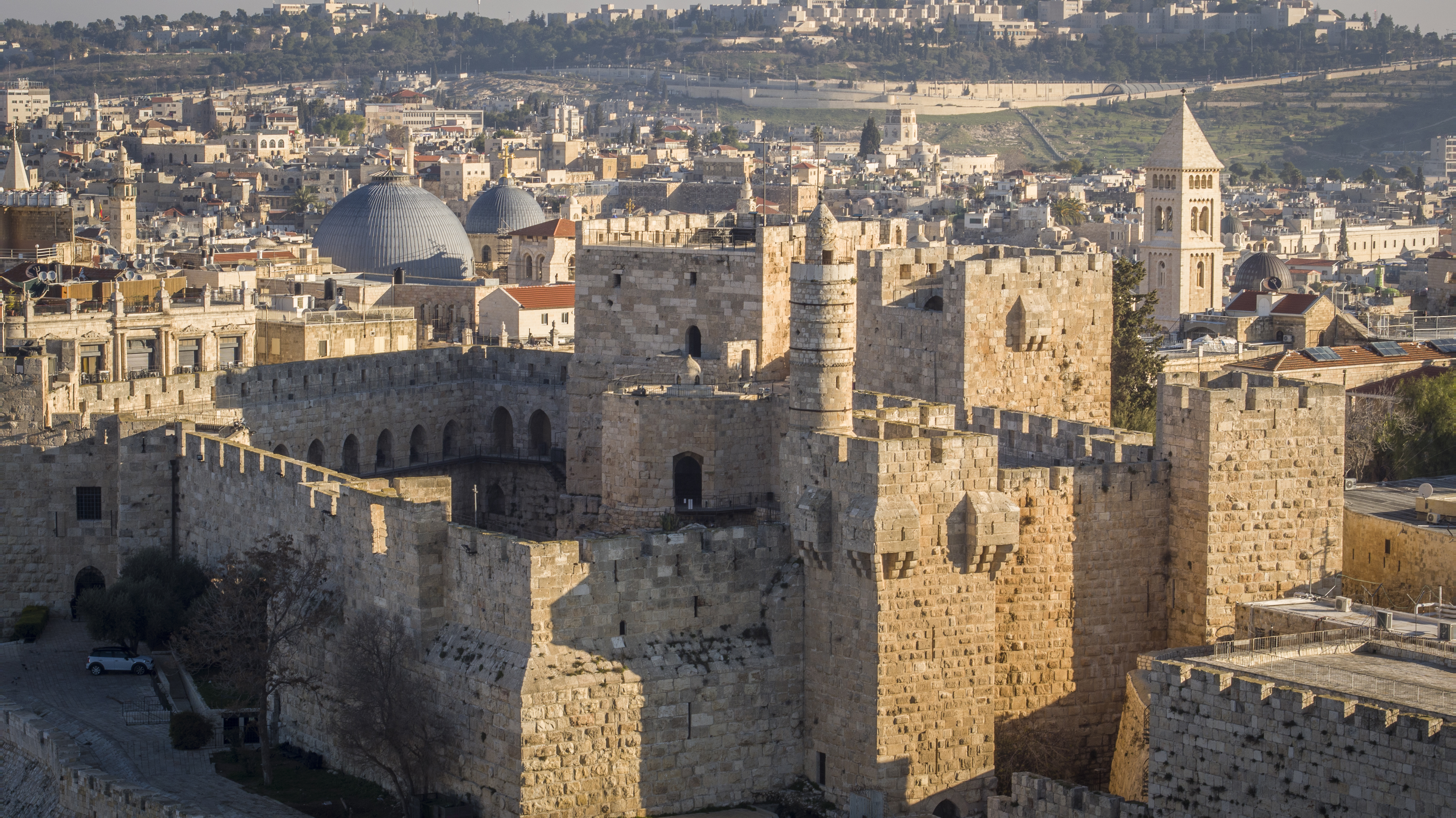
- The citadel in 2016
- Alternative names: The Citadel; Arabic: القلعة, romanized: al-Qalʿa

General information
- Location: Old City of Jerusalem, near the Jaffa Gate
- Coordinates: 31°46′34″N 35°13′40″E
- Current tenants: Tower of David Museum of the History of Jerusalem
- Completed: Present structure: Mamluk and Ottoman periods
- Renovated: Rebuilt 1310; expanded 1537–1541

The Tower of David (Hebrew: מגדל דוד, romanized: Migdál Davíd), also known as the Citadel (Arabic: القلعة, romanized: al-Qalʿa), is an ancient citadel and contemporary museum, located near the Jaffa Gate entrance to the Old City of Jerusalem.

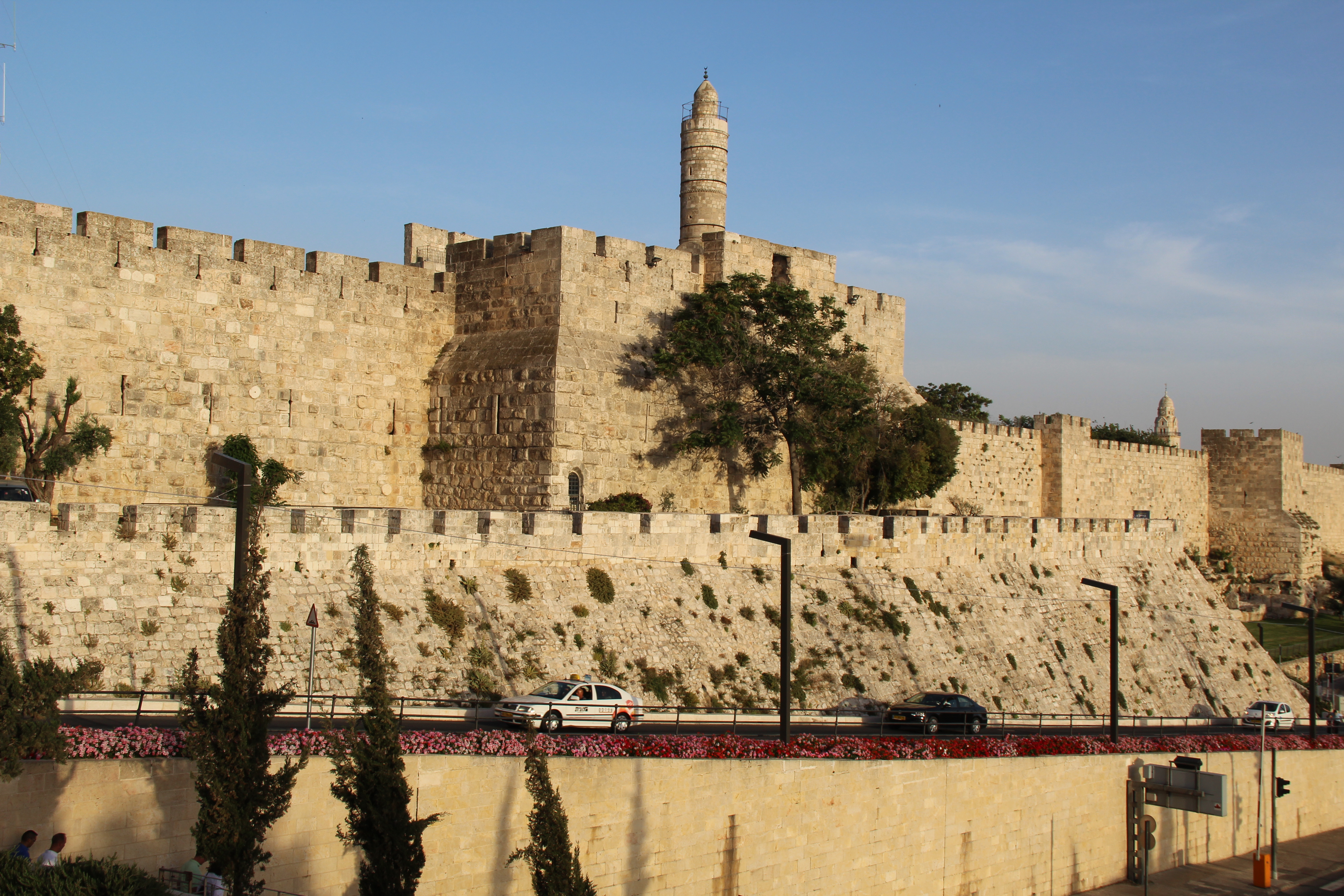
The Tower of David and the city wall (2014)

The citadel that stands today dates to the Mamluk and Ottoman periods. It was built on the site of a series of earlier ancient fortifications of the Hasmonean, Herodian, Byzantine and Early Muslim periods, after being destroyed repeatedly during the last decades of Crusader presence in the Holy Land by their Muslim enemies. It is a venue for benefit events, craft shows, concerts, and sound-and-light performances.

Dan Bahat, an Israeli archaeologist, writes that the original three Hasmonean towers standing in this area of the city were altered by Herod, and that "the northeastern tower was replaced by a much larger, more massive tower, dubbed the 'Tower of David' beginning in the 5th century CE." Originally referring to the Herodian tower in the northeast of the citadel, in the 19th century the name Tower of David also began to refer to the 17th-century minaret at the opposite side of the citadel, and since 1967 officially refers to the entire citadel.

The Tower of David hosted several art exhibitions in the 1920s in a period dubbed by some the Tower of David Period in Israeli art.

== Names ==
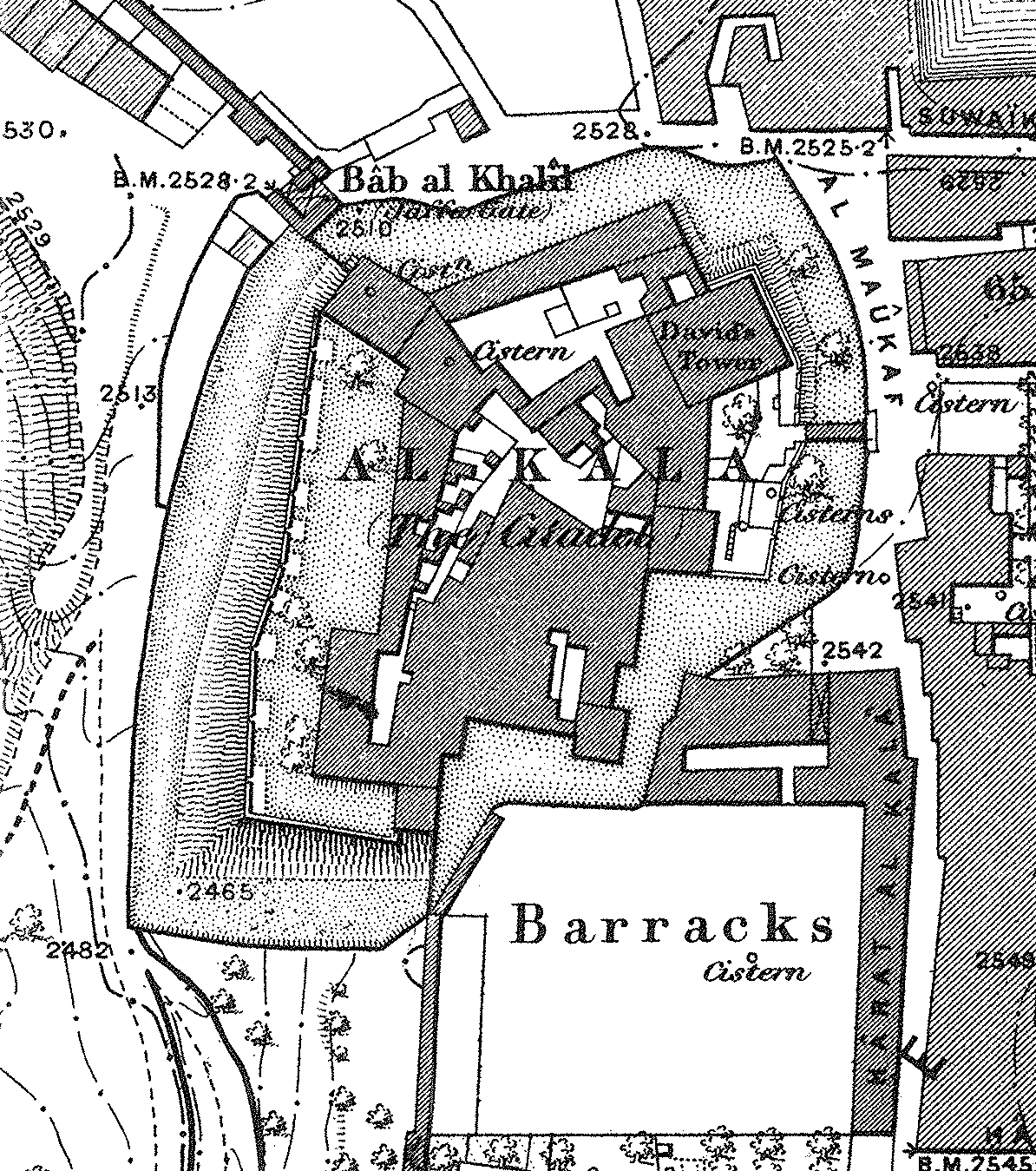
1865 Ordnance Survey of Jerusalem

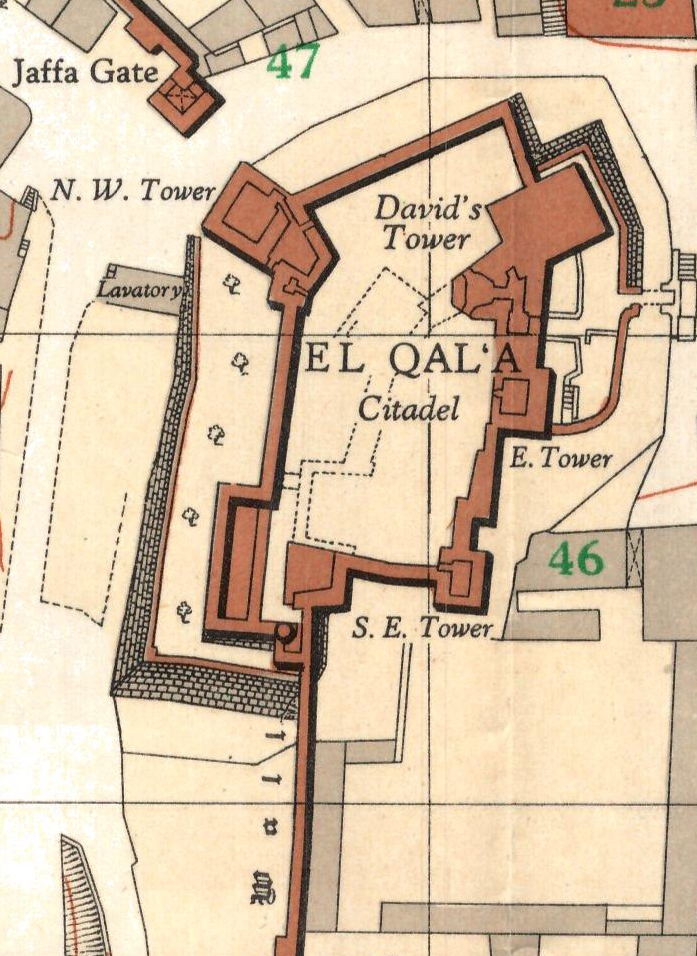
1936 Survey of Palestine

The citadel with the label "David's Tower" referring to the northeast tower in maps from 1865 and 1936. The label "Tower of David" is now also commonly used to refer to the Ottoman minaret on the south west side of the citadel (shown as a small red circle on the 1936 map).

=== Tower of David: Herodian tower ===
The name Tower of David was first used for the Herodian tower in the 5th century CE by the Byzantine Christians, who believed the site to be the palace of King David. They borrowed the name Tower of David from the Song of Songs, attributed to Solomon, King David's son, who wrote: "Thy neck is like the tower of David builded for an armoury, whereon there hang a thousand bucklers, all shields of mighty men" (Song of Songs, 4:4).

=== Arabic names ===
An Arabic name of the massive Mamluk northeast tower is the Burj al-Qalʾa (برج القلعة, 'Citadel Tower').

During the Early Muslim and Ayyubid periods it was known in Arabic as Miḥrāb Dāwūd, lit. 'David's miḥrāb (prayer place)'. Note that there is also another mihrab called Miḥrāb Dāwūd, built into the inner side of the Southern Wall of the Haram esh-Sharif/Temple Mount.

== History ==
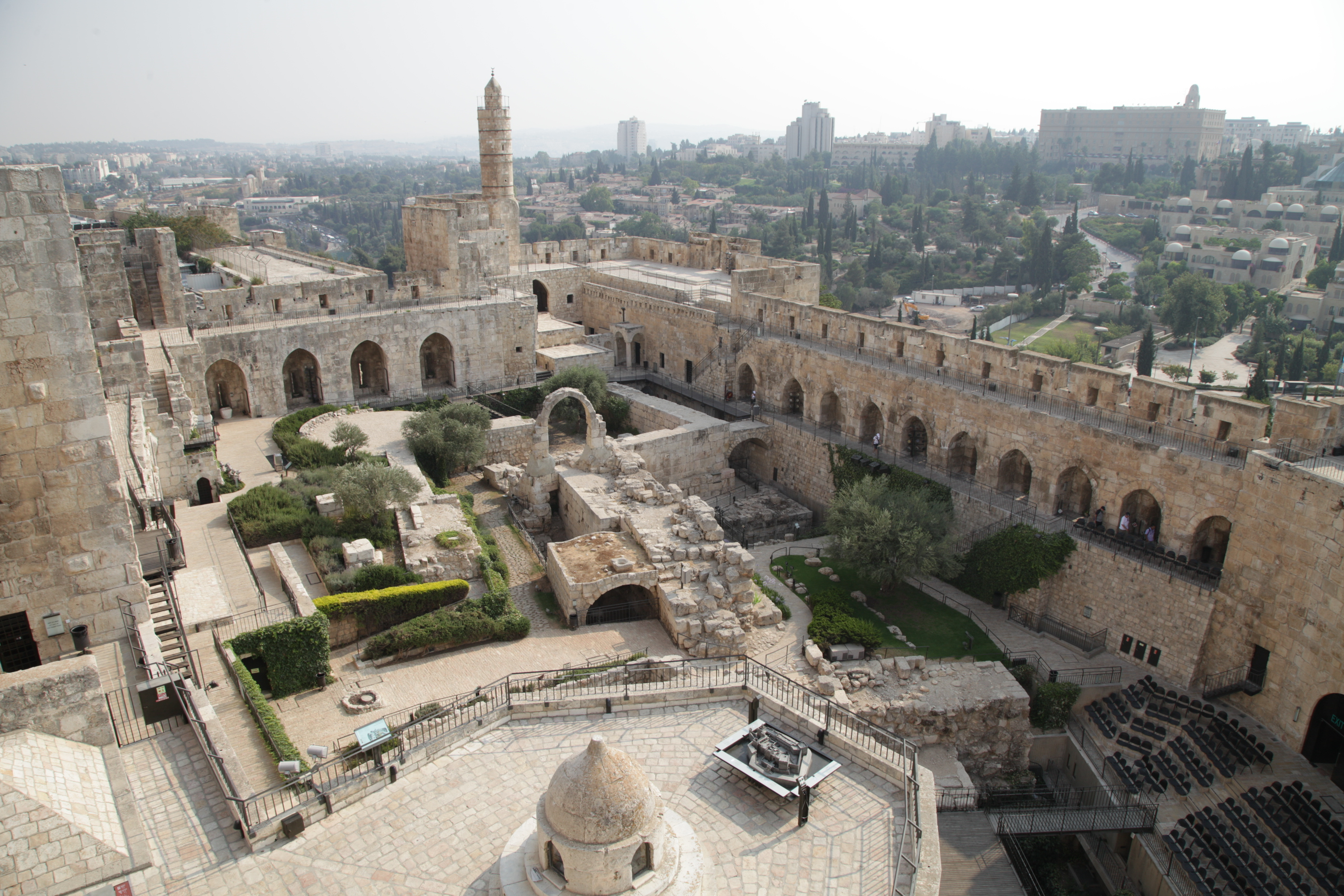
View of Tower of David from above

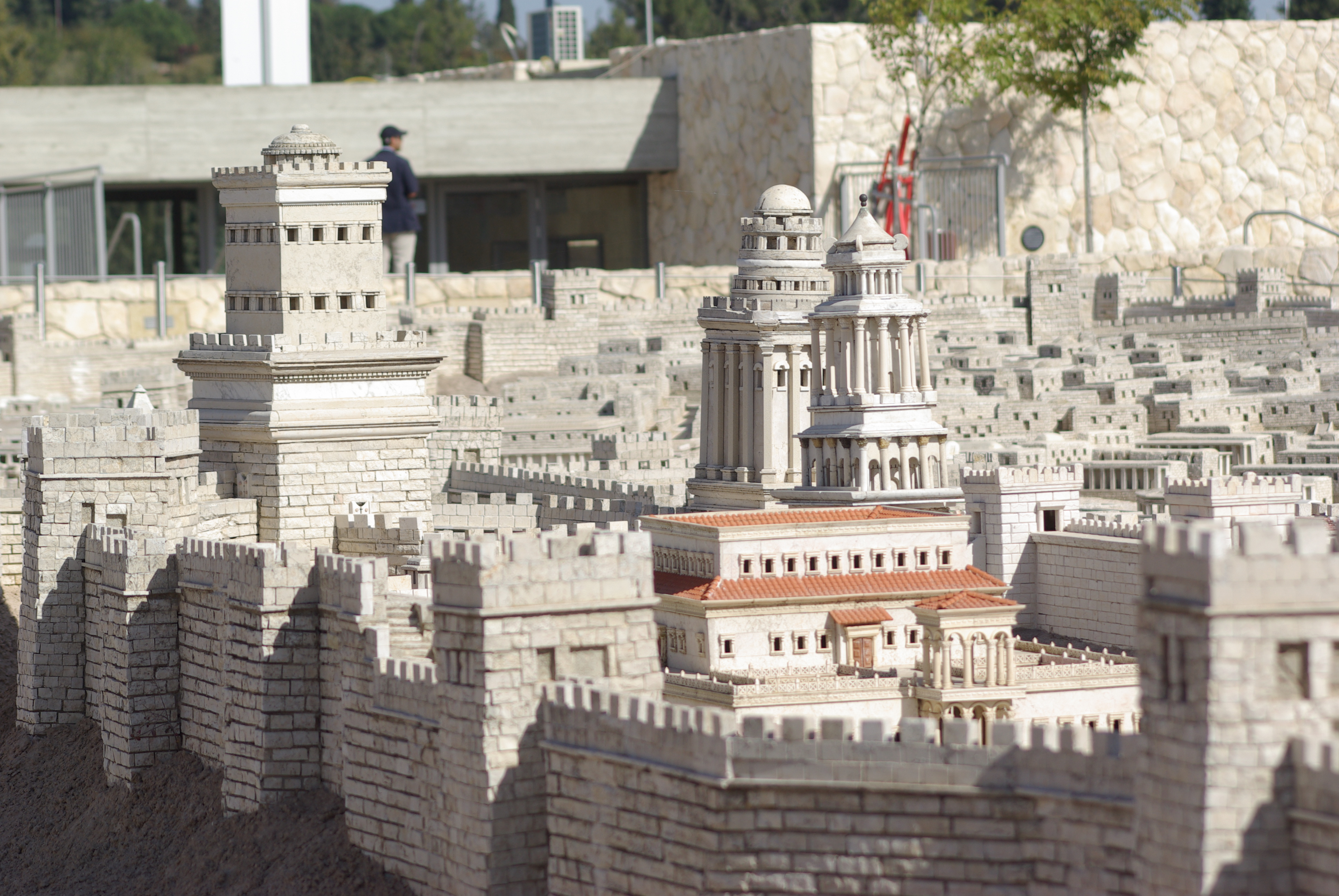
Jerusalem Model, Palace of Herod the Great with the three towers (Phasael, Hippicus, Mariamne from left to right)

=== Hasmonean period ===
During the 2nd century BCE, the Old City of Jerusalem expanded further onto the so-called Western Hill. This 773-metre (2,536 ft) high prominence, which comprises the modern Armenian and Jewish Quarters as well as Mount Zion, was bounded by steep valleys on all sides except for the north. The first settlement in this area was about 150 BCE, around the time of the Hasmonean kings, when what Josephus Flavius called "the First Wall" was constructed.

=== Herod's towers ===
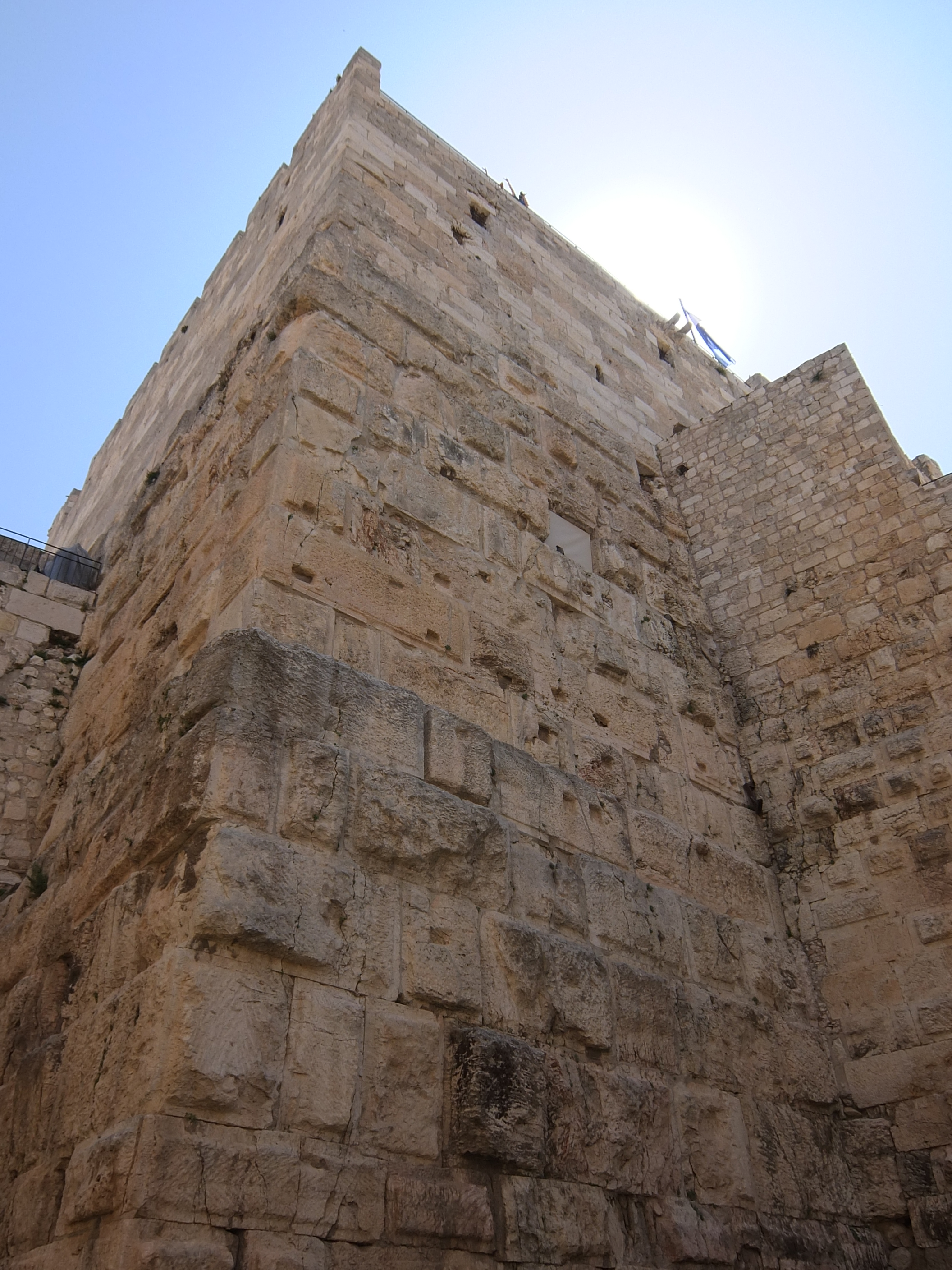
Large Herodian ashlars topped by smaller Mamluk stones

Herod, who wrested power from the Hasmonean dynasty, added three massive towers to the fortifications in 37–34 BCE. He built these at the vulnerable northwest corner of the Western Hill, where the citadel is now located. His purpose was not only to defend the city, but to safeguard his own royal palace located nearby on Mount Zion. Herod named the tallest of the towers, 44 metres (144 ft) in height, Phasael, in memory of his brother who had committed suicide while in captivity. Another tower was called Mariamne, named for his second wife whom he had executed and buried in a cave to the west of the tower. He named the third tower Hippicus after one of his friends. Of the three towers, only the base of one of them survives today—either the Phasael or, as argued by archaeologist Hillel Geva who excavated the citadel, the Hippicus Tower. Of the original tower itself (now called the Tower of David), some 16 courses of the Herodian stone ashlars still rise from ground level (partially hidden by a much later built glacis), upon which were added smaller stones in a later period, that added back significantly to the height of the remaining stump of the Herodian tower.

During the Jewish war with Rome, Simon bar Giora made the tower his place of residence. Following the destruction of Jerusalem by the Romans in 70 CE, the three towers were preserved as a testimony of the might of the fortifications overcome by the Roman legions, and the site served as barracks for the Roman troops.

When the Roman Empire adopted Christianity as its favoured religion in the 4th century, a community of monks established itself in the citadel. It was during the Byzantine period that the remaining Herodian tower, and by extension the citadel as a whole, acquired its alternative name—the Tower of David—after the Byzantines, mistakenly identifying the hill as Mount Zion, presumed it to be David's palace mentioned in 2 Samuel.

=== Early Muslims, Crusaders, Ayyubids ===
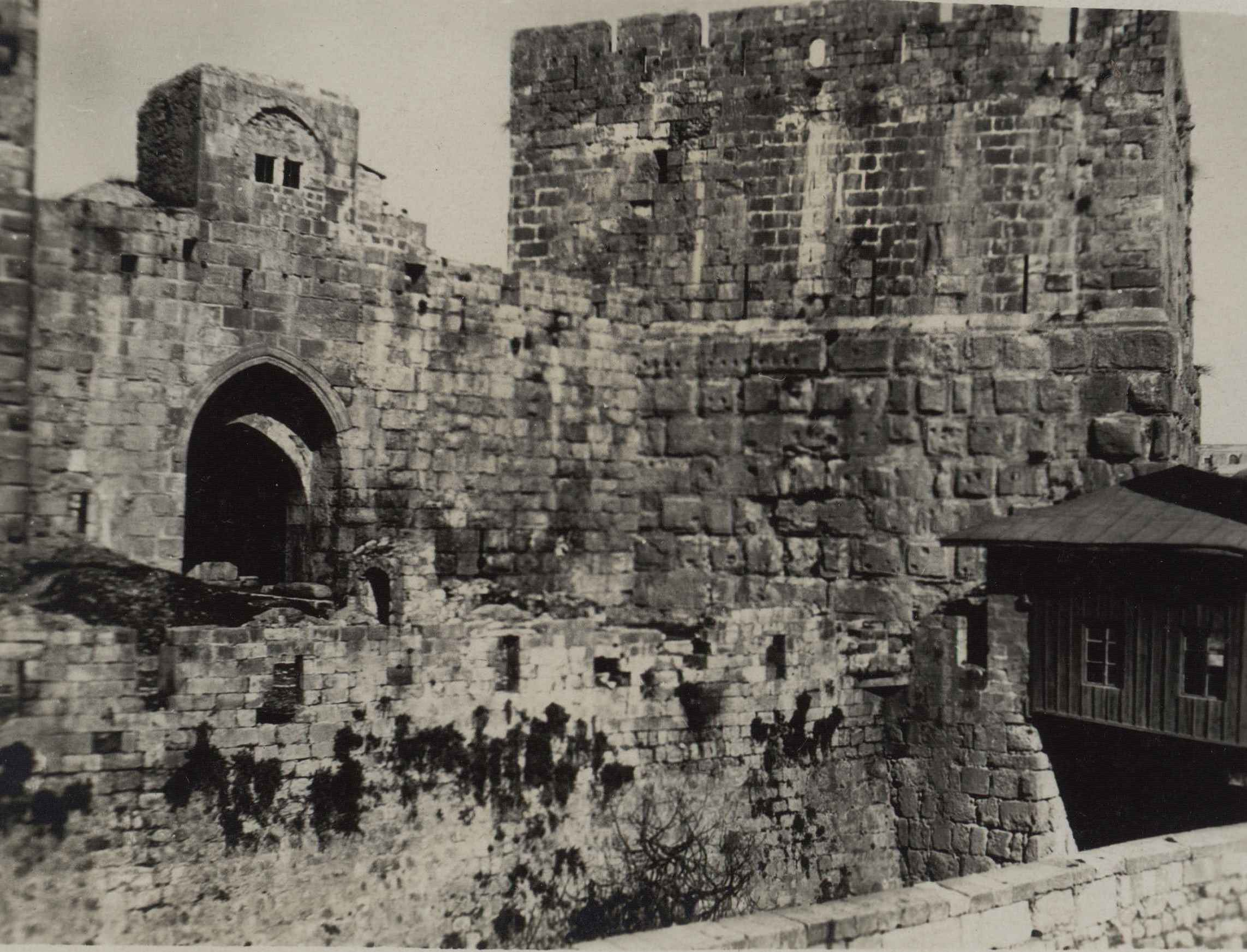
The moat, main gate and tower in 1911

After the Siege of Jerusalem (636–637), the new Muslim rulers refurbished the citadel. This powerful structure withstood the assault of the First Crusade in 1099, and surrendered only when its defenders were guaranteed safe passage out of the city.

During the Crusader period, thousands of pilgrims undertook the pilgrimage to Jerusalem by way of the port at Jaffa. To protect pilgrims from the menace of highway robbers, the Crusaders built a tower surrounded by a moat atop the citadel, and posted lookouts to guard the road to Jaffa. The citadel also protected the newly erected palace of the Crusader kings of Jerusalem, located immediately south of the citadel.

Approximately two hundred Jews lived near the Tower of David in 1173, according to Benjamin of Tudela.

In 1187, Sultan Saladin captured the city including the citadel. In 1239, the Ayyubid emir of Karak, An-Nasir Dawud, attacked the Crusader garrison and destroyed the citadel. In their 1244 siege of the city, the Khwarazmians defeated and banished the Crusaders from Jerusalem for a last time, destroying the entire city in the process. The Mamluk Sultanate destroyed the citadel in 1260.

=== Mamluk and Ottoman citadel ===
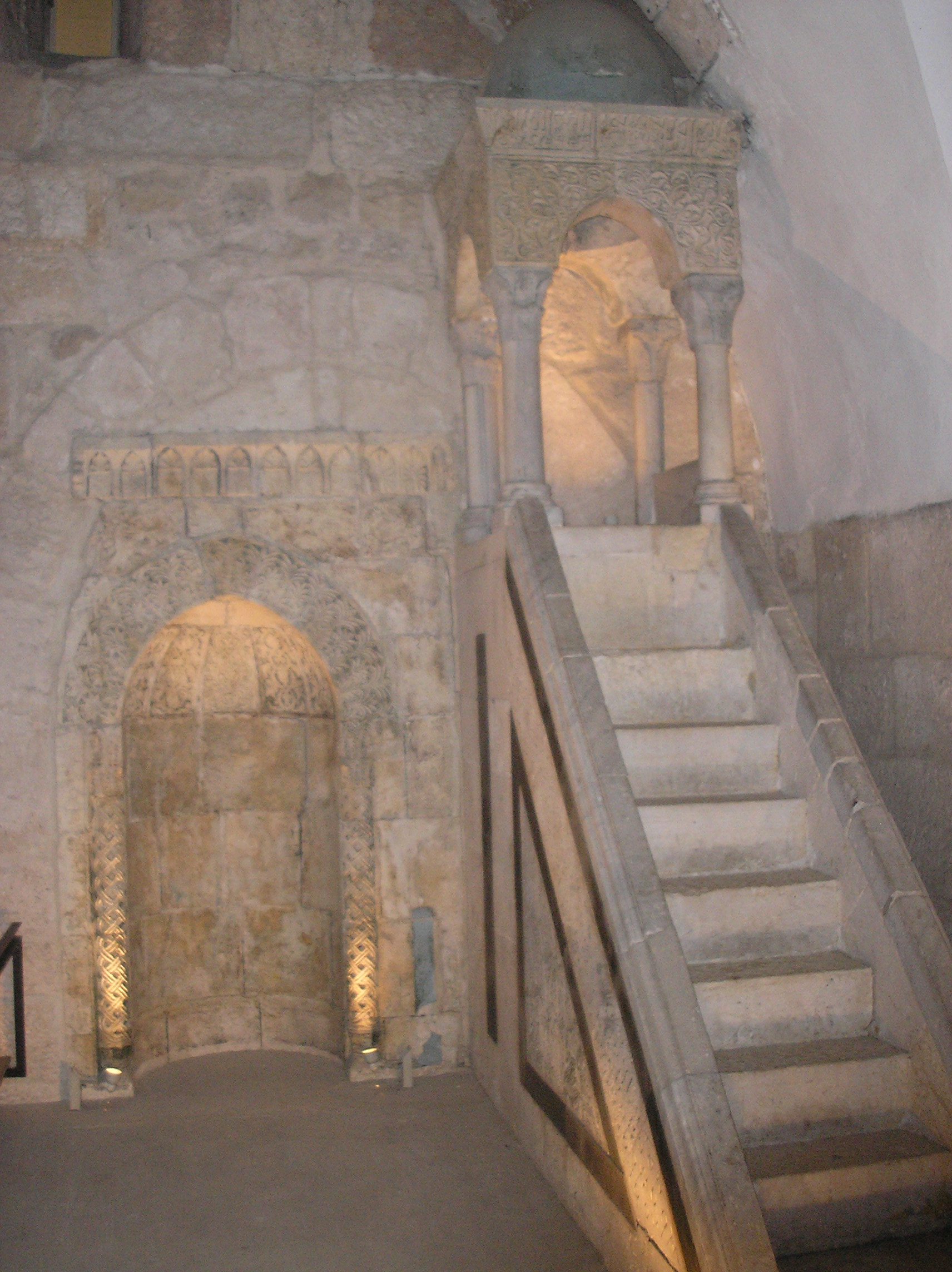
Masjid Mihrab ed-Dawood, the Ottoman "David's Prayer Niche Mosque", mihrab and minbar

In 1310 the citadel was rebuilt by Mamluk sultan Al-Nasir Muhammad ibn Qalawun, who gave it much of its present shape.

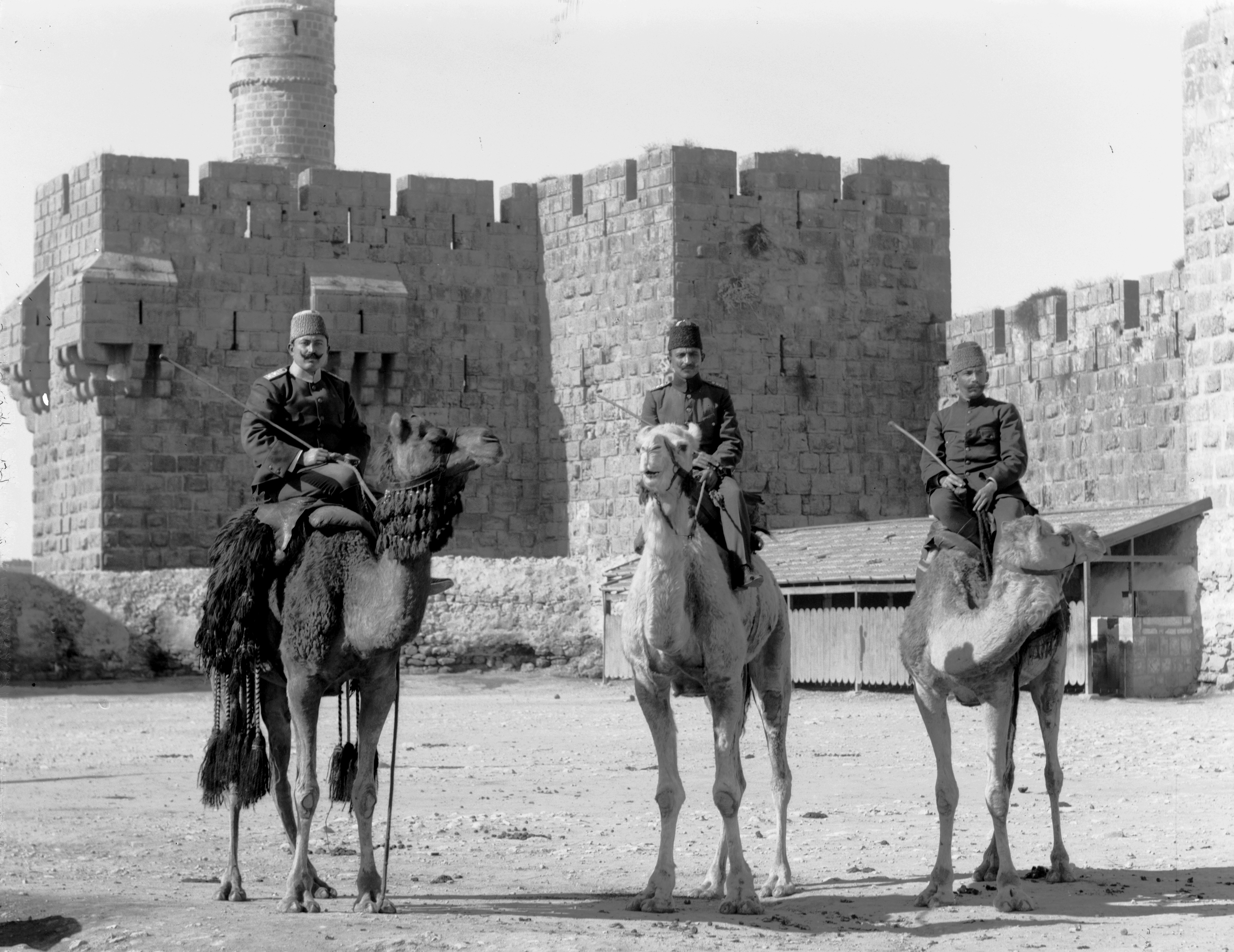
3 Ottoman officers on camels before Tower of David, between 1898 and 1917

The citadel was expanded between 1537 and 1541 by the Ottoman sultan Suleiman the Magnificent, whose architects designed a large entrance, behind which stood a cannon emplacement. For 400 years, the citadel served as a garrison for Turkish troops. The Ottomans also installed a mosque near the southwest corner of the citadel commonly known as the Mihrab el-Qal'a ed-Dawood ('Prayer niche of David's fortress'), erecting a minaret during the years 1635–1655. In the 19th century the conspicuous minaret, which still stands today, became commonly referred to as the Tower of David. At least two mosques are known to exist within the citadel.

During World War I, British forces under General Edmund Allenby successfully captured Jerusalem. Allenby formally proclaimed the event standing on a platform at the outer eastern gate of the citadel.

=== British and Jordanian periods ===
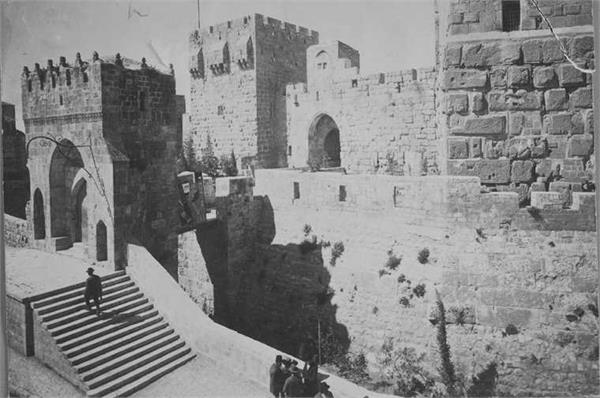
Main gate to citadel, 1920

During the period of British rule (1917–1948), the High Commissioner for Palestine established the Pro-Jerusalem Society to protect the city's cultural heritage. This organisation cleaned and renovated the citadel and reopened it to the public as a venue for concerts, benefit events and exhibitions by local artists. In the 1930s, a museum of Palestinian folklore was opened in the citadel, displaying traditional crafts and clothing.

Following the 1948 Arab–Israeli War, the Arab Legion captured Jerusalem and converted the citadel back to its historical role as a military position, as it commanded a dominant view across the armistice line into Jewish Jerusalem. It would keep this role until 1967.

== Tower of David Museum ==
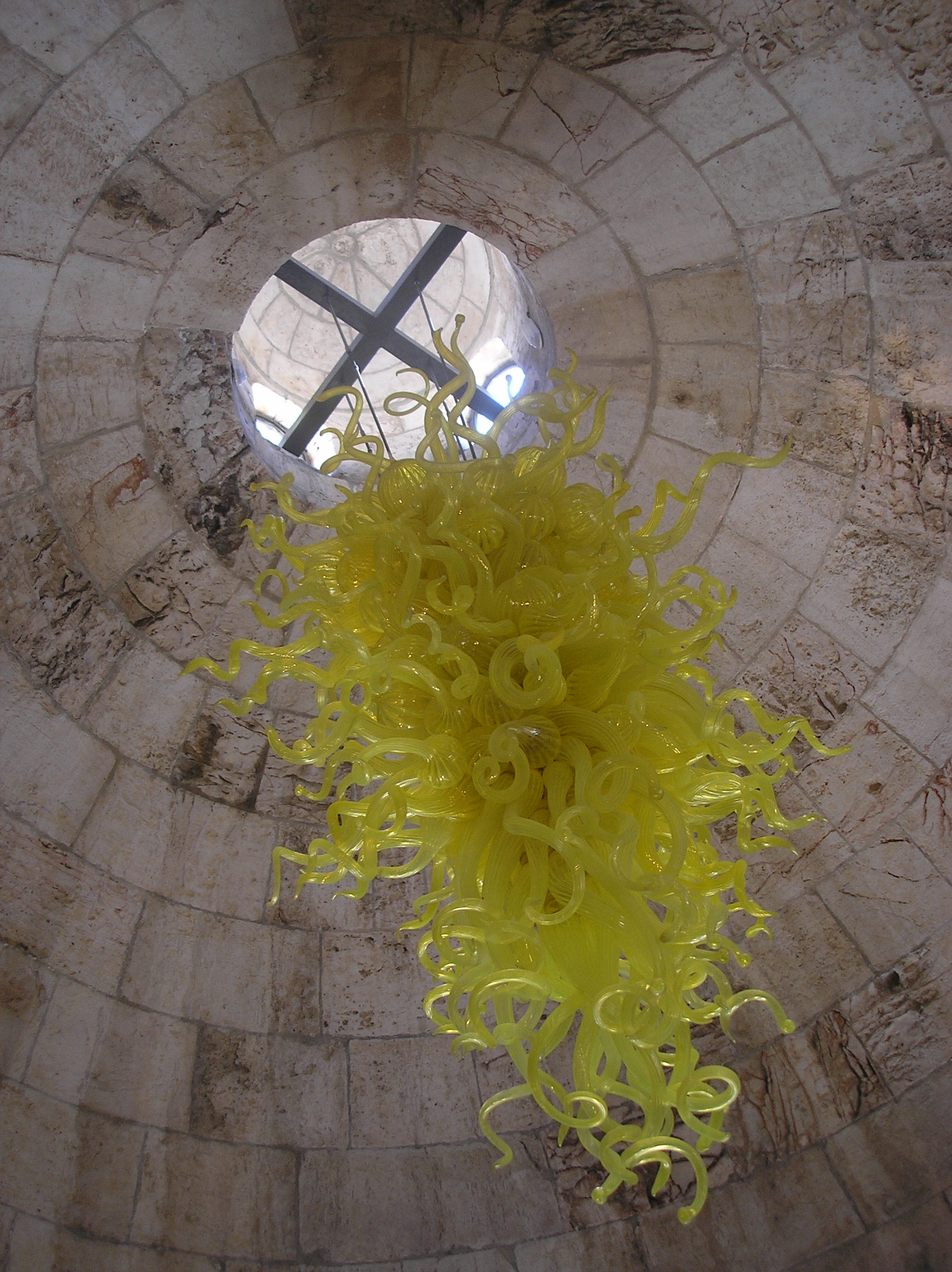
A Dale Chihuly chandelier hangs in the entrance hall of the Tower of David Museum

Since the Six-Day War in 1967, the citadel's cultural role was revived.

The Tower of David Museum of the History of Jerusalem was opened in 1989 by the Jerusalem Foundation. Located in a series of chambers in the original citadel, the museum includes a courtyard which contains archeological remains dating back 2,700 years.

The exhibits depict 4,000 years of Jerusalem's history, from its beginnings as a Canaanite city to modern times. Using maps, videos, holograms, drawings and models, the exhibit rooms each depict Jerusalem under its various rulers. Visitors may also ascend to the ramparts, which command a 360-degree view of the Old City and New City of Jerusalem.

As of 2002, the Jerusalem Foundation reported that over 3.5 million visitors had toured the museum.

== Archaeology ==
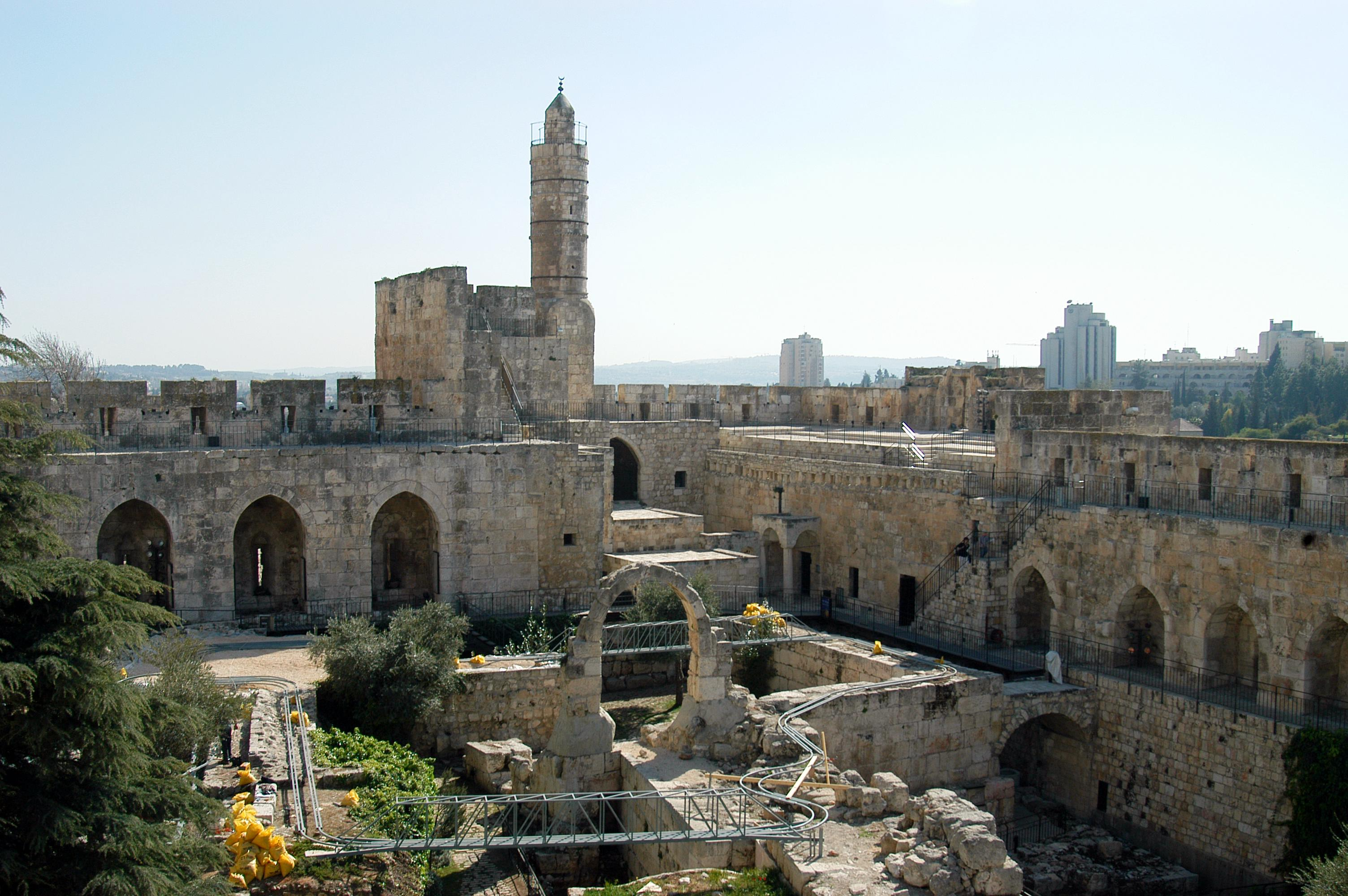
View of archaeological finds in the courtyard and the Ottoman minaret

In 2010, a survey of the site was conducted by Yehudah Rapuano on behalf of the Israel Antiquities Authority (IAA).

== See also ==
- Bezalel Pavilion at Jaffa Gate (1912–1918), shop and showroom of the Bezalel School of Arts somewhat resembling the Citadel
- Illés Relief, model of Jerusalem built in 1867–1873, on permanent display at the Citadel
- Tower of David Period, nickname for Jewish art in Palestine during the 1920s
