= Tower of David (northeast tower) =

Tower in Jerusalem

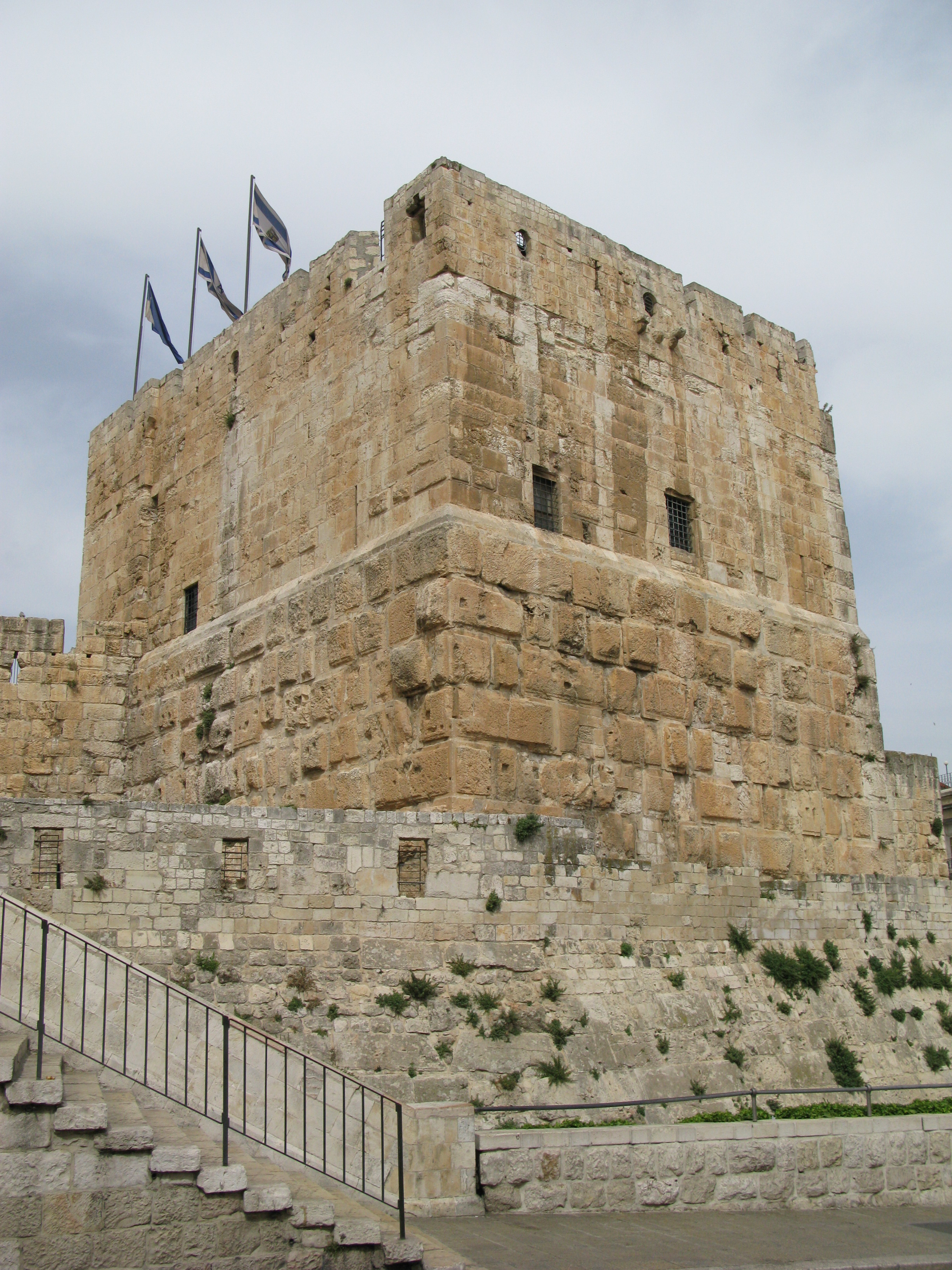
- The Phasael or Hippicus Tower

- Location within Old City of Jerusalem
- 31°46′33.9″N 35°13′40.93″E
- Type: Tower
- Location: Old Jerusalem

History
- Built: 1st century BCE

Site notes
- Material: Stone
- Public access: Yes

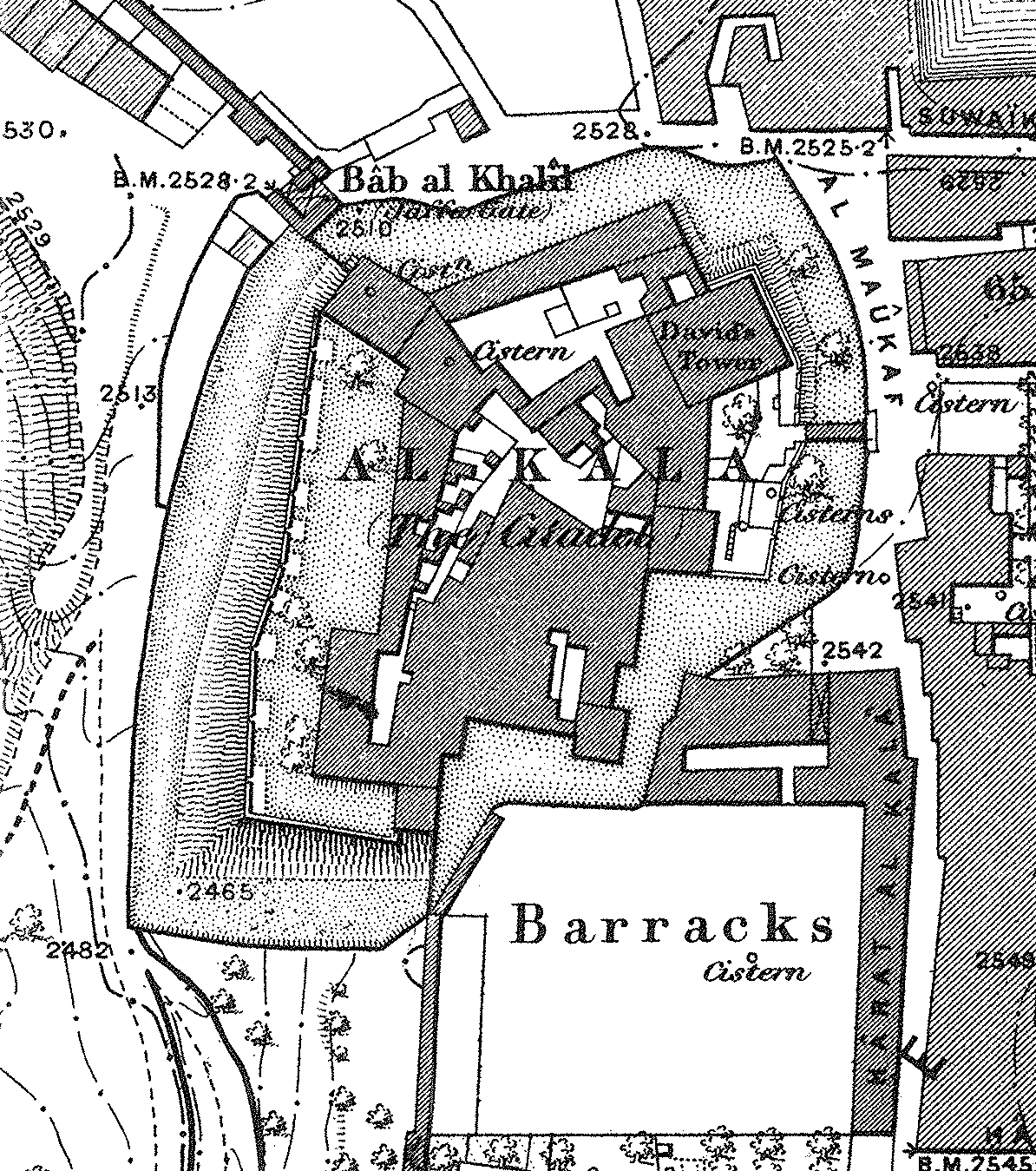
1865 Ordnance Survey of Jerusalem

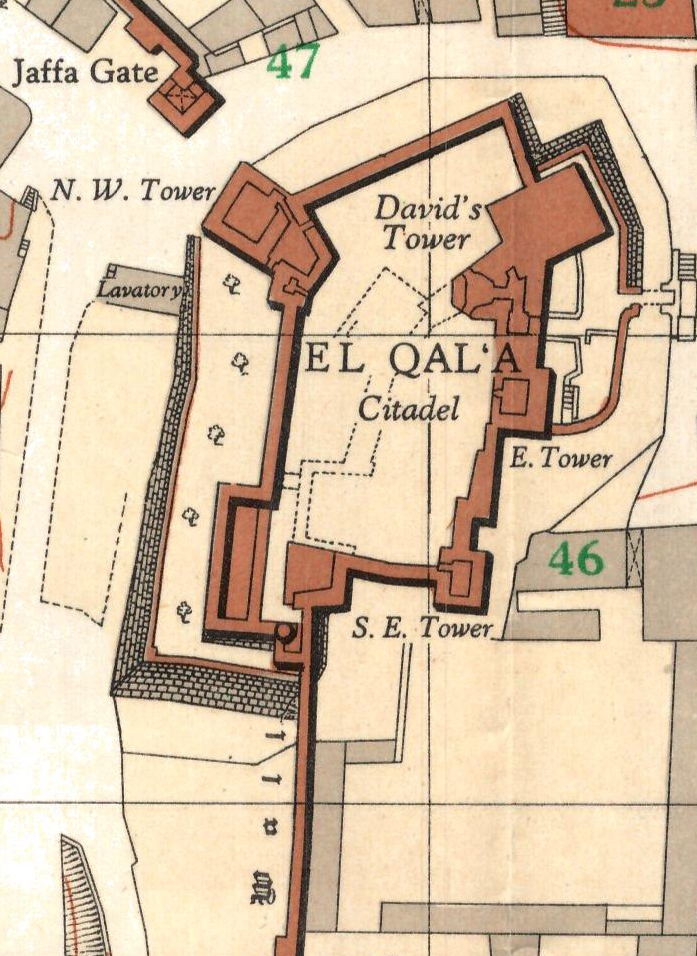
1936 Survey of Palestine

The citadel, with David's Tower labelled in the 1865 and 1936. The label "Tower of David" is now commonly used to refer to the Ottoman minaret on the south west side of the citadel (shown as a small red circle on the 1936 map)

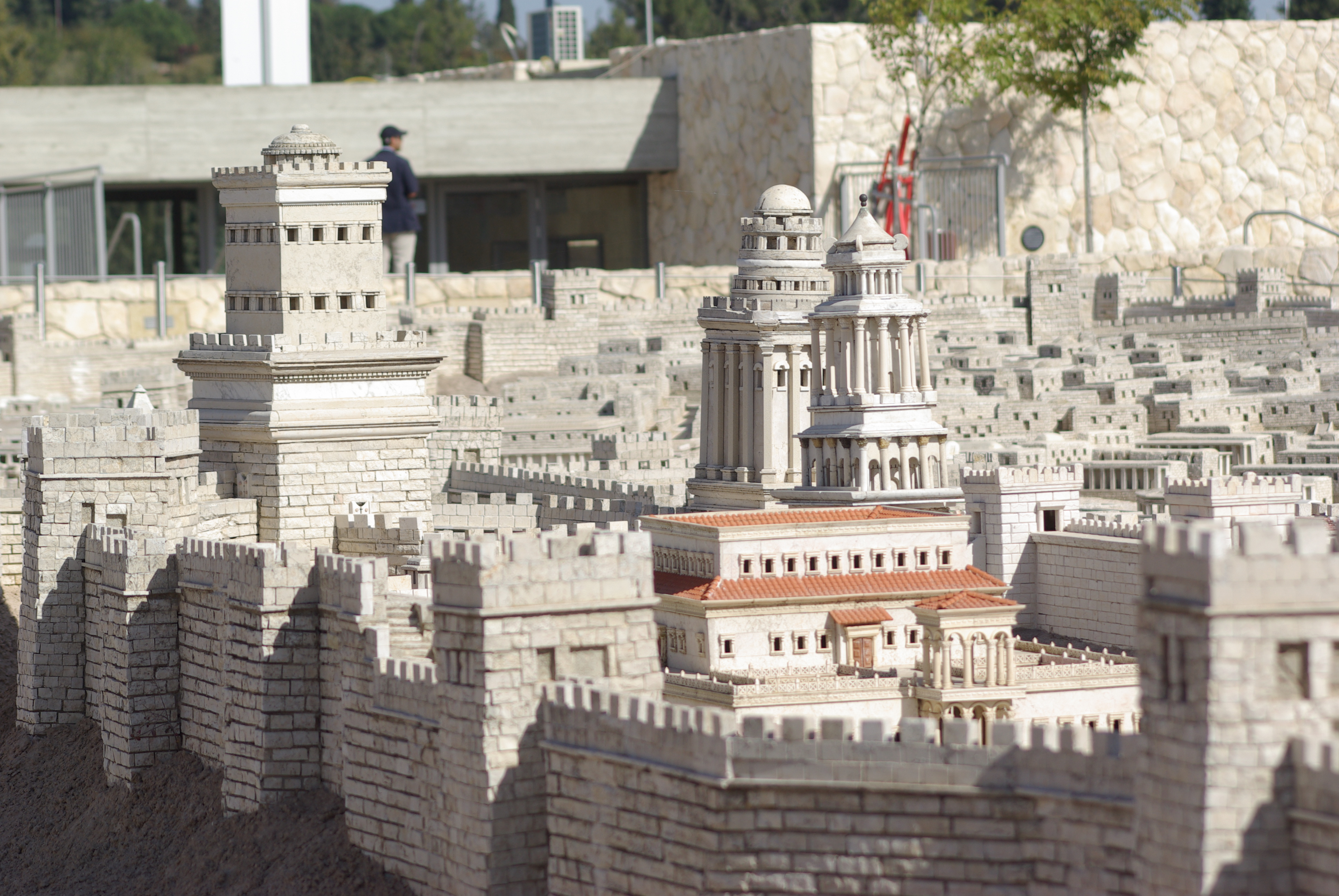
The three towers - Phasael, Hippicus and Mariamne - as part of the Jerusalem city model from the Israel Museum, Jerusalem

Tower of David is a historical name given to the northeast tower of the Citadel of Jerusalem. It has been identified as a Herodian structure, either the Phasael Tower or the Hippicus Tower described by the ancient Jewish historian Josephus.

== History ==
=== Herodian towers ===
The towers named Phasael, Hippicus and Mariamne were situated in the northwest corner of the so-called First Wall, the Hasmonean and Herodian city wall protecting the Western Hill of Jerusalem. They were situated close to where the Jaffa Gate is today and were built by Herod the Great at the same time he built his immediately adjacent royal palace. These towers protected the main entrance to the city, as well as the palace, constituting a potential last refuge for the king. All three towers have vanished except for the base of the Hippicus (or Phasael) Tower, upon which the present "Tower of David" rests.

The towers were named by Herod after his brother Phasael, his friend, Hippicus, who had fallen in battle, and his favourite wife, Mariamne.

When the city was razed in AD 70, all three towers were left standing, in order to show off the strength of the fortifications the Roman army had to overcome.

...Caesar gave orders that they should now demolish the entire city and temple, but should leave as many of the towers standing as were of the greatest eminence; that is, Phasael, and Hippicus, and Mariamme, and so much of the wall as enclosed the city on the west side. This wall was spared, in order to afford a camp for such as were to lie in garrison; as were the towers also spared, in order to demonstrate to posterity what kind of city it was, and how well fortified, which the Roman valour had subdued.

With time though, only one of Herod's towers survived - either the Phasael Tower, or, according to some, including archaeologist Hillel Geva who excavated the Citadel, the Hippicus Tower.

=== Byzantine name, "Tower of David" ===
During the Byzantine period, the remaining tower, and by extension the Citadel as a whole, acquired its alternative name - the Tower of David - after the Byzantines, mistakenly identifying the hill as Mount Zion, presumed it to be David's palace mentioned in 2 Samuel 5:11, 11:1-27, 16:22.

=== Early Muslim "Mihrab Dawud" tradition ===
In medieval times, Muslim Arabs called the gate next to the tower Bab Mihrab Dawud, or "Gate of David's Chamber or Sanctuary", on the belief that the room atop the Herodian tower stump represented the "private chamber" or "prayer room" of Prophet Dawud (King David), which is specifically mentioned in the Quran (Surah 38. Sad, Ayah 21).

=== Citadel extension ===
The Citadel was gradually built up under Muslim and Crusader rule and acquired the basis of its present shape in 1310, under the Mamluk sultan Malik al-Nasir. Suleiman the Magnificent later constructed the monumental gateway in the east that you enter through today. The minaret, a prominent Jerusalem landmark, was added between 1635 and 1655, and took over the title of "Tower of David" in the nineteenth century, so that the name can now refer to either the whole Citadel or the minaret alone.

== Description ==
Of the original tower itself, some sixteen courses of the original stone ashlars can still be seen rising from ground level, upon which further courses of smaller stones were added in a later period, which significantly increased its height.

On the way up, a terrace overlooking the Citadel excavations has plaques identifying the different periods of all the remains. These include part of the Hasmonean city wall, a Roman cistern, and the ramparts of the Umayyad citadel, which held out for five weeks before falling to the Crusaders in 1099.

From the top of the tower, there are good views over the excavations inside the Citadel and out to the Old City, as well as into the distance south and west.

== Gallery ==
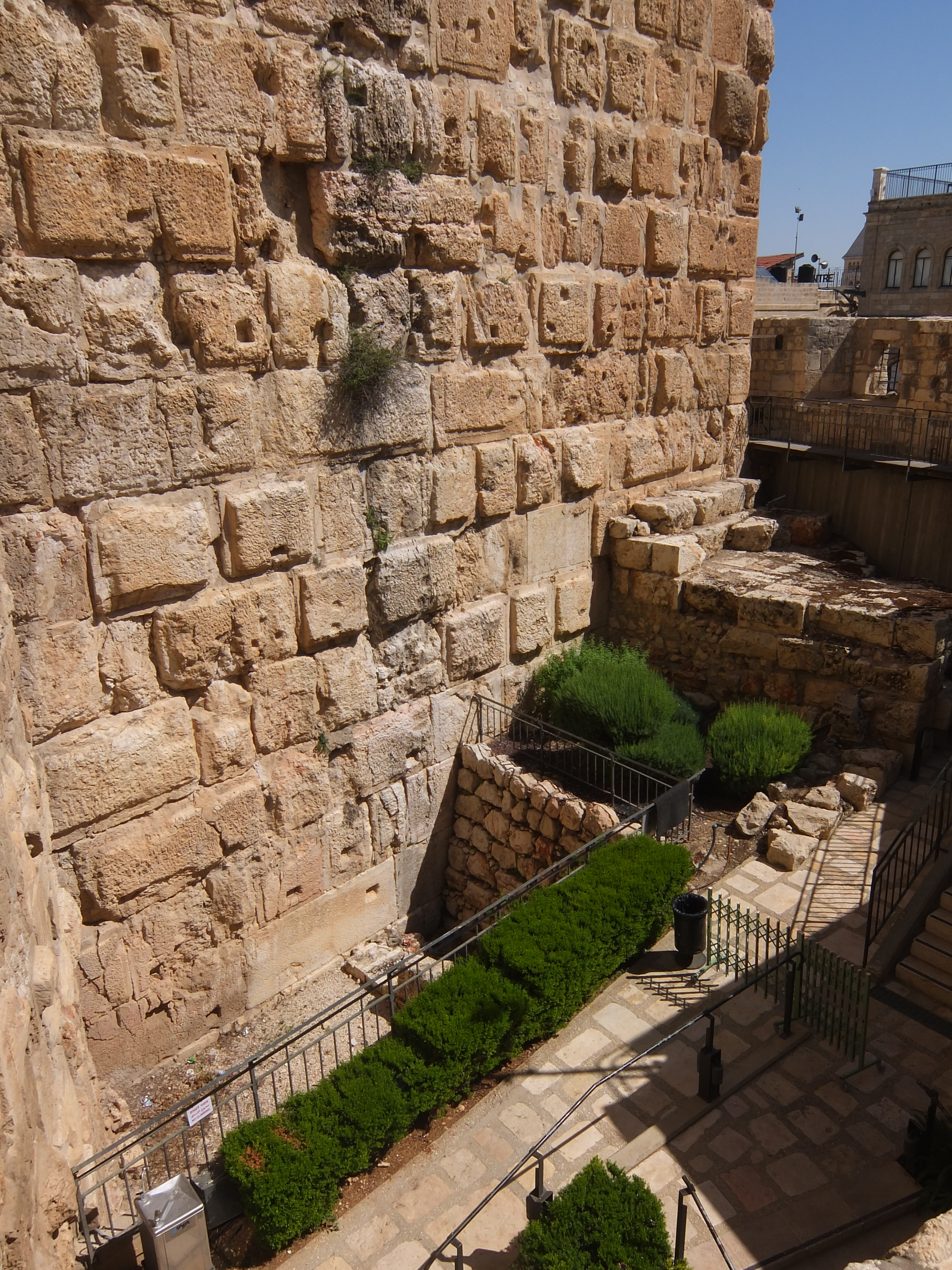
Southern outer wall

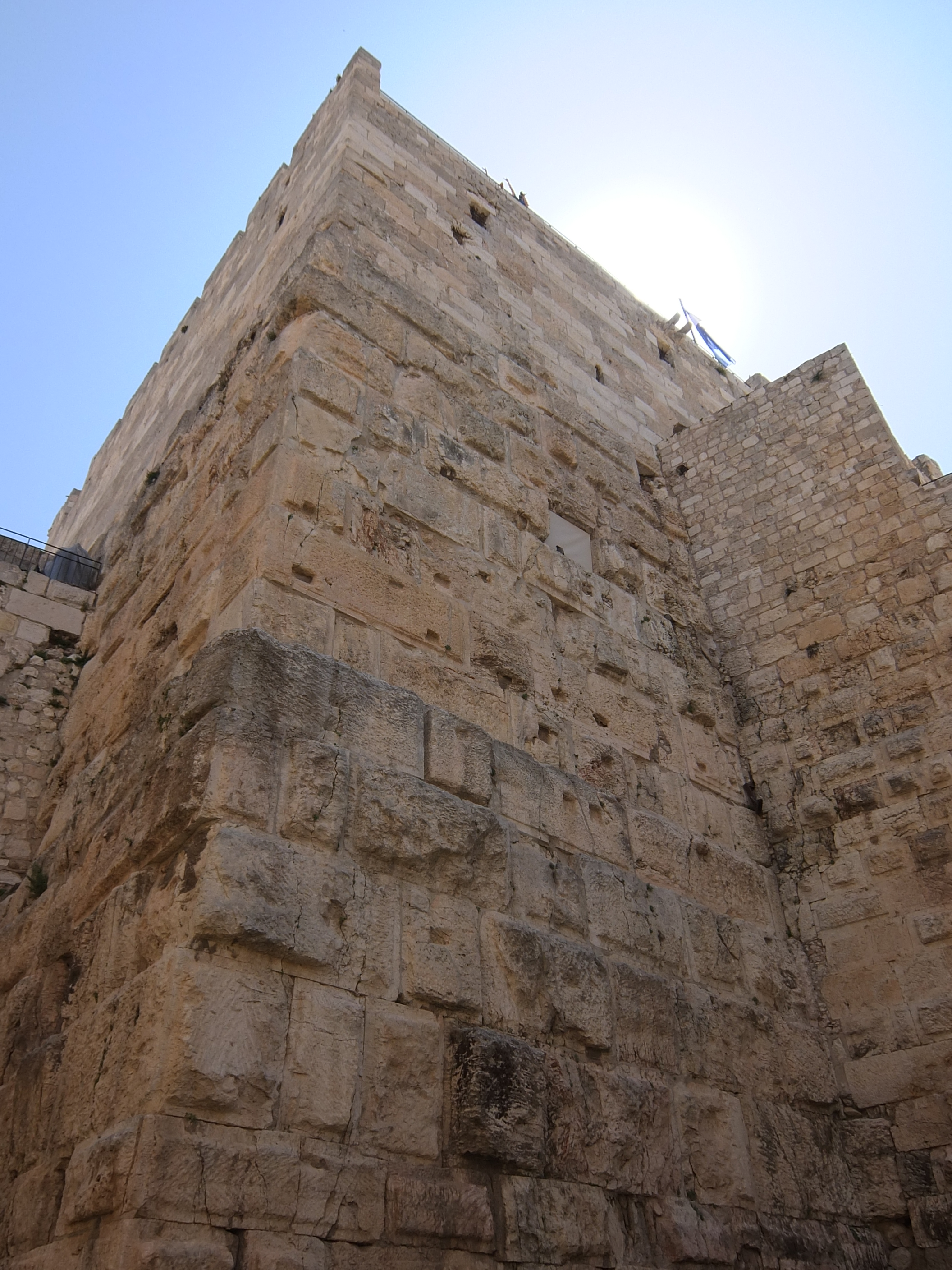
The tower from northeast

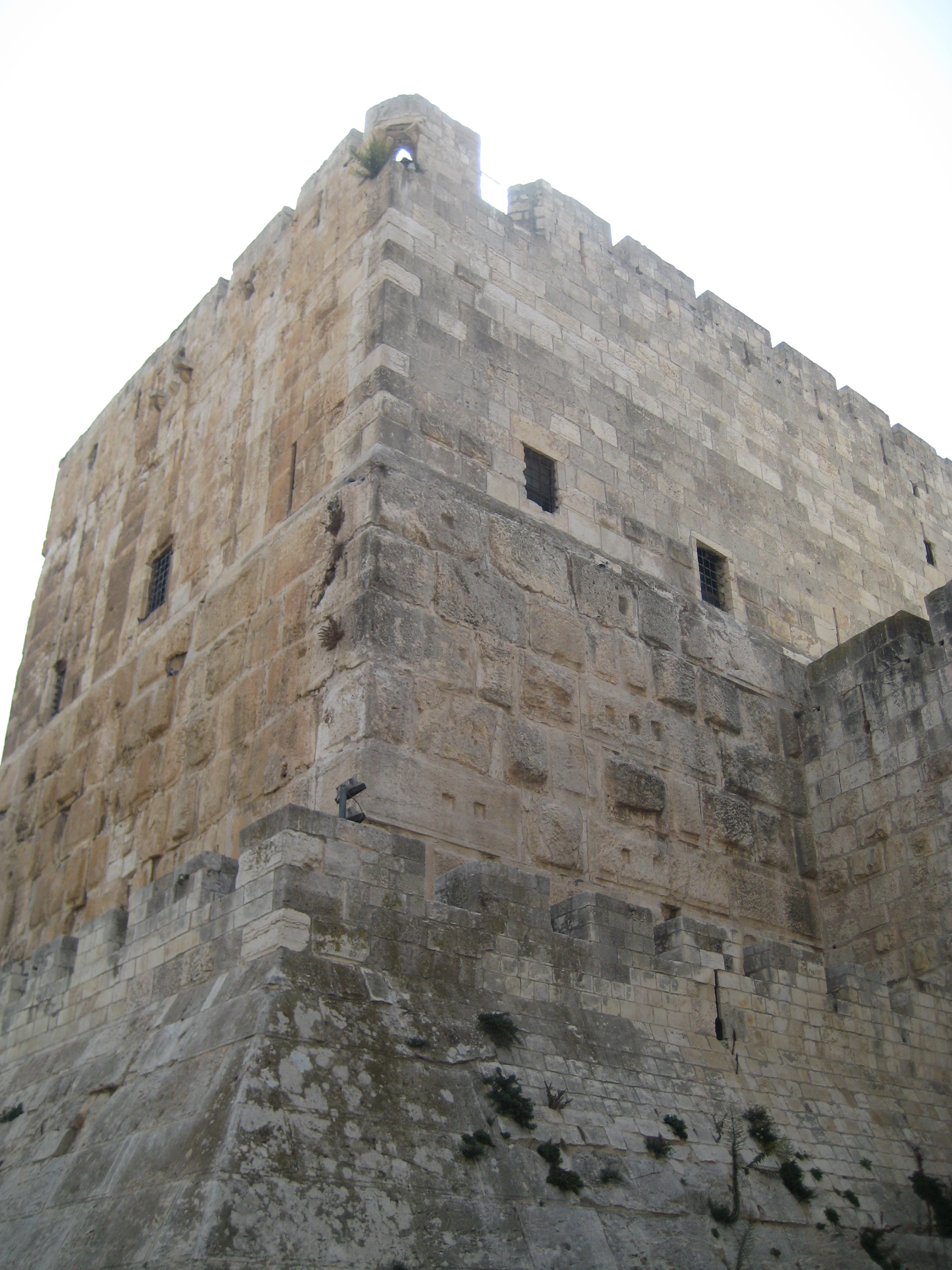
The tower and medieval glacis from northeast

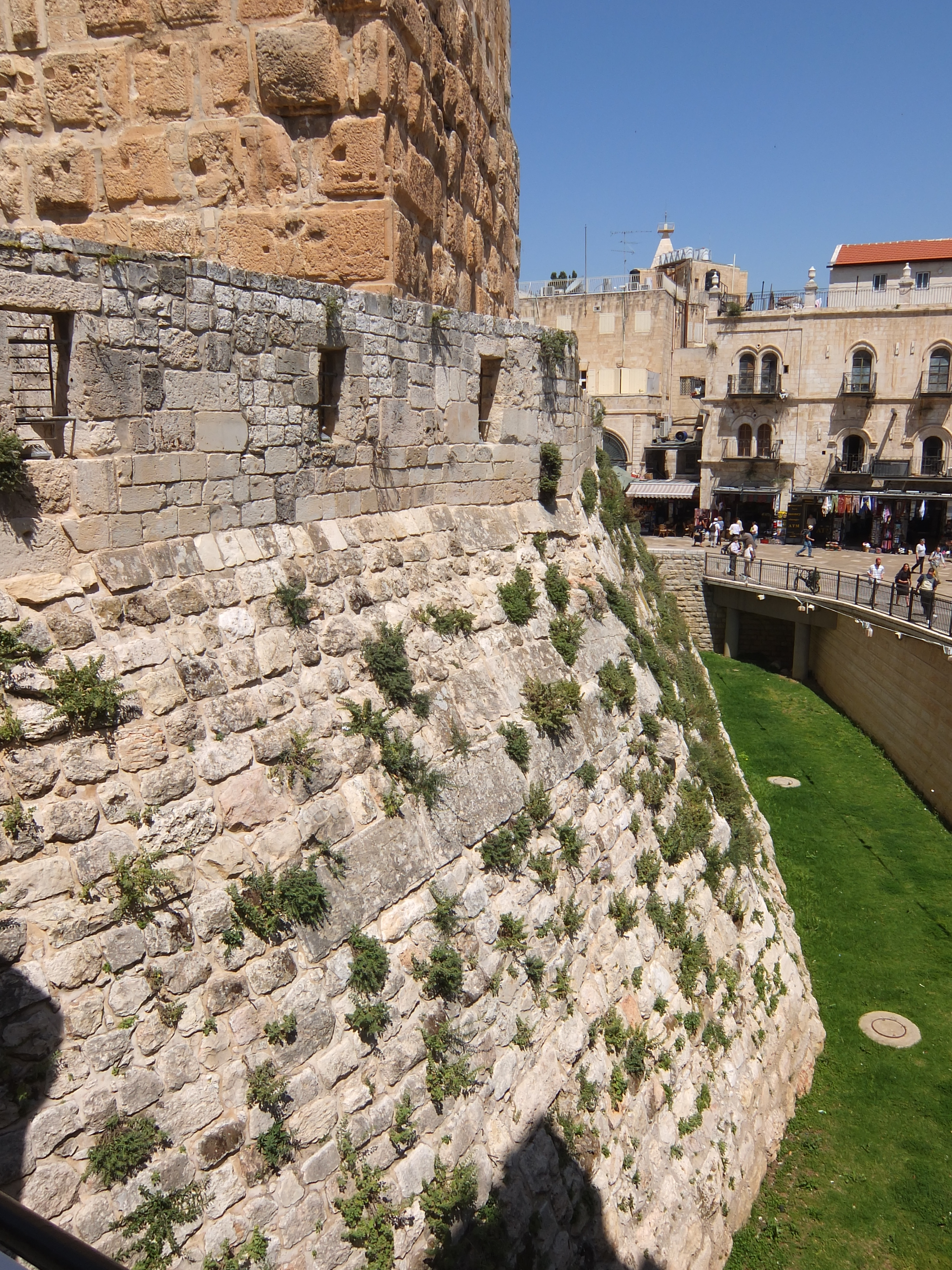
The tower and the moat separating it from the city

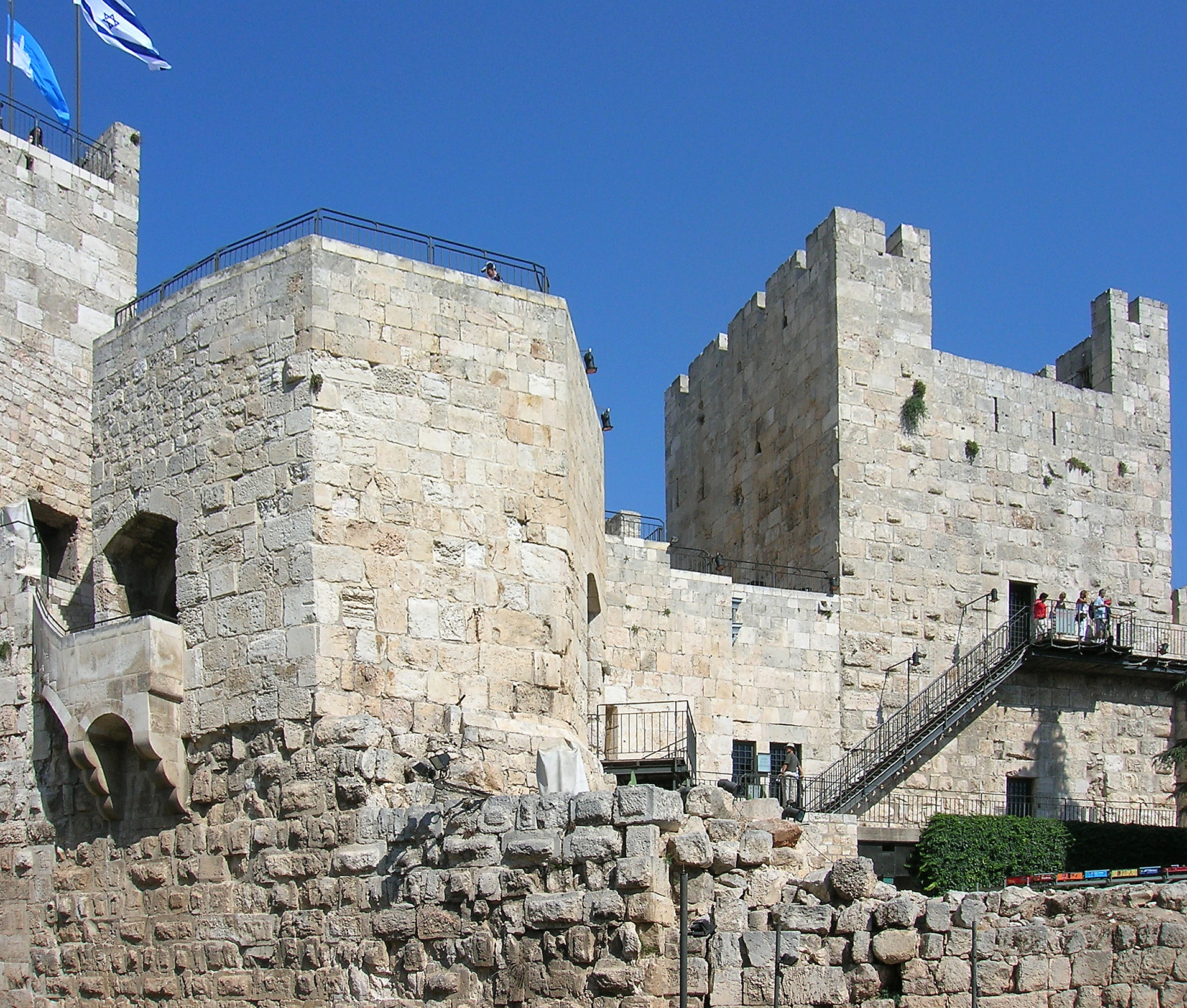
The Citadel, inner view with the ancient tower on the left (small section, with flags)

== See also ==
- Phasael (disambiguation)
- Tower of David (disambiguation)
