= Beit HaKerem =

Beit HaKerem (Hebrew בית הכרם: "house of the vineyard") may refer to:

- Beit HaKerem, Jerusalem, a neighborhood in west-central Jerusalem
- Beit HaKerem (Bible), a biblical fortress in Judea identified with either the later Herodium site, Ramat Rachel, or Ein Karem
- Beit HaKerem Valley, a valley in northern Israel's Galilee
- Beit HaKerem, the original name of the Hebrew University Secondary School in Jerusalem

== See also ==
- Carem, a town in Judea mentioned only in the Septuagint
- Ein Kerem, sometimes identified with Beit HaKerem
