= Westville Boys' High School =

Coordinates: 29°49′48″S 30°55′44″E

- WBHS badge

Location
- 26 Wandsbeck Road; Westville, KwaZulu-Natal 3631; South Africa

Information
- Type: Semi-Private
- Motto: Incepto Ne Desistam (“May I not shrink from my purpose!")
- Established: 1955
- Locale: Suburban
- Sister school: Westville Girls' High School
- Headmaster: Graham Steele
- Exam board: KZN Education Dept.
- Grades: 8–12
- Enrollment: 1450 boys
- Student to teacher ratio: 17:1
- Colors: Red, white and navy
- Mascot: The Griffin
- Website: wbhs.co.za

Westville Boys' High School, often referred to as WBHS or "boys high", is a semi-private high school for boys located in Westville, KwaZulu-Natal, South Africa.

== Early history ==
The year 2026 marks the 71st anniversary of WBHS as a high school. The roots of the school can be traced back to 1861, when German immigrant farmers operated a school from a nine by four metre wattle-and-daub structure sited on the main Durban-to-Pietermaritzburg road. They were the first large group of squatters to populate the area, named after Sir Martin West, the first Lieutenant Governor of Natal.

The next recorded date of a school in Westville was in March 1935 when the Westville Kindergarten School, a private farm school, first opened its doors. Under the guidance of Miss Gladys Carr, the school eventually outgrew the Church Hall used at the time. In 1941 the school was moved to Bernard's House, an old house situated on the present school site. This residence on 6 acres (2.4 ha) of land had been bequeathed by Mr and Mrs Bernard to the people of Westville for educational purposes. It was near this site that the Outspan Tree, which marked the first overnight stop for the old ox wagons travailing to the interior, once stood. The Outspan Tree today forms part of the WBHS badge.

By 1944 the admissions roll had increased to 66 pupils. The following year the co-educational Westville Government School opened as a provincial institution and operated at primary level until 1955. In 1949, Bernard's House was demolished to make way for the new school buildings which were opened in January 1950. The year 2000 marked the fiftieth anniversary of the opening of these buildings that today form the inner quadrangle of the school. A ceremony was held in recognition of the contribution made by the Bernard family, and a memorial in their honour was erected on the site of the original farmhouse.

=== Birth of a high school ===
Secondary education at Westville can be traced back to 1955 when a group of 21 pupils formed the first Standard Seven (Grade Nine) class of the then Westville High School. The secondary school initially co-existed with the infant and primary classes but by 1961 the last of those classes were accommodated in separate institutions.

In 1963 work on the building of a new Westville Girls' High School commenced and at the end of 1964, the split into the boys' and the girls' high schools was completed. The Headmaster who laid the foundation and guided the school into full secondary status was N.W. Bowden (1955–1963). The main sports field bears his name.

A number of projects aimed at developing the school physically were initiated between 1961 and 1963. In 1961 work on what was later to be called Commons Field began and a pavilion and scoreboard were erected on Bowden's Field. Work commenced on the school hall in 1962. In 1963 the three-story complex overlooking the tennis courts was started and this was the beginning of a building program which developed over the next ten years. Mr H. Commons became the Headmaster in 1964, the year in which the school split into two single-sex schools. Mr Commons's years as headmaster ended when he was promoted to the Headmastership of Maritzburg College.

In July 1966, D.C. Thompson became the Headmaster. For three years in succession, 1968–1970, and again in 1972, WBHS provided the top pupil in the Natal Education Department's matriculation examination. Thompson adopted a new focus on extramural activities, as he said: "The essential thing is that every boy in the school should do something in and for the school, and, in giving unselfishly of himself, should contribute to the growth of that corporate spirit that is so prominent a feature of the alive school."

C.D. Harcourt (1971–1973), P.C. Doyle (1975–1983), R.W. Couzens (1983–1989) and K. Elliott (1990) each served subsequently as headmaster.

=== Badge ===
The emblem of the WBHS badge is a shield, quartered by the red cross of St George. In the upper left-hand quarter is the griffin taken from the coat of arms of Martin West, the first Lieutenant-Governor of Natal, after whom Westville is named. In legend, griffins are portrayed with a lion's body, an eagle's head, long ears, and an eagle's claws, to indicate that the student should combine intelligence with strength. The upper right and lower left divisions contain the Book of Knowledge and the Lamp of learning respectively. Represented in the lower right quarter is the historic monument, the Outspan Tree, which is in Jan Hofmeyr Road, where the ox-wagons made their first stop after leaving Durban.

The badge has been updated after a rebranding process in 2021. The icons have changed in look to be cleaner and reflect a more modern badge.

=== Motto ===
Westville Boys' High School's motto Incepto Ne Desistam is taken directly from Virgil. These words, found in Aeneid, Book 1, are used by Juno, queen of heaven who hated the Trojans led by Aeneas. When she saw the fleet of Aeneas on its way to Italy, after the sack of Troy by the Greeks, she planned to scatter it by means of strong winds. In her determination to accomplish her task she cried out "Incepto Ne Desistam!" which translates as "May I not shrink from my purpose!"

=== Matric song ===
Each year at speech night and prize giving the matriculating class sings Forty Years On. The song, which is the main school song of Harrow School in the United Kingdom, is sung at several schools around the world. The lyrics of the song reflect on what it will be like for members of the matriculating class to visit their old school again in forty years time. The song was introduced to WBHS by Mr T. Brown, a former Senior Deputy Headmaster of the school. The only other school in South Africa which sings this song is Pretoria Boys' High School.

=== Houses ===
The houses are named after people or symbols related to the history of the school:

- Bernard – created in 2004 and named after the family that donated the property on which the school stands. Bernard is represented by the colour grey.
- Carr – created in 1947 during the existence of the Westville Government School, and named after Mrs Gladys Carr, founder of the first school in Westville. Carr is represented by the colour green.
- Cliff – created in 1950 and named after Mr P.K. Cliff, Inspector of Schools and friend of the school. Cliff is represented by the colour blue.
- Hofmeyer – created in 1978 and named after Jan Hofmeyr, the celebrated Member of Parliament. Jan Hofmeyr Road lies adjacent to Bowden's Field. Hofmeyer is represented by the colour yellow.
- Outspan – created in 2004 and named after the Outspan Tree that appears on the school badge. Outspan is represented by the colour Royal Blue.
- Swain – created in 1957 and named after Mr C.E. Swain, a staff member and sportsman. Swain is represented by the colour red.
- Wandsbeck – created in 1947 and named after the farm on which the school stands. Wandsbeck is represented by the colour orange.
- West – created in 1978 and named after Martin West, after whom the Borough of Westville was named. West is represented by the colour black.

=== Awards System ===
The school has a school blazer scroll and braiding awards system to recognize the achievements of individuals and their contribution to school life through academics, sports, culture and service.

The awards rankings:

- Pro Meritis - the highest award represented by a maroon blazer, not awarded every year
- Honours - Blazer with maroon, white & blue cord with scroll for activity name
- Full Colours - Blazer with white cord with scroll for activity name
- Half Colours - White cord on the top pocket only and scroll with relevant activity
- Team Award - Blazer scroll only with activity name
- Venator Award - Scroll for sports participation throughout school career, Venator being a type of Roman Gladiator and Latin for 'Hunter'

Honours and Pro Meritis award winners are recognised on the Honours Boards at the school entrance.

Awards are made for:

- Academics
- Service
- Culture (Dramatics, Debating, Choir, Music)
- School Sports (Rugby, Cricket, Hockey, Athletics, Swimming, Waterpolo, Soccer (Football), Squash, Tennis, Softball, Cross Country, Basketball, Golf, Indoor Hockey, Rugby 7's, Touch Rugby, Badminton, Surfing, Bodyboarding, Mountain Biking, Canoeing, Volleyball, Chess, Sailing)

== Modern times ==
E. W. Maddams (1991–1997) took over the school during a period of political uncertainty. 1991 heralded the introduction of Model B status and the school was permitted to open its doors to pupils of all races, which it did at the beginning of the 1991 school year. In August 1992, as a result of a majority vote by the parents, the school changed to Model C. This brought about additional financial burdens on the parent body but did give them more say in the development of the school.

Other developments during this time included the Ted Maddams Media Centre and the modernisation and expansion of the computer facilities. Ted Maddams retired as Headmaster in 1997.

In 1997, Trevor Hall became the first WBHS Old Boy to be appointed Headmaster of the school. The first major developments under Mr Hall's leadership have been the development of an upper level of Bowden's Pavilion, which has provided a domicile for the Westville Boys' High School Association, and the introduction of the integrated timetable and Sports Academy.

In 2002, the launch of the Sports Academy introduced a new programme for all pupils in the school to participate in sports. The main feature of the school's new approach to sport was the integration of sport into the daily curriculum, in addition to the traditional team practices that occur at the end of each school day. The integrated sports time table has improved results in swimming, athletics, squash, cricket and rugby, among other sports.

One of the most significant recent development at the school was the opening of the R6.5 million multi-purpose centre. The facility caters for school assemblies, timetabled sport, afternoon sports practices, indoor field hockey, tennis and four cricket nets (two for bowling and the other two have bowling machines), choir festivals, dramatic productions, a gymnasium and offices. The preferred site was the area where the swimming pool is currently situated, but costs in relocating the pool were prohibitive. Consequently, the centre was built on the site of the old tennis courts adjacent to Commons Field.

A further development was the construction of a hockey astroturf, which is a shared facility of WBHS, Westville Girls' High School and Westville Senior Primary School, located on the premises of Westville Girls' High School. In 2013 work was concluded on a new aquatic centre, which includes two swimming pools, the Chad Ho Pool and the Chad le Clos Pool.

In 2018, Trevor Hall retired following 22 years as Headmaster. In mid-2019 Graham Steele became the tenth headmaster of the school, having previously served as Headmaster of Kimberley Boys' High School.

Westville Boys High school, managed a 14-year unbeaten run in swimming and it is widely regarded as the best swimming school in the country.

== Academics ==
In 1999, the Dux of the school, Colin Bigg, achieved the top matric results in South Africa, the previous year he was the first pupil to ever be awarded an Honours Blazer for academics in Standard 9. In 1999, WBHS was also rated the best state-aided school in the country in a survey by the Sunday Times newspaper, and again in 2009 was ranked in the top 10 list of schools in South Africa for maths and science. In 2002, 21 students were awarded Matric Honours blazers for academics, the most number of Honours awards to a single matric year group in the school's history, with 4 featuring in the top 30 in the KZN province.

Following the 2006 matric examinations, WBHS was admitted to an elite group of only 13 schools in South Africa that achieved more than 100 passes for maths on the Higher Grade. It is the only school in KZN province to win this accolade. Following the 2008 matric examinations, two learners from WBHS were placed first and second in the province respectively. For the 2010 matric examinations, Westville Boys grabbed three places in the top 10 of KZN, gaining a placement of second, fifth and ninth in KZN. The 2013 Dux of school featured the top matric results in the province and was placed first in the country among quintile five schools being the second pupil from the school to do so. Following the 2016 examinations, Westville learners were placed fourth, fifth and eighth in the province. Following the 2018 examinations, Westville learners were placed first, fourth and eighth in the province. And following the 2020 examinations, Westville learners were placed second, fifth and seventh in KZN.

== Notable alumni sportsmen ==
- Mickey Arthur – SA 'A' cricketer, SA national cricket coach (2005–2010), Australian national cricket coach (2011–2013), Pakistan national cricket coach (2016–2019), Sri Lanka national cricket coach (2019–2022)
- Martin-Dale Bradley - Guernsey T20 International Cricket
- Oscar Chalupsky – 12 times world surfski champion and Olympian at 1992 Barcelona Olympics
- Chad Le Clos – SA swimmer, and Olympian at 2012 London Games (2 medals), 2016 Rio de Janeiro Games (2 medals) and 2020 Tokyo Games
- Charl Crous – SA swimmer and Olympian at 2012 Games in London
- Shaun Davies – USA Eagles rugby, Life Running Eagles player and participant at the 2019 Rugby World Cup
- Roland De Marigny – Italian rugby player and participant at the 2007 Rugby World Cup
- Cameron Delport – SA 'A' cricketer
- George Earle – Cardiff Blues Rugby player
- Bryce Easton - golfer, 3 times winner on the Sunshine Tour
- Ellis Ferreira – SA Davis Cup Tennis, Olympian at 1996 Atlanta Olympics, Men's Doubles champion Australian Open 2000, Mixed Doubles champion Australian Open 2001
- Robert Frylinck – SA T20 cricket
- Ray Hass – Australian swimmer. Gold medal winner at the 2002 World Championships
- David Hibberd - SA sailor and Olympian at the 1996 Atlanta Games
- Chad Ho – SA open water swimmer and Olympian at the 2008 Olympics in Beijing and 2016 Olympics in Rio de Janeiro
- Ethan Hooker – Sharks and Springbok Rugby Union Player
- Keith Horne – golfer, 5 times winner on the Sunshine Tour, and silver medalist at the 1993 World Games
- Calvyn Justus – SA swimmer and Olympian at 2016 Games in Rio de Janeiro
- Jeremy Kark - Member of the National Israel Cricket Team and record holder
- Alan Koch - Head Coach of FC Cincinnati soccer team (2017–present)
- Robbie Koenig – SA tennis player and US Open Doubles finalist
- George Koumantarakis – SA footballer and participant in 2002 FIFA World Cup
- Waylon Murray – Sharks and Springbok Rugby Union Player
- Shaun Payne – Springbok Rugby 7's and Munster rugby player
- Ryan Pretorius – American football place kicker with the Ohio State Buckeyes
- Bryan Rennie (rugby union) - Exeter Chiefs and Scotland A Rugby Union player
- Leith Shankland – SA swimmer and Olympian at the 2012 London Olympics
- Errol Stewart – SA ODI cricketer & Natal rugby player; SA National Cricket selector; dual sport Currie Cup winner 1995
- Trevor Strydom – SA fencer and modern pentathlete, and Olympian at 1992 Games in Barcelona
- Myles Wakefield - SA Davis Cup player
- Zane Weir - Italian shot put athlete and Olympian at the Tokyo 2020 and Paris 2024 Games
- Peter Wetzlar - Zimbabwean swimmer and Olympian at the 2020 Tokyo Games
- Khaya Zondo – SA ODI and Test cricket

== Springbok rugby players ==
- Springbok number 513 Tim Cocks 1980 Tour of South America
- Springbok number 785 Waylon Murray 9 June 2007 v Samoa
- Springbok number 948 Ethan Hooker 12 July 2025 v Italy
