= Ronit =

Ronit is both a Hindi and Hebrew given name. Notable people with the name include:

== Hebrew given name ==
- Ronit Avni, Canadian entrepreneur, film director and producer
- Ronit Elkabetz (1964–2016), Israeli actress, screenwriter, and film director
- Ronit Kark, Israeli psychologist and professor
- Ronit Lentin (born 1944), Israeli/Irish political sociologist and writer
- Ronit Matalon (1969–2017), Israeli fiction writer
- Ronit Tirosh (born 1953), Israeli politician

== Hindi given name ==
- Ronit More (born 1992), Indian first-class cricketer
- Ronit Roy (born 1965), Indian actor
- Ronit Plank, Indian author, writer, editor, podcaster, and teacher
