= Jeremy David Kark =

South African-born Israeli epidemiologist

- ג'רמי דוד קרק
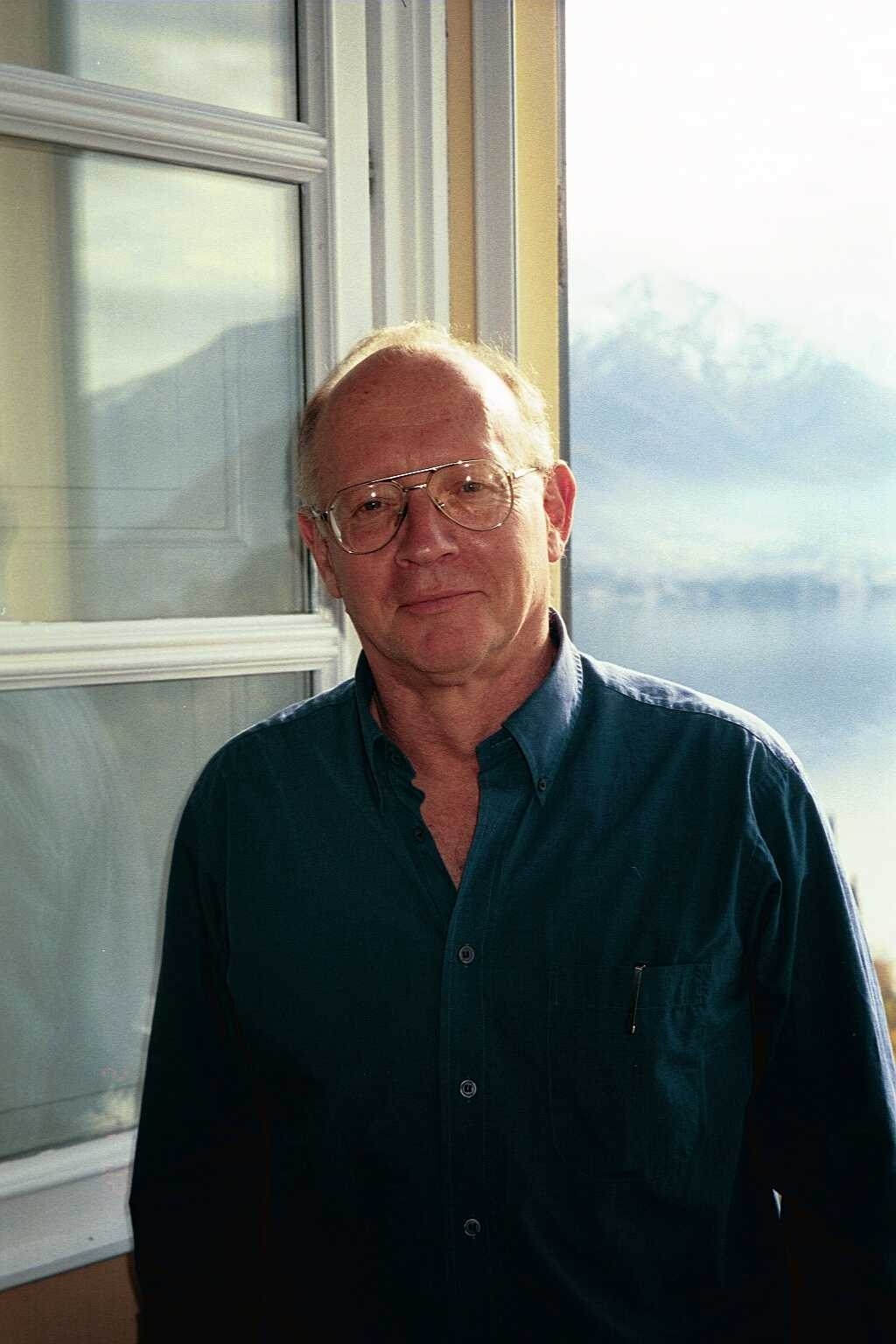
- Born: 9 September 1943; Pholela, Zululand, South Africa
- Died: 24 May 2018 (aged 74); Jerusalem, Israel
- Occupations: Professor of Epidemiology and Public Health
- Spouse: Ruth Kark
- Children: Ronit Kark, Salit Kark, Guy Kark
- Parent(s): Emily Kark and Sidney Kark

Academic background
- Education: Westville Boys High School, Durban, South Africa (1955-1958) Chapel Hill High School, NC, USA (1958-1960) The Hebrew University of Jerusalem, Israel (1960-1974) University of North Carolina, Chapel Hill, NC, USA (1974-1977)

Academic work
- Discipline: Medicine Epidemiology Public Health

Jeremy David Kark (Hebrew: ג'רמי דוד קרק; 9 September 1943 – 24 May 2018) was a South African-born Israeli epidemiologist. He was a professor of epidemiology at the Hebrew University – Hadassah School of Public Health and Community Medicine in Jerusalem and an adjunct at Stanford University Center for Health Policy Research.

== Biography ==
Jeremy David Kark was born in Pholela, KwaZulu-Natal, South Africa. His parents, Sidney Kark and Emily Kark, were physicians. They established the first Community Oriented Primary Care (COPC) program and health centre in South Africa in a Zululand rural area, where Kark grew up until 1946. Kark attended Westville Boys' High School in Durban, and moved with his family to Chapel Hill, North Carolina, USA in 1957. In 1958, his father founded the Department of Epidemiology of the School of Public Health at the University of North Carolina. In 1959, Kark's parents immigrated to Jerusalem, where they worked to establish the Department of Social Medicine of the Hebrew University and Hadassah Medical Organization. When Kark graduated from Chapel Hill High School in 1960, he joined his family in Israel.

Kark studied medicine at the Faculty of Medicine of the Hebrew University of Jerusalem, graduating in 1968. He earned an MPH (Master of Public Health) between 1972 and 1974 at the Hebrew University of Jerusalem. Between 1974 and 1977 he pursued a PhD in epidemiology with Professor John Cassel at the University of North Carolina in Chapel Hill, USA.

Kark was married to Ruth Kleiner Kark, whom he met in 1960, and had three children. He died in May 2018.

== Academic and medical career ==
Kark served in the Israel Defence Forces in the 1960s to 1980s. Between 1976 and 1980, he was the director of Army Health (Public Health) of the IDF Medical Corps. From 1980 until 1995 he was the head of the Epidemiology Research Unit of the IDF Medical Corps. Kark established key medical databases and a bio-repository in the IDF.

In 1980, Kark joined the Department of Social Medicine, the Braun School of Public Health and Community Medicine, the Hebrew University-Hadassah Faculty of Medicine as an academic. In 1993, Kark was appointed as Full Professor of Epidemiology at the Hebrew University of Jerusalem.

In 1991–2008, Kark served as head of Epidemiology Unit of Hadassah Hospital. In 1994–2001, he headed the Cardiovascular Unit at the Israeli Center for Disease Control. He also served as the director of the Legacy-Heritage International MPH Program, Hebrew University-Hadassah School of Public Health and Community Medicine in 2006 –2007.

Kark contributed to medical research, the Jerusalem Lipid Research Clinic (LRC) longitudinal study of cardiovascular, cancer, diabetes and cognitive risk factors (from the 1970s-today) and studies on adolescent predictors of cancer and cause-specific mortality in adulthood of over two million people, with a follow-up period extending over four decades. His study in Israel during the 1991 Gulf War showed the impact of stress on premature death. His work on the relationship between religious observance and health compared religious and secular Israeli kibbutzim and discovered lower mortality rates in the religious kibbutzim for both men and women, suggesting a protective effect.

Kark published his work in over 300 peer-reviewed scientific papers, including medical, public health and epidemiological journals, such as The New England Journal of Medicine, and The Lancet.

== Sports career ==
As a high school and university student, Kark actively competed in various branches of sports, including cricket, rugby and swimming. In 1958–1960, after moving to Chapel Hill, North Carolina, USA, he represented Chapel Hill High in swimming and represented the North Carolina All State High School Swimming Team (of which he was co-Captain) in freestyle swimming. In 1960, when Kark was 16 years old, during a match between Jerusalem's team (which Kark represented) and Tel Aviv, he scored 199 (including 16 sixes) and achieved the highest cricket score ever recorded in Israel. Kark played on Israel's national cricket team and represented Israel as a member of Israel's National Cricket Team in the 10th Maccabiah Games in 1977.

== Awards and commemoration ==
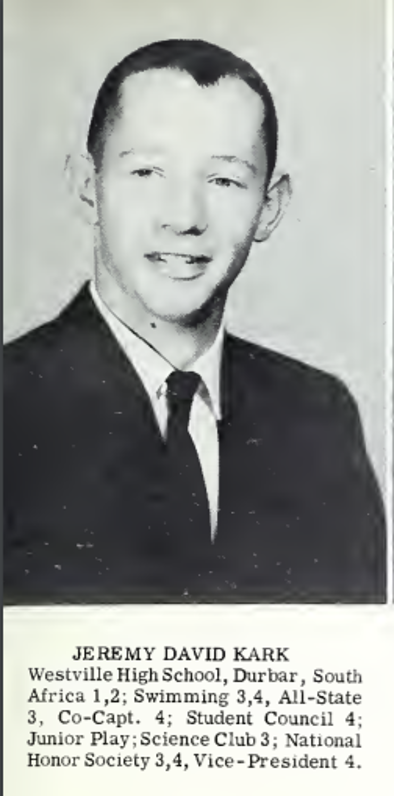
Jeremy Kark in the 1960 Chapel Hill High School Yearbook

In 2017–2018, Kark was presented with a Lifetime Achievement Award by the Israel Association of Public Health Physicians for his advancement of public health in Israel and around the world. In 2018, following Kark's death, his wife established “The Jeremy D. Kark Legacy Prize for Academic Excellence”, awarded annually to an International Master of Public Health (IMPH) student at the Hebrew University – Hadassah School of Public Health and Community Medicine in recognition of outstanding academic and research performance.

== Dissertations ==
- Kark, J. D. The distribution of serum uric acid in a sample of Israel Defense Forces recruits (1973–4) by several demographic, psychometric and somatic variables. Master of Public Health thesis. Hebrew University, Jerusalem, 1977.
- Kark, J. D. The relationship of serum vitamin A and serum cholesterol to the incidence of cancer in Evans County, Georgia. Doctoral dissertation (Ph.D.), University of North Carolina, Chapel Hill, N.C., 1977.

== Published works ==
- Boker, L. K., Twig, G., Klaitman-Meir, V., Derazne, E., Shina, A., Levine, H., & Kark, J. D. (2020). Adolescent characteristics and incidence of pre-malignant disease and invasive tumors of the cervix. International Journal of Gynecologic Cancer, ijgc-2019.
- Furer, A., Afek, A., Sommer, A., Keinan-Boker, L., Derazne, E., Levi, Z., ... & Kark, J. D. (2020). Adolescent obesity and midlife cancer risk: a population-based cohort study of 2· 3 million adolescents in Israel. The Lancet Diabetes & Endocrinology, 8(3), 216–225.
- Leiba, A., Twig, G., Vivante, A., Skorecki, K., Golan, E., Derazne, E.; Tzur, Grossman, E., Dichtiar, R., Kark, J. D., Shohat, T. (2017). Prehypertension among 2.19 million adolescents and future risk for end-stage renal disease. Journal of Hypertension. 35(6): 1290–1296.
- Twig, G., Yaniv, G., Levine, H., Leiba, A., Goldberger, N., Derazne, E., Ben-Ami Shor, D., Tzur, D., Afek, A., Shamiss, A. and Haklai, Z., (2016). Body-mass index in 2.3 million adolescents and cardiovascular death in adulthood. New England Journal of Medicine, 374(25), pp. 2430–2440.
- Ben-Dov, I.Z., Kark, J.D., Ben-Ishay, D., Mekler, J., Ben-Arie, L. and Bursztyn, M., (2007). Predictors of all-cause mortality in clinical ambulatory monitoring: unique aspects of blood pressure during sleep. Hypertension, 49(6), pp. 1235–1241.
- Guallar, E., Sanz-Gallardo, M.I., Veer, P.V.T., Bode, P., Aro, A., Gómez-Aracena, J., Kark, J.D., Riemersma, R.A., Martín-Moreno, J.M. and Kok, F.J., (2002). Mercury, fish oils, and the risk of myocardial infarction. New England Journal of Medicine, 347(22), pp. 1747–1754.
- Kohlmeier, L., Kark, J.D., Gomez-Gracia, E., Martin, B.C., Steck, S.E., Kardinaal, A.F., Ringstad, J., Thamm, M., Masaev, V., Riemersma, R. and Martin-Moreno, J.M., (1997). Lycopene and myocardial infarction risk in the EURAMIC Study. American Journal of Epidemiology, 146(8), pp. 618–626.
- Kark, J. D., Shemi, G., Friedlander, Y., Martin, O., Manor, O., & Blondheim, S. H. (1996). Does religious observance promote health? Mortality in secular vs religious kibbutzim in Israel. American Journal of Public Health, 86(3), 341–346.
- Kark, J. D., Goldman, S., & Epstein, L. (1995). Iraqi missile attacks on Israel: The association of mortality with a life-threatening stressor. Jama, 273(15), 1208–1210.
- Salomaa, V., Riley, W., Kark, J.D., Nardo, C. and Folsom, A.R., (1995). Non–insulin-dependent diabetes mellitus and fasting glucose and insulin concentrations are associated with arterial stiffness indexes: the ARIC study. Circulation, 91(5), pp. 1432–1443.

== See also ==
- Health care in Israel
