= Sidney Kark =

South African doctor

Sidney Lionel Kark
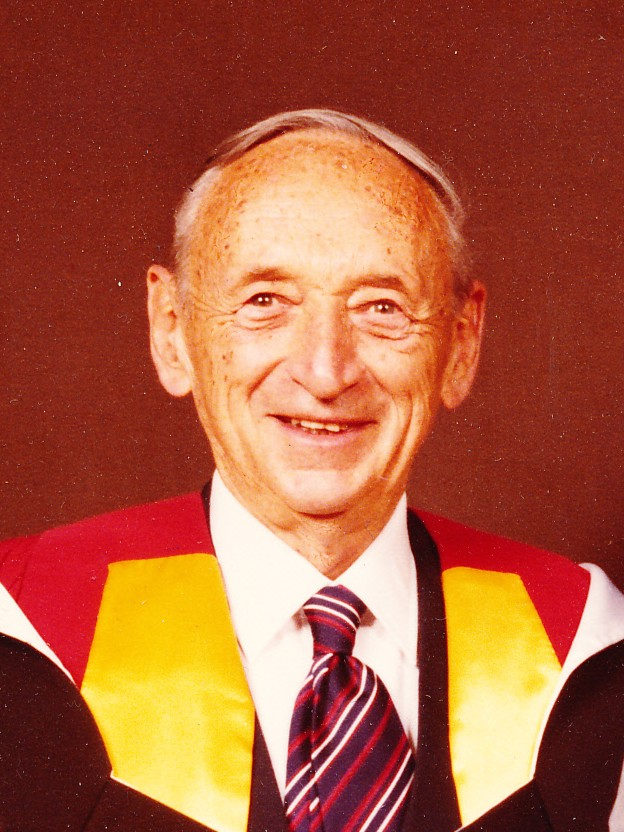
- Sidney Kark receiving his Honorary Doctorate of Science in Medicine at the University of the Witwatersrand in 1982
- Born: 22 October 1911; Johannesburg, South Africa
- Died: 18 April 1998 (aged 86); Jerusalem, Israel
- Occupations: Professor of Social Medicine and Public Health
- Spouse: Emily Kark
- Children: Carol Dawn Kark, Jeremy David Kark, and William Basil Kark

Academic background
- Education: University of the Witwatersrand

Academic work
- Discipline: Social Medicine, Public Health
- Sub-discipline: Community-Oriented Primary Care
- Institutions: Institute of Family and Community Health, Durban; University of Natal Medical School, Department of Social, Preventative and Family Medicine; University of North Carolina at Chapel Hill School of Public Health, Department of Epidemiology; Hadassah Medical School and Hebrew University of Jerusalem School of Public Health and Community Medicine

Sidney Lionel Kark (22 October 1911 – 18 April 1998) was a South African physician, epidemiologist, professor, and pioneer of social medicine and public health. Together with his wife, Dr Emily Kark, they developed the foundations of Community-Oriented Primary Care (COPC), a model of health care that integrates primary care with public health and community-based services. His work emphasised the social determinants of health, adopting a holistic approach that considered the wellbeing of individuals, families, and communities within their social and environmental contexts.

Kark's research and practice influenced the development of primary health care and community health services in South Africa and internationally. He is recognised as a pioneer of Community-Oriented Primary Care and for advancing equitable approaches to health care delivery across diverse populations.

== Early life and education ==
Sidney Lionel Kark was born in Johannesburg, South Africa in 1911 as the youngest of three children. His parents, Charles Ezekiel Kark and Annie Gertrude Kramer, were Jewish immigrants from Lithuania whose families had emigrated to South Africa in the late nineteenth century. Kark was a prefect at Parktown Boys' High School in Johannesburg and commenced medical studies at the University of the Witwatersrand (Wits) in 1929. His studies were interrupted by economic hardship that required him to work to support his family, after which he graduated in 1937 with an MBBCh from Wits Medical School.

While studying at Wits, Sidney met his future wife, Dr Emily Kark (née Jaspan) (MBBCh 1938), and the couple married after her graduation. Both were active in student-led organisations promoting community health, social justice and evidence-informed medical practice. Sidney was particularly engaged in advocating for equal rights for blacks, both before and during the apartheid era. Working together, they formed the Society for the Study of Medical Conditions among the Bantu in 1934, and Sidney was involved in additional progressive student organisations, including the National Union of South African Students and the Wits Students' Medical Council between 1932 and 1937. Sidney was an editor of the medical student journal The Leech, and was the first medical student to write an article on African medical problems, titled The economic factor in the health of the Bantu in South Africa.

During his studies, Sidney became aware that the clinical training that medical students received at the time did not provide the students with the tools that enabled them to address the health challenges prevalent in poor and under-privileged communities, especially within the South African black population, where access to health services was severely limited at the time. Kark was influenced by several liberal lecturers at Wits who were associated with the South African Institute of Race Relations, as well as the historian William Miller Macmillan, whose work examined how colonial policies had contributed to poverty and deprivation among African communities. Kark also studied with Eustace Cluver, a Professor of Public Health, who later became Secretary of the South African Department of Health.

After graduating, Kark spent two years in resident physician posts in medicine and pediatrics, and was also the house physician at the Transvaal Memorial Hospital for Children, Johannesburg in 1938. In the same year, he was appointed clinical medical officer for a year-long survey of the health and nutrition of black children, led by Cluver and his deputy, Dr Harry Gear. In 1940, Cluver recruited Drs Sidney and Emily Kark to establish the Pholela Community Health Centre in a rural Zulu community in Natal as a pioneering demonstration health centre and independent state health unit, with the aim of providing comprehensive primary health care to the local populations. The innovative model the Karks developed at Pholela in Natal was expanded during the 1940s and 1950s into a broader network of community health centres across South Africa and became the basis for the COPC model, which was later adopted internationally.

Kark worked closely with many different colleagues to develop and apply the COPC model, and viewed multi-discpilinary teamwork as an essential component of the practice. He collaborated with epidemiologists, physicians, nurses, and community health workers, as well as social scientists and health educators, who helped operationalise his vision in community health centres around the world.

The Karks' two eldest children, Carol Dawn Kark (1941–2017) and Jeremy David Kark (1943–2018), spent their early childhood in Pholela. Their third child, William Basil Kark, was born in Durban in 1946.

== Academic and medical career ==
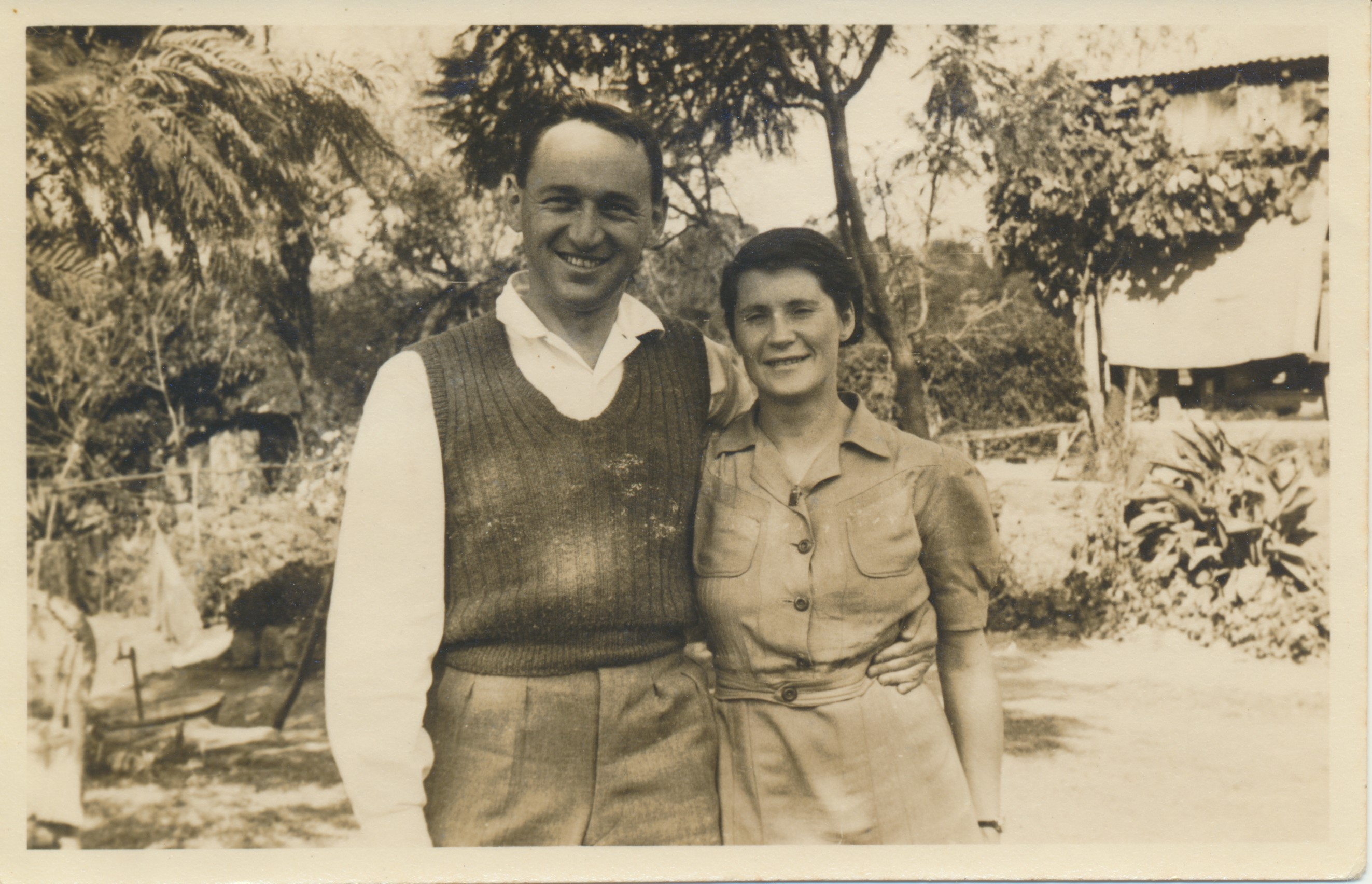
Sidney and Emily Kark in Pholela in the early 1940s

=== South Africa ===
Kark initiated and directed the Pholela Community Health Centre in a rural Zulu township in Natal, between 1940–1945. It served as an experimental community health centre, providing rural health services and training to health workers and the local community, and demonstrated the effectiveness of an integrated curative and preventive approach. The Karks implemented a range of innovative activities at the Pholela Community Health Centre, focusing not only on caring for individuals and families, but also on integrating training in diverse related areas, such as mothers and their young children, novel agricultural techniques such as home vegetable growing, contour ploughing, and composting, as well as working with the local community to establish seed-buying clubs, a farmers’ association, and local produce markets. During university vacations, parties of medical students would visit Pholela out of their own interest to engage in practical clinical training.

At the Pholela Health Centre, the Karks worked with a multi-disciplinary team of doctors, nurses, health assistants, and locally recruited community health workers to establish an innovative, comprehensive primary health care service focused on disease prevention, treatment, and health education. After their initial interactions with the local Zulu chiefs, the Karks included local community members in the health centre team, which helped build trust and enhance engagement with the local population. The centre integrated clinical care with community-based health promotion efforts, including home visits, health education, epidemiological surveys, and additional initiatives, shifting the focus from treating individual patients to improving the health of families and the wider community. At the Pholela Health Centre, the Karks and their team developed a novel concept of health care service in the form of a community health centre, which integrated individual-based treatment with preventative and other community health activities. Sidney learned to speak the Zulu language, IsiZulu, and the centre's medical team spoke with the locals in their own language.

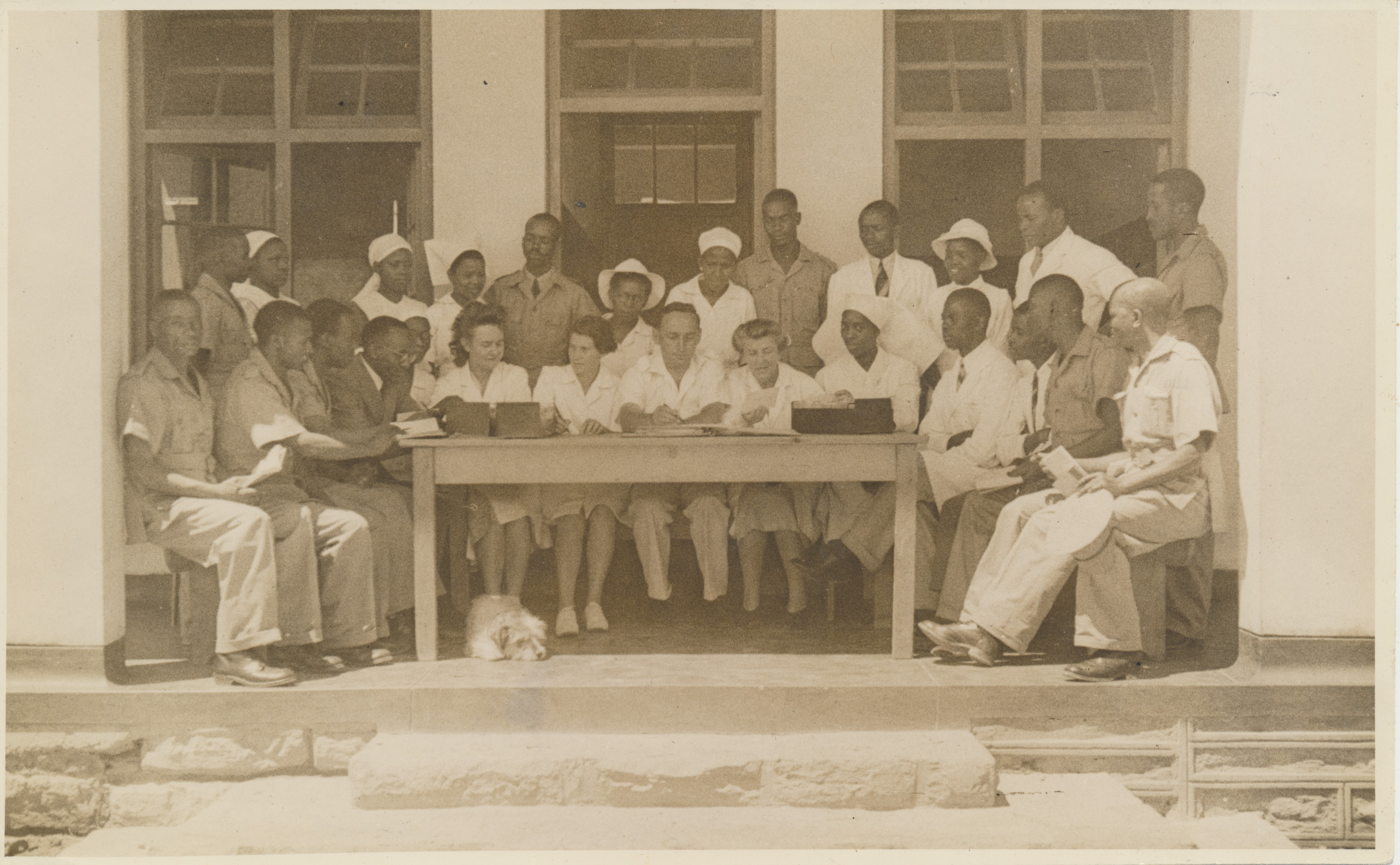
Pholela Health Centre staff (circa 1945): doctors, nurses, medical aids, nurse assistants, community health workers, and health recorders. Sidney Kark is seated at the centre

In 1944, the pioneering work of Sidney and Emily Kark in Pholela inspired the National Health Services Commission under Dr Henry Gluckman to recommend the establishment of a National Health Service, with 44 community health centres built based on the Pholela model, and more than 200 planned at the time. The Kark family moved to Durban in 1946, where Sidney Kark established and directed the Institute for Family and Community Health (IFCH) at the University of Natal, with support from Dr George Gale, who was Chief Health Officer to Gluckman, then Minister of Health. Between 1946 and 1957, Kark and his team established five additional health centres in and around Durban, providing integrated personal, family, and community health care services. The Institute became a pioneering multi-racial inclusive centre for health education and training, preparing health workers to serve diverse South African communities. The Institute was the first of its kind in South Africa which trained black students, and was established at the University of Natal, before the National Party won the 1948 election and began introducing the apartheid regime in South Africa.

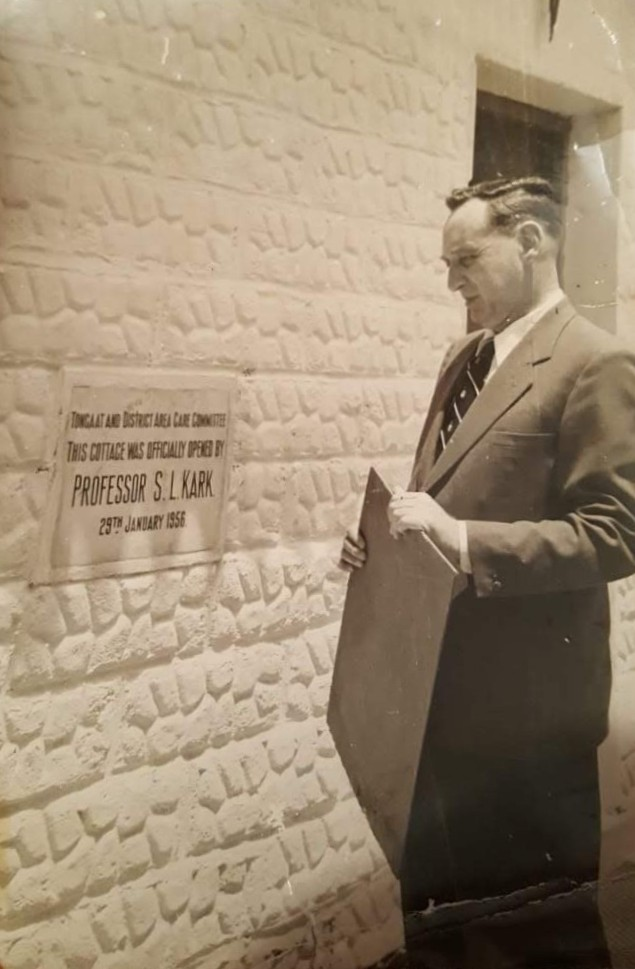
Sidney Kark unveiling a plaque at the opening of the Tongaat Community Health Centre in Natal (1956)

Together with Gale, who became the founding Dean of the University of Natal's Medical School in 1952, Kark helped establish the Department of Social, Preventative and Family Medicine at the University, and was appointed its first Professor of Social Medicine in 1956. He developed an innovative teaching curriculum that combined clinical medicine with preventative health care, community-based training, and the study of social, economic, cultural, and environmental influences on health and disease. The health centres, established through the Institute, also became teaching sites where medical students could gain practical hands-on experience in community health care.

During his appointment at the University of Natal, Kark also spent time as an invited Professor at the Institute of Social and Medicine and the Department of Anthropology at the University of Oxford (1947–1948), as well as the Hadassah Medical School in Jerusalem (1952–1953).

Throughout this period, Kark maintained a strong focus on research alongside his clinical and educational work. He integrated research with health care practice to investigate disease patterns, health services, and the social determinants of health among black populations in South Africa and other underserved communities. In 1954, Kark was awarded a postgraduate medical degree (MD) from the University of the Witwatersrand for his research on the Patterns of Health and Nutrition in the South African Bantu.

Following the establishment of the apartheid regime, the community health projects established by the Karks were criticised by the government, and were investigated for their involvement in educating and empowering 'non-white' students, nurses, and doctors. While the Karks did not consider themselves to be political activists, their commitment to a community-based and inclusive health care model reflected a liberal approach to medical practice that increasingly conflicted with apartheid policies.

By the late 1950s, growing government pressure, investigations, and restrictions forced the Karks and many of their colleagues to leave South Africa. The University of Natal Medical School had become a frequent site of conflict with the apartheid government. In 1957, after the government introduced legislation seeking greater control over the medical school, Kark resigned from his position amid increasing restrictions on academic and professional independence.

Following the end of apartheid in the 1990s, the Karks' work that began in Pholela in the 1940s was revived and embraced by South African public health leaders and influenced the development of the country's post-1994 primary health care policy. During an invited visit to South Africa in 1992, Sidney and Emily Kark met with senior health policymakers, including future Minister of Health Nkosazana Dlamini-Zuma, who had grown up in Pholela. Their model of Community-Oriented Primary Care was widely promoted at the time as a foundation for the new South African health system, and the Pholela Health Centre was rebuilt in 2001. Although there were implementation challenges during this period due to workforce shortages, administrative challenges and the HIV/AIDS epidemic, the Pholela model has continued to be regarded as a landmark in the history of primary health care and social medicine internationally and is still active.

=== United States ===
In July 1958, the Karks left South Africa and travelled to the United States of America aboard the Robin Sherwood. Kark was invited by his former student and Pholela team member, Professor John Cassel, to become the founding chair of the Department of Epidemiology at the School of Public Health at the University of North Carolina at Chapel Hill (UNC). Drawing on two decades of experience in South Africa, and working alongside colleagues from the Pholela Health Centre who had also moved to the United States, Kark developed the Master of Public Health (MPH) and Doctor of Public Health (DPH) degrees at UNC in 1959, offering majors in epidemiology to postgraduate students. He continued his collaboration with Cassel and served as an adjunct and visiting professor at UNC for many years.

Throughout his career, Kark trained generations of researchers, physicians, nurses and community health workers in South Africa and internationally. The approaches and model developed at the Pholela Health Centre influenced the development of community medicine in the United States, where public health physicians such as H. Jack Geiger drew on the Karks' work in expanding access to community health care services. Having experienced and studied the Pholela model and being mentored by Sidney in South Africa, Geiger described Kark as having had a formative influence on the United States community health centre movement, referring to him as a "mentor, friend, and consultant to a generation of American community-health workers".

=== Israel ===
The Karks arrived in Jerusalem in 1959, on commission from the World Health Organization, where Sidney established the Department of Social Medicine at the Hebrew University of Jerusalem and Hadassah Medical Center, along with a multi-disciplinary team of colleagues from Pholela and Durban, South Africa. Within several years, the department was recognised as the first school of public health in Israel, and with the support and foresight of Kalman J. Mann, the Director General of the Hadassah Medical Organization, Kark developed a Master of Public Health (MPH) program with a strong focus on COPC and epidemiology. This included both an International Master of Public Health for students from around the world and a Master of Public Health for local students. The program has since graduated over a thousand students from over 100 countries, contributing to global public health capacity through the training of public health professionals from around the world.

Sidney and Emily Kark became influential figures in the development of public health teaching, epidemiology, and health care in Israel, and continued to develop and actively promote the COPC model. Their work helped adapt the principles first developed at Pholela in South Africa to the Israeli health system and to new community health challenges, following immigrations of large communities from North Africa and the Middle East to Israel in the 1950s.

Kark introduced and further developed the principles of COPC through the Hadassah Community Health Centre founded in Kiryat HaYovel, Jerusalem. Established in 1953 as a pilot centre for teaching and research in community health, the centre was modelled on the approach developed at Pholela Health Centre in South Africa. Also known as "Little Hadassah", it became a site where COPC was practised, evaluated, demonstrated, and taught to international and local students from multiple disciplines, including medicine, nursing, sociology and public health.

=== International ===
Kark held multiple visiting professorships at universities across Africa, Europe, and the United States, participated in many international conferences on public and community health, and served as a health advisor in various parts of the world. He was a consultant to the World Health Organization (WHO) on several projects, and served on the WHO Expert Advisory Panel on Health Services and Manpower Development. Kark also contributed to the WHO's Scientific Group on Research in Public Health Practice, supporting the development, coordination, and organisation of research initiatives in public health practice that informed international approaches to health service delivery.

== Community-Oriented Primary Care ==
The Karks' development of the Community-Oriented Primary Care (COPC) model was shaped by their broad and holistic understanding of the social, economic, cultural, and environmental determinants of health. This perspective was shaped in part by his education at the University of the Witwatersrand in the 1930s, exposure to liberal scholars in the Arts Faculty, his socialist outlook, and his early exposure to the social and political implications of migrant labour, during his work on the national nutritional survey of African schoolchildren. These experiences contributed to his view that health conditions could not be examined in isolation from the broader circumstances of individuals and the communities in which they live. This understanding of the causal factors and the inter-relationships among different health conditions led to Kark’s concept of community health syndromes, which found practical expression through his work in Pholela.

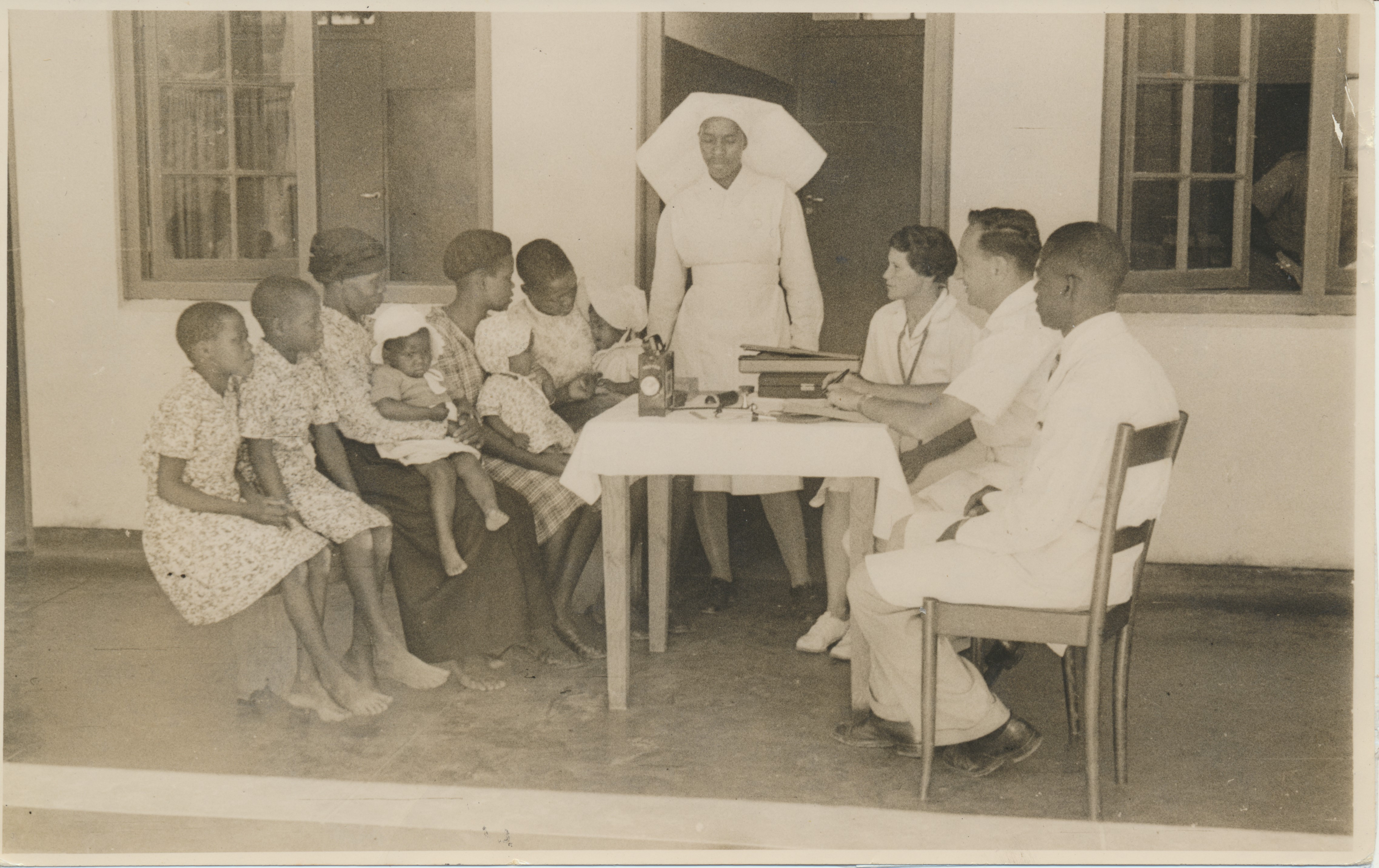
Family consultation with women at the Pholela Health Centre (circa 1942) to discuss their children's health.

Kark became committed to social medicine during his period at Pholela working with the Zulu community, and continued to contribute to the concept of Community-Oriented Primary Care throughout his life. His work integrated curative and preventative health services, and was aimed at identifying, implementing, and assessing the impact of health interventions in the local community. He is regarded as one of the twentieth century's leading figures in social medicine, and several of his early publications were republished in major public health journals after his passing in recognition of their enduring significance. As described in the University of the Witwatersand's citation of Kark's honorary doctorate in 1982, Professor Sidney Kark "contributed immeasurably, in many countries, to the alleviation of human suffering and the promotion of human health and welfare."

The community health centre practises developed by the Karks directly contributed to what later became known as the primary health care approach internationally. Kark's seminal influence on health care reform was also recognised as anticipating and contributing towards the 1978 Declaration of Alma-Ata, which endorsed Community Oriented Primary Care as a key policy for national governments and international organisations. In a memoir written by one his colleagues, Kark is said to have "assembled the girders on which, at some remove, the famous declaration of Alma Ata rests."

== Awards and commemoration ==
During his life, Kark received honours recognising his contributions to social medicine, public health, and medical education, such as:

- Robert H. Felix Distinguished Service Award in Community Health/Community Medicine, Saint Louis University School of Medicine (1979).
- Honorary Doctorate of Science in Medicine from the University of the Witwatersrand (1982).
- Honorary Doctorate of Science in Medicine from the University of Natal (1986).

In 1992, the Department of Epidemiology at the UNC Gillings School of Global Public Health established the Sidney Kark Award for Distinguished Teaching Assistant. Named in his honour as one of the department's founding figures, the award recognises graduate students who demonstrate outstanding commitment and excellence in teaching.

== Books ==
Kark published over one hundred research papers, books, and monographs during his career. These include seminal textbooks on epidemiology and Community-Oriented Primary Care, as well as an autobiography co-authored with his wife, Dr Emily Kark.

- Kark, S.L. & Steuart G.W. (1962). A practice of social medicine: A South African team's experiences in different African communities. Edinburgh: E&S Livingstone.
- Kark, S.L. (1974). Epidemiology and community medicine. New York: Appleton-Century-Crofts.
- Kark, S.L. (1981). The practice of community-oriented primary health care. New York: Appleton-Century-Crofts.
- Kark, S.L., Kark, E., Abramson, J.H., & Gofin., J. (1994). Atención primaria orientada a la comunidad. Barcelona: Doyma.
- Kark, S.L. & Kark, E. (1999). Promoting community health: From Pholela to Jerusalem. Johannesburg: Witwatersrand University Press.
