= St. Vincent-Ein Kerem =

Saint Vincent-Ein Kerem is a home for physically and mentally handicapped children in Israel.

== History ==
Saint Vincent was founded in 1954 at Ein Kerem, on the edge of Jerusalem. It is a non-profit enterprise operated by the Daughters of Charity of Saint Vincent de Paul. The home cares for disabled children with the help of volunteers from around the world.
