= Ronit Kark =

Organisational psychologist and academic

- רונית קרק
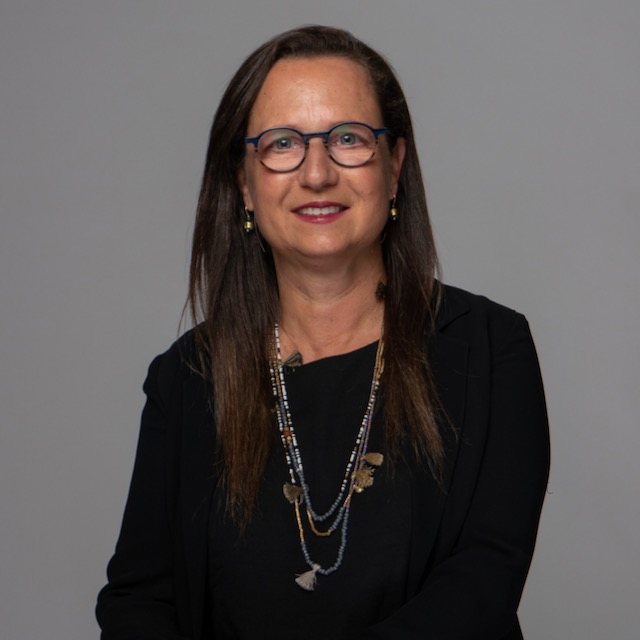
- Occupations: Professor of Social and Organizational Psychology
- Parent(s): Jeremy Kark, Ruth Kark

Academic work
- Discipline: Social and Organizational Psychology; Organizational Behavior

Ronit Kark (Hebrew: רונית קרק) is a full professor of leadership and organizational psychology in the Department of Psychology at Bar-Ilan University, Israel, and the founder and former director of the 'Gender in the Field' Graduate Program at the Gender Studies department of Bar-Ilan. She is a distinguished research professor at the University of Exeter Business School and an affiliate scholar at the Center For Gender in Organizations (CGO) at Simmons University, Boston.

== Education ==
Kark completed her B.Sc. in biology and psychology in 1992 at The Hebrew University of Jerusalem. She obtained her M.A. in social and organizational psychology in 1995 and completed her Ph.D. in 2000, at the Department of Psychology, The Hebrew University of Jerusalem. Kark's Ph.D. thesis focused on gender, leadership and identification processes. In 2001, Kark completed her postdoctoral studies at the University of Michigan at Ann Arbor, hosted by the Institute for Research on Women and Gender.

== Career and research ==
Kark joined the faculty of Bar-Ilan University in 2002 and received the rank of Full Professor in 2018.

She was the founder and first director of the graduate program ‘Gender in the Field: Linking Theory and Practice’ in the Gender Studies Department of Bar-Ilan University.

In 2014, Kark was a visiting scholar at the University of Queensland Business School and Department of Psychology, Australia.

Since 2014, she has been an affiliate scholar at the Center For Gender in Organizations (CGO) at Simmons University, Boston.

In 2019, Kark became an affiliated distinguished research professor at the University of Exeter Business School.

Her editorial responsibilities include serving as a consulting editor, International Journal of Management Reviews (2007 to date); associate editor, The Leadership Quarterly (2017 to date); editorial board member of various leading journals, including the Academy of Management Journal, Academy of Management Review, Academy of Management Discoveries, Frontiers in Psychology and Cambridge Elements in Leadership.

Kark's research interests include leadership and followership, positive relationships and relatedness in organizations, identity and identification processes, gender and leadership, and leading for creativity.

== Selected publications ==
=== Scientific publications ===
Kark has authored or co-authored over 90 scientific publications. Publications with over 200 citations are (in descending order of citations):

- "The two faces of transformational leadership: Empowerment and dependency"
- "Motivation to Lead, Motivation to Follow: The Role of the Self-Regulatory Focus in Leadership Processes"
- "Alive and creating: the mediating role of vitality and aliveness in the relationship between psychological safety and creative work involvement"
- "The Dual Effect of Transformational Leadership: Priming Relational and Collective Selves and Further Effects on Followers"
- "Leadership and followership identity processes: A multilevel review"
- "Does valuing androgyny and femininity lead to a female advantage? The relationship between gender-role, transformational leadership and identification"
- "The transformational leader: who is (s)he? A feminist perspective"
- "Leading by example: The case of leader OCB"
- "Creative leadership: A multi-context conceptualization"
- "A single-item graphic scale for the measurement of organizational identification"
- "Motivated or demotivated to be creative: The role of self‐regulatory focus in transformational and transactional leadership processes"
- "How do transformational leaders transform organizations? A study of the relationship between leadership and entrepreneurship"
- "The impact of situational vulnerability on the development and erosion of followers' trust in their leader"
- "Gender and leadership: Negotiating the labyrinth"

=== Praxis publications ===
- "How Women Manage the Gendered Norms of Leadership"
- "Fake it though you’ve made it: battling leader impostorism"
- "What Makes an Inclusive Leader?"

== Impact ==
Scientific publications authored or co-authored by Kark have received over 9,000 citations in scientific literature.

Other scientists have built on the work of Kark and her co-authors. For instance, Kark and Van Dijk's paper "Motivation to Lead, Motivation to Follow: The Role of the Self-Regulatory Focus in Leadership Processes" formed one of the inputs to a series of studies carried out and documented by Russell Johnson et al. In their conclusion, the authors wrote: "Across five studies, we demonstrated how leader regulatory focus is capable of trickling down and triggering a comparable regulatory focus in followers. We provided empirical support for Kark and Van Dijk’s (2007) untested conceptual propositions that transformational and management by exception behaviors mediate leader–follower foci relations."

The mainstream media have carried a number of articles about the work of Kark and her co-authors. They include:

- "'Be strong, but in a nice way': how female managers deal with the paradox of female management", published in the Israeli financial newspaper Globes.
- "Managing leaders with impostor syndrome", published in the Kenyan business newspaper Business Daily.
- "Girls at the center study high-tech professions for personal fulfillment; In the periphery, for money", published in the Israeli business newspaper TheMarker.

== Awards and distinctions ==
- 2000: Loreal-Recanati Prize for the Study of Women and Management in Israel
- 2005: Best Paper Prize (second place) from the International Leadership Association (ILA)
- 2011: Best Paper Award for the 9th International Academy of Management and Business (IAMB) conference (with Dina Van Dijk)
- 2012: Academy of Management Award for Scholarly Contributions to Educational Practice Advancing Women in Leadership
- 2016: Bar-Ilan University Rector Prize for Outstanding Research Achievements
- 2016: Iconic Leaders in Social Enterprise prize from the All Ladies League (ALL) Women Economic Forum
- 2016: Academy of Management Annals Best 2015 Published Article Award (Honorable Mention) (with Olga Epitropaki and Charalampos Mainemelis)
- 2019: Forbes Magazine's "Top 10 Creative Leadership Books From 2018" included the book "Creative Leadership: Contexts and Prospects" by Mainemelis, Epitropaki and Kark
- 2021: Kark was included in the top 2% percentile of academics most cited by the Stanford University and Elsevier data list
- 2022: Technical University of Munich (TUM) Anna Boyksen Fellowship Award for Outstanding professors in the field of gender and diversity
- 2022: Sam and Bonnie Rechter Fellowship Award from the University of Louisville College of Business's Project on Positive Leadership
- 2025: Societal Impact Award from the Academy of Management Organizational Behavior Division

== See also ==
- Creative leadership
