= Carem =

Town mentioned in the Septuagint

Coordinates: 31°46′04.53″N 35°09′47.48″E

Carem or Karem is a place mentioned in the Septuagint translation of the Hebrew Bible as being a town situated in the hill country of the tribe of Judah, while the Masoretic Text and Vulgate do not mention the name (see Joshua 15:59).

== Identification ==
According to the Catholic Encyclopedia, Carem has been identified by some scholars with Beit HaKerem (Bethhaccerem), a town that is mentioned in the biblical Book of Jeremiah 6:1 and Book of Nehemiah 3:14.

It is most often associated with Ein Karem, a town currently included in the municipality of Jerusalem.

From the twelfth century CE onward there are many Christian writers who claim that Carem/Ein Karem was the "city of Judah" in the "hill country" mentioned in Luke 1:39, the home of Zechariah and Elizabeth, parents of John the Baptist, where Elizabeth received the visit of her cousin, the Virgin Mary. The tradition thus identifies Ein Karem as the birthplace of John the Baptist. Many Christians cite the existence of manuscripts as evidence in favour of this tradition. However, early writers such as St. Jerome and later scholars like Baronius contradict this theory by citing the breadth of the term 'city of Judah' and the unlikelihood that it necessarily refers to this particular city.

== See also ==
- Ayn Karim
