= Westville Girls' High School =

Location
- Westville Road; Westville, KwaZulu-Natal; South Africa
- Coordinates: 29°50′14″S 30°55′00″E

Information
- Type: Private school
- Motto: Latin: Incepto ne desistam ("Stay the course" or "May I not shrink from my purpose" from Virgil's Aeneid)
- Established: January 1964
- Principal: Russell Untiedt
- Grades: 8 to 12
- Gender: Girls
- Colours: Navy blue, maroon and white
- Houses: 8
- Website: wghs.co.za

Westville Girls' High School,(or WGHS), is a state school for girls in Westville, KwaZulu-Natal, South Africa.

Classes are split based on the students’ academic ability, in order to help all students achieve their maximum potential. Teaching styles are adapted to learners' needs, and auxiliary lessons (and workshops for grades 10 to 12) are offered in both Mathematics and Physical Science after school. The school offers a variety of subjects to learners when they make their subject choices in Grade 9, and assists with guidance from a career guidance counsellor as well as optional aptitude tests. Elective subjects that are offered include: Business Studies, Physical Science, Life Science, History, Geography, Visual Arts, Dramatic Arts and Accounting. Lessons are taught in English Home Language, but isiZulu and Afrikaans are offered as First Additional languages.

The school has an extensive awards policy and recognises certain pupils who exceed in academics, sports and cultural activities. One of the school's mottos is "dignity in diversity," which refers not only to different cultures, but to different talents that students might have. Students receive merit certificates, scrolls, half colours or full colours in all three activities based in their performance. Sports Union Awards, as well as the new Arts Academy awards, are put in place to ensure that students who excel in activities outside of school are recognised for their achievements. The school tries its best to recognise learners' achievements in fields that the school cannot offer, for example ice skating, horse-riding or ballet, and the awards policy is fluid and ever-changing to accommodate this.

Academic and meritorious achievement colours are in the form of blue, white and red cord which is sewn around the edge and pockets of the uniform blazer. Sports colours are in the form of maroon cord. Cultural (mostly performing arts) colours are in the form of a white cord. Half colours and full colours recipients receive scrolls which are sewn on to the blazer. Colours Cum Laude and Honours Blazers are also awarded, but to learners who have excelled at a high level in their activity (e.g.: U16 South African Netball team, U16 KZN Softball Team). These two awards are the highest and most prestigious awards.

The school was founded in January 1964 with 219 pupils, when Westville High School was split into two single-sex schools, and has grown to the around 1100 pupils.

It has a house system with eight houses. The houses were named after iconic women of history;

- Sisulu (yellow),
- Courtenay-Latimer (dark blue),
- Sneddon (red),
- Gordimer (pink),
- Makeba (green) and
- Campbell (purple).

In 2011 new houses were added to accommodate the growing rise of students. These are

- Meer (turquoise) and
- Maxeke (orange).

The school offers leadership positions which are mostly reserved for grade 10 to 12, but some are offered to students as young as grade 8. The leadership teaches responsibility and accountability, and allows for the school to be run in a more student-centred way. Leadership positions include monitors (library, IT help, art, drama and careers) as well as human resources and public relations. There is a learner management team with a select number of learners, mostly in their grade 11 and 12 years.

The emblem of the WGHS badge is a shield, quartered by the red cross of St. George. In the upper left-hand quarter is the griffin taken from the coat of arms of Martin West, the first Lieutenant-Governor of the Colony of Natal, after whom Westville is named. In legend, griffins are portrayed with a lion's body, an eagle's head, long ears, and an eagle's claws, to indicate that one must combine intelligence with strength. The upper right and lower left divisions contain the Book of Knowledge and the Lamp of Learning respectively. Represented in the lower right quarter is the familiar historic monument, the Outspan Tree, which is in Jan Hofmeyr Road, where the ox-wagons made their first stop after leaving Durban.

The school's motto Incepto ne Desistam means "May I not Shrink from my Purpose" or more colloquially, "stay the course."

Westville Girls High School celebrated its 50th birthday in 2014 which it celebrated with occasions such as an Old Girls' dinner and a fun day which was hosted by the Grade 8 classes.
