= Ein Karem =

Neighborhood in Jerusalem

Ein Karem עין כרם (Hebrew) عين كارم (Arabic)
- Neighborhood of Jerusalem
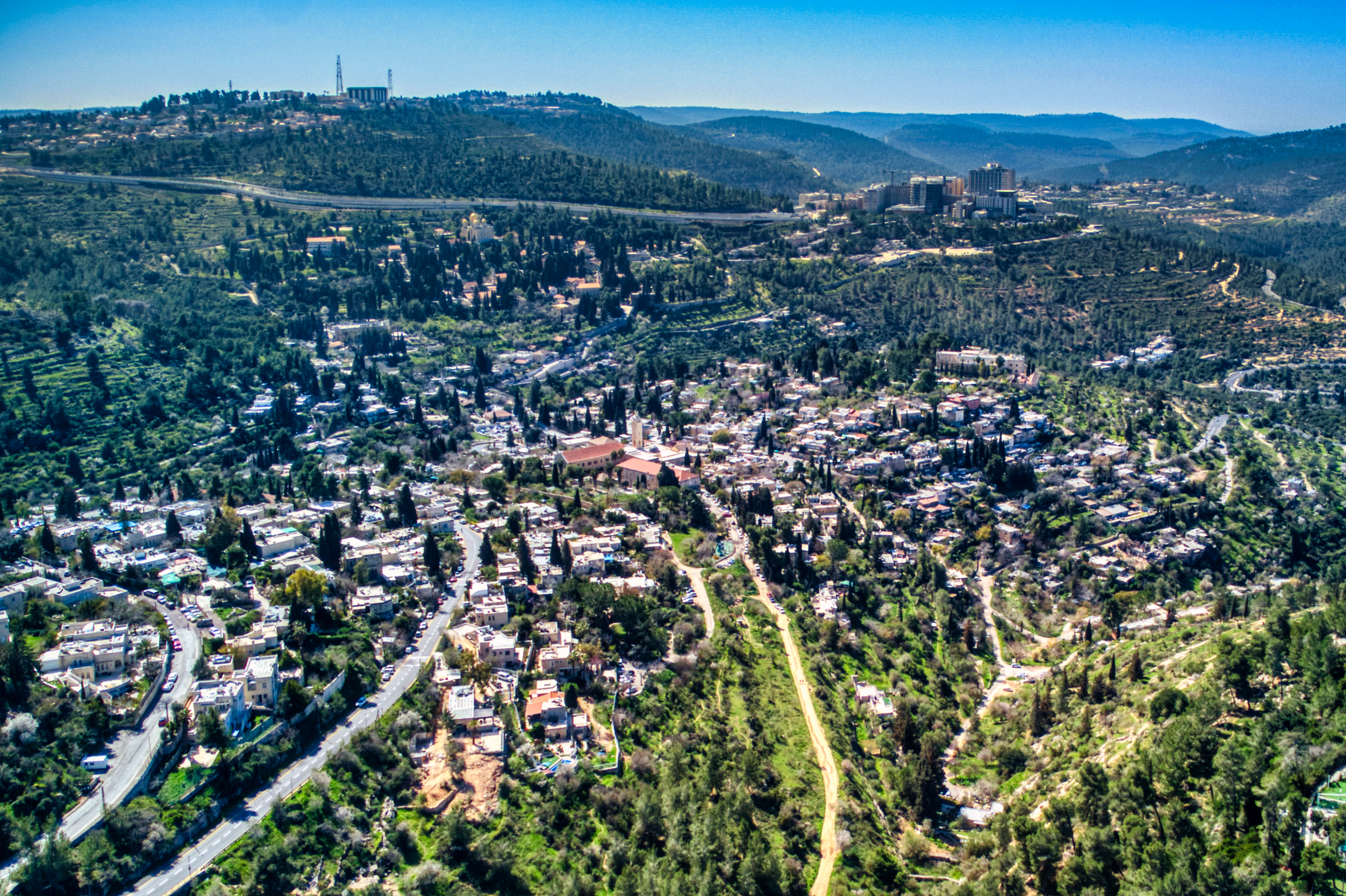
- View of Ein Karem
- Interactive map of Ein Karem
- Coordinates: 31°46′5″N 35°9′44″E
- Country: Israel
- District: Jerusalem
- City: Jerusalem
- Founded: Middle Bronze Age

Population (2017)
  - Total: 1,620

'Ayn Karim
- Village
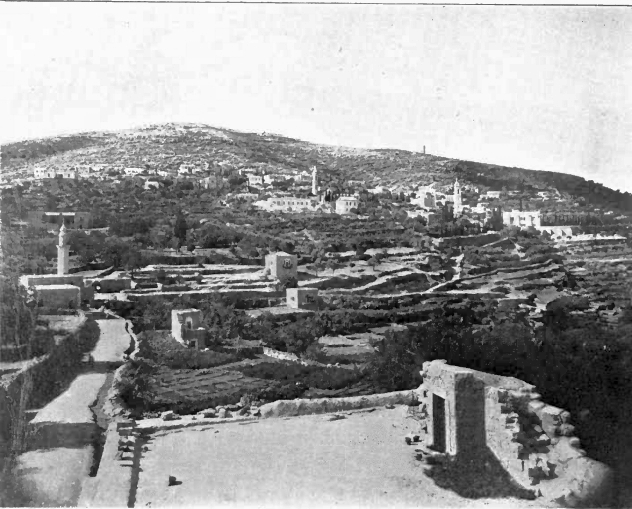

- Location within Israel
- Palestine grid: 165/130
- Date of depopulation: 10 and 21 April 1948, 16 July 1948

Area
  - Total: 15,029 dunams (15.029 km^{2}; 5.803 sq mi)
- Elevation: 650 m (2,130 ft)

Population (1948)
  - Total: 3,689
- Cause(s) of depopulation: Influence of nearby town's fall
- Secondary cause: Arab–Israeli War
- Current Localities: Ein Karem Beit Zayit, Even Sapir

Ein Karem (Hebrew: עין כרם, romanized: ʿEin Kārem; Arabic: عين كارم, romanized: ʿAyn Kārim) also Ein Kerem or Ain Karem, is a former Palestinian village southwest of Jerusalem, presently a neighborhood in the outskirts of the modern city, within the Jerusalem District in Israel. It is the site of the Hadassah Medical Center.

Ein Karem was an important Jewish village during the late Second Temple period, during which it became important to Christianity. Christian tradition holds that John the Baptist was born in Ein Karem, following the biblical verse in Luke saying John's family lived in a "town in the hill country of Judea". Probably because of its location between Bethlehem and Jerusalem, this location was a very comfortable one for a pilgrimage, and this led to the establishment of many churches and monasteries in the area.

During the years of Ottoman and later British Mandate, Ein Karem was a Palestinian Arab village. It was depopulated during the 1948 Arab-Israeli War. After the war it became once again a Jewish settlement. Today, Ein Karem is a vibrant bohemian neighborhood of Jerusalem, with a population of 2,000 (2010).

It has retained a very high-level of authenticity, its natural environment remains intact, and its old houses are still inhabited and preserved. It attracts three million visitors a year, one-third of them pilgrims from around the world. Alongside its religious landmarks, Ein Karem is also known for its fine art, culinary, and musical scenes.

== Etymology ==
The name Ein Karem or Ein Kerem can be literally translated from both Hebrew and Arabic as "Spring of the Vineyard". It is derived from the springs and vineyards established on the village's terraced slopes.

Another possible translation would be "Spring of Carem", if derived from an ancient Iron Age Israelite city called Carem, mentioned as a city in the dominion of the tribe of Judah in the Septuagint version of Book of Joshua. In Arabic, other than meaning "Spring of the Vineyard", it could be understood as well as "the Generous Spring".

== History ==
A spring that provides water to the village of Ein Karem stimulated settlement there from an early time.

=== Bronze Age ===
Pottery has been found near the spring dating to the Middle Bronze Age.

=== Iron Age/Israelite period ===
During the Iron Age, or Israelite period, Ein Karem is usually identified as the location of the biblical village of Beth HaKerem (Jeremiah 6:1; Nehemiah 3:14).

=== Second Temple period ===
A well-preserved mikveh (Jewish ritual bath) indicates there was a Jewish settlement in the Second Temple period along with some other discoveries such as handful of graves, bits of a wall, and an olive press. A reservoir here was mentioned in the Copper Scroll, one of the Dead Sea Scrolls.

=== Roman and Byzantine periods ===
During excavations in the Church of Saint John the Baptist, a marble statue of Aphrodite (or Venus) was found, broken in two. It is believed to date from the Roman era and was probably toppled in Byzantine times. Today, the statue is at the Rockefeller Museum. Excavations in front of the same church, which has at its core the cave which Christian tradition identifies as the birthplace of John the Baptist, have unearthed remains of two Byzantine chapels, one containing an inscription mentioning Christian "martyrs", but without any mention of John. Ceramics from the Byzantine period have also been found in Ein Karem.

In the Byzantine period, as part of the establishment of the "Liturgy of Jerusalem", Ein Karem was identified with the "Visitation", an event mentioned in the New Testament where Mary, expecting Jesus, encountered her cousin Elizabeth, who was pregnant with John the Baptist. Byzantine sources link Ein Karem with the residence of Elizabeth, the mother of John the Baptist, a place not specified in the New Testament. In around 530 CE, the Christian pilgrim Theodosius places Elizabeth's town at a distance of five miles (8.0 km) from Jerusalem, which suits Ein Karem.

=== Early Islamic period ===
Ein Karem was recorded after the Islamic conquest. Al-Tamimi, the physician (d. 990), refers to a church in Ein Karem that was venerated by Christians, and notes a particular plant he collected there.

=== Crusader period ===
It is mentioned under the name St. Jehan de Bois, "Saint John in the Mountains", during the Crusades. The Crusaders were the first to build here a church dedicated to St John, rebuilt in the 17th century by the Franciscans and still active today, and Moshe Sharon considers it as "almost sure" that the Crusaders are the ones who started the tradition of identifying that particular site as St John's birthplace.

=== Ayyubid and Mamluk periods ===
After conquering Jerusalem in 1187, Saladin granted the village of Ein Karem to Abu Maydan, a renowned Sufi teacher from Seville, Andalusia. Abu Madyan had fought in the 1187 Battle of Hattin against the Crusaders before returning to the Maghreb, where he eventually died in Tlemcen, in what is today Algeria. A document, drafted in Jerusalem in 1320 (720 AH) by Abu Maydan's great-grandson, outlines the waqf's holdings, beginning with Ein Karem:

"A village known by the name of Ein Karem, one of the villages adjacent to Jerusalem. This village includes farmed and fallow lands, both cultivated and abandoned, slopes and plains, unproductive bare rock, buildings in ruins, farmhouses, buildings in good repair with their surrounding fields, a little garden, pomegranate trees and other kinds irrigated with water from springs on the property, olive trees of a "rumi" or western variety, carob trees, fig trees, sessile oaks, qiqebs (hardwoods). This village is bounded on all sides: to the south by the great Maliha (salt pan); to the north by properties belonging to Ein-Kaout, Qalunya, Harash, Sataf, and Zawiya el-Bakhtyari; to the west by Ein Esheshqqaq, and to the east by properties belonging to the Maliha and to Beit Mazmil. This village is established as a waqf, with all attendant rights, appurtenances, fields, cultivated lands, threshing floors, loamy earth, with freshwater springs on location, prairies, planted trees, disused wells, vineyards, in a word, with all rights relating thereto, both within and without. However, the mosque, house of God, the path and the cemetery intended for use by Muslims, are not included in the present waqf."

The Waqf Abu Maydan endowment, which included the Mughrabi Quarter in Jerusalem, has been supported by agricultural and property revenues from the village of Ein Karem until the 1948 war.

A coin from the reign of As-Salih Hajji (1389 CE) was found here, together with pottery, glassware and other coins from the Mamluk era.

=== Ottoman period ===
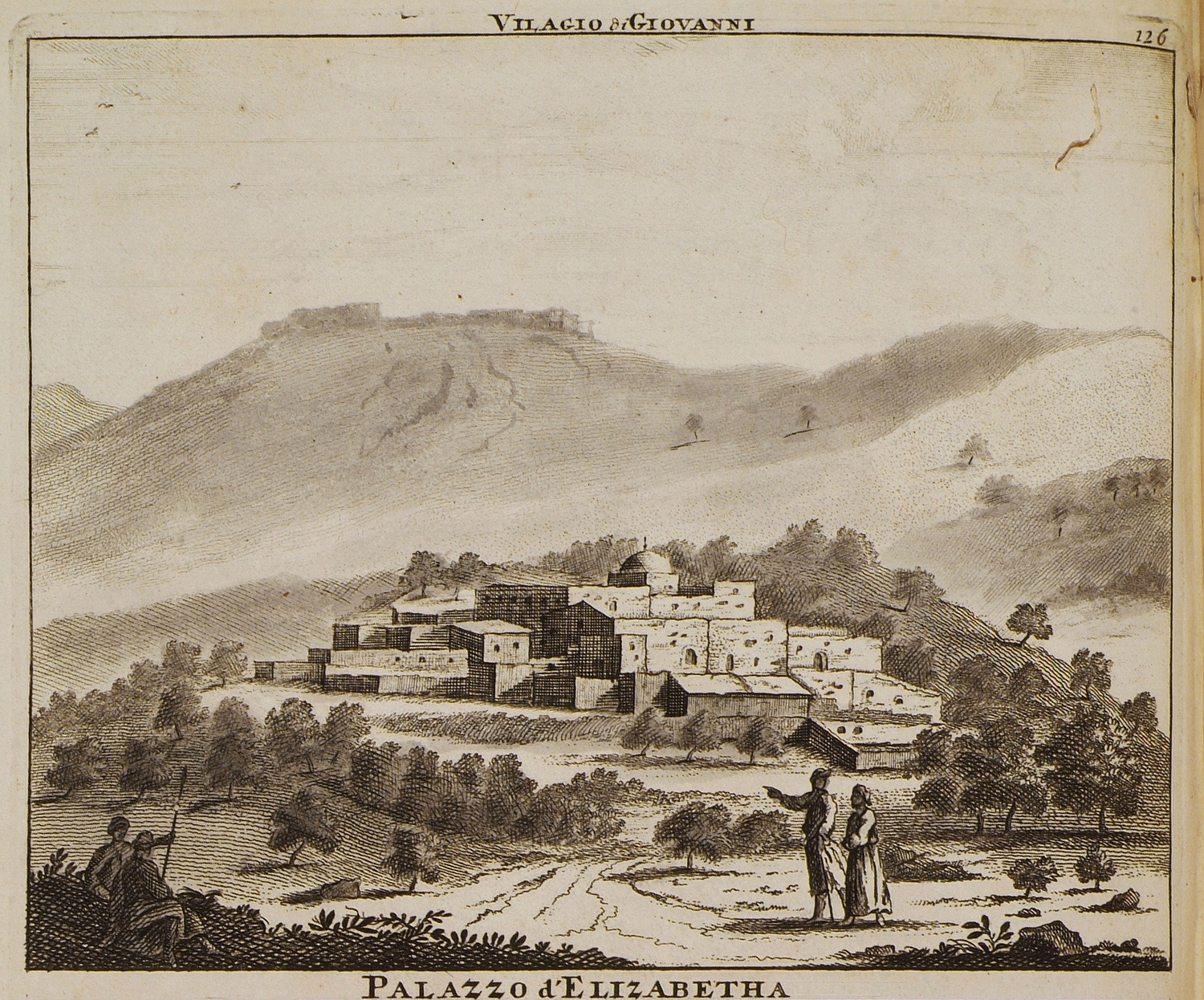
Ain Karim in 1681 by Cornelis de Bruijn

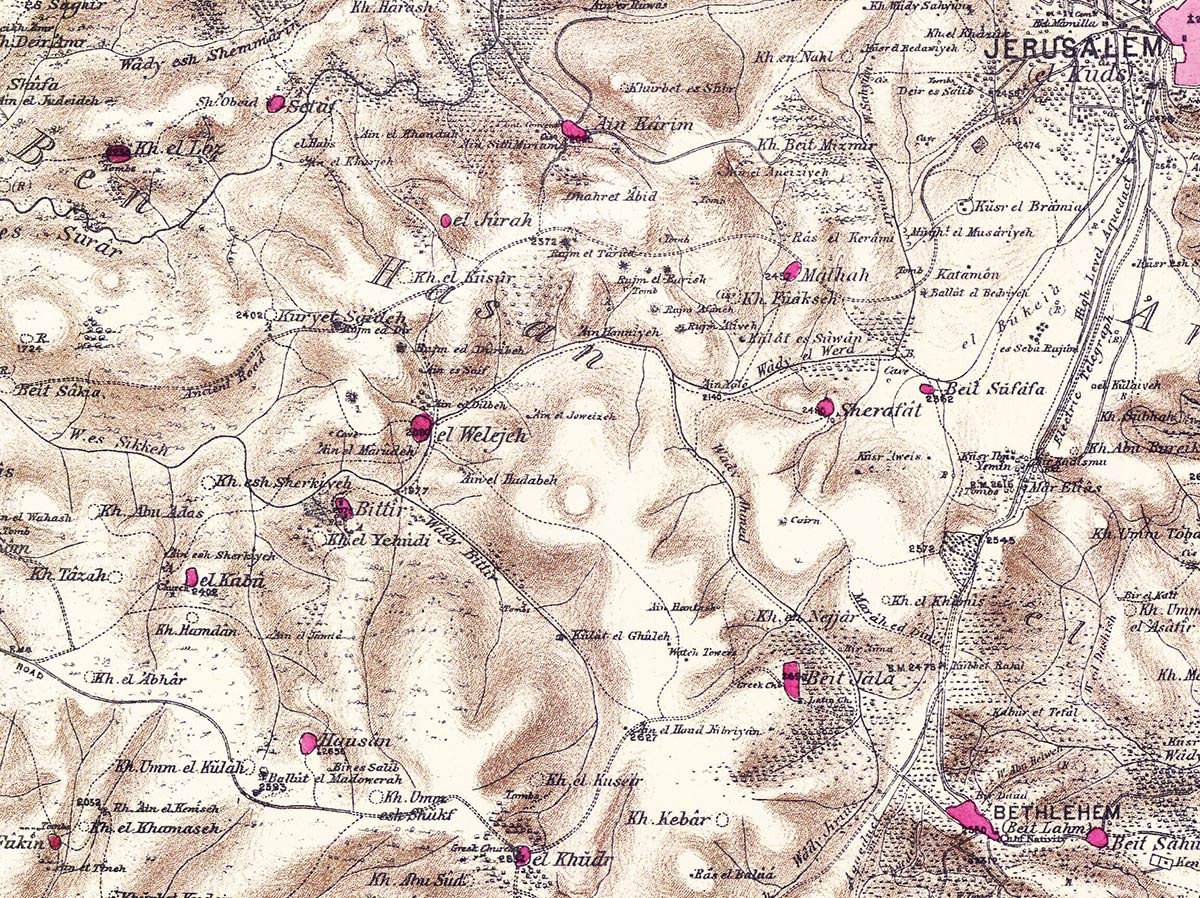
Ain Karim area in the 1870s

Most of the village – some 15,000 dunams – was waqf land set aside charitably to benefit the Moroccan Muslim community in Jerusalem, belonging to the endowment established by Abu Madyan in the 14th century.

In 1517, the village was included in the Ottoman Empire with the rest of Palestine and in the 1596 tax-records it appeared as 'Ain Karim, located in the Nahiya of Jabal Quds of the Liwa of Al-Quds. The village had at this time 29 households, all Muslim. The villagers paid a fixed tax rate of 33.3% on agricultural products, which included wheat, barley, summer crops, vineyards, grape syrup/molasse, goats and beehives in addition to "occasional revenues"; a total of 5,300 akçe. All of the revenue went to a waqf.

In the course 17th century, the Franciscans manage to recover the ruins of the church raised by the Crusaders over the traditional birth cave of St. John and, in spite of local Muslim opposition, to rebuild and fortify it as the Monastery of St. John in the Mountains.

Israeli geographer Yehoshua Ben-Arieh described Ein Karem as "the most important village west of Jerusalem" in the 19th century.

James Silk Buckingham visited in the early 1800s, and found he was "more pleased with this village [...] than with any other place I had yet visited in Palestine."

In 1838, Ain Karim was noted as a Muslim and Latin Christian village in the Beni Hasan district.

In 1863 Victor Guérin noted a thousand inhabitants "of whom there are barely two hundred and fifty who are Catholics; the others are Muslim." The ancestors of the latter were held to descend from Maghrabins, that is to say, originating from the Maghreb (North Africa). Guérin describes them as rowdy and fanatical, until a few years before his visit having very often attacked the Catholic monks at the Monastery of St John in order to extort from them food and money, a habit that had subsided only lately.

An official Ottoman village list from about 1870 showed that Ain Karim had 178 houses and a population of 533, though the population count included only men. The population consisted of 412 Muslims in 138 houses, 66 Latin Christians in 18 houses, and 55 Greek Christians in 12 houses.

In 1883, the PEF's Survey of Western Palestine (SWP) described Ain Karim as: "A flourishing village of about 600 inhabitants, 100 being Latin Christians. It stands on a sort of natural terrace projecting from the higher hills on the east of it, with a broad flat valley below on the west. On the south below the village is a fine spring ('Ain Sitti Miriam), with a vaulted place for prayer over it. The water issues from a spout into a trough."

In 1896 the population of 'Ain Karim was estimated to be about 1,290 persons.

=== British Mandate period ===
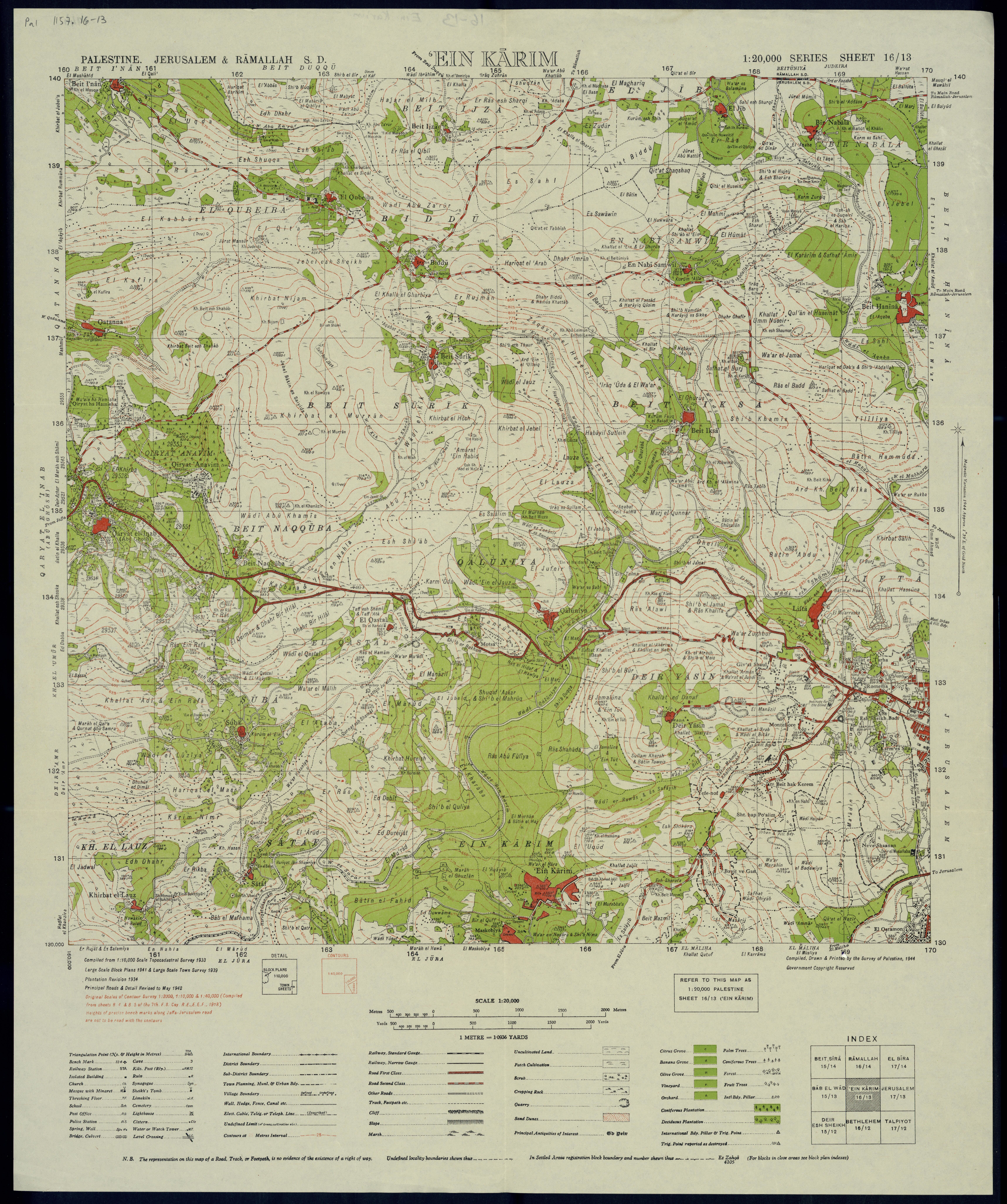
Ein Karim and the surrounding area in the 1944 Survey of Palestine

In the 1922 census of Palestine, conducted by the British Mandate authorities, the population of 'Ain Karim was 1,735; consisting of 1,282 Muslims and 453 Christians, increasing in the 1931 census to 2,637, in 555 houses.

During the 1929 riots in Palestine, Arab residents of 'Ain Karim launched raids against the nearby Jewish neighborhood of Bayit VeGan.

In the 1945 statistics, Ein Karim had a population of 3,180; 2,510 Muslims and 670 Christians, The total land area was 15,029 dunams, of this, a total of 7,960 dunums of land were irrigated or used for plantations, 1,199 were used for cereals; while a total of 1,704 dunams were classified as built-up (urban) areas.

The 1947 United Nations Partition Plan for Palestine placed 'Ayn Karim in the Jerusalem enclave intended for international control.

=== 1948 Arab–Israeli War ===
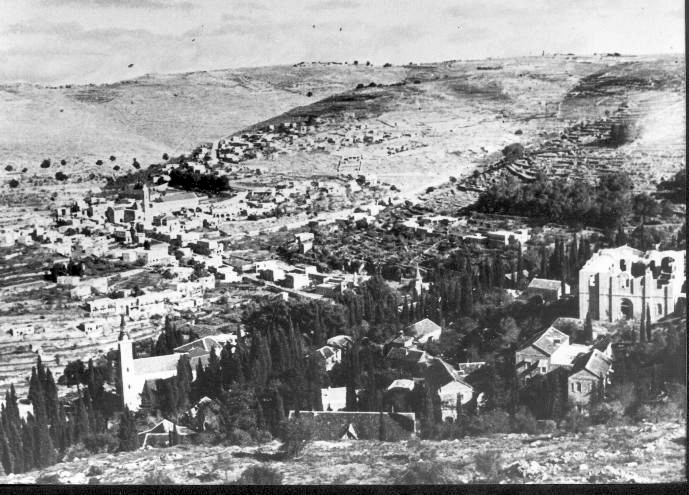
Ein Karem, 1948

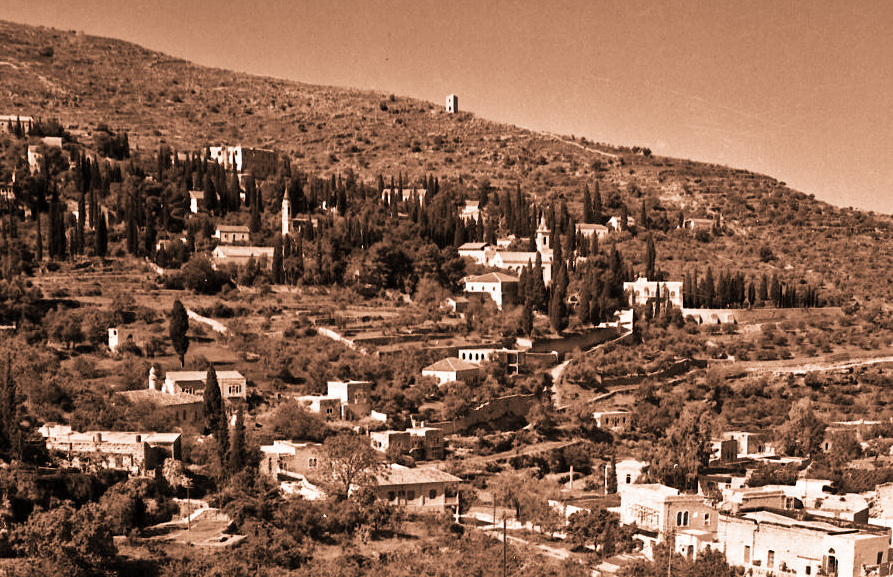
Ein Karem, 1954

When the 1947–1949 Palestine war started, 'Ain Karim became a major base of operations against nearby Jewish neighborhoods. In February 1948, the village's 300 guerilla fighters were reinforced by a well-armed Arab Liberation Army force of mainly Syrian fighters, and on March 10 a substantial Iraqi detachment arrived in the village. This was followed within days by some 160 Egyptian fighters. On March 19, the villagers joined their foreign guests in attacking a Jewish convoy on the Tel Aviv–Jerusalem road. Immediately after the April 1948 massacre at the nearby village of Deir Yassin (1.2 miles (2 km) to the north), most of the women and children in the village were evacuated.

The village was finally captured by Israeli forces during the ten-day campaign of July 1948. The remaining residents fled on July 10–11. The Arab Liberation Army forces which had camped in the village left on July 14–16 after Jewish forces captured two dominating hilltops, Khirbet Beit Mazmil and Khirbet al-Hamama, and shelled the village. During its last days, 'Ayn Karim suffered from severe food shortages.

=== State of Israel ===
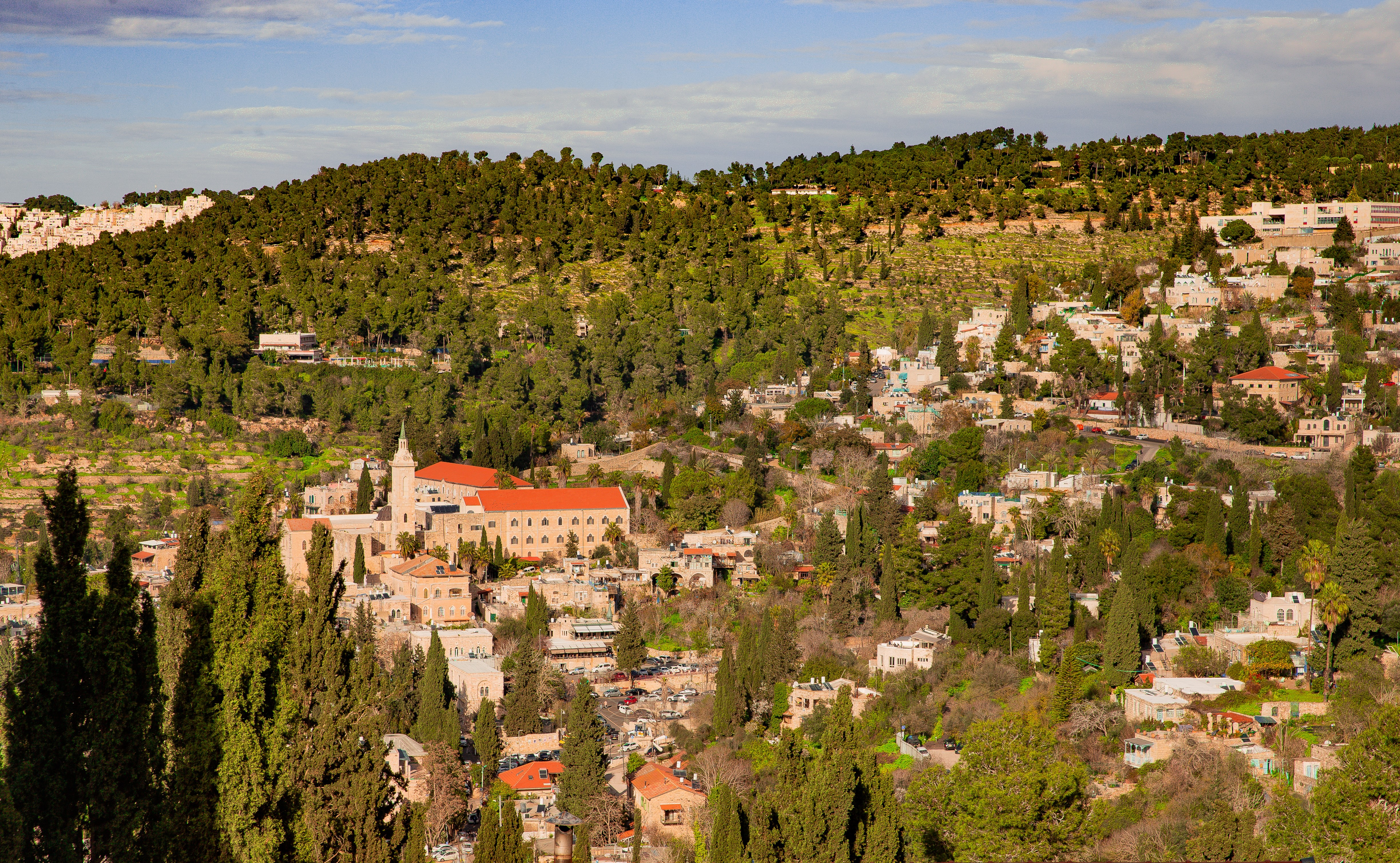
Ein Karem, 2024

After the war ended, Israel incorporated the village into the municipal boundaries of Jerusalem. Ein Karem was one of the few depopulated localities which survived the war with most of the buildings intact. The abandoned homes were resettled with immigrants, many of whom Mizrahi Jews who fled from the Arab countries who fought the Arab-Israeli War during the war and after it, i.e. Jews from Iraq and Egypt but also from Yemen. Over the years, the bucolic atmosphere attracted a population of artisans and craftsmen. Today it is a vibrant bohemian neighborhood of Jerusalem, attracting many artist, young people and tourists.

In 1961, Hadassah built its medical center on a nearby hilltop, including the Hadassah Medical Center and the Hebrew University of Jerusalem schools of medicine, dentistry, nursing, and pharmacology.

== Biblical connections ==
=== Old Testament ===
Only the Septuagint translation of the Hebrew Bible, the base for the Christian Old Testament, names a place in the hills of Judah as "Carem" (Joshua 15:30).

=== New Testament ===
According to the New Testament, Mary went "into the hill country, to a city of Judah" (Luke 1:39) when she visited her cousin Elizabeth, the wife of Zechariah.

During the Byzantine period, Theodosius (530 CE) gives the distance between Jerusalem and the town of Elizabeth as five miles (8.0 km).

The Jerusalem Calendar (Kalendarium Hyerosolimitanum) or the Georgian Festival Calendar, dated by some before 638, the year of the Muslim conquest, mentions the village by name, "Enqarim", as the place of a festival in memory of Elizabeth celebrated on the twenty-eighth of August.

The English writer Saewulf, on pilgrimage to Palestine in 1102–1103, wrote of a monastery in the area of Ein Karim dedicated to St. Sabas, where 300 monks had been "slain by Saracens", but without mentioning any tradition connected to St. John.

== Landmarks ==
=== Church of the Visitation ===
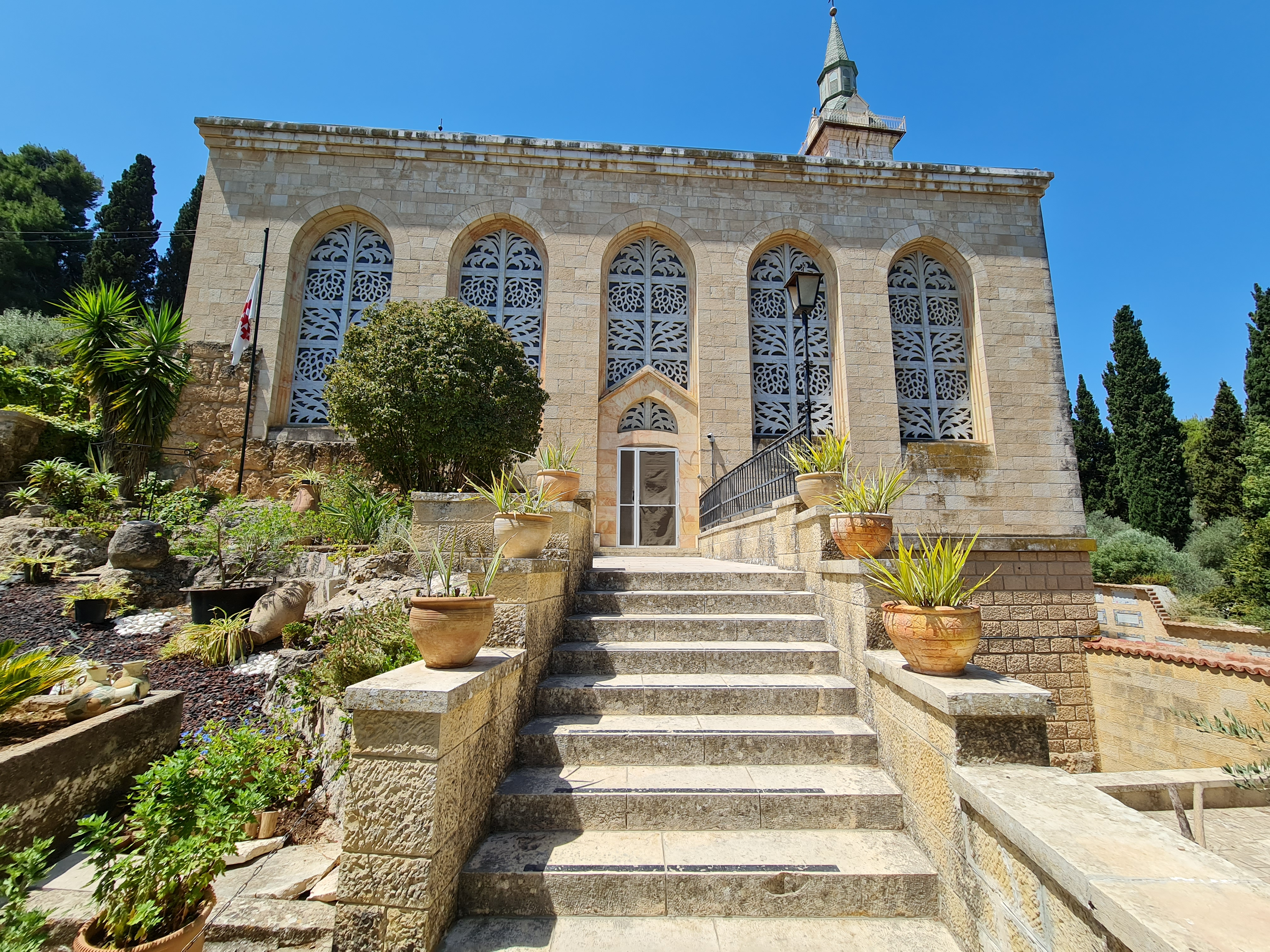
Church of the Visitation

The Church of the Visitation, or Abbey Church of St John in the Woods, is located across the village to the southwest from St. John's. The ancient sanctuary there was built against a rock declivity. It is venerated as the pietra del nascondimento, Italian for "the stone of concealment" (of Elizabeth and John), in reference to the Protevangelium of James. The site is also attributed to John the Baptist's parental summer house, where Mary visited them. The modern church was built in 1955, also on top of ancient church remnants. It was designed by Antonio Barluzzi, an Italian architect, who designed many other churches in the Holy Land during the 20th century. There is good reason to believe that the church of "Einquarim" dedicated to Elizabeth, which was mentioned in the Jerusalem Lectionary as a place of pilgrimage in the 7th and 8th centuries, corresponds to the Byzantine chapel whose remains were identified beneath the modern church.

=== Monastery of St. John in the Mountains ===
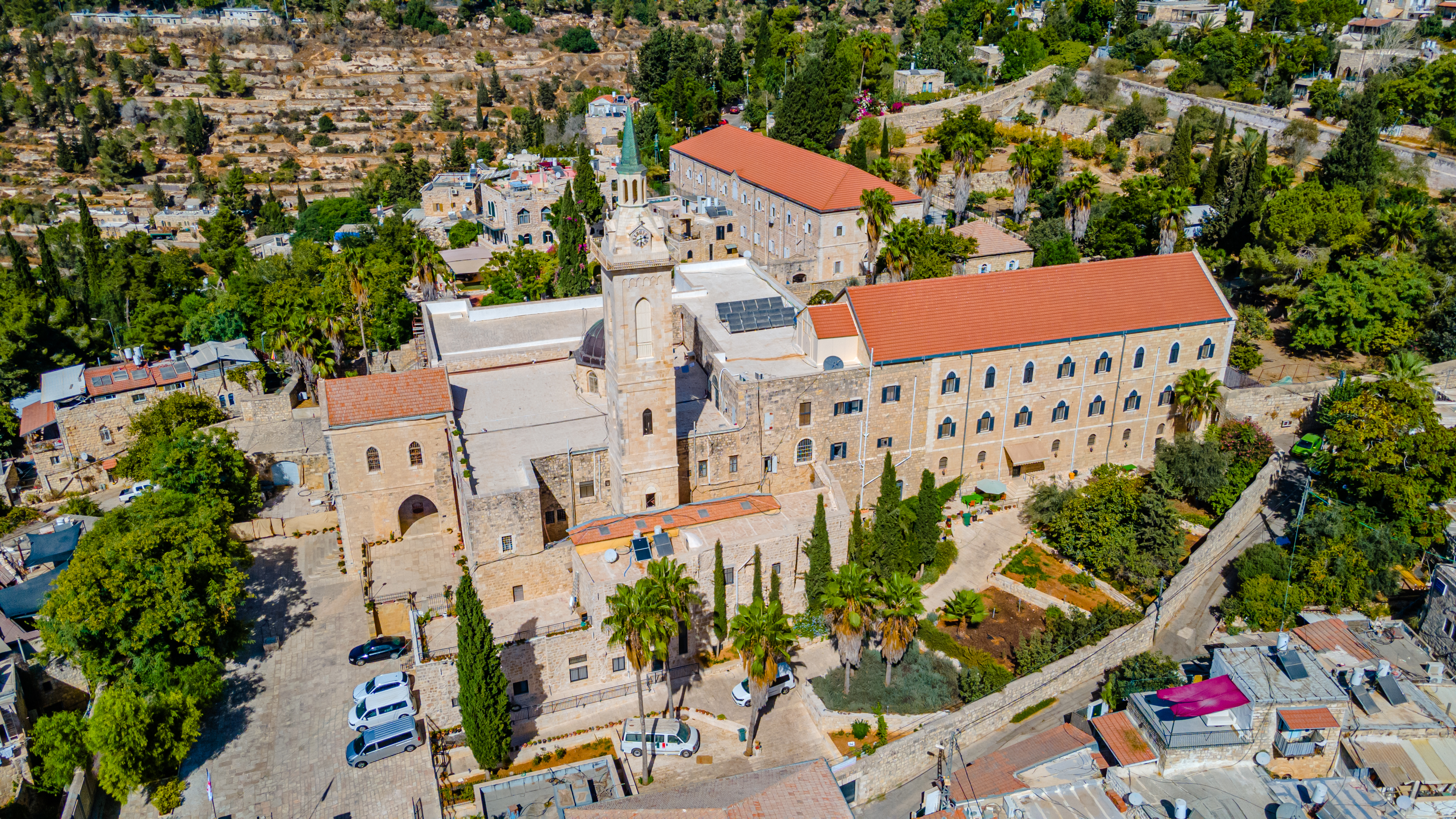
Monastery of St. John in the Mountains

The Monastery of St. John Ba-Harim (lit. 'in the Mountains'), is centered on a church containing the cave identified by tradition as the birthplace of Saint John the Baptist. The church is built over the remnants of a Crusader church and its porch stands over the remains of two Byzantine chapels, both containing mosaic floors.

In 1941–1942 the Franciscans excavated the area west of the church and monastery. The southernmost of the rock-cut chambers they found can probably be dated to the first century CE. Some remnants below the southern part of the porch suggests the presence of a mikve (Jewish ritual bath) that is dated to the Second Temple Period.

Jack Finegan identifies a 10th-century "Bayt Zakariya" near Jerusalem with Ein Karem, and a church there with the precursor of this one. He cites the Book of the Demonstration, attributed to Eutychius of Alexandria (940), which mentions that "The church of Bayt Zakariya in the district of Aelia bears witness to the visit of Mary to her kinswoman Elizabeth."

The site of the Crusader church built above the traditional birth cave of St John, destroyed after the departure of the Crusaders, was purchased by Franciscan custos, Father Thomas of Novara in 1621. After a decades-long struggle with the Muslim inhabitants, the Franciscans finally managed to rebuild and fortify their church and monastery by the 1690s.

=== Convent of the Sisters of Zion ===
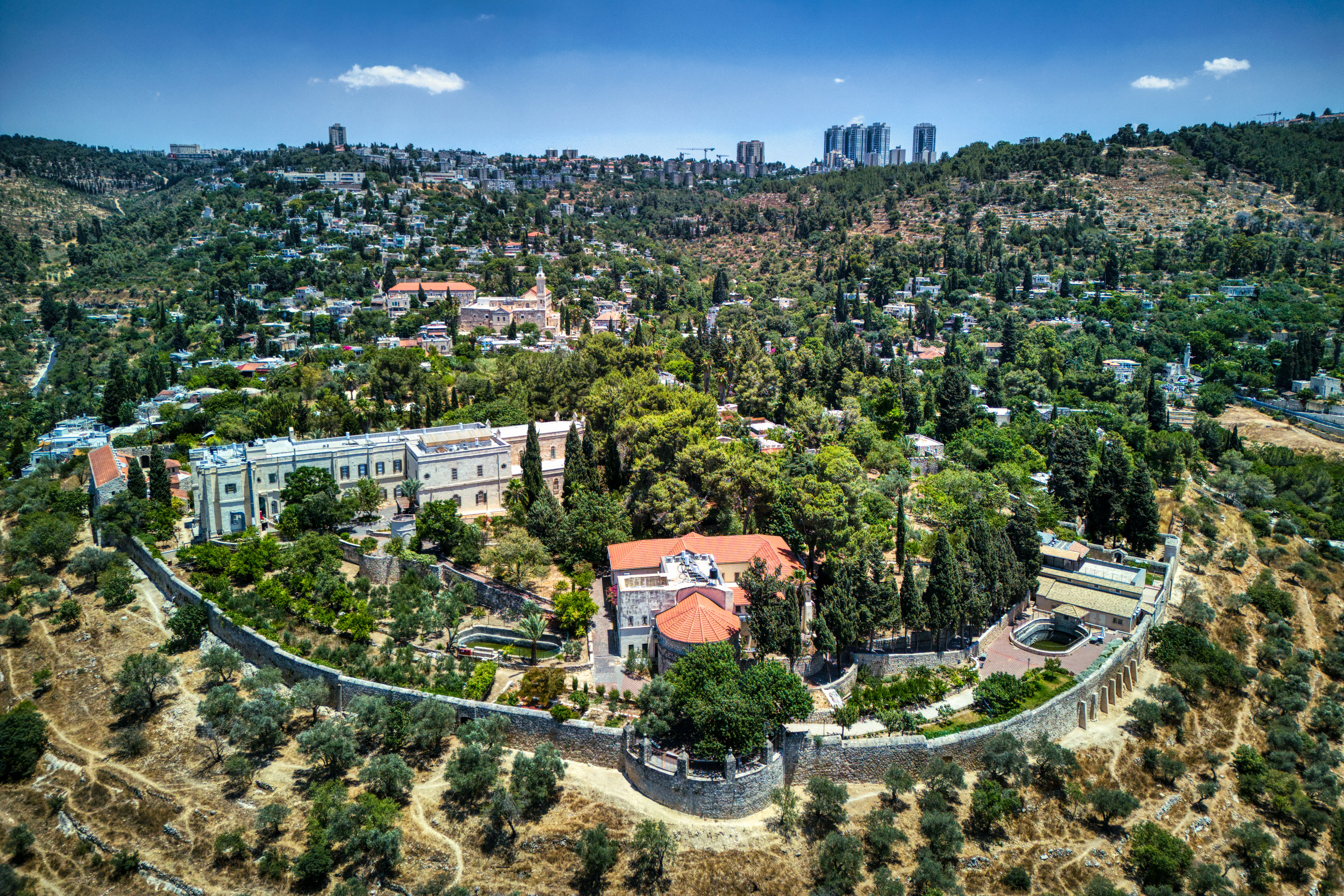
Convent of the Sisters of Zion

The monastery of Les Sœurs de Notre-Dame de Sion (Sisters of Our Lady of Zion), built in 1860, was founded by two brothers from France, Marie-Théodore Ratisbonne and Marie-Alphonse Ratisbonne, who were born Jewish and converted to Christianity.

They established an orphanage here. Alphonse himself lived in the monastery and is buried in its garden.

=== Gorny or "Moscobia" Convent ===
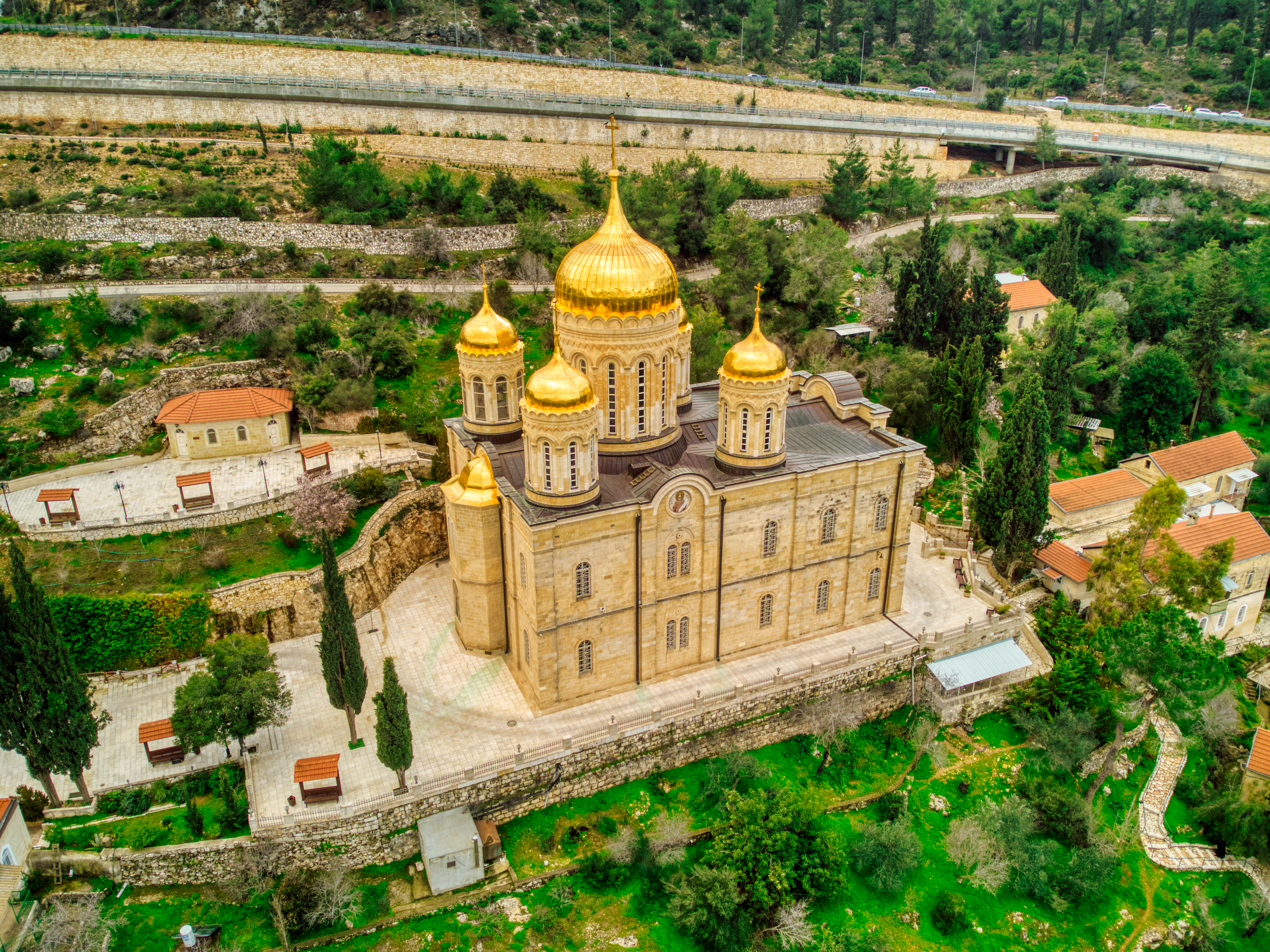
Gorny Convent

The convent was established by the Jerusalem mission of the Russian Orthodox Church in 1871. The name "Gorny Convent" refers to the visit of the Virgin Mary to her cousin St. Elizabeth "into the hill country, to a town in Judah", gorny meaning mountainous in Russian. It was nicknamed "Muskobiya" (Arabic for Muscovite) by the local Arab villagers, which mutated in Hebrew to "Moskovia".

Apart from the structures serving the nunnery and a pilgrims hostel, it now contains three churches, enclosed within a compound wall. The Church of Our Lady of Kazan (Kazanskaya) is dedicated to the holy icon of Our Lady of Kazan and is the oldest among the three churches, being consecrated in 1873. The Cathedral of All Russian Saints, with its gilded domes, was started before the Russian Revolution and could only be completed in 2007. The cave church of St. John the Baptist was consecrated in 1987.

=== Mary's Spring ===
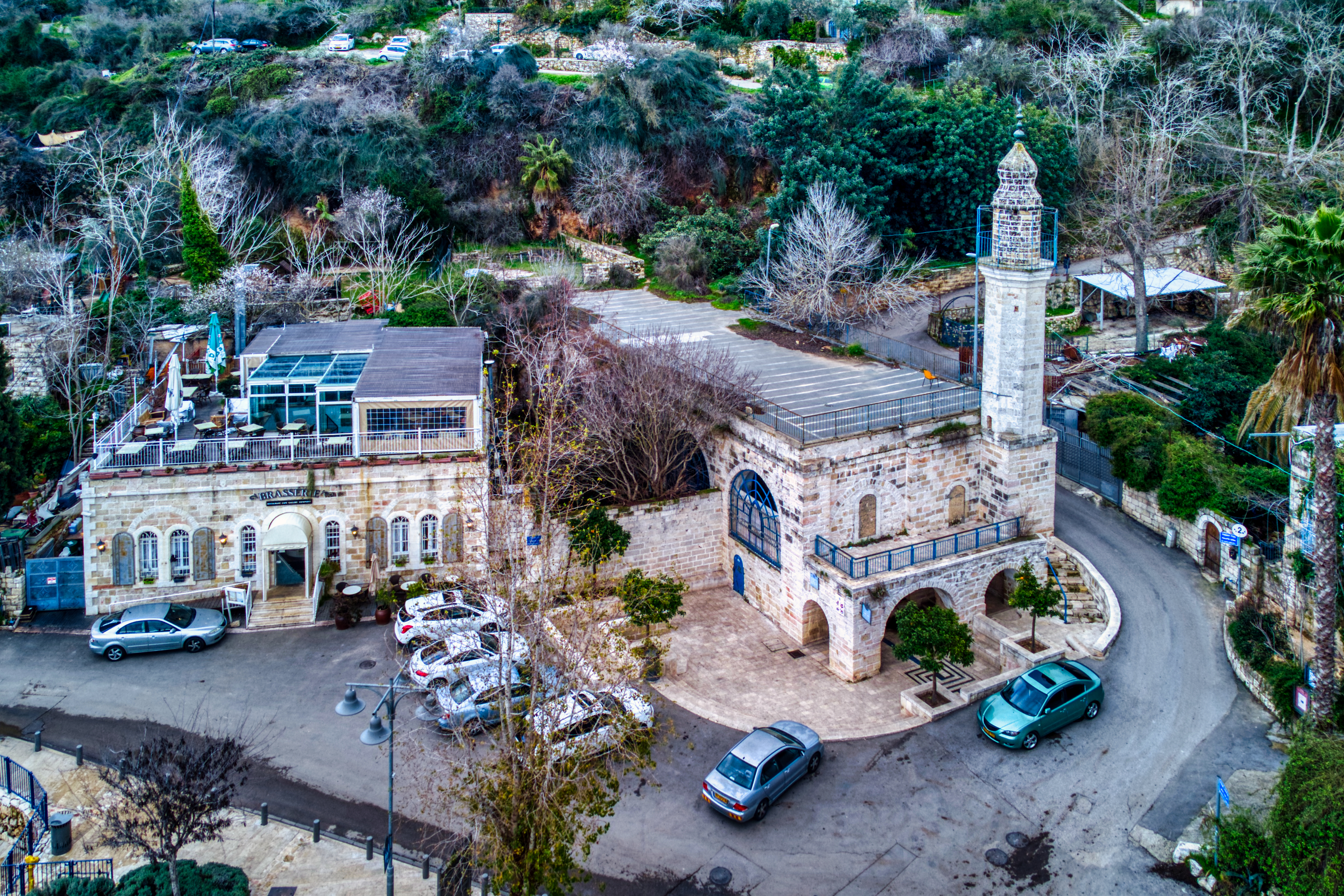
Mary's Spring

According to a Christian tradition which started in the 14th century, the Virgin Mary drank water from this village spring, and here is also the place where Mary and Elizabeth met. Therefore, since the 14th century the spring is known as the Fountain of the Virgin. The spring waters are considered holy by some Catholic and Orthodox Christian pilgrims who visit the site and fill their bottles. What looks like a spring is actually the end of an ancient aqueduct.

The former Arab inhabitants built a mosque and school on the site, of which a maqam and minaret still remain. An inscribed panel to the courtyard of the mosque dates it to 1828–1829 CE (AH 1244). The spring was repaired and renovated by Baron Edmond de Rothschild.

=== Monastery of St. John in the Wilderness ===
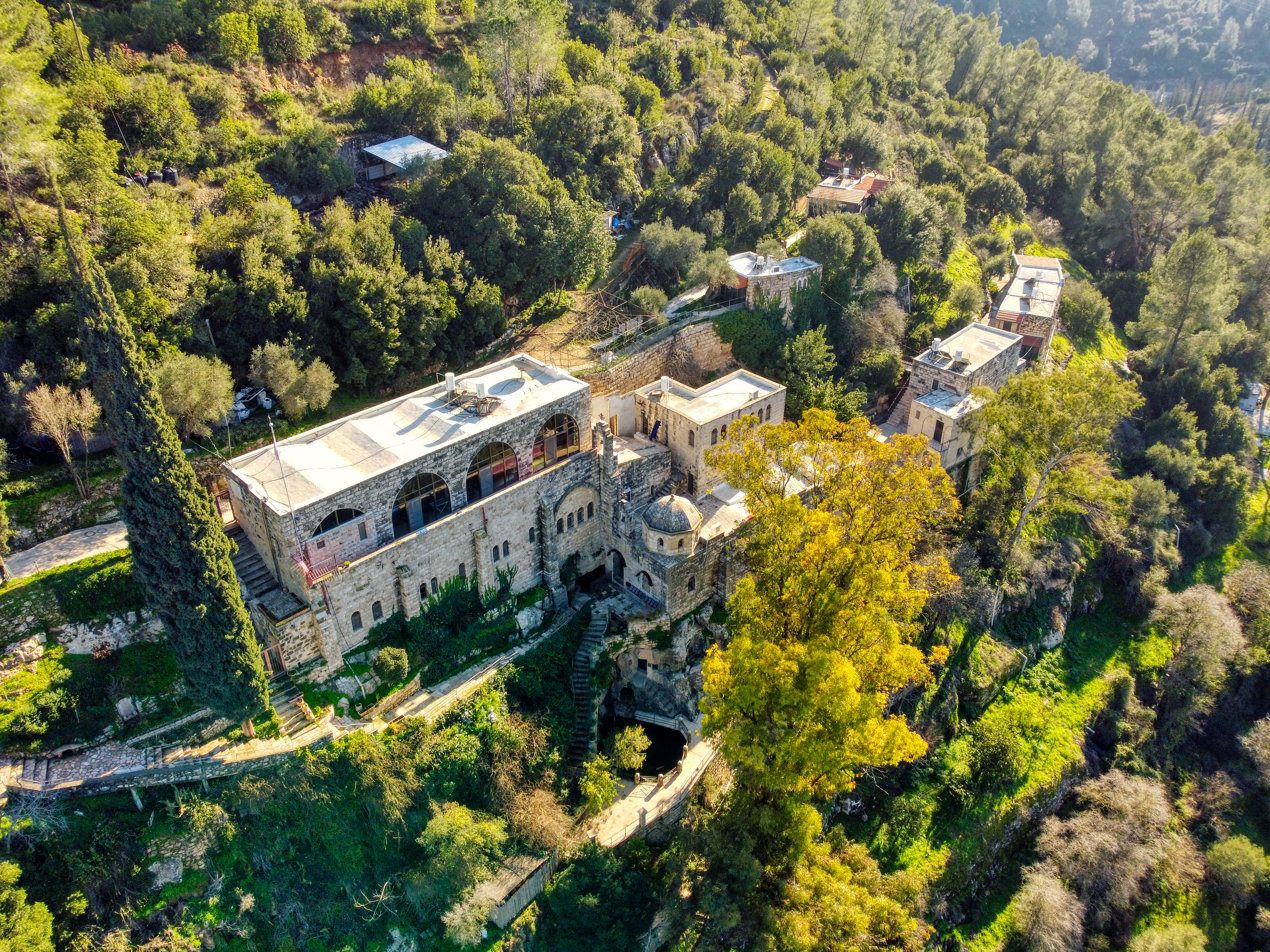
Monastery of Saint John in the Wilderness

The Monastery of St. John in the Wilderness, containing a cave associated with the saint, is located close to Ein Karem and Even Sapir.

=== St. Vincent ===
St. Vincent-Ein Kerem is a home for physically or mentally handicapped children. Founded in 1954, St. Vincent-Ein Kerem is a non-profit enterprise under leadership of the Daughters of Charity of St. Vincent de Paul.

=== Other churches and religious institutions ===
==== Catholic ====
- The Convent of the Franciscan Sisters
- The Convent of the Rosary Sisters, built in 1910
- Casa Nova, a guesthouse for pilgrims reopened in 2014

==== Greek Orthodox ====
- The Greek Orthodox Church of St John, built in 1894 on the remnants of an ancient church

== Notable residents ==
- Shlomo Aronson (1936–2018), landscape architect
- Erel Margalit (born 1961), high-tech and social entrepreneur
- Naomi Henrik (1920–2018), sculptor

== See also ==
- 1948 Palestine War
- Beit HaKerem, a biblical fortress in Judah identified with either the later Herodium site, Ramat Rachel, or Ein Kerem
- Carem, a town mentioned only in the Septuagint
- Ein Kerem Agricultural School
- Depopulated Palestinian locations in Israel
- List of villages depopulated during the Arab–Israeli conflict

== Bibliography ==
- Abel, F.M. (1938). Geographie de la Palestine. Vol. 2 Geographie Politique. Les villes. Librairie Lecoffre.
- Avner, Rina (2006-01-08). "Jerusalem, 'En Kerem" (118). Hadashot Arkheologiyot – Excavations and Surveys in Israel.
- Barron, J.B., ed. (1923). Palestine: Report and General Abstracts of the Census of 1922. Government of Palestine.
- Buckingham, J.S. (1821). Travels in Palestine Through the Countries of Bashan and Gilead, East of the River Jordan, Including a Visit to the Cities of Geraza and Gamala in the Decapolis. London: Longman.
- Conder, C.R.; Kitchener, H.H. (1883). The Survey of Western Palestine: Memoirs of the Topography, Orography, Hydrography, and Archaeology. Vol. 3. London: Committee of the Palestine Exploration Fund.
- Dauphin, C. (1998). La Palestine byzantine, Peuplement et Populations. BAR International Series 726 (in French). Vol. III : Catalogue. Oxford: Archeopress. ISBN 0-860549-05-4.
- Government of Palestine, Department of Statistics (1945). Village Statistics, April, 1945.
- Guérin, V. (1868). Description Géographique Historique et Archéologique de la Palestine (in French). Vol. 1: Judee, pt. 1. Paris: L'Imprimerie Nationale.
- Guérin, V. (1869). Description Géographique Historique et Archéologique de la Palestine (in French). Vol. 1: Judee, pt. 2. Paris: L'Imprimerie Nationale.
- Hadawi, S. (1970). Village Statistics of 1945: A Classification of Land and Area ownership in Palestine. Palestine Liberation Organization Research Centre.
- Hartmann, M. (1883). "Die Ortschaftenliste des Liwa Jerusalem in dem türkischen Staatskalender für Syrien auf das Jahr 1288 der Flucht (1871)". Zeitschrift des Deutschen Palästina-Vereins. 6: 102–149.
- Hütteroth, W.-D.; Abdulfattah, K. (1977). Historical Geography of Palestine, Transjordan and Southern Syria in the Late 16th Century. Erlanger Geographische Arbeiten, Sonderband 5. Erlangen, Germany: Vorstand der Fränkischen Geographischen Gesellschaft. ISBN 3-920405-41-2.
- Kark, R.; Oren-Nordheim, Michal (2001). Jerusalem and Its Environs: Quarters, Neighborhoods, Villages, 1800–1948. Wayne State University Press. ISBN 978-0-814-32909-2.
- Khalidi, W. (1992). All That Remains: The Palestinian Villages Occupied and Depopulated by Israel in 1948. Washington D.C.: Institute for Palestine Studies. ISBN 0-88728-224-5.
- Mills, E., ed. (1932). Census of Palestine 1931. Population of Villages, Towns and Administrative Areas. Jerusalem: Government of Palestine.
- Morris, B. (2004). The Birth of the Palestinian Refugee Problem Revisited. Cambridge University Press. ISBN 978-0-521-00967-6.
- Landes-Nagar, Annette (2017-05-14). "Jerusalem, 'En Kerem" (129). Hadashot Arkheologiyot – Excavations and Surveys in Israel.
- Palmer, E.H. (1881). The Survey of Western Palestine: Arabic and English Name Lists Collected During the Survey by Lieutenants Conder and Kitchener, R. E. Transliterated and Explained by E.H. Palmer. Committee of the Palestine Exploration Fund.
- Petersen, Andrew (2001). A Gazetteer of Buildings in Muslim Palestine (British Academy Monographs in Archaeology). Vol. 1. Oxford University Press. ISBN 978-0-19-727011-0.
- Pringle, D. (1993). The Churches of the Crusader Kingdom of Jerusalem: A–K (excluding Acre and Jerusalem). Vol. I. Cambridge University Press. ISBN 0-521-39036-2.
- Radashkovsky, Igal (2018-02-27). "Jerusalem, 'En Kerem" (130). Hadashot Arkheologiyot – Excavations and Surveys in Israel.
- Re'em, Amit (2016-06-05). "Jerusalem, 'En Kerem" (128). Hadashot Arkheologiyot – Excavations and Surveys in Israel.
- Robinson, E.; Smith, E. (1841). Biblical Researches in Palestine, Mount Sinai and Arabia Petraea: A Journal of Travels in the year 1838. Vol. 2. Boston: Crocker & Brewster.
- Robinson, E.; Smith, E. (1841). Biblical Researches in Palestine, Mount Sinai and Arabia Petraea: A Journal of Travels in the year 1838. Vol. 3. Boston: Crocker & Brewster.
- Schick, C. (1896). "Zur Einwohnerzahl des Bezirks Jerusalem". Zeitschrift des Deutschen Palästina-Vereins. 19: 120–127.
- Schick C. (1899). "Ancient Rock-cut Wine-presses at 'Ain Karim". Quarterly Statement – Palestine Exploration Fund. 31: 41–42.
- Schick C. (1905). "The birthplace of St. John the Baptist". Quarterly Statement – Palestine Exploration Fund. 37: 61–69.
- Sharon, M. (2004). Corpus Inscriptionum Arabicarum Palaestinae, D–F. Vol. 3. BRILL. ISBN 90-04-13197-3.
- Socin, A. (1879). "Alphabetisches Verzeichniss von Ortschaften des Paschalik Jerusalem". Zeitschrift des Deutschen Palästina-Vereins. 2: 135–163.
- Theodosius (1893). Theodosius (A.D. 530). Palestine Pilgrims' Text Society.
- Tobler, T. (1854). Dr. Titus Toblers zwei Bucher Topographie von Jerusalem und seinen Umgebungen (in German). Vol. 2. Berlin: G. Reimer. pp. 344 ff)
- Tsafrir, Y.; Leah Di Segni; Judith Green (1994). (TIR): Tabula Imperii Romani: Judaea, Palaestina. Jerusalem: Israel Academy of Sciences and Humanities. ISBN 965-208-107-8.
