= Martin West (colonial administrator) =

Sir Martin West (1804–1849) was born in England, the son of a civil servant in the Treasury.

Martin West studied at Balliol College, Oxford, before joining the British East India Company. He served in Bombay but had to retire on grounds of ill-health and became Resident Magistrate in Grahamstown, Cape Colony.

From this post, he was appointed the first Lieutenant-Governor and the first civilian administrator of the Colony of Natal in 1845, still a dependency of the Cape. He reached Natal on 8 December 1845.

Joyce's short biographical entry describes him as "a moderate administrator, …(who) suffered from poor health and, ill-supported by the British government, … achieved negligible progress during his term of office". He was retired from the Natal governorship in 1849 and died that year.

Durban's West Street and the suburb of Westville are named after him. Westville Boys' High School also has a school house called West that is named after him.
