= Beit HaKerem (Bible) =

Biblical place associated with the Tribe of Judah

Beit HaKerem, Beth-haccerem (Hebrew: בית הכרם, lit. "house of the vineyard"; Beth HakKerem in Biblical Hebrew) is a biblical place associated with the Tribe of Judah (Nehemiah 3:14).

== Bible and Talmud ==
According to Jeremiah 6:1, the trumpet sounded against the invading army of Babylon at this place.

Beit Hakerem was a district center during the Persian period and is mentioned in the Book of Nehemiah as one of the towns resettled by the Jewish exiles returning from the Babylonian captivity and who helped to construct the walls of Jerusalem during the reign of Artaxerxes I (Xerxes; Nehemiah 3:14). Nehemiah further records that those returnees were the very descendants of the people who had formerly resided in the town before their banishment from the country, who had all returned to live in their former places of residence (Nehemiah 7:6).

The Mishnah, compiled in the 2nd century CE, mentions "the valley of Beth-Kerem" being a place where there was reddish-brown earth. Likewise, the stones of the altar built in Jerusalem and the stones of the ramp that led up to the altar were taken from the valley of Beth Kerem, where they were quarried from below virgin soil and brought from thence as whole stones upon which no implement of iron had been lifted up.

== Possible location ==
Neubauer, citing the Church Father Jerome, writes that from Bethlehem one could see Bethacharma, thought to be the Beit HaKerem of Jeremiah.

=== Ein Kerem ===
Some identify Beit HaKerem with Ein Kerem.

=== Ramat Rachel ===
Others place Beit HaKerem south of Jerusalem, at Ramat Rachel, where cairns on the ridge may have served as beacons of old.

Archaeological finds at Ramat Rachel have yielded dozens of seal impressions on jar handles from the 4th-3rd centuries BCE bearing the inscription yehud, the official name of the province of Judah in this period.

=== Near Tekoa ===
Beit HaKerem being described in Jeremiah 6:1 as a beacon station and right after a verse mentioning Tekoa, makes others identify it with the mount where Herod later built Herodium, southeast of Bethlehem on the road leading from Jerusalem to Tekoa.
