= Ruth Kark =

Israeli historical geographer (born 1941)

- רות קרק
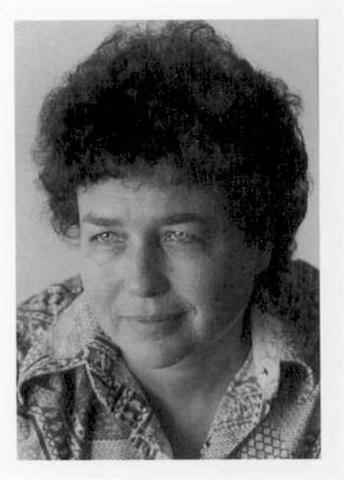
- Born: Ruth Kleiner; 1941 (age 84–85); Herzliya, Israel
- Education: Hebrew University of Jerusalem
- Occupation: Historical geographer
- Spouse: Jeremy David Kark

Ruth Kark (Hebrew: רות קרק; born 1941) is an Israeli historical geographer and professor of geography at the Hebrew University of Jerusalem. Kark is a well-known researcher and expert in the field of the historical geography of the Middle East, the Land of Israel, and the State of Israel. She was awarded the 2025 Israel Prize in the field of geographical research and knowledge of the Land of Israel ("Land of Israel studies").

== Biography ==
=== Early life and education ===
Ruth Kark (née Kleiner) was born in Herzliya in 1941 to Shoshana Moczan and Avraham Kleiner.

Kark completed her B.A. at the Hebrew University of Jerusalem in 1964, was awarded an M.A. in 1972 and earned her doctorate in 1977, becoming the first female Israeli geographer with a PhD and a pioneer of historical geography research in Land of Israel studies.

- Kark, Ruth (1976). The Development of the Cities Jerusalem and Jaffa - 1840 up to the First World War (A Study in Historical Geography) (PhD thesis). Hebrew University of Jerusalem.

=== Personal life ===
Ruth Kark was married to Jeremy David Kark, with whom she has three children.

== Academic career ==
Kark has written and edited 30 books and published over 250 peer-reviewed articles on the history and historical geography of what is known as either the Palestine region or the Land of Israel. Kark is noted for her work on historical settlement in the Land of Israel in the 19th century and the early 20th century, development of old and new cities in the region (including Jerusalem, Jaffa, and others), missions to the Holy Land, land purchase in the region, and more. Additionally, she has published works about women and minorities, Sepharadic entrepreneurs, and land ownership in both traditional and modern cultures in the Middle East. Kark has often been brought into court hearings in Israel as an expert on land dispute (such as among different churches), and as an academic with a reputation in the field of pre-State land ownership in Israel.

== Awards and recognition ==
Professor Kark has received numerous scholarships and awards. These include the Jerusalem Bank award, a Fulbright scholarship (USA-Israel), and various others. In 2009, Kark and co-author Joseph Glass won an award for their research on the development of banking in Ottoman Palestine.

In 2013, Kark was awarded the Yakir Yerushalayim prize (the Jerusalem Award) for her contributions to the city of Jerusalem. In 2014, she received the Herzl Award for her research on the settlement in the land of Israel, and in 2016 she was awarded a recognition of excellence award from the Israeli Geographical Society.

In 2025, Kark was awarded the prestigious Israel Prize in the field of geographical research and knowledge of the Land of Israel. The prize committee praised Kark's "comprehensive, original, and unique contribution". Kark is the first female geographer to be awarded the prize in the area of Geography. Kark has also been commended on her dedication to uncovering and highlighting the role of women in settlement and society in the region. This includes her work on Jewish, Christian, Arab Muslim and Bedouin women and their contributions.

== Published works ==
=== Books ===
- Kark, R., Frontier Jewish Settlement in the Negev, 1880–1948. Tel Aviv: Ha-Kibbutz Ha-Muchad Publishers, 1974 (Hebrew).
- Kark, R., Neighborhoods in Jerusalem—Building in New Jerusalem and Neighborhoods By-Laws. Jerusalem: Yad Izhak Ben-Zvi Publications, 1978 (Hebrew).
- Kark, R., Jaffa—A City in Evolution, 1799–1917. Jerusalem: Yad Izhak Ben-Zvi, 1984 (Hebrew).
- Kark, R., Jerusalem Neighborhoods, Planning and By-Laws (1855–1930). Jerusalem: Magnes Press, 1991.
- Glass J. B. and Kark, R., Sephardi Entrepreneurs in Eretz Israel—The Amzalak Family, 1816–1918. Jerusalem: Magnes Press, 1991.
- Kark, R., American Consuls in the Holy Land 1832–1914. Detroit: Wayne State University Press; Jerusalem: Magnes Press, 1994.
- Kark, R. and Oren-Nordheim M., Jerusalem and Its Environs—Quarters, Neighborhoods and Villages 1800–1948. Jerusalem: Academon Publishing House, 1995 (Hebrew).
- Dudman, H. and Kark, R., The American Colony, Scenes from a Jerusalem Saga. Jerusalem: Carta, 1998.
- Kark-Kleiner, R., The Pioneering Observation Posts in the Negev. Jerusalem: Ariel Publishing, Jerusalem, 2002 (Hebrew).
- Kark, R. and Glass, J. B., Seven Generations in Jerusalem: The Valero Family, 1800-1948. Gefen Publishing House, Jerusalem and New York, 2005 (Hebrew).
- Perry, N. and Kark, R., Ethnographic Museums in Israel, Jerusalem: Ariel Publishing, Jerusalem, 2014 (Hebrew) and English, Israel Academic Press (2017).
- Galilee, E. and Kark, R., The Valley of Yizrael/Marj Ibn Amarat the end of the Ottoman Period, Hebrew & English, Israel Academic Press, New York, 2017.
- Galilee, E. and Kark, R., Transformation of the Jezreel Valley: Marj Ibn 'Amer in the late Ottoman Period, Israel Academic Press, 2018.
- Slae, B. and Kark, R., Jerusalem’s Jewish Quarter: Heritage and Post War Restoration, Israel Academic Press and Amazon, New York, 2018 (English) + Bar Ilan University Press, Ramat Gan, 2023 (Hebrew).
- Amit Cohen, I. and Kark, R., Yehoshua Hankin: Two Loves. Tel Aviv: Milo, 1996, (Hebrew) + Israel Academic Press, 2023 (English).
- Kark, R., The Bedouins and The Negev: Nomadism and Land Ownership Perspectives, 1800-1967, Israel Academic Press, New York, 2025 (English).

=== Edited books ===
- Ben-Arieh, Y. and Kark, R., eds. Israel Studies in Historical Geography. A Book Series. Jerusalem: Magnes Press (five volumes, 1989–1997; four of the volumes in press).
- Kark, R., ed. The Land that Became Israel. Studies in Historical Geography. Jerusalem: Magnes Press, 1989. 362 pp.
- Kark, R., ed. Redemption of the Land of Eretz-Israel: Ideology and Practice. Jerusalem: Yad Izhak Ben-Zvi Publications, 1990. 320 pp. (in Hebrew).
- Kark, R., ed. Land and Settlement in Eretz Israel 1830–1990. Selected Papers by Prof. Ruth Kark. Jerusalem: The Land-Use Research Institute, 1995. 200 pp. (in Hebrew and English).
- Shilo, M., Kark, R. and Hasan-Rokem, G., eds., Jewish Women in the Yishuv and Zionism: A Gender Perspective, Jerusalem: Yad Izhak Ben-Zvi Press, 2001, 463 pp. (Hebrew).
- Kark, R., Shilo, M. and Hasan-Rokem, G., Jewish Women in Pre-State Israel: Life History, Politics and Culture, Waltham, MA.: Brandeis University Press and Hanover, NH and London: University Press of New England (updated English version, 2008).

== See also ==
- Women of Israel
