= Nathan J. Saltz =

American-born Israeli surgeon and educator

- נתן זלץ
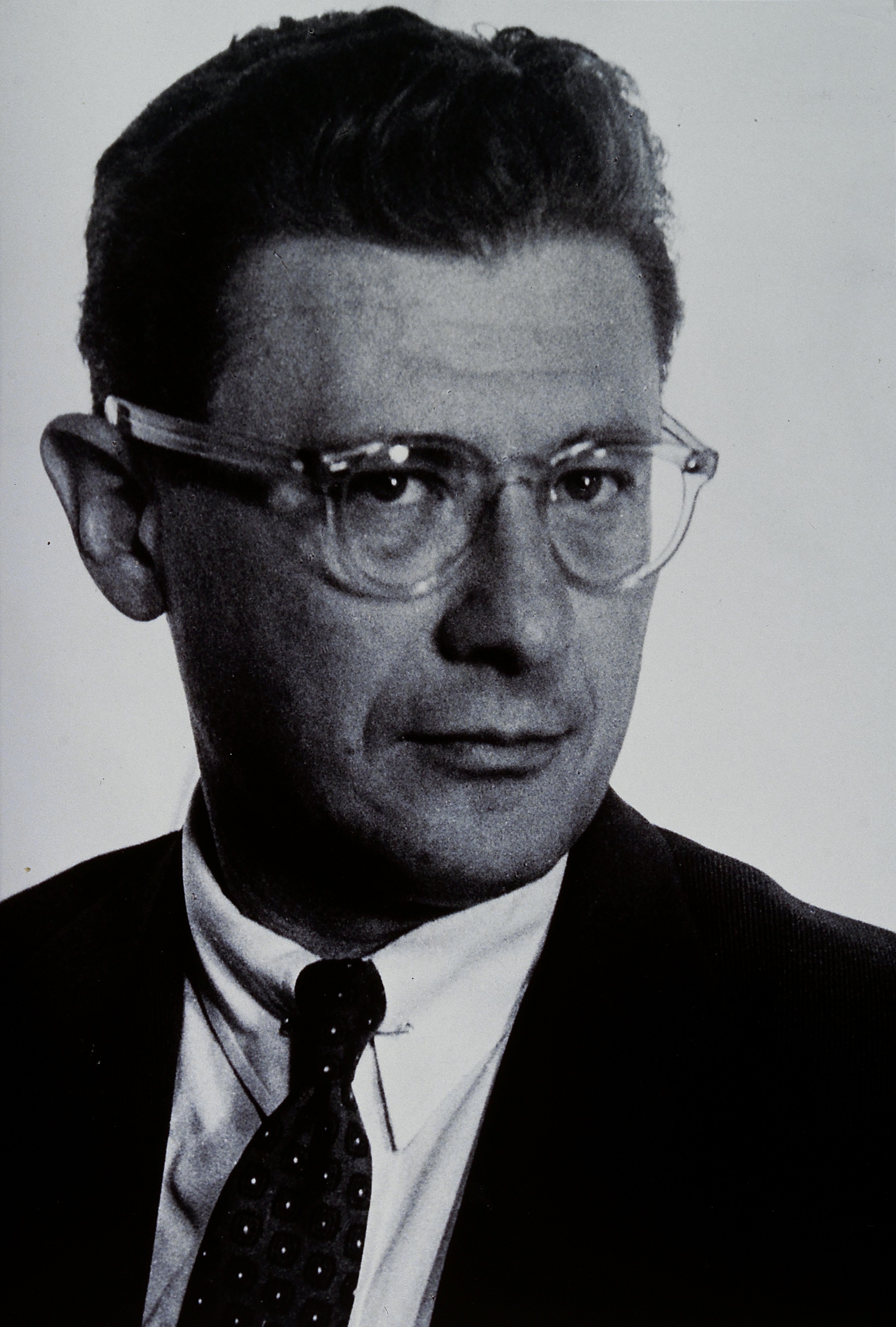
- Born: 1 January 1912; New York City, United States
- Died: 27 July 2003 (aged 91); Jerusalem, Israel
- Education: Emory University School of Medicine
- Occupations: Medical doctor, surgeon, educator
- Known for: Founding modern surgical medicine in Israel
- Awards: Purple Heart; Bronze Stars (3); Fellow of the American College of Surgeons; Israel Prize (1978)

Professor Nathan J. Saltz (Hebrew: נתן זלץ; 1912 – July 27, 2003) was an American-born Israeli medical doctor who is considered the father and founder of modern surgical medicine in Israel.

== Biography ==
He was born in New York City in 1912 and moved to Florida in his childhood. He graduated from the Emory University School of Medicine. Following his internship he enlisted in the United States Army Medical Corps in 1941, and served as a battalion surgeon for four years during World War II, participating in the North African campaign and the Allied invasion of Sicily. During this time he lost his hearing and was awarded a Purple Heart. He also was awarded three Bronze Stars. After the war he trained at New York University and was Chief Resident in Surgery at the New York University Bellevue Medical Center.

In 1950, he moved to Israel with his wife (Dr. Armen Saltz), settling in Jerusalem, where he practiced medicine at the Hadassah Medical Center.

== Career ==
Saltz became a leading surgeon in Israel. In 1961, he was appointed the director of Surgery Department A, and in 1962 he was appointed head of all of the surgery departments at Hadassah Hospital. His appointment as head of surgery began a new era for Israeli surgery. Saltz had two goals: One was to bring modern, academic surgery to Hadassah, and the other was to establish a system of surgical education, similar to that in the United States. According to the American system, the surgeon was responsible not only for the care of the patient, but also for sharing his knowledge and experience with his students. This differed from the European discipline then practiced in Israel, which was based on the personal experience of the seemingly omnipotent head of the surgery department, rather than on clinical research, current medical literature, and the resident's analysis. Thus, Saltz developed a new curriculum for the systematic training of physicians that included clinical consultations, instructions during surgery, formal post-operative assessment, and extensive weekly concilia, and caused the Medical School and its surgical training to become pre-eminent in Israel and renowned abroad.

Saltz introduced and spread the principles of trauma care throughout the Israeli civil and military medical systems. Drawing upon his extensive battlefield experience and his thorough understanding of the patho-physiological processes occurring in conditions of trauma, he trained an entire generation of Army physicians in the techniques of field surgery and medical practice under combat conditions.

During the Six-Day War, when Hadassah Hospital functioned as a field hospital, Saltz's academic, research, and combat experience was key in the treatment of the hundreds of wounded who packed the hospital's rooms and corridors. He took command, determined triage, chose the necessary surgical interventions, and prioritized patients. Through six endless days and nights, he never forgot a kind word for the wounded and their families, but asked nothing for himself – neither a cup of tea nor a moment's rest. The scene was similar during the 1973 Yom Kippur War, except that by then, it was his students who were manning the field hospital at Rephidim in the Sinai Desert. His teaching is the standard today for the Israeli Defense Forces Medical Corps and his methods have been adopted by military medical corps throughout the world.

Saltz left the Hadassah Medical Center at the age of 65. A year later, he set up a new surgical department at the Bikur Cholim Hospital in downtown Jerusalem. There he served as head of the department until he retired at the age of 80. He died in Jerusalem on July 27, 2003.

He was a senior member of the Henry IV Surgical Association, was a Fellow of the American College of Surgeons, and Editor in Chief of the Israel Journal of Medicine.

== Awards ==
- In 1978, Saltz was awarded the Israel Prize, for medicine. In their decision, the members of the Israel Prize committee noted that "Professor Saltz is outstanding in his honesty and humility, responsibility, humane approach, and willingness to help patients in all extremities. He has cut a shining path for other practitioners of medicine".
- In 1984, he received the Yakir Yerushalayim (Worthy Citizen of Jerusalem) award from the city of Jerusalem.
- He received an honorary Ph.D. from the Hebrew University of Jerusalem.
- He has received Yakir Hadassah awards.

== See also ==
- List of Israel Prize recipients
