= Jacob Sheskin =

Israeli physician (1914–1999)

- יעקב שסקין
- Born: 1914; Vilna, Russian Empire
- Died: April 17, 1999 (aged 85); Jerusalem, Israel
- Scientific career
- Fields: Medicine
- Workplaces: Hadassah Medical Center

Jacob Sheskin, sometimes written as Sheskin Jacob (Hebrew: יעקב שסקין; 1914 – April 17, 1999) was a Russian-born Israeli physician best known for his 1964 serendipitous discovery that thalidomide can be used as a treatment for leprosy at Hadassah University in Jerusalem.

== Awards ==
- In 1975, the World Academy of Art and Science gave Sheskin a gold medal for his work.
- in 1997, he was named Yakir Yerushalayim (Hebrew: יַקִּיר יְרוּשָׁלַיִם), or "Worthy Citizen of Jerusalem".

== Bibliography ==
- Sheskin, J. (1975). Thalidomide in lepra reaction. International Journal of Dermatology, 14(8), 575-576.
- Sheskin, J. (1975). The case for invisible leprosy. International Journal of Dermatology, 14(5), 345-346.
- Sheskin, J., Sabatto, S., Yosipovitz, Z., & Ilukevich, A. (1983). Lack of wrinkle formation in the fingertips of patients with Hansen's disease. Confirmation of previous observations. Hansenologia Internationalis, 8(1), 54-60.
- Sheskin, J. (1980). The treatment of lepra reaction in lepromatous leprosy. International Journal of Dermatology, 19(6), 318-322.
- Gorodetsky, R., Sheskin, J., & Weinreb, A. (1986). Iron, copper, and zinc concentrations in normal skin and in various nonmalignant and malignant lesions. International Journal of Dermatology, 25(7), 440-445.
- Wahba, A., Dorfman, M., & Sheskin, J. (1980). Psoriasis and other common dermatoses in leprosy. International Journal of Dermatology, 19(2), 93-95.
- Sheskin, J. (1978). Study with nine thalidomide derivatives in the lepra reaction. International Journal of Dermatology, 17(1), 82-84.
- Sheskin, J., & Zeimer, R. (1977). In vivo study of trace elements in leprous skin. International Journal of Dermatology, 16(9), 745-747.
