= Sergey Pavlovich Morozov =

Russian radiologist

Sergey Pavlovich Morozov (Russian: Сергей Павлович Морозов; born 10 March 1979) is a Russian radiologist and healthcare official.

== Background and career ==
Sergey Morozov was born in Moscow on March 10, 1979. In 2002, he graduated from I.M. Sechenov First Moscow State Medical University with honors with a degree in Internal Medicine. In 2002–2004, he completed postgraduate training in Diagnostic Imaging and Radiography at Sechenov University and the Moscow State University of Medicine and Dentistry and fellowship programs at the University of Illinois in Chicago, Memorial Sloan-Kettering Cancer Center (USA), Oslo University (Norway), and Universita La Sapienza (Italy).

In 2004, Sergey Morozov completed his candidate thesis working on functional magnetic resonance imaging; his doctoral thesis on diagnostic imaging in orthopedics was accepted in 2010. Sergey Morozov received the master's degree from the Harvard School of Public Health (Boston, USA) in 2006, followed by another master's degree from the Russian Presidential Academy of National Economy and Public Administration in Economics and Business Administration in 2013. Sergey Morozov became a professor of Radiology and Radiotherapy in 2015 and a Certified Imaging Informatics Professional (CIIP) in 2017, completing a certification program at the Society for Imaging Informatics in Medicine (SIIM). During his early career, Morozov was a radiologist at the Radiology Department of I.M. Sechenov Moscow Medical Academy. In 2007–2013, he headed the Department of X-Ray and MR Diagnostics at the Moscow Central Clinical Hospital. Since 2004, Morozov has been a lecturer at the Department of Radiology and Radiotherapy of Sechenov University, holding the positions of a teaching assistant, associate professor, and later becoming a professor. From 2013, Morozov was the medical school rector and radiology department head at the European Medical Center. In December 2015, he was appointed CEO of the Moscow Center for Diagnostics & Telemedicine of the Moscow Healthcare Department.

In 2016–2018, Morozov was the president of the European Society of Medical Imaging Informatics (EuSoMII). He became the Chief External Officer for Radiology of the Moscow Healthcare Department in 2015 and the Chief External Officer for Radiology and Instrumental Diagnostics in 2019 to chair the expert certification panel in Radiology, Diagnostic Ultrasonography, and Radiography. In 2017, he was promoted to Chief Regional Radiology and Instrumental Diagnostics Officer of the Ministry of Health of the Russian Federation for the Central Federal District. Morozov is the chair of the Moscow Regional Office of the Russian Society of Radiologists and Radiotherapists (MRO of RSRR) and the founder of Management in Radiology (MIR) national school and MIR international summit. He is a member of ESR committees, organizer and Chair of Artificial Intelligence in Healthcare subcommittee, and member of the Expert Council of the Moscow International Medical Cluster (Skolkovo).

Morozov is a co-organizer and academic director of Healthcare Management: Leaders of Change graduation program at the Moscow School of Management SKOLKOVO. He founded Digital Diagnostics peer-reviewed scientific journal and is its Deputy Editor-In-Chief. Moreover, Morozov is an editorial board member at Diagnostic and Interventional Radiology, Journal of Telemedicine and E-Health, and Medical Visualization. After the beginning of the special operation in February 2022, he left Russia and accepted a position of Innovations Director in a Belgian company, specializing in IT solutions for radiology.

== Research ==
Morozov is an author and co-author of more than 250 papers, monographs, and books. He owns 28 patents and certificates of invention and has supervised five PhD thesis. Russian Science Citation Index (SPIN) 8542-1720.

Morozov co-initiated and developed Radiography Guidelines (effective in Russia from 2021) and took part in the development of the new Ultrasound Guidelines, Occupational Standards for Radiographers, and Diagnostic Imaging Guidelines in COVID-19. He organized the pilot projects on Moscow LDCT Lung Cancer Screening and Moscow Breast Cancer Screening and created the National Ranking of Radiology Departments, which has been calculated annually since 2018. In 2016–2018, he promoted the creation of a PET/CT imaging system that can be accessible to general public.

Morozov is a co-author and co-editor of Artificial Intelligence in Medical Imaging published by Springer Science+Business Media, which provides a historical overview of artificial intelligence use in radiology, its technical background, and discusses the impact of new and emerging technologies on medical imaging. Morozov is an initiator and co-author of the Fundamentals of Management in Radiology.

As a strong supporter of digitalization of healthcare, automation of diagnostic imaging, development of innovative technologies and methods, their incorporation into clinical practice, and big data use in healthcare, Morozov initiated the creation of the Unified Radiological Information Service and the launch of the Moscow Experiment on the Use of Innovative Computer Vision Technologies for Analysis of Medical Images. In 2019, he piloted a project to equip outpatient radiology departments with speech recognition systems. In 2020, at the Moscow Center for Diagnostics & Telemedicine, Morozov facilitated the foundation of Moscow Radiology Reference Center, the first teleradiology center in the Russian public healthcare sector.

At the Moscow Center for Diagnostics and Telemedicine, Morozov supervises a research team that managed to collect the world's largest dataset of anonymized chest CT scans of patients with confirmed COVID-19.

== Awards and honors ==
- Moscow Physician, Radiology
- Pirogov Order for fighting COVID-19
- Three-time Moscow Government Prize winner (Medicine)
- 2016 Person of the Year in Healthcare

== Publications ==
- ESR/ERS statement paper on lung cancer screening
- Diffusion processes modeling in magnetic resonance imaging
- Three-dimensional description of the angular artery in the nasolabial fold
- The course of the angular artery in the midface: Implications for surgical and minimally invasive procedures
- Quantitative parameters of MRI and 18 F-FDG PET/CT in the prediction of breast cancer prognosis and molecular type: An original study
- Calvarial volume loss and facial aging: A computed tomographic (CT)-based study
- The relationship between bone remodeling and the clockwise rotation of the facial skeleton: A computed tomographic imaging-based evaluation
- Age and gender differences of the frontal bone: A computed tomographic (CT)-based study
