= Yakir Yerushalayim =

Jerusalem Municipality award

- Native name: יַקִּיר יְרוּשָׁלַיִם
- Awarded for: Outstanding contribution to the cultural and educational life of Jerusalem
- Country: Israel
- Presented by: Mayor of Jerusalem
- Eligibility: Aged 65+
- Status: Active
- Established: 1967
- Website: https://www.jerusalem.muni.il/he/city/yakir/

Yakir Yerushalayim (Hebrew: יַקִּיר יְרושָׁלַיִם, lit. 'Honored of Jerusalem'), officially titled the Worthy Citizen of Jerusalem award, is an annual civic honor bestowed by the Jerusalem Municipality. Inaugurated in 1967, it recognizes individuals who have made outstanding contributions to the city's cultural, social, and educational life.

To be eligible, candidates must be at least 65 years old. Recipients are selected by a five-member committee appointed by the Mayor, which evaluates nominees based on their life story and their impact on the city. Recommendations are submitted by city council members, with the final selection occurring each spring. The awards are traditionally presented on Yom Yerushalayim (Jerusalem Day).

There are eight categories for the award: Education; Culture; Public Service; Promoting Unity and Tolerance; Volunteering, Charity, and Kindness; Research and Academia; Religion and Israeli Heritage; and Development and Infrastructure. To ensure comprehensive coverage, the award is given in at least six of these categories annually, with all eight covered over any two-year cycle.

Honorees are entitled to be interred in the Yakir Yerushalayim section of Har HaMenuchot Cemetery.

== Notable recipients ==
Year	Name	Background
1967	Ben-Zion Dinur	Educator, historian and Israeli government minister
1967	Samuel Hugo Bergmann	Jewish philosopher
1967	Naftali Herz Tur-Sinai	Bible scholar, an author, and linguist
1967	Shlomo Yosef Zevin	Eminent Orthodox rabbi
1968	Yitzhak Baer	Historian and expert in medieval Spanish Jewish history
1968	Ludwig Blum	Jerusalem painter
1968	Berl Locker	Zionist activist and Israeli politician
1968	Benjamin Mazar	Historian and archaeologist
1968	Rachel Katznelson-Shazar	Political figure, wife of Zalman Shazar, the third President of Israel
1968	Miriam Yalan-Shteklis	Children's author
1969	David Benvenisti	Historian and geographer
1969	William F. Albright	Archaeologist and biblical scholar
1969	Gershom Scholem	Jewish philosopher and historian
1970	Simon Halkin	Poet and novelist
1970	Pinchas Litvinovsky	Artist
1970	Moshe Rachmilewitz	Physician
1970	Anna Ticho	Artist
1974	Mordecai Ardon	Artist
1974	Moshe Zvi Segal	Rabbi and prominent member of Etzel and Lechi
1974	Zev Vilnay	Geographer
1977	Marc Chagall	Artist
1978	George Douglas Young	Christian Zionist and Theologian
1980	Louis Isaac Rabinowitz	Deputy mayor of Jerusalem, rabbi and philologist
1981	Leo Picard	Geologist and expert in the field of hydrology
1982	Walter Frankl	Botanist
1984	Nahman Avigad	Archaeologist
1984	Nathan J. Saltz	University professor and surgeon
1984	Reuven Shari	Israeli politician
1988	Marguerite Bernes	Algerian nun and recognised as Righteous Among the Nations
1988	Elisheva Cohen	Israel Museum curator
1989	Marcel-Jacques Dubois	Roman Catholic theologian and professor of religion at Hebrew University of Jerusalem
1989	Joshua Prawer	Historian
1989	Zerach Warhaftig	Israeli lawyer and politician
1990	Israel Eldad	Former Zionist political activist and Revisionist Zionist philosopher
1991	Yaakov Arnon	Israeli politician
1991	Reuven Feuerstein	Psychologist and director of the International Center for the Enhancement of Learning Potential
1992	Yemima Avidar-Tchernovitz	Children's author
1995	Colette Aboulker-Muscat	Natural physician
1995	Zehava Malkiel	Activist for the International Council of Jewish Women
1995	Josef Tal	Composer
1996	Avraham Biran	Archaeologist and excavator of Tel Dan
1997	Martin Kieselstein	Doctor, assistance to the elderly of Jerusalem
1997	Jacob Sheskin	Professor at Hadassah Hospital, head of the Hansen Hospital in Jerusalem
2000	Itzhak Nener	Jurist who served as vice president of Liberal International, cofounded the International Association of Jewish Lawyers and Jurists, and was elected to the Municipality of Jerusalem
2001	Menachem Elon	Professor of Law specializing in Mishpat Ivri, Deputy President and Justice of the Israeli Supreme Court
2002	Yechiel Grebelsky	Pioneer of Jerusalem stone industry
2002	Yehuda Kiel	Educator and bible commentator, who headed the Da'at Miqra project
2002	Meier Schwarz	Professor emeritus for plant physiology and director of the Synagogue Memorial
2002	Els Bendheim	Born and raised in Amsterdam, contributed to helping medical and educational institutions in Jerusalem
2004	Miriam Ben-Porat	Former Supreme Court judge and former State Comptroller
2004	Netiva Ben Yehuda	Author, editor, and former soldier of the Palmach
2005	Shlomo Merzel	Educator and director of Horev Torah institutions
2006	Robert Aumann	Nobel Prize–winning mathematician
2006	Emanuel Zisman	Israeli politician and former ambassador
2007	Geulah Cohen	Israeli politician and journalist
2008	Yehuda Bauer	Historian and Professor of Holocaust Studies, Hebrew University of Jerusalem
2010	David Kroyanker	Architect and architectural historian of Jerusalem
2010	Nahum Rakover	Professor emeritus of Bar-Ilan University and former Deputy Attorney General
2010	Shulamit Kishik-Cohen	Israeli spy who worked to rescue Jews from Arab countries
2012	Shlomo Aronson	Landscape Architect and City Planner
2013	Ruth Kark	Historical geographer, Hebrew University of Jerusalem
2014	Hagai Sitton	Lawyer and public activist
2014	Chaim Yeshayahu Hadari	Rabbi, founding Rosh Yeshiva and current Rosh Yeshiva emeritus of Yeshivat Hakotel in the Old City
2014	Rachel Chalkowski	Chief Midwife at Shaare Zedek and founder of important charity Matan B'Seter Bamb
2016	Menashe Eichler	Military volunteer
2017	Adin Steinsaltz	Chabad Chasidic rabbi, teacher, philosopher, social critic, author, translator and publisher
2017	Eliyahu Gabai	Member of the Knesset for the National Religious Party (1996–1999, 2006–2009)
2017	David Blumberg	Senior banker and public figure active in promoting culture and education in Israel
2018	Gabriel Barkay	World-renowned archaeologist.
2018	Avraham Rivkind	Head of the department of general surgery and trauma unit of Hadassah Medical Center
2019	Menachem Hacohen	Knesset member for Alignment (1974–1988); chief rabbi of the Moshavim Movement and Histadrut
2020	Tamar Peretz	Israeli doctor and researcher, professor at the Hebrew University School of Medicine in Jerusalem.
2020	Yehoram Gaon	Singer, actor, director, comedian, producer, TV and radio host, and public figure.
2020	Kalman Samuels	Founder of Shalva, the Israel Association for the Care and Rehabilitation of Persons with Disabilities
2021	Ezra Yachin	Lehi fighter who fought in the 1948 Palestine war, lecturer for IDF soldiers
2022	Galila Ron-Feder Amit	Children books author.
2025	Shalva Weil	Israeli historian

== See also ==
- List of honorary citizens of Tel Aviv
