= Pirate Pay =

Anti-piracy software

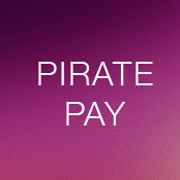
- Industry: P2P blocking
- Products: Pirate Pay, Zilion Data
- Website: http://piratepay.net

Pirate Pay is a software toolset used in the copy protection and content management of torrents, for authors and publishers. Pirate Pay operates on the Japanese, Russian and Indian markets. Eighty-five percent of Pirate Pay clients come from outside Russia. Pirate Pay technology blocks approximately 5 million illegal downloads per month, processing about 1500 torrent-seeds. According to Dasreda, this translates into around $8 million of savings for copyright holders. Pirate Pay is widely used around the world.

== History ==
Pirate Pay was first presented at a second start-up tour in the city of Perm in April 2010-2011. The founders were brothers Andrei and Alexei Klimenko, along with their friend Dmitry Shuvaev, established the Limited Liability Company called "Internet Content." The initial investment of $34,000 was furnished by the brothers, who retain ownership of the firm.

=== 2010 ===
Pirate Pay participated in three competitions:

- Finalists at BIT 2010.
- Won "Best Business Model" in a competition for technology start-ups organized by the CRFD fund.
- Won a grant at a competition at the "Higher School of Economics".

=== 2011 ===
- In March 2011, the company won the first competition for IT projects organized by Microsoft and received seed funding from the Foundation, a grant of $100,000.
- In April 2011, the company's application passed through the competitive selection process for the S.T.A.R.T. program. In May the company signed a $34,000 government contract with the Foundation for Assistance to Small Innovative Enterprises in Science and Technology (Bortnik Fund).
- On 25 May 2011, Pirate Pay became finalists of Red Herring Top 100 Europe. This group of 100 companies is an organization of the most innovative from a pool of hundreds from across Europe. The Top 100 are evaluated on both quantitative and qualitative criteria, such as financial performance, technology innovation, quality of management, execution of strategy and integration into their respective industries.
- In December 2011, the first experiment with an "alpha" version of the service including the film: Vysotsky. Thanks to God, I’m Alive.

=== 2012 ===
- The company received Skolkovo resident status and received a grant of $1.2 million.
- Pirate Pay established a partnership with Japanese company Unidam.

=== 2013 ===
- In the spring of 2013, Pirate Pay received $68,000 from the program “START-2”.

== Technical details ==
Pirate Pay works with info-hashes of content in worldwide Peer-to-peer network. It does not remove links and deals without interaction with torrent sites, link aggregators and search engines. Protection of content from illegal distribution can be started with only the title. Thousands of code strings operate without human intervention to detect the required title name in file sharing swarms. It is directly placed on protection and executes all necessary actions to prevent content downloading by leeches and uploading by seeders. Pirate Pay operates with the technology of first uploader search in the swarm, finding the first infringer for offline legal activities.

== Other products ==
- Zillion Data
- Fair Play
