= Tamar Peretz =

Israeli doctor and researcher

- תמר פרץ
- Born: 1955 (age 70–71); Gdańsk
- Education: Hebrew University of Jerusalem
- Occupations: Academic; doctor
- Website: https://www.proftamarperetz.com

Tamar (Tami) Peretz (Hebrew: תמר פרץ) is an Israeli doctor and researcher, professor at the Hebrew University School of Medicine in Jerusalem.

Peretz was the director of the Sharett Institute of Oncology at Hadassah Ein Kerem Medical Center and as the director of Hadassah Medical Center in Jerusalem. Peretz's areas of practice include: breast cancer research and treatment, immunological approaches to cancer treatment, and the development of cancer treatment using medical cannabis.

== Biography ==
=== Medical career ===
Tamar Peretz (maiden name Jablonski), grew up in Gdansk, Poland and immigrated to Israel in 1957. In 1980 she graduated from the Hebrew University School of Medicine and in 1986 completed her internship in oncology at Hadassah Ein Kerem Hospital. In the years 1987–1989 she was in training at the Memorial Sloan Kettering Cancer Center in New York.

From 1986 to 1994 she was a senior physician in the Department of Oncology at Hadassah Ein Kerem Hospital.

In 1993–1994 she was acting director of the Sharett Institute of Oncology and in 1994–2020 was permanent director.

Since 1998 she was also director of the Center for Malignant Breast Diseases at Hadassah.

=== Academic and research activities ===
Peretz is a lecturer in oncology at the Hebrew University School of Medicine. In 1992 she was appointed senior lecturer, in 1996 associate professor, and in 2006 full professor.

Peretz holds the Lawrence Schecht Chair in Oncology. She has won dozens of research grants and has published (in collaboration with other researchers) 140 articles in scientific journals and dozens of other publications.

In 2005–2009 Peretz chaired the Committee for Clinical Studies at the Hebrew University School of Medicine, and from 2009 she was Deputy Dean of Teaching Affairs.

Peretz is a member of many medical associations in Israel and around the world, including the American Clinical Oncology Association, the European Association for Cancer Research and the Israeli Association of Women Physicians. She lectures in academic and other forums.

Peretz is active in various professional and public associations. Among other things, she is a member of the National Council of Oncology and a member of the Central Committee of the Israel Medical Association.

In 2011 Peretz was one of the candidates for the position of director general of Hadassah Medical Center. In June 2014, she was appointed interim director of Hadassah Hospitals. She ended her position in February 2016. In 2020, she retired from her position as director of the Sharett Institute of Oncology.

Since 2019 Peretz has been researching and developing solutions for breast cancer that incorporate cannabis. Thus, Professor Peretz joined the medical committee of the Kanashur company and also collaborates in the development of similar drugs at the Kanbotek company.

Peretz received the Yakir Yerushalayim Prize for 2004. She is married and a mother of two.
