= Marguerite Bernes =

Algerian nun

Sister Marguerite Bernes
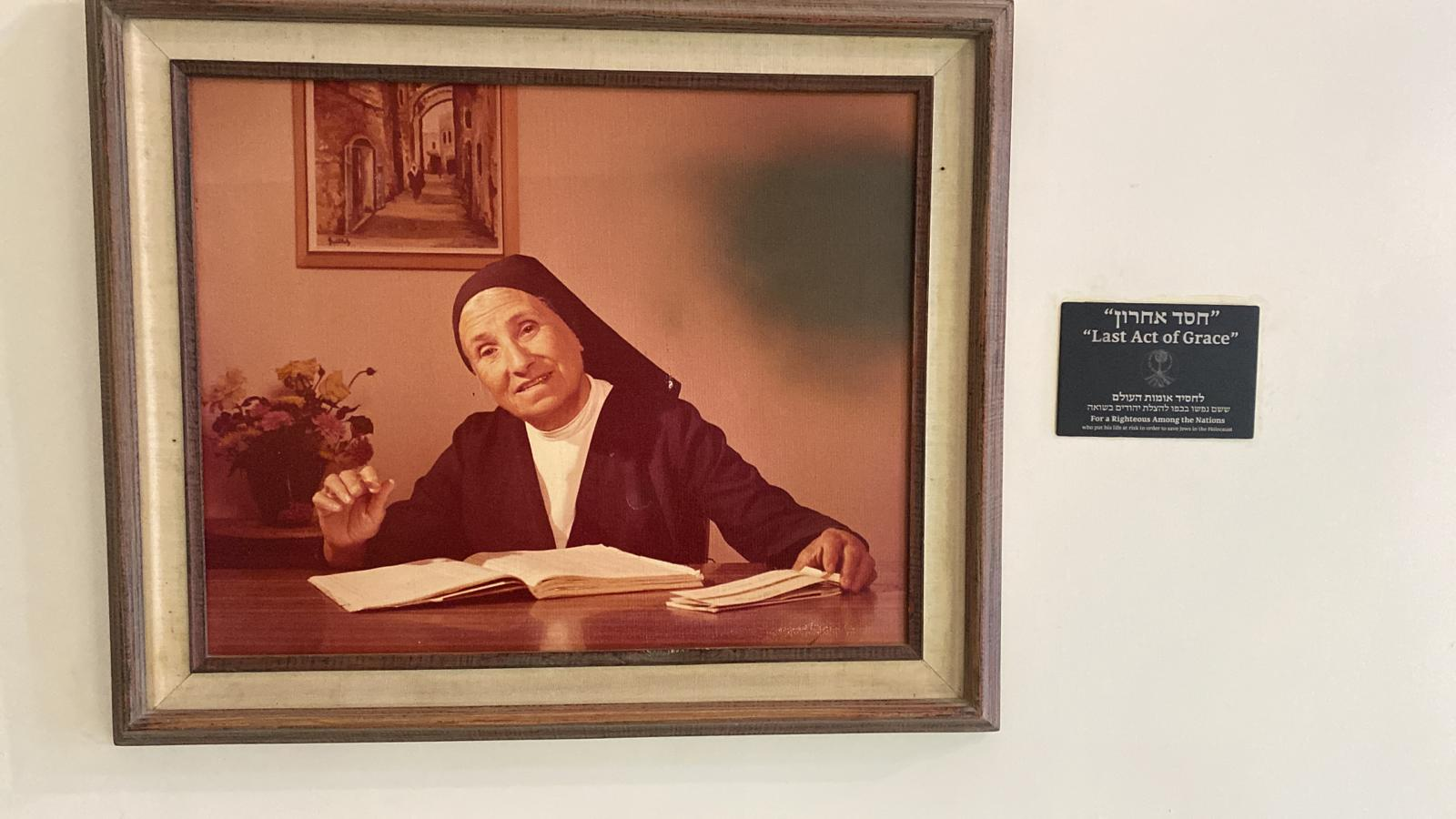

Personal life
- Born: 30 September 1901 Algiers, Algeria
- Died: 3 April 1996 (aged 94) Alexandria, Egypt
- Honours: Righteous Among the Nations

Religious life
- Religion: Roman Catholic

Sister Marguerite Claire Bernes (30 September 1901 – 13 April 1996) was an Algerian nun of the Daughters of Charity. She moved to Italy in the 1930s, hid Jewish families during Nazi German occupation, and was later recognised as Righteous Among the Nations.

== Early life ==
Bernes was born in 1901 in Algiers, Algeria, to French parents. The family moved to Marseilles, France, when she was 5 years old.

Bernes became a Roman Catholic nun in the Daughters of Charity when she was 27 years old. In 1933, she moved to Italy where she served as an assistant to the Mother Superior of a convent in Prati district of Rome, located opposite the Church of San Giaocchino where she ran the soup kitchen.

== World War II ==
After the Nazis occupied Rome, Bernes collaborated with Prati parish priest Father Antonio Dressino to hide Jewish refugees. In September 1943, Arrigo and Anita Finzi and their children fled to the convent. Bernes helped to hide the Finzi family and other Jewish refuges in the cupola of San Gioacchino and in the bell tower of another nearby church. For seven months, even when bread was rationed, Bernes secretly provided food for the Jewish refugees. She also catered for the women's personal needs.

An informer told the Germans that Jews were being sheltered by the convent and the Gestapo broke in and arrested several of the people in hiding. The Finzi children escaped and Bernes found a hiding place for them in another convent.

== Life after the war ==
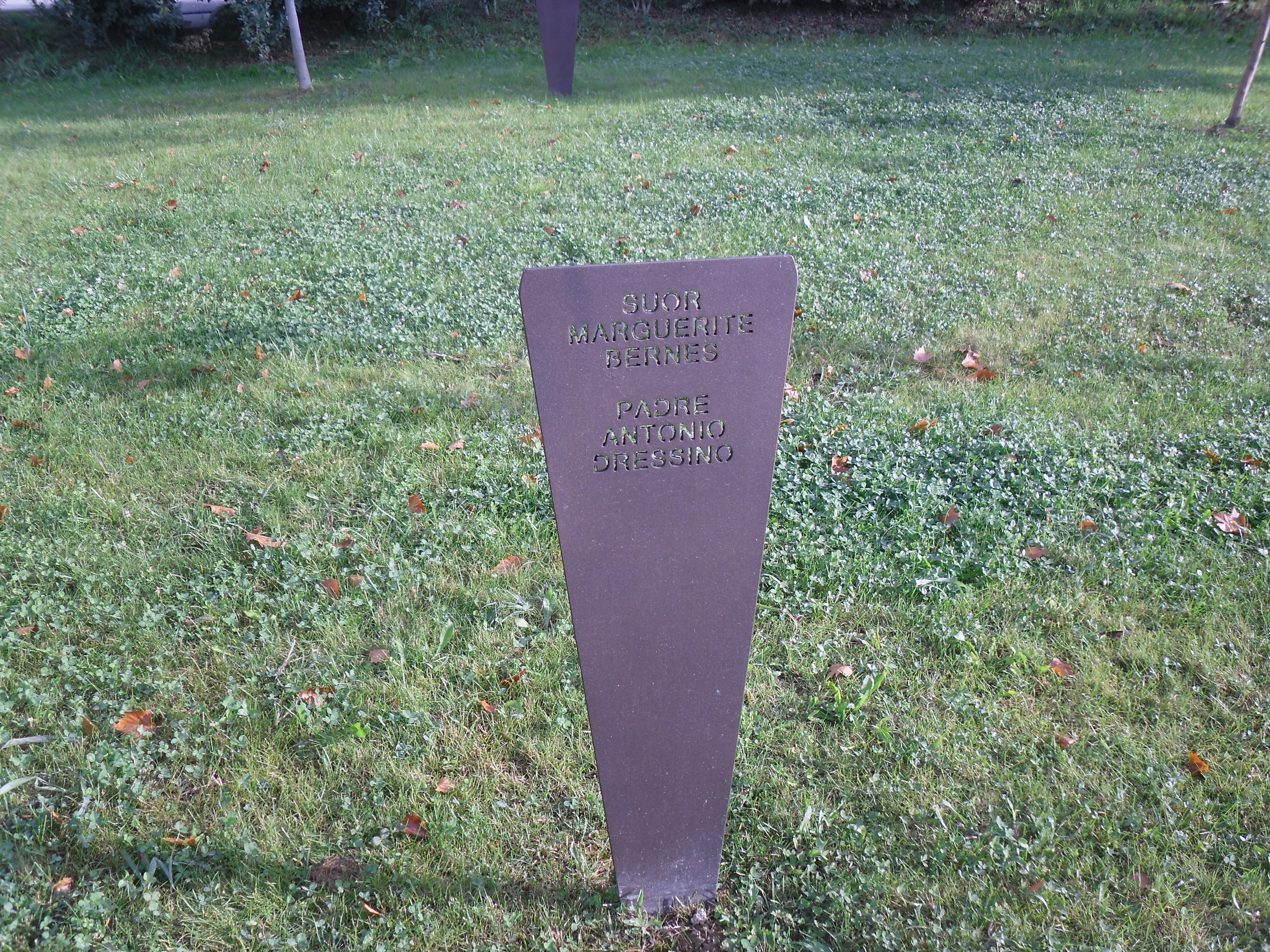
Stele dedicated to Bernes and Marco Antonio Dressino [it] in the Garden of the Righteous of the World [it] in Padua

Bernes moved to Jerusalem in 1953, where she was Mother Superior of the Saint Vincent de Paul hospice for disabled children in Ein Karem. In 1988, she was recognised as a Worthy Citizen of Jerusalem (Yakir Yerushalayim). The Finzi family also visited Bernes whilst she was living in Jerusalem.

On 15 August 1974, Bernes was recognised by the Israeli Holocaust memorial centre Yad Vashem as Righteous Among the Nations. She said of this honour that "we simply did our duty."

She died in 1996 in Alexandria, Egypt.
