= Hagai Sitton =

- חגי סיטון
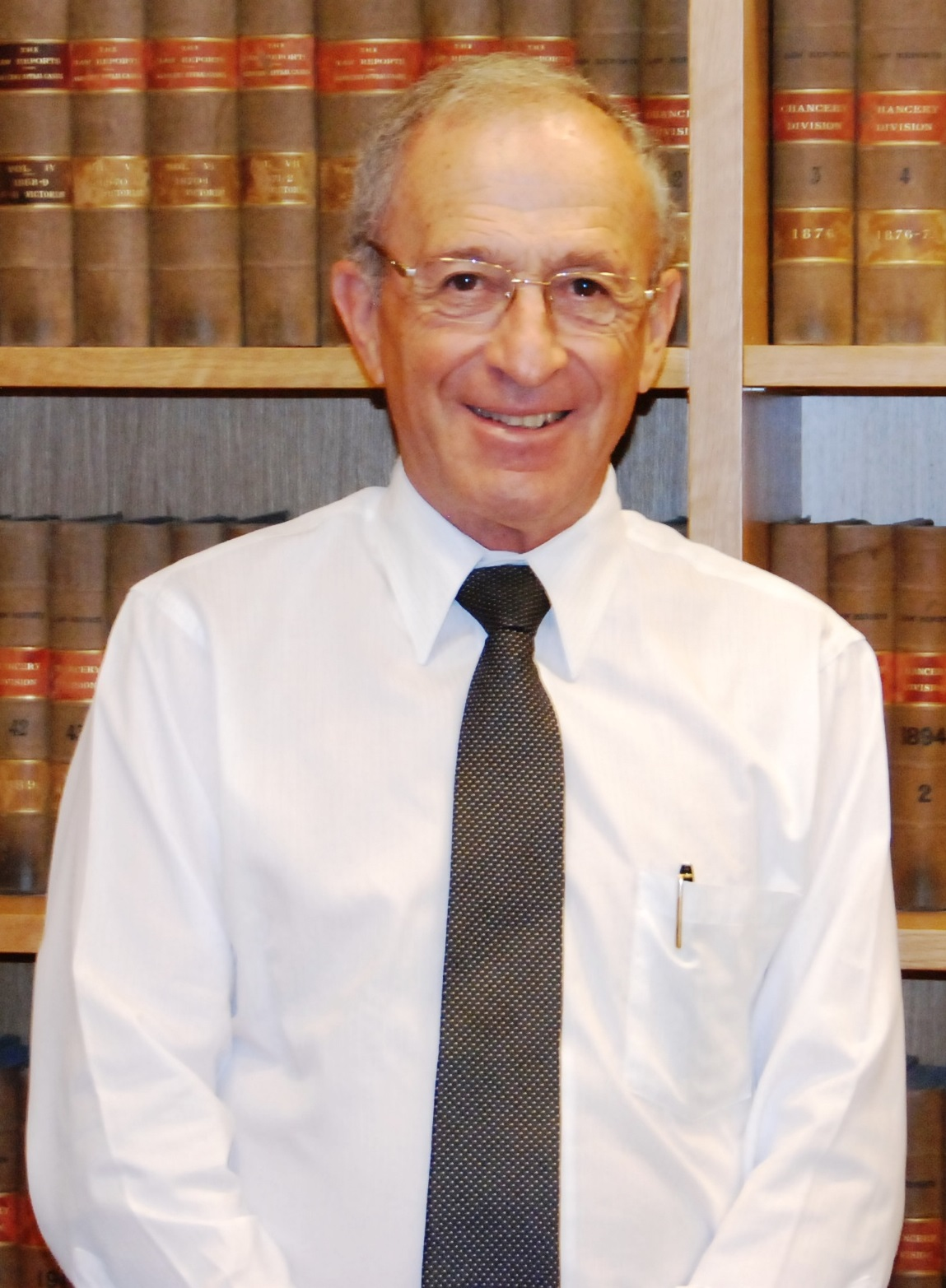
- Born: 8 September 1939 (age 87); Jerusalem, Mandatory Palestine
- Education: Hebrew University of Jerusalem
- Occupations: Lawyer, Notary public, Mediator, Arbitrator
- Spouse: Karen Liptzin Sitton
- Children: Ron Sitton, Gil Sitton, Shira Sitton-Dvorachek
- Awards: Yakir Yerushalayim (2014)
- Honours: Honorary doctorate, Ariel University (2025)

Hagai Sitton (born September 8, 1939) is an Israeli lawyer and managing partner at the firm "Spaer, Sitton & Henig." Sitton serves as the chairman of several cultural and social associations and funds. In 2014, he was awarded the Worthy Citizen of Jerusalem (Yakir Yerushalayim) title. In 2025, he received an Honorary Doctorate from Ariel University.

== Biography ==
Sitton was born on 8 September 1939 in Jerusalem (then Mandatory Palestine), the son of Levana (née Hasson, from the Jewish community in Hebron) and Yosef Sitton. He attended Beit HaKerem elementary school and Beit HaKerem high school (later known as Leyada – The Hebrew University Secondary School). In his youth, he was active and served as a counselor in "HaTnua HaMe'uhedet" youth movement and worked with troubled youth. In 1957, he enlisted in the Israel Defense Forces (IDF) and served in the Nahal brigade, in the "Kadesh" gar'in of HaTnua HaMe'uhedet. In 1965, he completed his Bachelor of Law degree at the Hebrew University of Jerusalem.

In the IDF reserve duty, he served in the Reconnaissance Unit of the Jerusalem Brigade, and fought in the Six-Day War (1967) in the battles for Armon HaNatziv (Government House), HaPa'amon post, and Sur Baher. During the Yom Kippur War (1973), he was on prolonged reserve duty on the banks of the Suez Canal, and documented the service with 8mm film footage (screened under the name "The Soldiers of Winter 1973"). Subsequently, he served as a liaison officer to the Multinational Force in Lebanon and Sinai, as a prosecutor and a military judge in the military courts, and later as a presiding judge in the Military Advocate General's Corps. Sitton was discharged with the rank of Major.

== Legal career ==
In October 1965, Sitton was admitted as a member of the Israel Bar Association. He interned at the Ministry of Justice and at the firm "Spaer-Tussia Cohen & Co.," specializing in litigation. In 1977, he joined attorney Arnold Spaer as a partner, and since 1980, he has served as the managing partner at the firm "Spaer, Sitton, Henig Law Office". In 1988, he was admitted to the New York State Bar Association in the United States. Sitton specializes in litigation across all jurisdictions, real estate and tenant protection law, planning and construction, torts and medical malpractice, intellectual property, contracts, taxation, and antiquities. Sitton holds a mediator certificate from the Hebrew University and is a public notary, as well as a member of the Arbitration Federation of the Bar Association and serves as an arbitrator.

== Sitton vs. the Israel Broadcasting Authority (C.C. 18048/95) ==
In 1995, the Israel Broadcasting Authority (IBA) produced and aired a drama series called "Sitton," which featured a character named Sitton, who was an attorney. At the time, a highly-publicized criminal trial was taking place in the United States, in which baseball player O. J. Simpson was accused of murdering his ex-wife and another man. His attorney succeeded in having Simpson acquitted of the charges, although many believed he had committed the murders. In promoting the television series in Israel, the IBA publicly advertised, including on buses, with the slogan: "Attorney Sitton congratulates O. J. Simpson's lawyers." Attorney Hagai Sitton claimed this harmed his reputation, as his circle of acquaintances and clients believed the advertisement was issued by him.

Sitton filed a lawsuit against the IBA and the bus company, both for defamation and invasion of privacy. The claim was rejected in the magistrate court, where the judge reasoned that there was nothing wrong with words of congratulation on the one hand, and there was no proof that the advertisement specifically referred to attorney Hagai Sitton. Sitton filed an appeal to the District Court. In the appeal, he argued that there were no other attorneys named 'Sitton' at the time, and therefore the public identified him with the character in the series, thereby invading his privacy. Additionally, the public identified him as the person who celebrated Simpson's acquittal, thereby defaming him. Conversely, the defense argued that the series was a fictional creation.

The district court accepted the appeal and determined that the IBA had a duty of care. Before using the name "Sitton", they should have checked if any attorneys held that name. Since the name was relatively rare, and was unique among attorneys in the public sphere at that time, and given that the plaintiff was a well-known attorney in Jerusalem, it was foreseeable that the public would connect the character with him. The court ruled that this constituted an invasion of privacy and that the plaintiff's good name had been damaged, thus constituting libel. The ruling emphasized the balance between artistic freedom of expression and the right to a good name, stating that in this case, the right to a good name prevailed. The IBA was ordered to pay financial compensation to Hagai Sitton.

== Public activities ==
Sitton is extensively active in public, cultural, and civic institutions:

- Israel Bar Association: Member of the Jerusalem District Committee, Treasurer of the Committee, Chairman of the District Ethics Committee, Member of the National Ethics Committee, Member of the National Council, Deputy Chairman of the Courts Forum, and Member of the National Disciplinary Tribunal.
- Member of the Central Elections Committee and Supreme Zionist Court of the World Zionist Organization.
- Chairman of the Reuben Hecht Foundation and the Hecht Museum at the University of Haifa.
- Chairman of the Board of Ticho House Museum (Israel Museum).
- Chairman of the Board of the Old Yishuv Court Museum.
- Member of the Board of the Museum for Islamic Art.
- Member of the board of trustees of the University of Haifa.
- Member of the Board of the Association for the Well-being of Israel's Soldiers (AWIS).
- Member of the Board of the Ammunition Hill – The Six-Day War Heritage Center.
- Member of the Board of the Jerusalem Print Workshop Association.
- Founder and Chairman of the "Beit HaKerem for Environmental Quality" Association.
- Legal Advisor and Member of the Board of The Hebrew University Secondary School (Leyada).
- Member of the Public Committee for Determining the Salary of Knesset Members.
