= Meier Schwarz =

Israeli plant physiologist (1926–2022)

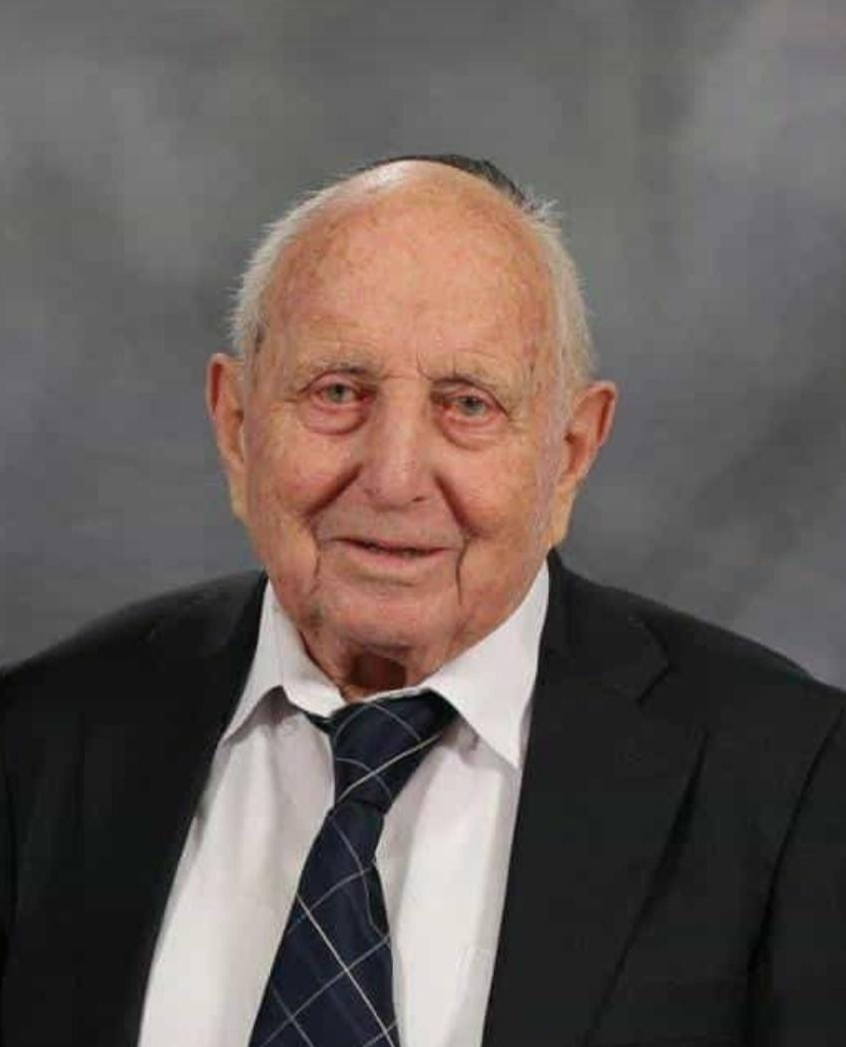
Meier Schwarz

Meier Schwarz (Hebrew: מאיר שוורץ; 28 January 1926 – 12 January 2022) was an Israeli plant physiologist. He was born in Nuremberg, Germany, and escaped from the Nazi regime on a Kindertransport to Jerusalem. In Israel, he was a lecturer and scholar and was appointed head of the Hydroponics department at the Jacob Blaustein Institute for Desert Research in Beersheba.

== Biography ==
Born in Nuremberg, Bavaria, Germany, Meier Schwarz was the child of Jewish parents. His father, Ludwig Schwarz, merchant, born in Egenhausen/Ansbach, was a German army officer in the First World War, and was highly decorated. Ludwig Schwarz was board member of the Orthodox Jewish ″Adas Isroel″ congregation in Nuremberg. He was murdered by the Nazis in September 1937. According to official records, Schwarz's mother Meta Schwarz, née Stern, who was born in Blaufelden, died in March 1940 due to a "shortage of medicine." In fact the Nazis did not provide Jews with medicine. Schwarz's only brother Joseph was head of the Hakhshara in Neuendorf/Fürstenwalde. He was murdered in 1943 in Auschwitz.

Following the Night of Broken Glass in November 1938, the family succeeded in organizing Meier Schwarz's emigration. He managed to flee in a Kindertransport to Jerusalem. He was one of the early pioneers of Kibbutz Hafetz Hayim and became an active member of the Jewish underground organization, the Haganah. At the age of 22 he was the commander of one of the three ″Exodus″ ships, the "Ocean Vigour".

After the establishment of the state of Israel, Schwarz worked as teacher and farmer. For 20 years he lived on Kibbutz Hafetz Haim, and spent another 14 years in Petah Tikva before moving to Jerusalem in 1973. There he lived with his wife Mirjam, a survivor of Auschwitz, in Jerusalem's Old City. They had seven children, as well as many grandchildren and great grandchildren. Schwarz died in Jerusalem on 12 January 2022, at the age of 95.

== Academic career ==
Among Schwarz's academic achievements is the development of hydroculture (soilless culture) which makes it possible to grow plants in desert areas using minimal irrigation. In this capacity he received a doctorate in plant physiology from the Hebrew University of Jerusalem. He worked as a researcher and advisor in this field in Germany, Singapore, Chile and United States (where he worked for NASA).

Schwarz was head of the Department for Soilless Cultures at the Jacob Blaustein Institute for Desert Research in Beer Sheva. He worked as an inspector for the ministry of education for biology lessons at high schools in Israel, and taught at Bar-Ilan University. For 12 years, he headed the teachers' seminary for science at the Jerusalem College for Women. Schwarz was member of the board of trustees of the University of Haifa.

Schwarz was President of the International Society for Soilless Cultures (ISOSC), and founder of the Natural Sciences Department of Teacher Education at the Jerusalem College and the Jerusalem College of Technology. He also served as President of The International Society of Religious Researchers.

== Public activities ==
Since 1988, as the Director of the Synagogue Memorial and Beit Ashkenaz organizations in Jerusalem, Schwarz has led a project to publish memorial books for the former synagogues of Germany and Austria, and the Jewish communities who built them. He worked with international partners and universities in this capacity. Eight memorial books have been published thus far.

Schwarz was a representative of CENTRA, the organization of Jewish-German immigrants to Israel who arrived in the 1930s. He represented the survivors of German origin in the Union of Survivor Organization and Yad Vashem.

== Published works ==
More than 70 scientific reports and 12 books

== Awards and recognition ==
- Bundesverdienstkreuz 1. Klasse der Bundesrepublik Deutschland (Cross of Merit)
- In 2001, he received the Yakir Yerushalayim Award (″Worthy Citizen of Jerusalem″) from the city of Jerusalem.
