= Mozhaysky District, Moscow =

Mozhaysky District Можайский район (Russian)
- District
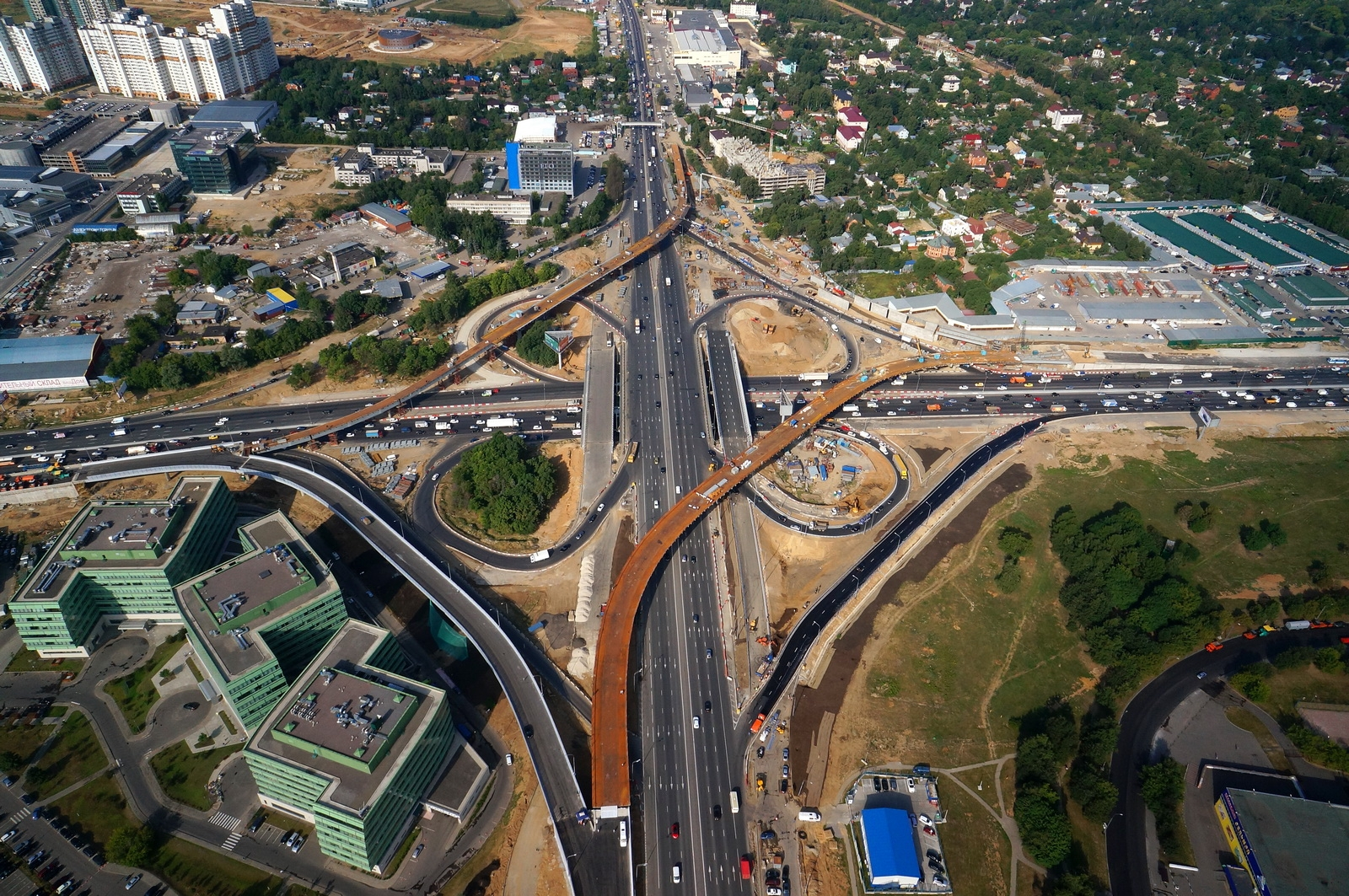
- Ring Road interchange with Mozhayskoe, Mozhaysky District

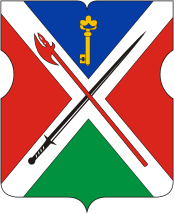
- Flag Coat of arms
- Location of Mozhaysky District in Moscow
- Coordinates: 55°43′N 37°24′E
- Country: Russia
- Federal subject: Federal city of Moscow

Area
  - Total: 17.526 km^{2} (6.767 sq mi)

Population (2010 Census)
  - Total: 132,373
  - Estimate (2013): 135,527
  - Density: 7,552.9/km^{2} (19,562/sq mi)

Municipal structure
  - Municipally incorporated as: Mozhaysky Municipal Okrug
- Time zone: UTC+
- OKTMO ID: 45321000
- Website: http://mozhaiskiy-mos.ru

Population of Mozhaysky District
- 2010 Census: 132,373
- 2002 Census: 109,248

Mozhaysky District (Russian: Можа́йский райо́н) is a territorial division (a district, or raion) in Western Administrative Okrug, one of the 125 in the federal city of Moscow, Russia. It is located in the west of the federal city. The area of the district is 17.526 square kilometers (6.767 sq mi). As of the 2010 Census, the total population of the district was 132,373. Mozhaysky District takes its name after Mozhayskoe Highway, the district's major road, which in turn was named after the old Mozhayskaya road which led to Mozhaysk town, located 110 kilometers (68 mi) to the west of Moscow, which was protecting west approach routes to Moscow since 13th century.

From 1 July, 2012, the district also includes the territory of the Skolkovo Innovation Center.

As a municipal division, the district is incorporated as Mozhaysky Municipal Okrug.

== Education ==
Moscow Korean School (MKS; 모스크바한국학교), a South Korean international school, is within the district. It is the only European school certified by the South Korean government.
