= Avraham Rivkind =

Israeli physician and surgeon (born 1949)

Avraham "Avi" Rivkind (Hebrew: אברהם ריבקינד; born 1949) is an Israeli physician and surgeon. He is head of the department of general surgery and the trauma unit of Hadassah Medical Center in Ein Karem, Jerusalem. In 2018, he received the Yakir Yerushalayim award. In 2026 he received the Israel Prize for lifetime achievement.

== Biography ==
Avraham Rivkind was born in 1949 and served in the Israel Defense Forces (IDF) from 1967 to 1970. He completed his pre-medical studies at the University of Siena in Italy and received his doctorate in medicine from the Hebrew University of Jerusalem in 1980. Dr. Rivkind has been a pioneer in using cell phone and computer technology to provide important information about a patient to the medical personnel even before arrival at the hospital, saving vital time.

== Medical career ==
Rivkind is the medical director of United Hatzalah, Israel's largest volunteer emergency response organization. He is also an advisor to the surgeon general of the IDF on trauma and ethics. He was the personal physician of the President of Israel, Ezer Weizman. He served a fellowship in traumatology and critical care with the Maryland Institute for Emergency Medical Services Systems (MIEMSS) in Baltimore. He is also a professor at the University of Southern California in trauma and foregut surgery.

Rivkind is revered "for refusing to give up on the most hopeless patients, such as the soldier who was shot in the heart and pronounced dead on arrival and whom Rivkind revived." This soldier was Shimon Ohana, age 18, of the Border Police.

Early in 2015, Rachamim Yisraelov was driving the #10 Dan bus when he saw Dr. Rivkind walking towards his car. Yisraelov stopped the bus (which was nowhere near a scheduled stop), ran towards the surgeon and embraced him warmly, proclaiming: "You saved my sister's life!" When the driver returned to his bus, he got a spontaneous round of applause from the passengers.

Rivkind has said he would like to invite Ismail Haniyeh of Hamas to Hadassah Hospital. "I would start by showing him a 14-year old Palestinian boy I operated on last week - and who was injured when a bomb he was working with blew up. I would ask Haniyeh, 'Look at this boy. Would you want your son to look like this?' And then I would show him the care this boy is getting here ... And I'll ask him, 'Isn't this a better way to live between us?' "

In 2023 he was chosen to light a torch at the beacon lighting ceremony on Mount Herzl on the occasion of the 75th year of the State of Israel.

== Published works ==
- "Awaiting the Wounded," Jewish World, August 18, 2002
