= Elisheva Cohen =

Israeli designer and museum curator

- אלישבע כהן
- Born: 9 January 1911; Frankfurt am Main, Germany
- Died: 20 December 1989 (aged 78); Israel
- Occupations: Designer, museum curator
- Awards: Israel Prize (1977); Yakir Yerushalayim (1989)

Elisheva Cohen (Hebrew: אלישבע כהן; January 9, 1911 – December 20, 1989) was an Israeli designer and museum curator. In 1977, she won the Israel Prize for her contribution to Israeli design. She was given the Yakir Yerushalayim award in 1989.

== Biography ==
Else Elisheva Benjamin Cohen was born in Frankfurt to Heinrich Naftali and Netty (Dulken) Benjamin. Her father was a trader of pearls and precious stones. She had an older brother, Bernhard. She attended a school for Orthodox Jewish girls and later a non-Jewish public high school. She studied art history at the Ludwig-Maximilians-Universität München and also at the University of Frankfurt am Main, the University of Zurich, Heidelberg University, and Marburg University. With the rise of Nazism, she was forced to leave school. She left Germany in 1933. She married Chaim Herman Cohn in Strasbourg on August 15, 1933, and they immigrated together to Palestine. The couple settled in Jerusalem, where Chaim opened a law office. They had two children, Eliyahu and Yehudit.

In 1956, after divorcing her husband, Cohen met Mordechai Narkiss, director of the Bezalel National Museum, who asked her to organize the museum's collection of graphics. She introduced the cataloging system that is still in use today. The first exhibition she curated was of Rembrandt’s etchings and drawings of biblical subjects.

In 1960, she spent three months in England and nine in the United States on a grant from The British Council and the Fulbright Foundation. She was involved in planning the new Israel Museum. The Bezalel National Museum became its Art Wing. In 1968, Cohen became Chief Curator for the Arts in addition to Curator of Prints and Drawings.

Upon her retirement, she became the art advisor of the museum, a post she held for five years. In 1977, she was awarded the Israel Prize, and in 1988 she became an Honorary Citizen of Jerusalem (Yakir Yerushalayim). She was involved in transforming the home of Anna Ticho into a branch of the Israel Museum. She was on the Board of Directors of The Israel Museum and chairperson of Israel’s Council of Museums.

She died on December 20, 1989.

== Curated exhibitions ==
- Bezalel National Museum, Paul Citron: Drawings. Jerusalem: Bezalel National Museum, 1960
- The Israel Museum, Picasso: A Selection of His Graphic Work. Oeuvre Graphique, Collection Georges Bloch [sic]. Zürich: March 24 to May 2, 1966; Jerusalem.
- The Israel Museum, Francisco Goya: two exhibitions of prints. August–September 1967.
- The Israel Museum, Henri de Toulouse-Lautrec: Prints from the F. M. Gross Collection, London, August–September 1967, Jerusalem, The Israel Museum, 1967.
- The Israel Museum, Treasures from Ancient Mexico, winter 1968, Jerusalem.
- The Israel Museum, Gifts from the Georges Bloch Collection, summer 1970, Jerusalem.
- The Israel Museum, Kaethe Kollowitz: Zeichnungen, Radierungen, Lithographien, Holzschnitte, Skulpturen, December 14, 1971 – January 21, 1972, Jerusalem.
- The Israel Museum, The Floersheimer Collection, winter 1972, Jerusalem.
- Städtisches Museum Trier, Jerusalem in Darstellungen von 19 zum 20 Jh., July 3–September 10, 1972, Trier.
- The Israel Museum, Picasso: His Graphic Work in the Israel Museum Collection, January–March 1973, Jerusalem.
- The Israel Museum, Past and Present: The Jan Mitchell Gift to the Israel Museum, summer 1974, Vol. II, Jerusalem.
- The Israel Museum, Herald of a New Age: Goya’s Graphic Work, winter 1975, Jerusalem.
- The Israel Museum, Confrontation and Confirmation: Some Aspects of Connoisseurship, March 1988, Jerusalem.

== Published works ==
- The Pilgrim Artists. Jerusalem: 1969; Künstler als Pilger. Jerusalem: 1969;
- Anna Ticho: Jerusalem Landscapes Drawings and Watercolors. Tel Aviv: 1971;
- “A Drawing by Polidoro da Caravaggio.” The Israel Museum News, Jerusalem: 1972, 62;*
- “A Glimpse into Anna Ticho’s Studio: The Painter of Jerusalem.” Ariel 45–46 (1978): 36–46; *“Moritz Daniel Oppenheim: His Life and Art.” In The Israel Museum, Moritz Oppenheim: The First Jewish Painter. Autumn 1983, Jerusalem: 1983, 7–29;
- “The Landscape Drawings of Anna Ticho.” In The Jewish Museum, New York, Anna Ticho: Drawings, 1971–1980. October 23, 1983–February 19, 1984. New York: 1983; *Anna Ticho. Tel Aviv: 1986;
- “Pascin Dessinature.” In Musée Galerie de la Seita, Pascin 1885–1930, December 14, 1994–February 15, 1995. Paris: 11–30.

== See also ==
- Israeli fashion
- List of Israel Prize recipients
