= Moscow Korean School =

- 모스크바한국학교; Школа при посольстве Республики Корея в Москве

Location
- Ulitsa Tolbukhina, 8к3, Moskva, Russia, 121596 우) 121596 러시아 연방 모스크바 서구 톨부히나 돔 8 코르푸스 3; 121596 Москва, ул. Толбухина, д.8 к.3 Russia
- Coordinates: 55.719259°N 37.404107°E

Information
- Type: Korean international school
- Founded: 1992
- Website: moscowks.net

Moscow Korean School (MKS; Korean: 모스크바한국학교; Russian: Школа при посольстве Республики Корея в Москве "Shkola Pri Posol'stve Respubliki Koreya V Moskve") is a Korean international school in Moscow, Russia. It is the only school approved as a Korean international school by the South Korean government in Europe. As of 2007 it served kindergarten and elementary school. It was formerly in Mozhaysky District.

The school opened in 1992. Around 2012 the school moved into a new building.

== See also ==
- Russia–South Korea relations
