= Moscow International Medical Cluster =

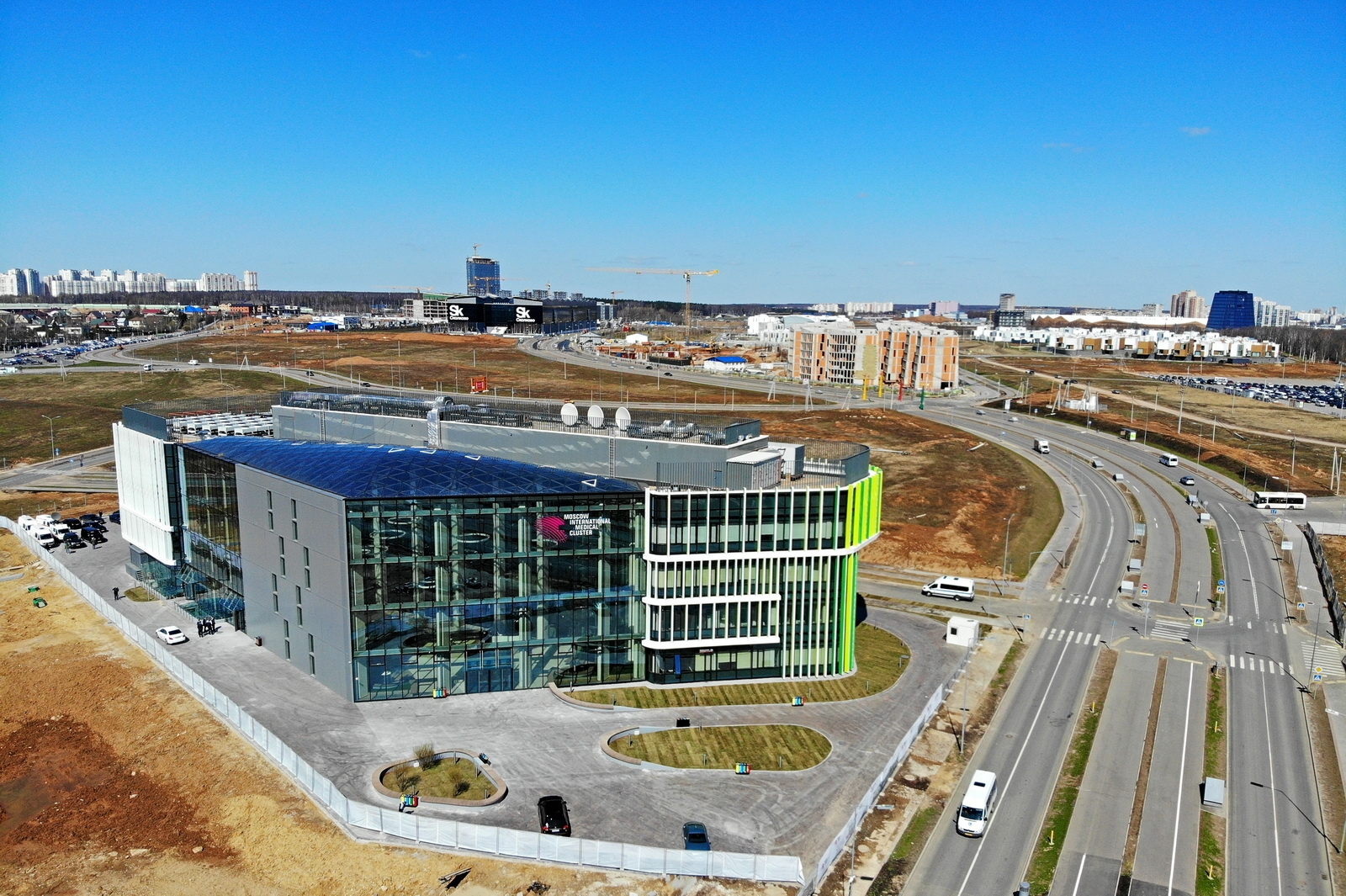
Moscow International Medical Cluster

The Moscow International Medical Cluster (MIMC) is a medical infrastructure project built in Moscow in the area of the Skolkovo Innovation Center; it is aimed at developing the health care ecosystem of Moscow and the Moscow Region. It is planned to establish clinics, training centers and multiprofile research institutions in the MIMC area.

MIMC operations are governed by the Federal Law No. 160 On the International Medical Cluster signed by the Russian President Vladimir Putin on June 30, 2015.

In accordance with Federal Law, members of the cluster providing medical care which is registered in any OECD country are not required to obtain Russian licenses and permits.

The Moscow International Medical Cluster project is implemented by the IMC Foundation and is supervised by the Government of Moscow headed by the Moscow Mayor Sergey Sobyanin.

The concept of the cluster has been developed with the support from The Boston Consulting Group.

Since 2016, Mikhail Yugay, PhD in Medicine, has been CEO of IMC Foundation.

== Chronology ==
On April 12, 2012, Dmitry Medvedev (who was the President of Russia from May 7, 2008 through May 7, 2012) ordered that the Government of Moscow, the Ministry of Health of the Russian Federation, the Ministry of Economic Development of the Russian Federation and Sberbank should submit proposals for creating an international medical cluster in the new areas of Moscow (New Moscow) which was to include treatment, education and research. It was planned to build the cluster in Kommunarka shooting ground in New Moscow.

On June 11, 2015, the State Duma adopted Federal Law No. 160-2015 On the International Medical Cluster stipulating the final location of the project. It was decided that the cluster would be built in Skolkovo rather than in New Moscow.

On June 30, 2015, Russian President Vladimir Putin signed Federal Law No. 160-2015 On the International Medical Cluster.

On August 15, 2016, Moscow Mayor Sergei Sobyanin buried a time capsule in the foundation of the first facility, the Diagnostic Building.

In 2017 the IMC Foundation launched a roadshow to attract potential investors and operators.

The first Project Participation Agreement between Israeli Hadassah Medical Center and International Medical Cluster Foundation was signed on September 14, 2017, in the presence of Moscow Mayor Sergey Sobyanin. The Diagnostic and Outpatient Center will be able to welcome the first patients as early as 2018.
