= Skolkovo Innovation Center =

Business area in Moscow, Russia

Coordinates: 55°41′51″N 37°21′28″E

The logo of Skolkovo

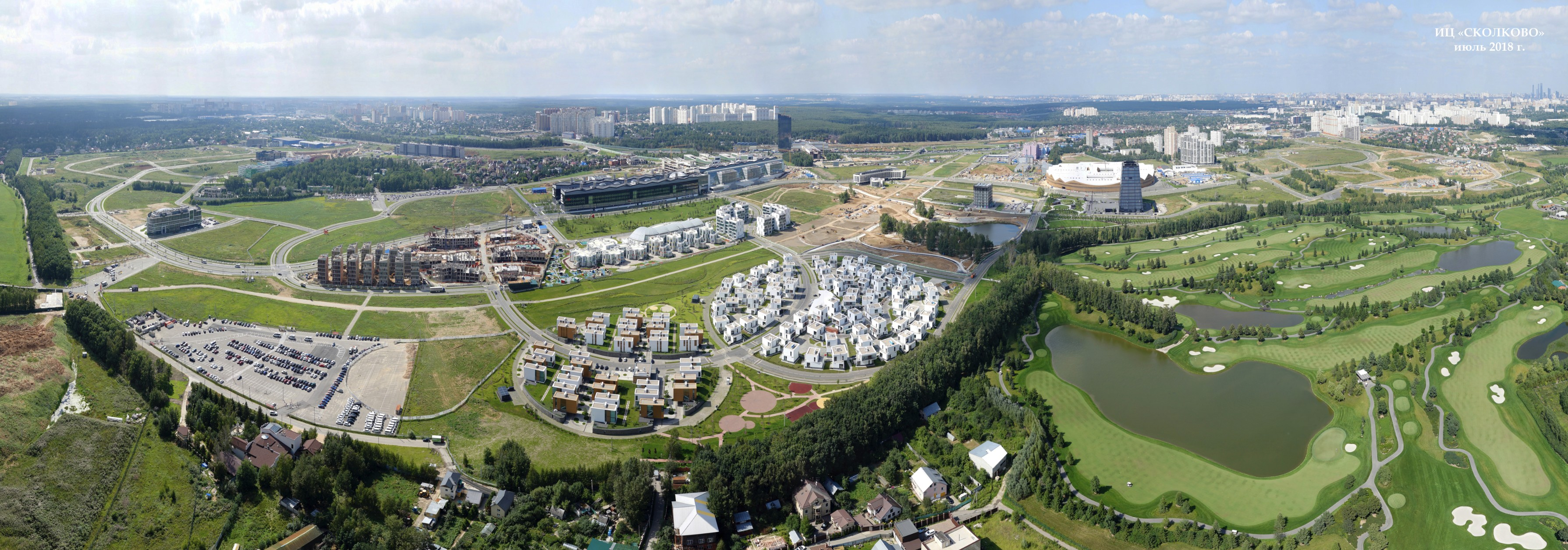
Skolkovo innovation center, July 2018

The Skolkovo Innovation Center is a high technology business area at Mozhaysky District in Moscow, Russia.

As corporations and individuals register their residency in the city, they can receive financial assistance to realize their proposed projects and ideas. Skolkovo was first announced on 12 November 2009 by then Russian President Dmitry Medvedev. The complex is headed by Viktor Vekselberg.

== History and work ==
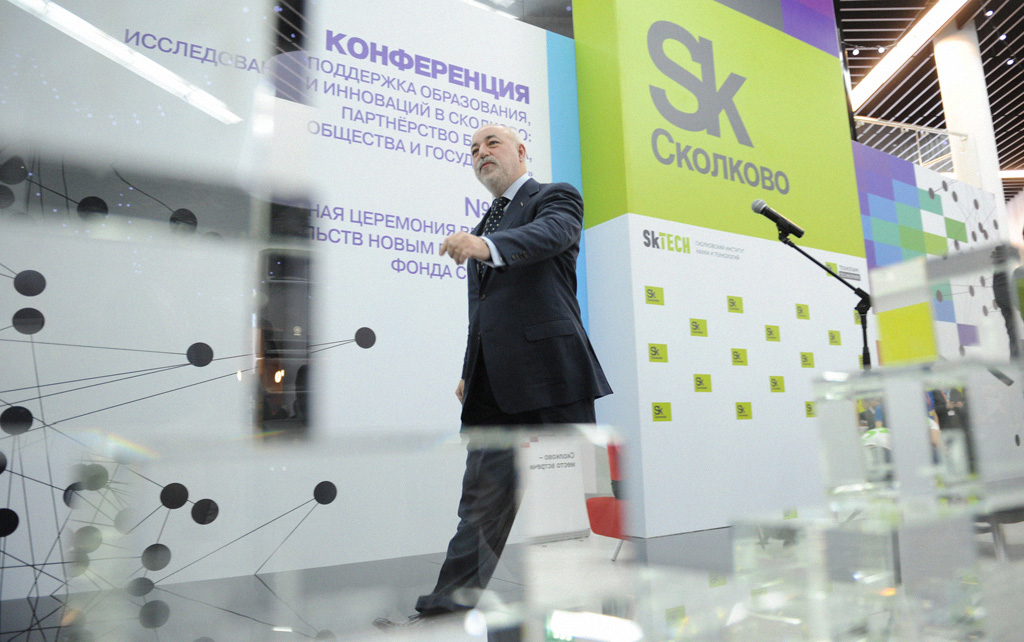
Viktor Vekselberg, head of the Skolkovo Institute of Science and Technology

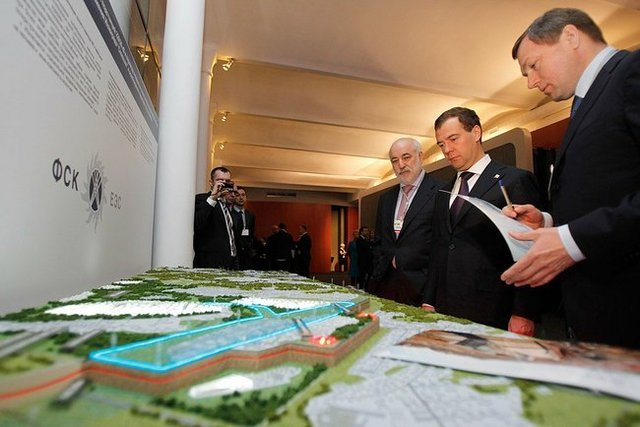
Dmitry Medvedev inspecting a miniature model for the project in 2012

In March 2010, Vekselberg announced the necessity of developing a special legal code for Skolkovo and emphasized the need to offer a tax holiday lasting 5–7 years. In April 2010, Russian President Dmitry Medvedev charged the government with working out legal, administrative, tax, and customs regulations for Skolkovo. In May 2010, Medvedev introduced two bills regulating working conditions in Skolkovo. The bills were adopted by the State Duma in September of that year and on 28 September 2010, Medvedev signed the bills into federal law. In August 2010, Medvedev introduced a bill easing migratory policies in regards to Skolkovo.

=== Visa policies for foreign nationals ===
On 20 August 2010, a new government decree regulating visas for participants of the Skolkovo project was published. According to this decree, specialized and highly skilled foreign nationals who arrive in Russia with the purpose of securing employment at Skolkovo will be granted a visa for a term of up to 30 days. In the event of successful job placement they can then obtain a work visa for a term of 3 years.

=== Transportation ===
A new highway was opened connecting Skolkovo to the MKAD in June 2010.

=== Financing ===
The innovation center was initially financed primarily from the Russian federal budget. However, over the years the amount of federal funding has decreased in relation to private sector funding. The center's 2010 budget was 3.9 Billion RUB. An additional 22 Billion RUB was planned for 2012 and 17.3 Billion RUB in 2013.

== Clusters ==
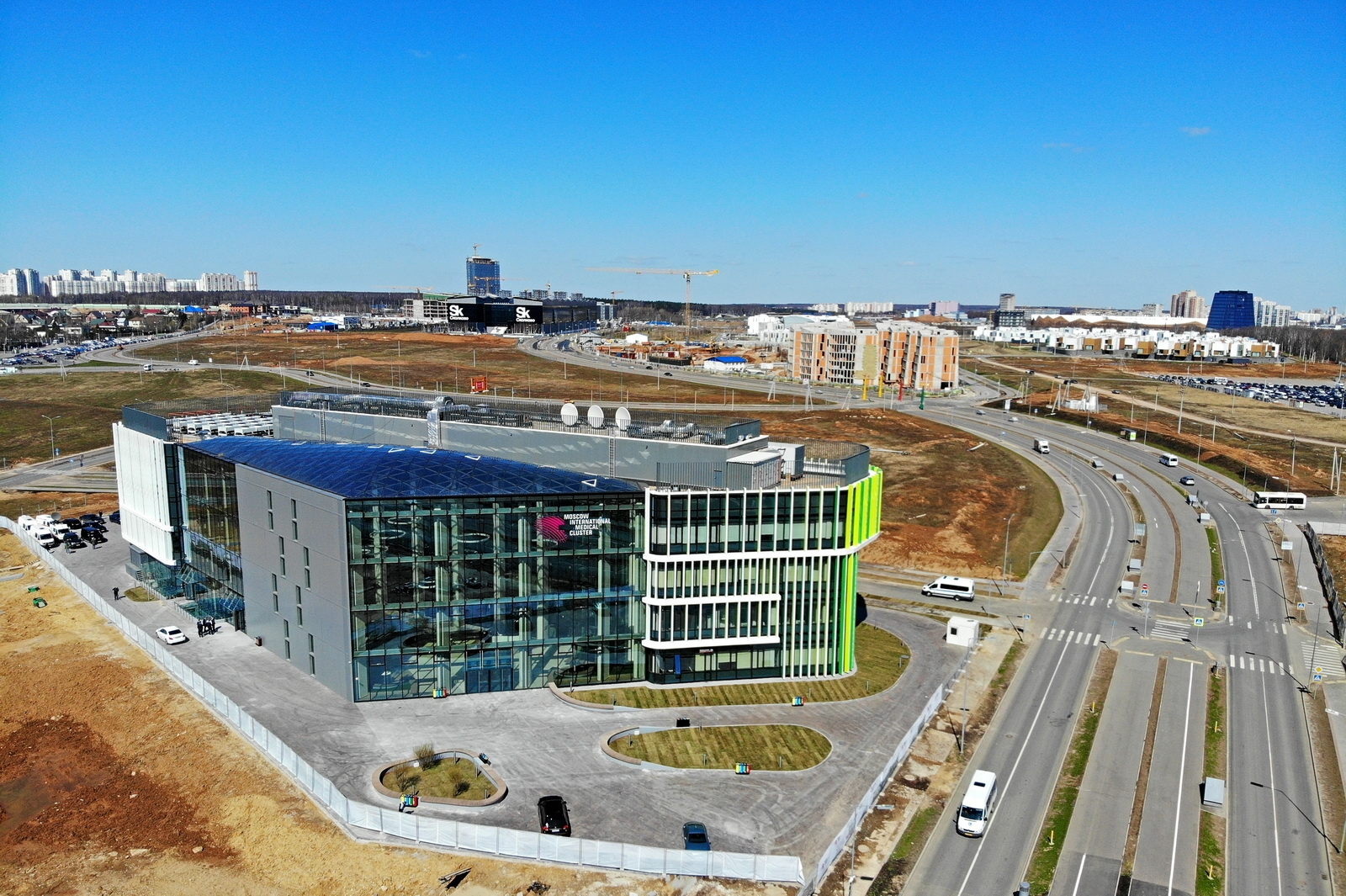
Moscow International Medical Cluster

Skolkovo includes five "clusters" specializing in different areas. These include IT, Energy, Nuclear Technologies, Biomedicine and Space Technologies.

=== Information technologies ===
The IT cluster is tasked with creating an effective model for successful commercialization of IT technologies in Russia. Over 450 companies have signed up for the IT cluster.

=== Energy-efficient technologies ===
The Energy Efficient Technologies cluster aims to introduce breakthrough technologies focused on the reduction of energy consumption by industrial, housing and municipal infrastructure facilities. Today over 80 companies are on board for the energy efficiency cluster.

=== Nuclear technologies ===
The Nuclear Technologies cluster aims to encourage the competitiveness of nuclear power markets and develop breakthrough technologies and products.

=== Biomedical technologies ===
The strategic goal of this cluster is to create an ecosystem for biomedical innovation. In order to achieve this goal, the best practices of leading biotechnology and biomedical research centers were studied. More than 215 companies signed on for the Biomedical Technologies cluster.

=== Space technologies and telecommunications ===
The Space Technology and Telecommunications cluster is intended to strengthen Russia's position in the respective industries. The scope of activity is wide: from space tourism to satellite navigation systems. Russian companies aim to increase their market share in this global market, the total volume of which is estimated at $300 billion.

=== Cooperation between clusters ===
There are examples of cooperation between the clusters. For example, in 2012 clusters of Information Technologies and Biomedical Technologies organized joint contest on Mobile Diagnostic Device "Skolkovo M.D." and FRUCT was named the contest winner.

== Skolkovo Softlanding Program ==
Skolkovo Softlanding Program is a special program for high-tech foreign companies willing to expand to the Russian market. It bridges the gap between startups from all around the world and the opportunities available to them in Russia. It helps innovators, small and medium-sized companies to find their success on the Russian market by connecting them to the Russian companies, investors, business angels, mentors, partners and professionals. The duration of the program is one week, it takes place three times a year (March, June, October). Starting from 2019 ten cohorts have been conducted, 234 companies from 55 countries have participated in the program. When the program is over foreign startups may apply for Skolkovo resident status on order to start receiving tax benefits. and get opportunity to apply for grants.

Daria Shunina, Head of the Skolkovo Softlanding Program says: "Our main mission is to help foreign companies to expand to the Russian market or at least to learn more about it".

== Innovation City ==
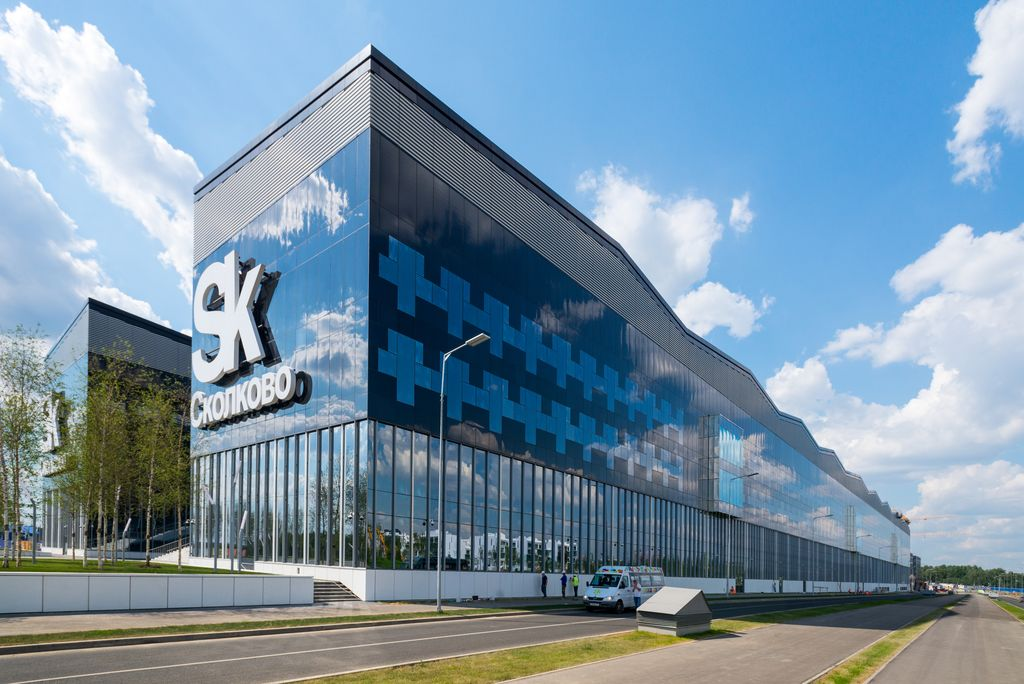
Technopark of Skolkovo.

The main elements of The city are the University and a Technopark. The city will also feature a Congress Center, office buildings, laboratories, fitness centers and stores. The city will measure roughly 400 hectares and have a permanent population of 21,000. Employees, including commuters from Moscow and surrounding regions, will comprise about 31,000 people.

=== Sustainable development ===
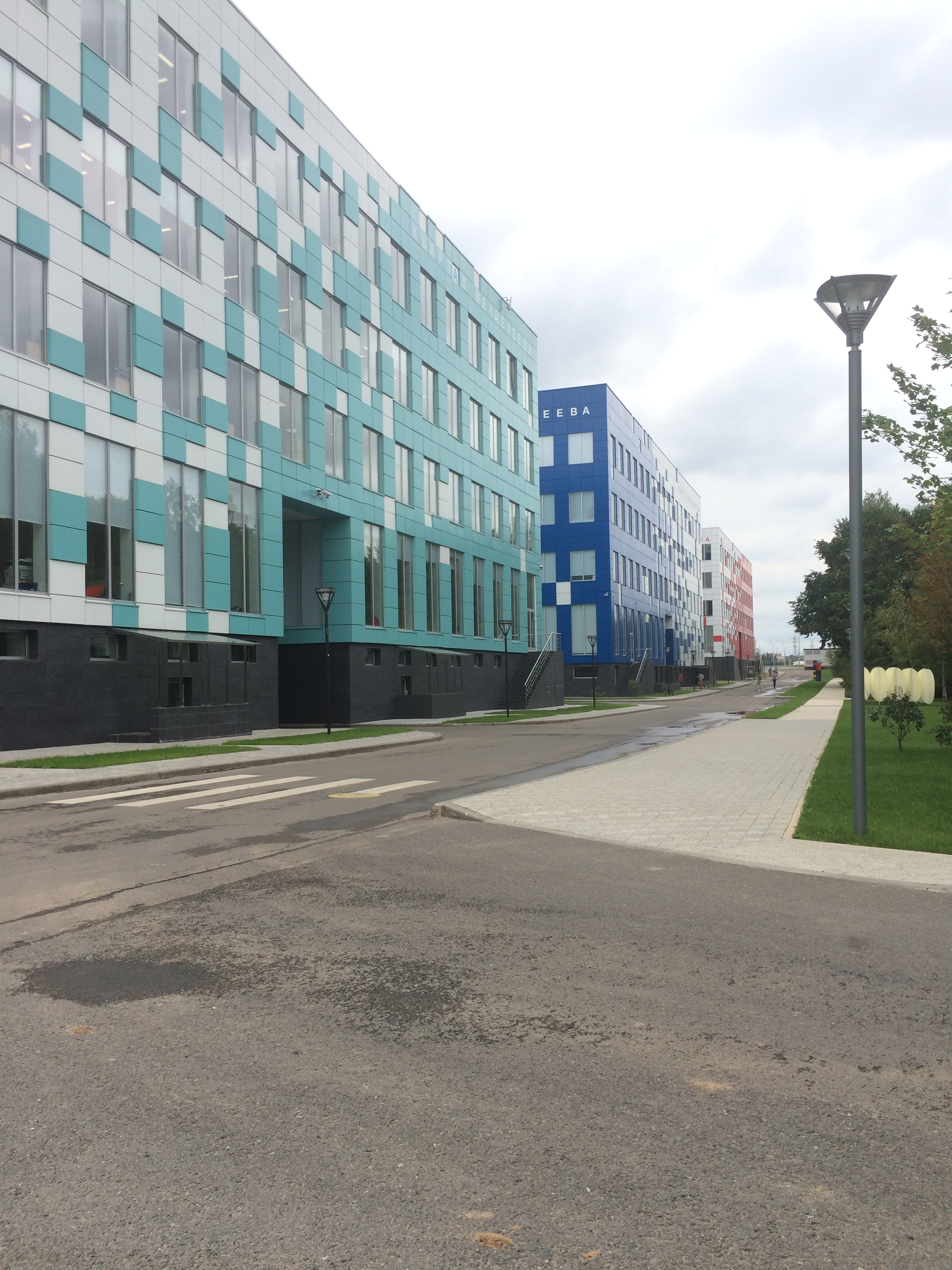
Mendeleev Quarter in the Skolkovo Innovation Center, August 2016

At least 50% of the energy consumed by the city come from renewable sources, according to the initial plans. The well-developed water system uses significantly less water by Russian standards without compromising comfort or hygiene. The transport system prioritizes walking and cycling. The use of vehicles with internal combustion engines is prohibited in the city. Energy passive and active buildings that do not require energy from the outside and even produce more energy than they consume will be built at Skolkovo. Household and municipal waste will be disposed of in the most environmentally friendly way possible – leveraging the use of plasma incinerator technology.

== Electronics Technology Center (ETC) ==
In July 2012, IBM and five Russian innovation companies: the Skolkovo Foundation, Rusnano, Rostelecom, Russian Venture Company and ITFY, signed a collaboration agreement to foster a culture of applied research and commercialization and attract key talent and investment from around the world in the area of microelectronics.

The agreement will give the Electronics Technology Center access to IBM's intellectual property for chip design.

The cloud will help unite Russia's dispersed microelectronics development teams and provide access to advanced technologies and best practice and foster global collaboration.

The agreement was signed by Victor Vekselberg, President of the Skolkovo Foundation; Anatoly Chubais, CEO and Chairman of the Executive Board of Rosnano; Alexander Provotorov, President and Chairman of the Management Board of Rostelecom; Igor Agamirzian, CEO of Russian Venture Company; Evgeny Babayan, Chairman of the Board, ITFY; Leonid Svatkov, CEO ITFY; Bruno Di Leo, Senior Vice President IBM; and Kirill Korniliev, Country General Manager, IBM Russia & CIS.

The ETC will initially focus on microelectronics design; however in the future it may be extended to other fields where cloud computing can support collaborative development projects.

== Open University Skolkovo (OpUS) ==
Skolkovo's Open University (OpUS) isn't an educational institution in the typical sense of the word, because graduating students don't receive a diploma. Instead, OpUS is a source of prospective Masters and PhD candidates, for the Skolkovo Institute of Science and Technology (SkolTech), and interns for Skolkovo partner companies. The educational plan of OpUS includes lecture series, master classes and courses by leading scientists, thinkers and practitioners. Students acquire knowledge in the priority research and development areas of Skolkovo (information technology, biomedicine, energetics, space and nuclear technology). In addition, they have an opportunity to gain knowledge in academic and innovative competencies (foresight, forecasting, thinking, projecting), entrepreneur competence, experience in teamwork on projecting and solving inter-disciplinary problems.

OpUS was opened on 21 April 2011 in Moscow. There are currently more than 250 students enrolled in OpUS.

== Architecture ==
The Skolkovo Innovation Center features several innovative buildings, particularly the Hypercube and Matrex by Bernaskoni, and the East Ring by Herzog & de Meuron.

== International collaboration ==
International partners include:

- (Finland) Nokia Solutions and Networks
- (Germany) Siemens, SAP
- (United States) Microsoft, Boeing, Intel, Cisco, Dow Chemical, EMC Corporation, IBM, Johnson & Johnson
- (Sweden) Ericsson
- (France) Alstom, Airbus
- In 2011 Israel's Ariel University Center, jointly with Martal Consulting Group, signed a cooperation agreement with the Skolkovo Innovation Center known as "Silicon Valley" in Russia. Following this agreement, an Israel-Skolkovo Gateway/Center (IsraelSK) was formed. IsraelSK model for innovative technologies commercialization involves raising private capital and government grants leveraging for Israeli and Russian start-up companies. Israel SK project was terminated in 2014. In 2016, Igor Drozdev, chairman of the board of the Skolkovo Foundation, signed a cooperation agreement with the Mayor of Yokneam. Beginning in 2018, Israel's Hadassah Medical Center, in agreement with the Mayor of Moscow, is opening a branch in Skolkovo, becoming the first foreign hospital to open in Russia.

== Published data and performance ==
The Skolkovo Center publishes annual reports about the project, showing some data from their own sources.

Skolkovo Human capital

- Professors
- Postdocs and researchers
- Technical personnel

Revenues earned by Skolkovo participants (billion ₽)

- Revenues earned by participants with resident status
- Revenues earned by participants without resident status

Raised investments (billion ₽)

- Investment in physical infrastructure
- Investment in technology startups

International Patents (pcs)

Sources by Skolkovo

== See also ==
- Russian page wikipedia page
- Innopolis
- National Technological Initiative
- Business cluster

Silicon Valley type locations in the former Soviet Union

- Silicon Taiga - Akademgorodok - Soviet/Russian research and development project of similar scale
- Titanium Valley (Sverdlovsk Oblast)
- Zelenograd - Soviet/Russian electronics and microelectronics center

Silicon Valley type locations around the world.

- California Silicon Valley
- Dublin Silicon Docks
- Paris-Saclay
- East London Tech City
- Silicon Wadi - Israel
- Cyberjaya - science park in Malaysia
- Hi-Tech Park Belarus High Technologies Park - science park in Belarus
- UNIT.City - innovation park in Ukraine.
- Zhongguancun, China's Silicon Valley
