= Hadassah Medical Center =

Coordinates: 31°47′50″N 35°14′31″E

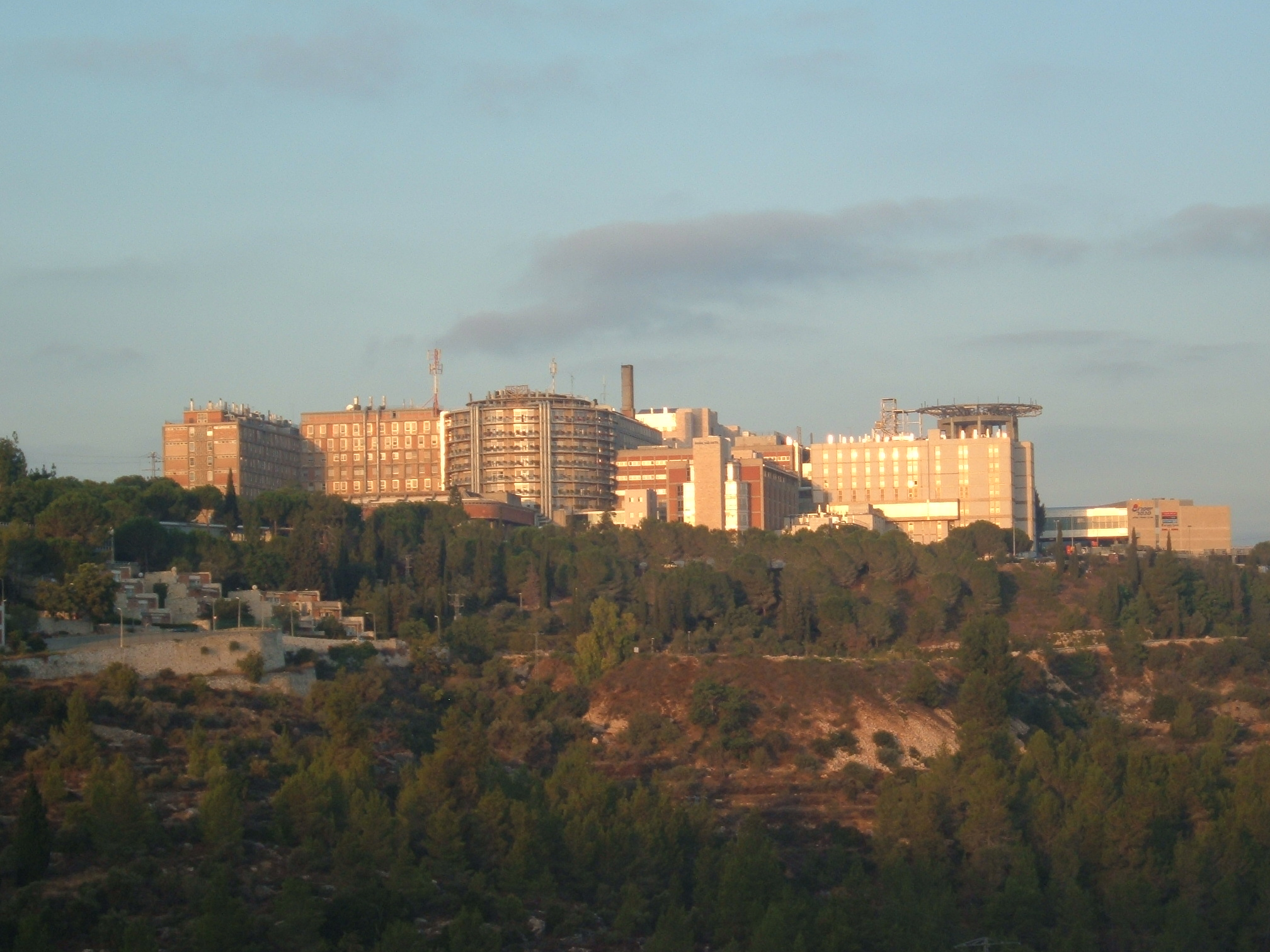
- Hadassah in Ein Karem, Jerusalem, the second campus of the Hadassah Medical Center

Geography
- Location: Ein Karem, Jerusalem

Organisation
- Care system: Private
- Type: Teaching, District General
- Affiliated university: Hebrew University of Jerusalem
- Patron: Hadassah Women's Zionist Organization of America

Services
- Emergency department: Yes
- Beds: 1,044

History
- Founded: 1934

Links
- Website: www.hadassah.org.il

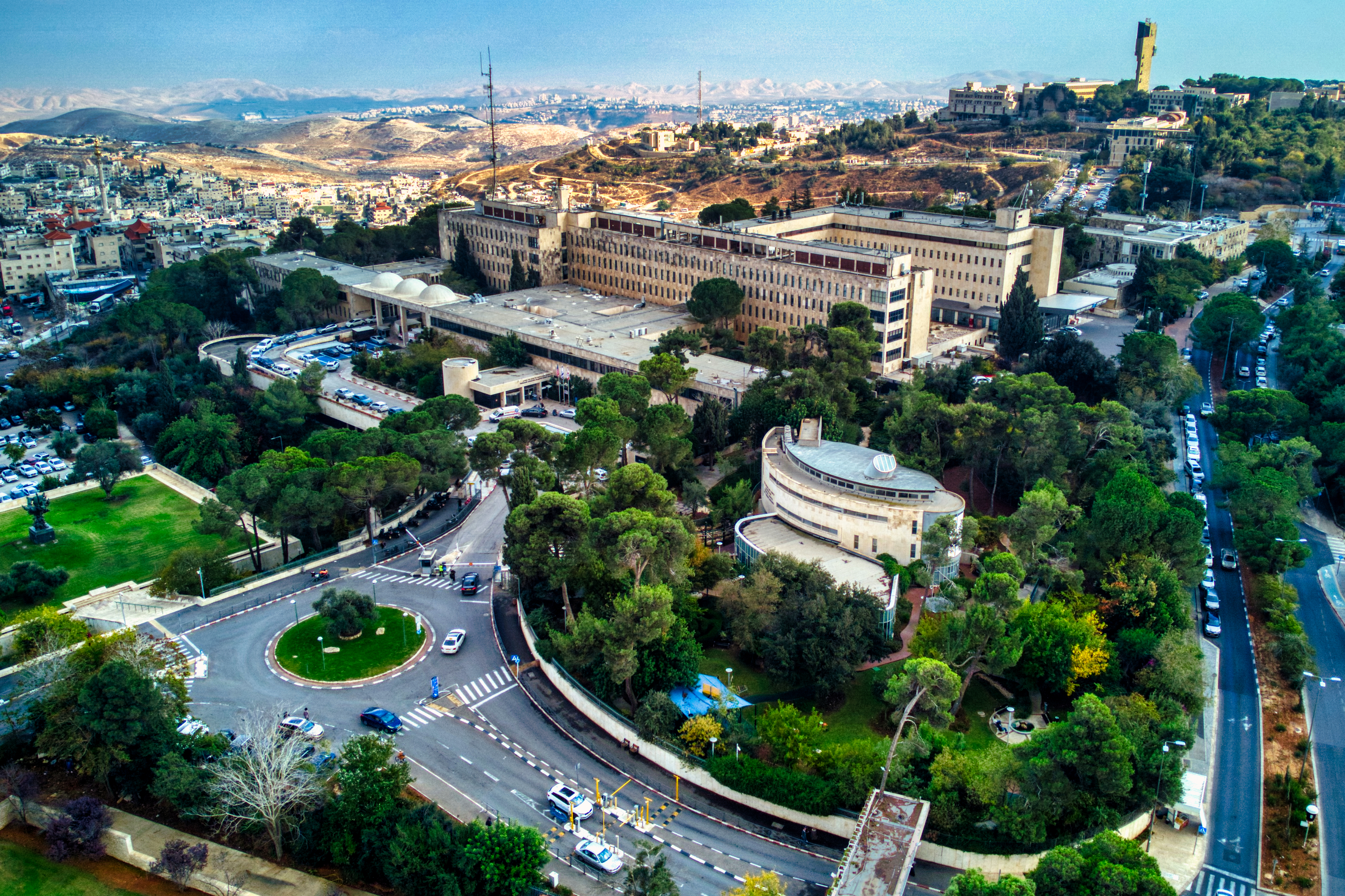
Hadassah University Hospital, Mt. Scopus, Jerusalem

Hadassah Medical Center (Hebrew: הָמֶרְכָּז הָרְפוּאִי הֲדַסָּה) is an Israeli medical organization established in 1934 that operates two university hospitals in Jerusalem (one in Ein Karem and one in Mount Scopus) as well as schools of medicine, dentistry, nursing, and pharmacology affiliated with the Hebrew University of Jerusalem. Its mission is to extend a "hand to all, without regard for race, religion or ethnic origin."

The hospital was founded by the Hadassah Women's Zionist Organization of America, which continues to underwrite a large part of its budget today. The Medical Center ranks as the sixth-largest hospital complex in Israel. Across its two campuses, Hadassah Medical Center has over 1,300 beds, 31 operating theaters and nine special intensive care units, and runs five schools of medical professions.

In 2025, Newsweek ranked the Ein Karem hospital as the 4th best hospital in Israel and the 242nd best in the world.

== History ==
=== Late Ottoman period (1912–1915) ===
The Hadassah organization was established in 1912 in New York City to provide health care in Ottoman-ruled Jerusalem. In 1913, Hadassah sent two nurses to the Ottoman South Syrian Eyalet. They set up a small public health station in Jerusalem to provide maternity care and treat trachoma, a dreaded eye disease rampant in the Middle East. During the First World War the Ottoman authorities suspected Jews had sympathies with the enemy and in 1915 the Hadassah Nurses station had to close down due to Ottoman pressure.

=== Activities throughout Mandate Palestine (1918–1948) ===
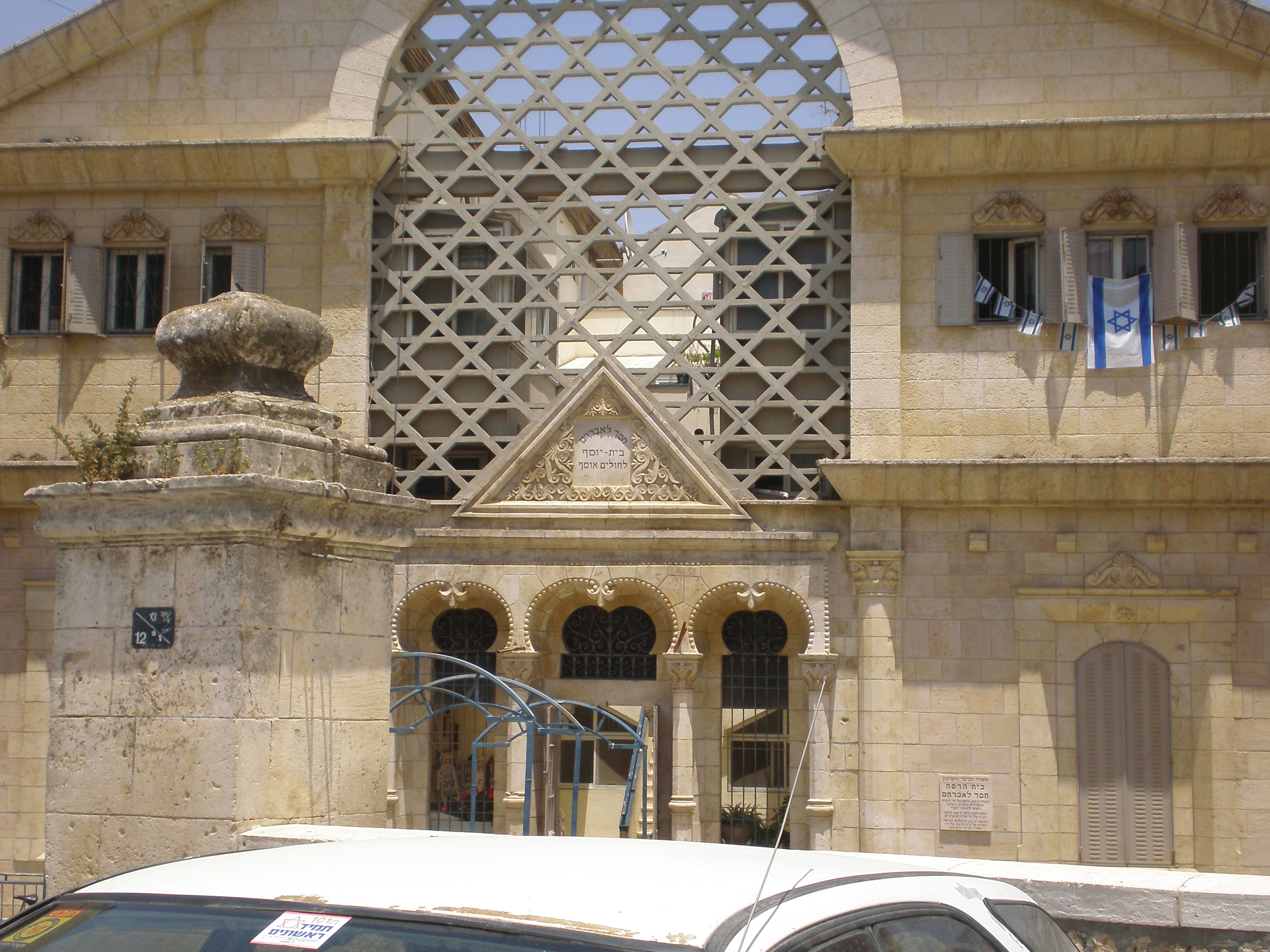
The Beit Hadassah building in Hebron dates back to 1893 and was one of the first Hadassah clinics in the country.

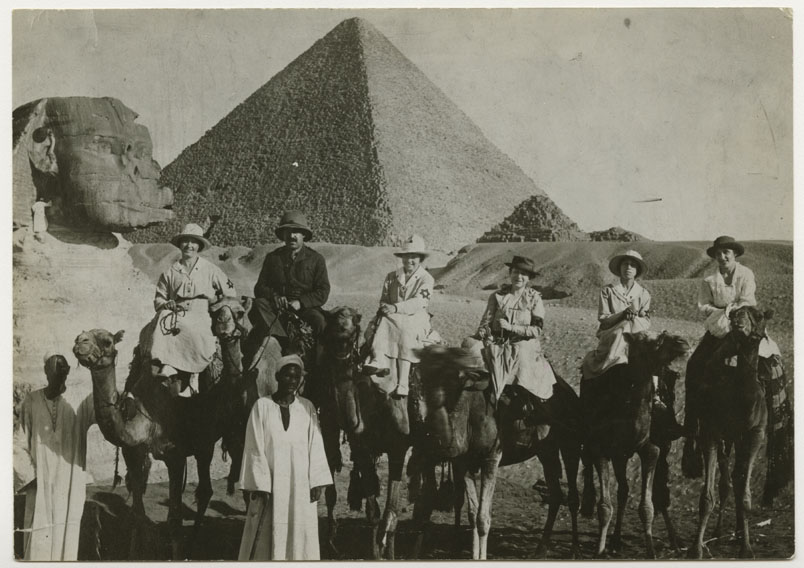
Nurses and physicians from the American Zionist Medical Unit on camels in Egypt en route to Palestine in July 1918

In 1918, Hadassah established the American Zionist Medical Unit (AZMU), staffed by 45 medical health professionals. The AZMU helped to establish six hospitals in British Mandatory Palestine which were then turned over to municipal authorities. The Meir Rothschild Hospital opened in Jerusalem in 1918. That year, Hadassah also founded a nursing school to train local personnel and create a cadre of nurses.

In 1919, Hadassah organized the first School Hygiene Department in British Mandatory Palestine to give routine health examinations to Jerusalem school children. During the Arab riots of 1920, Hadassah nurses cared for the wounded on both sides. Henrietta Szold moved to Jerusalem that year to develop community health and preventive care programs.

In 1921, a Hadassah nurse, Bertha Landsman, set up the first Tipat Halav perinatal care center in Jerusalem, providing care for babies and their mothers and providing pasteurized milk for those who needed. That same year, Hadassah opened a hospital in Tel Aviv. The following year, it established a hospital in Haifa. In 1926, Hadassah established the first tuberculosis treatment center in Safed. In 1929, Hadassah opened the Nathan and Lina Straus Health Center in Jerusalem. In the 1930s, planning began for a new hospital to replace the Rothschild hospital founded in 1888 on Street of the Prophets, Jerusalem. Rose Halprin, Hadassah's sixth national president, moved to Jerusalem to serve as liaison between the American office and Hadassah in British Mandatory Palestine. The Rothschild-Hadassah University Hospital, the first teaching hospital and medical center in British Mandatory Palestine, opened on May 9, 1939.

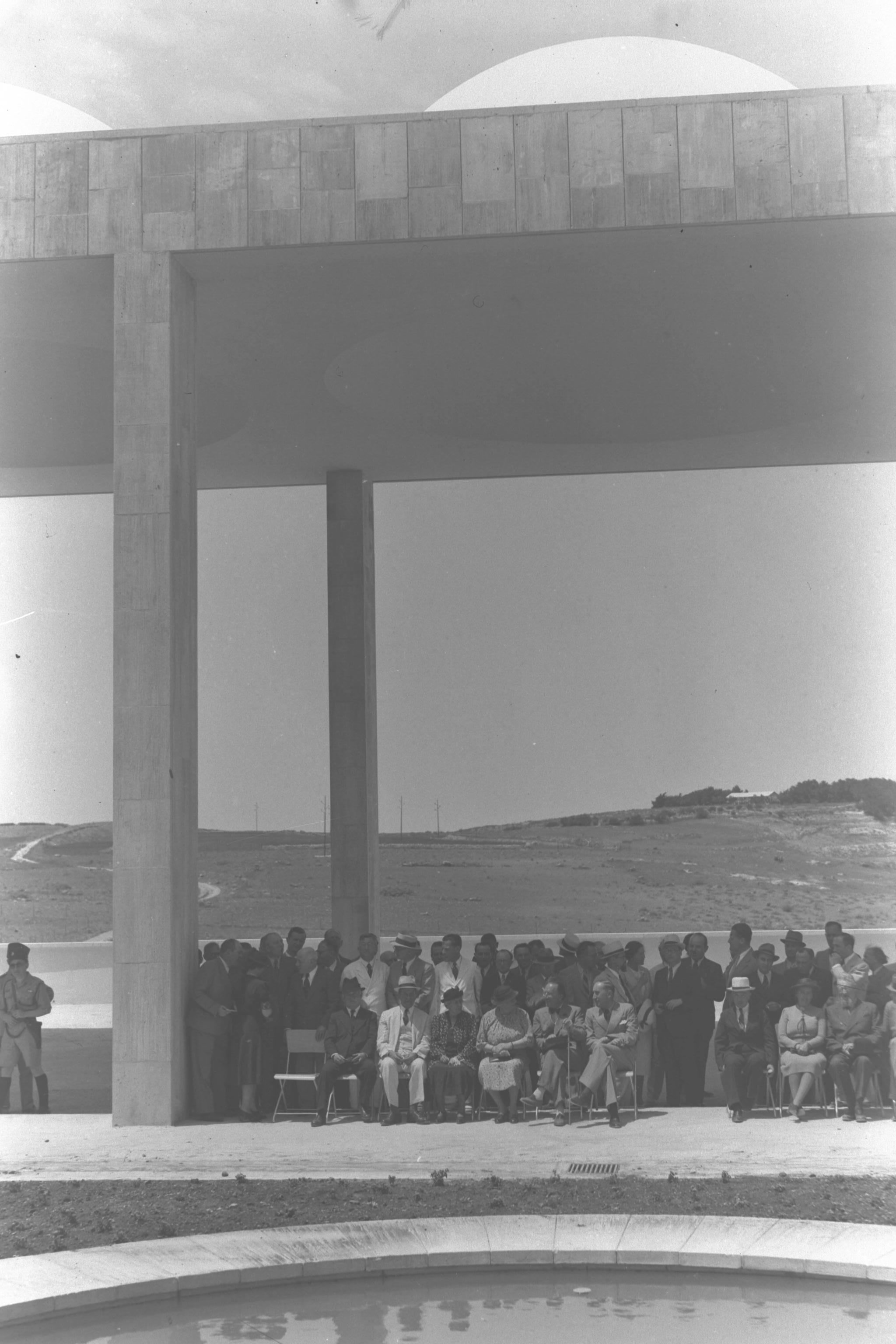
1939 opening ceremony on Mount Scopus

The Hadassah Medical Organization operated an infirmary in Hebron. The Beit Hadassah clinic had three floors with the infirmary, the pharmacy and the synagogue on the top floor. Free care was provided to Jews and Arabs. The building dates back to 1893 and was originally called the Chesed L'Avraham clinic. In 1929 it was the site of some of the worst of the Hebron massacre.

The British Royal Commission, known as the Peel Commission, praised the work of Hadassah in its 1937 report:

The Hadassah Medical Organization has developed a widespread system of clinics in Jewish centres and hospitals in the principal towns...Though naturally the Jewish population benefited most, the Hadassah medical services were available to all the communities in Palestine and many of the poorer classes amongst the Arabs received much assistance from the work of the organization. This disinterested philanthropy of Hadassah deserves recognition: it was a real step towards the promotion of good feeling between the two races; but unhappily the effect of its work was impaired by other influences.

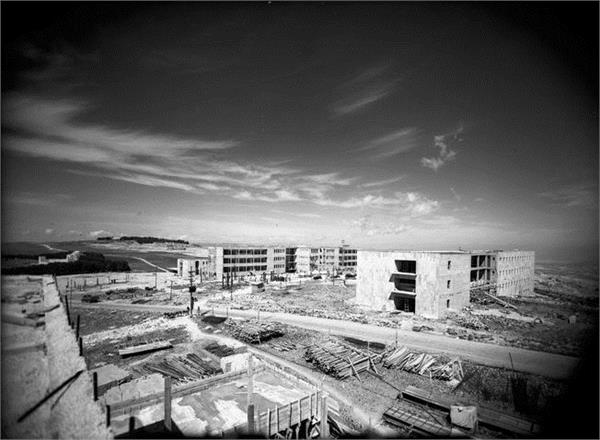
Hadassah buildings on Mount Scopus under construction, 1938

The Hadassah Hospital on Mount Scopus opened in 1939 and had to be closed down in 1948.

=== 1948–1967 ===
As a result of the 1948 war, Mount Scopus with the Hadassah Hospital were left as an Israeli exclave, guarded by a small number of Israeli armed personnel, and all the activities at the medical campus had to be abandoned. An alternative set of locations in West Jerusalem were adopted by the evacuated medical staff for continuing their activity. In 1961 a new medical complex was built in Ein Karem on the outskirts of Jerusalem.

=== After 1967 ===
During the Six-Day War, Israel conquered the entire area around Mount Scopus and the old medical campus was eventually reactivated. Both campuses are currently active, with the Ein Karem facilities being by far the larger and more important of the two.

=== Since 2005 ===
In 2005, Hadassah was nominated for the Nobel Peace Prize in acknowledgment of its equal treatment of all patients, regardless of ethnic and religious differences, and efforts to build bridges to peace.

French baritone David Serero has performed several concerts at the hospital in 2011, 2012 and 2013 for Israeli and Palestinian children. He is the young president of the organization in France.

Due to an accumulated deficit of over 1 billion NIS, at the request of the medical center's management, the Israeli courts declared 3 months of suspension of proceedings of insolvency, with a hold on action by creditors starting February 2014.

Beginning in 2018, the Hadassah Medical Center, in agreement with the Mayor of Moscow, is opening a branch in Skolkovo. The Hadassah project was estimated at $40.2 million, of which about $26.4 million will go to equip the center with equipment. In addition, $3.2 million will be spent on educational activities. It is planned that 10% of the income generated by Israel's Hadassah medical center in Skolkovo will be directed to research activities in the field of oncology.

On July 11, 2021, Ze'ev Rotstein, who served as Hadassah Medical Center CEO since 2015, tendered his resignation prior to facing possible disciplinary action by the board of directors. He was replaced by Professor Yoram G. Weiss.

In late 2022, Dr. Ahmad Mahajna, an Israeli cardiologist of Arab descent, found himself suspended from Hadassah Medical Center following allegations that he had provided food to a supposed terrorist and referred to him as a "martyr". However, by January 2023, Dr. Mahajna was reinstated following a mediation process that cleared him of the accusations.

== Mount Scopus campus ==
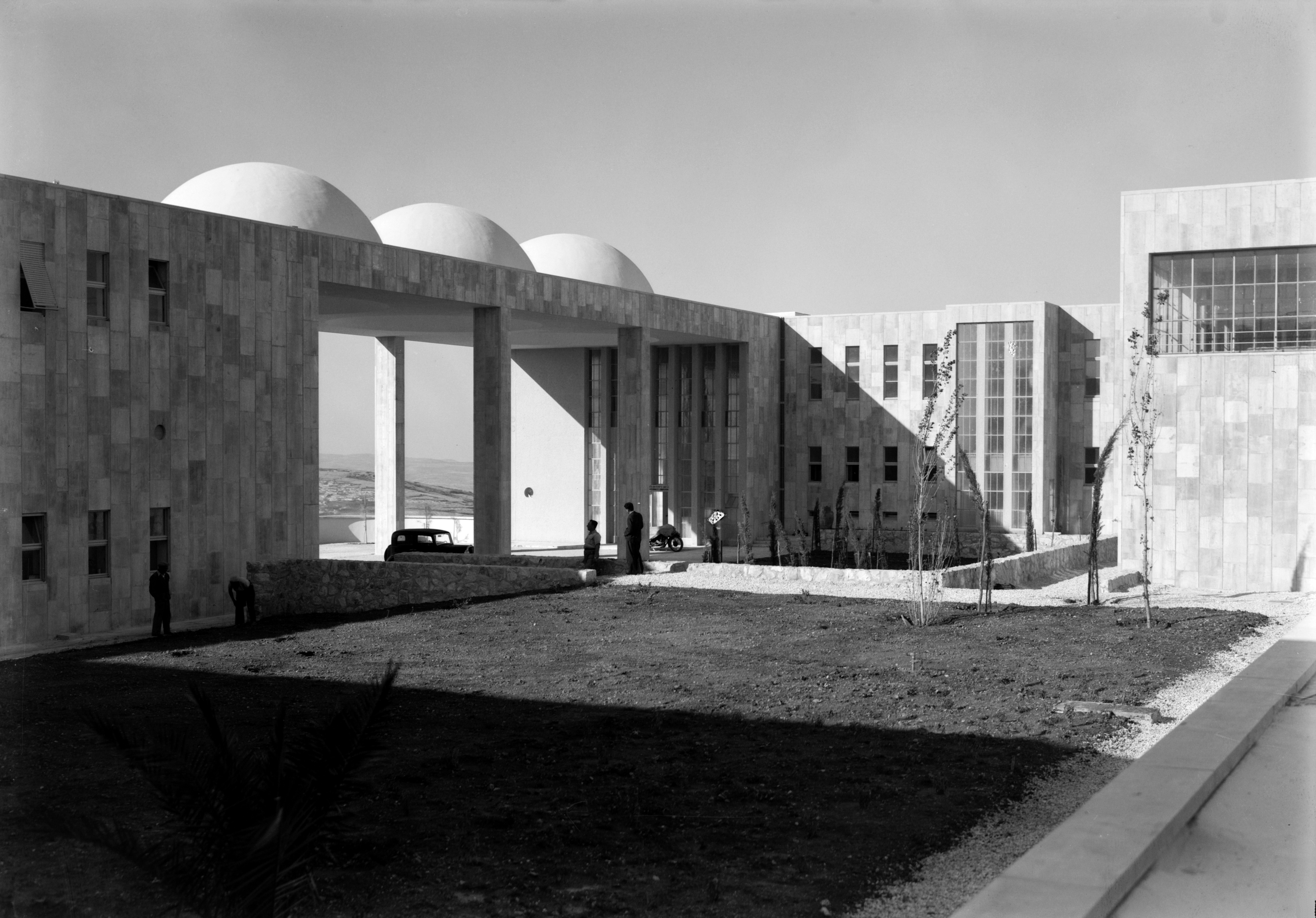
Photo of the Mount Scopus campus from the 1930s showing the courtyard and domes

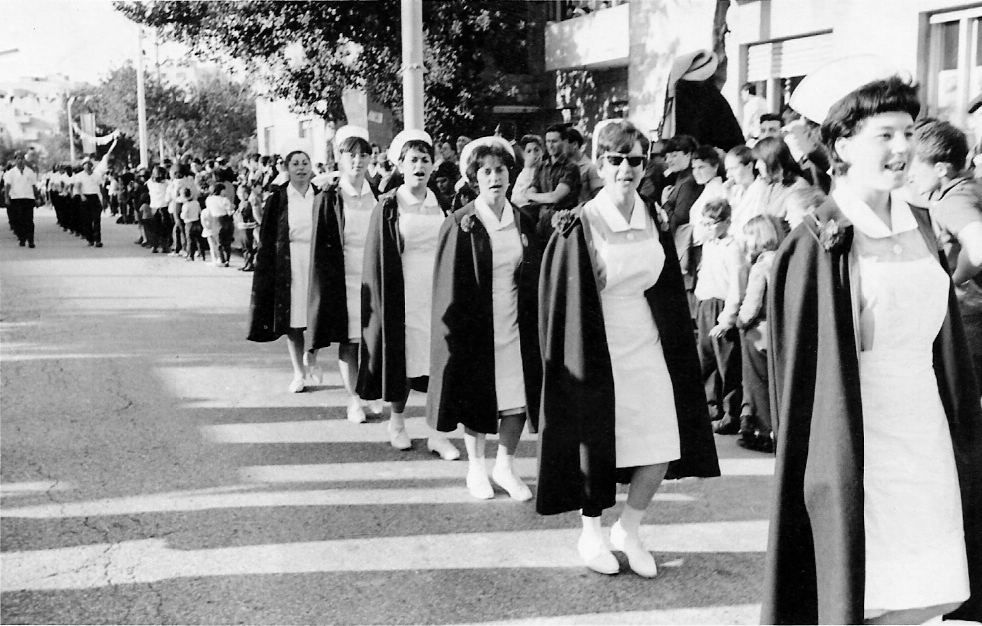
Hadassah nurses parade in Jerusalem, 1965

The cornerstone for the Hadassah hospital on Mount Scopus was laid in 1934. After five years of construction, the complex, designed by architect Erich Mendelsohn, opened its doors in 1939.

In March 1947, the leader of the Arab Forces in Jerusalem, Abd al-Qadir al-Husayni, threatened to blow up the hospital. He did not do so, but attacks were carried out on traffic to and from the hospital. On April 13, 1948, an armoured convoy of doctors, nurses, medical students, and other staff made its way to the hospital. The group was ambushed, and 78 people were killed in what became known as the Hadassah medical convoy massacre.

Under the 1949 armistice agreement with Jordan, Mount Scopus was declared a demilitarized enclave and operation of the hospital became impossible. The staff moved to temporary quarters in Jerusalem and eventually a new campus was built in Ein Karem.

Following the Six-Day War, Hadassah Mount Scopus underwent extensive renovations, reopening in 1975. With over 300 beds and 30 departments and clinics, including a rehabilitation building and a hospice, the hospital serves all populations in Jerusalem without distinction. Over one-third of the patients are Arab. In 2011, the Israeli-American actress Natalie Portman, who was born at Hadassah Mount Scopus, starred in a fundraising campaign for the hospital. Hadassah Mount-Scopus is currently headed by Prof. Avi Israeli, with a staff of 1,200 employs.

In 2024, the Gandel Rehabilitation Center was opened in the Mount Scopus campus, offering 140 inpatient beds.

== Ein Karem campus ==
From 1948 to 1962, Hadassah hospital operated in rented quarters in five different locations in Jerusalem, including what is now the Anglican International School on Street of the Prophets in Jerusalem. In 1961, a new medical complex was built in Ein Karem in southwest Jerusalem under the direction of then-director general Kalman Mann. The Hadassah Women's Zionist Organization of America again assisted with funding, and the somewhat out-of-the-way location was chosen in part because an appropriate site was difficult to obtain in the city-center, and the Israeli government offered Hadassah owned a plot in Ein Karem to build a new hospital. The hospital was designed by Joseph Neufeld, a pioneer of International Style architecture in Israel.

Prior to the opening of a 19-story hospital tower in 2012, Hadassah Ein Karem had 700 inpatient beds. The hospital complex consists of 22 buildings, including the Hebrew University of Jerusalem schools of medicine, dentistry, nursing, public health and pharmacology.

Since February 27, 2025, the Red Line of the Jerusalem Light Rail serves the campus with two stations : one for the Medical School, another for the main entrance of the hospital.

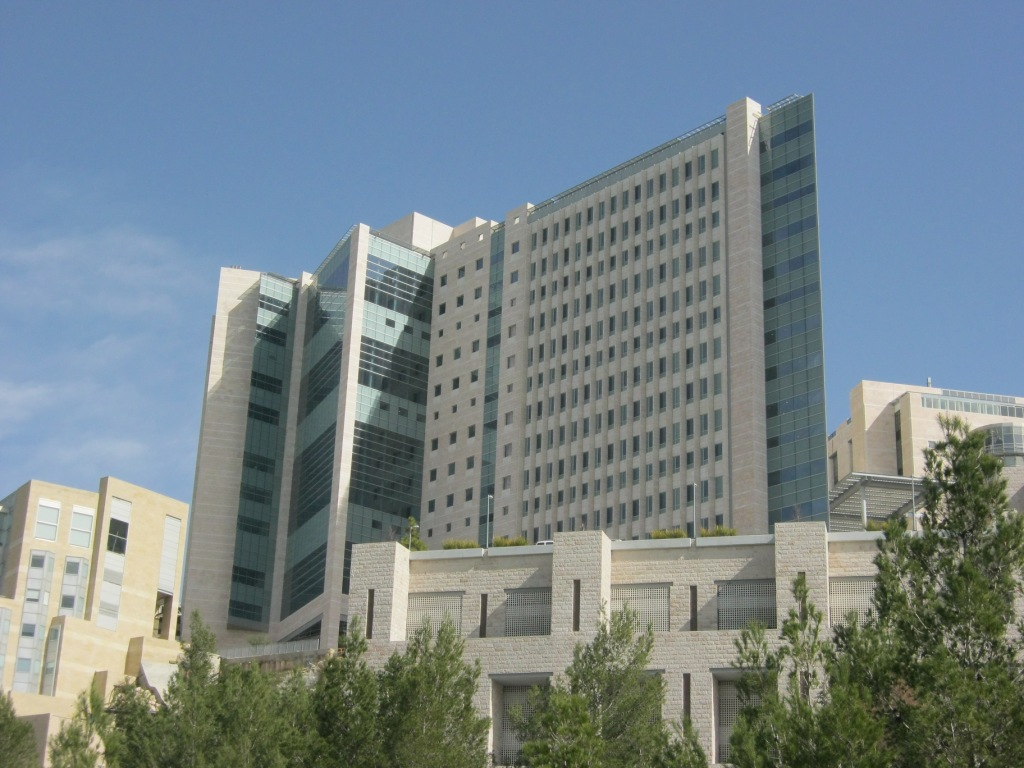
Davidson Tower, 2012

Hadassah's director is Professor Yoram G. Weiss. Notable physicians include Avraham Rivkind, founder and director of the hospital's trauma center, Ahmed Eid, head of the liver and kidney transplant unit, and Arie Eldad, head of the department of plastic surgery and burns unit.

In March 2007, Jewish American billionaire William Davidson donated $75 million to the hospital. In 2012, the Sarah Wetsman Davidson Hospital Tower opened with 500 beds and 20 operating theaters.

In 2008 Prime Minister John Key of New Zealand made a donation to the hospital.

In April 2009, following an initiative of the Puah Institute, the hospital opened a fertility clinic for AIDS patients, the first such clinic in Israel. Prof. Shlomo Ma'ayan heads the clinic.

=== Chagall windows ===
One of the synagogues in the Ein Karem campus is illuminated by stained glass windows depicting the twelve tribes of Israel, created by Marc Chagall. Chagall envisaged the synagogue as "a crown offered to the Jewish Queen," and the windows as "jewels of translucent fire." The windows were installed February 1962. At the dedication ceremony, Chagall said: "A stained glass window is a transparent partition between my heart and the heart of the world...To read the Bible is to perceive a certain light, and the window has to make this obvious through its simplicity and grace... The thoughts have nested in me for many years, since the time when my feet walked on the Holy Land, when I prepared myself to create engravings of the Bible. They strengthened me and encouraged me to bring my modest gift to the Jewish people, that people that lived here thousands of years ago."

=== New entrance pavilion ===
In 2012, a new glassed-in entrance pavilion opened at the foot of the Davidson Tower which funnels all traffic entering the hospital. Alongside the building are four "healing gardens" planned by Shlomo Aronson employing the principles of biophilic design, which posits that nature and vegetation impact positively on human health.

=== Bio-park ===
Below the medical center is the Jerusalem Bio Park (JBP), home to several biotechnology companies, including Hadasit the technology transfer company of Hadassah Medical Center.

== Research and Development ==
In 2014, the Research Fund of the Hadassah Medical Organization (RFHMO) was established as the executive arm of Hadassah's Division of Research, Development & Innovation, under the leadership of Prof. Eyal Mishani. RFHMO has over 300 research staff and a multi-million-dollar annual funding, producing around 900 peer-reviewed publications each year.

For the 2024–2025 period, Hadassah Medical Organization has been named Israel's top hospital for scientific output, according to Nature Index, and among the top 200 hospitals worldwide.

== Notable alumni ==
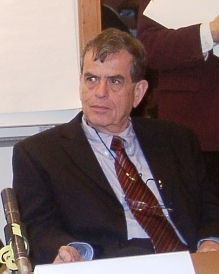
Aaron Ciechanover, Nobel Prize winner

- Arie S. Belldegrun (born 1949), director of the UCLA Institute of Urologic Oncology and is Professor and Chief of Urologic Oncology at the David Geffen School of Medicine
- Rivka Carmi (born 1948), pediatrician, geneticist, President of Ben-Gurion University of the Negev
- Aaron Ciechanover (born 1947), biologist and Nobel laureate in Chemistry
- Yehuda Danon (born 1940), doctor, Surgeon General of the Israel Defense Forces, Director General of Beilinson Medical Center, and President of Ariel University
- Raul Geller (born 1936), Peruvian-Israeli footballer and orthopedic surgeon
- Avram Hershko (born 1937), Hungarian-born Israeli biochemist and Nobel laureate in Chemistry
- Emanuel Margoliash (1920–2008), biochemist
- Avraham Steinberg (born 1947) Professor of Medical Ethics, Director of Hadassah Medical Ethics Center, and Pediatric Neurologist

== Notable patients ==
- Saeb Erekat (COVID-19 treatment)
- Benjamin Netanyahu (prostate surgery)
- Natalie Portman (birth)

== Branches ==
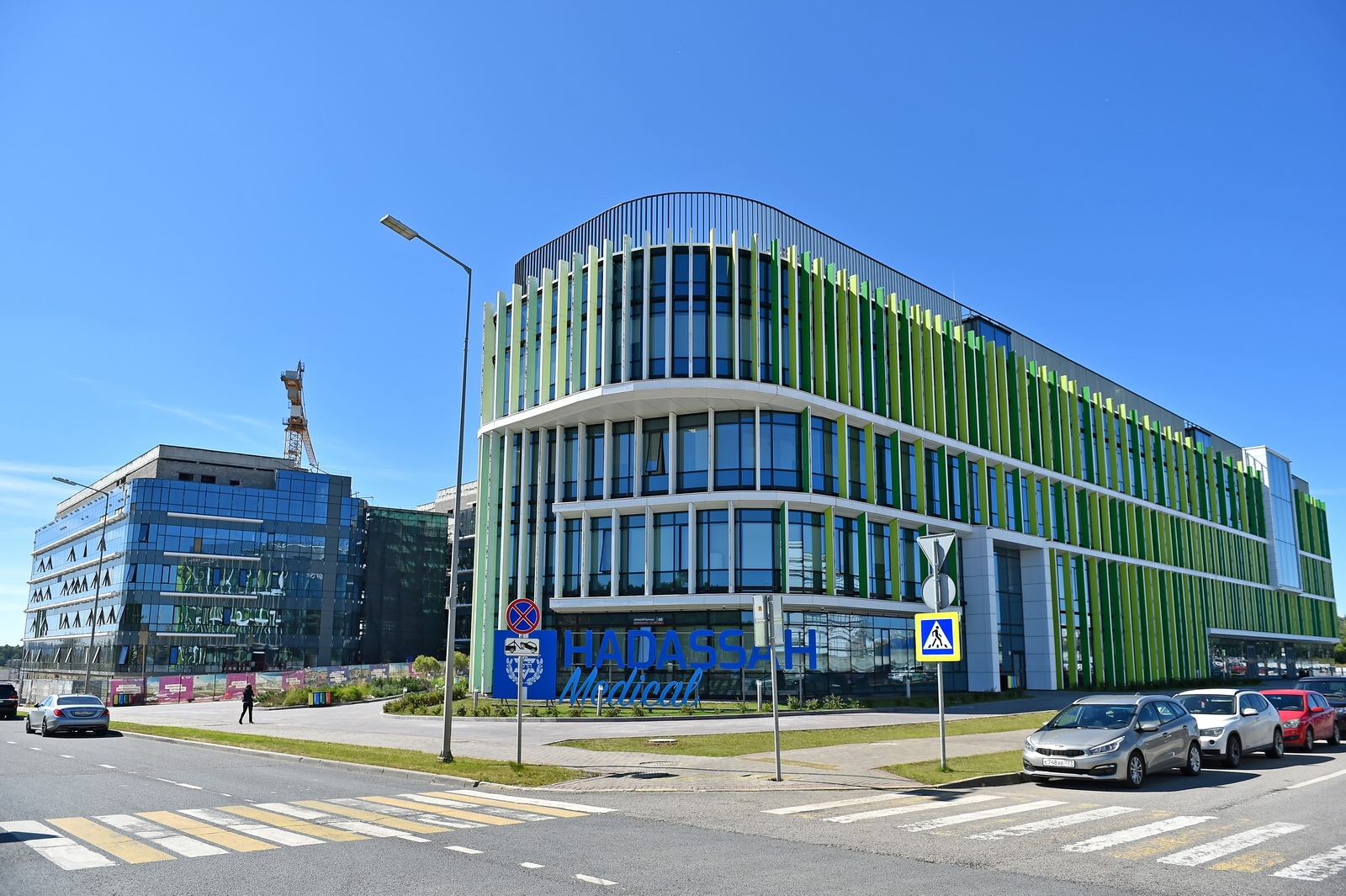
Hadassah Medical Center in Skolkovo, Moscow

== See also ==
- Health care in Israel
- Medical tourism in Israel
- List of hospitals in Israel
- Hadassah, the Women's Zionist Organization of America
