= Tresch =

Tresch is a surname. Notable people with the surname include:

- J. B. Tresch (1773–1821), Luxembourgian composer
- Walter Tresch (born 1948), Swiss alpine skier
