= Hail Mary =

Prayer of the Catholic Church

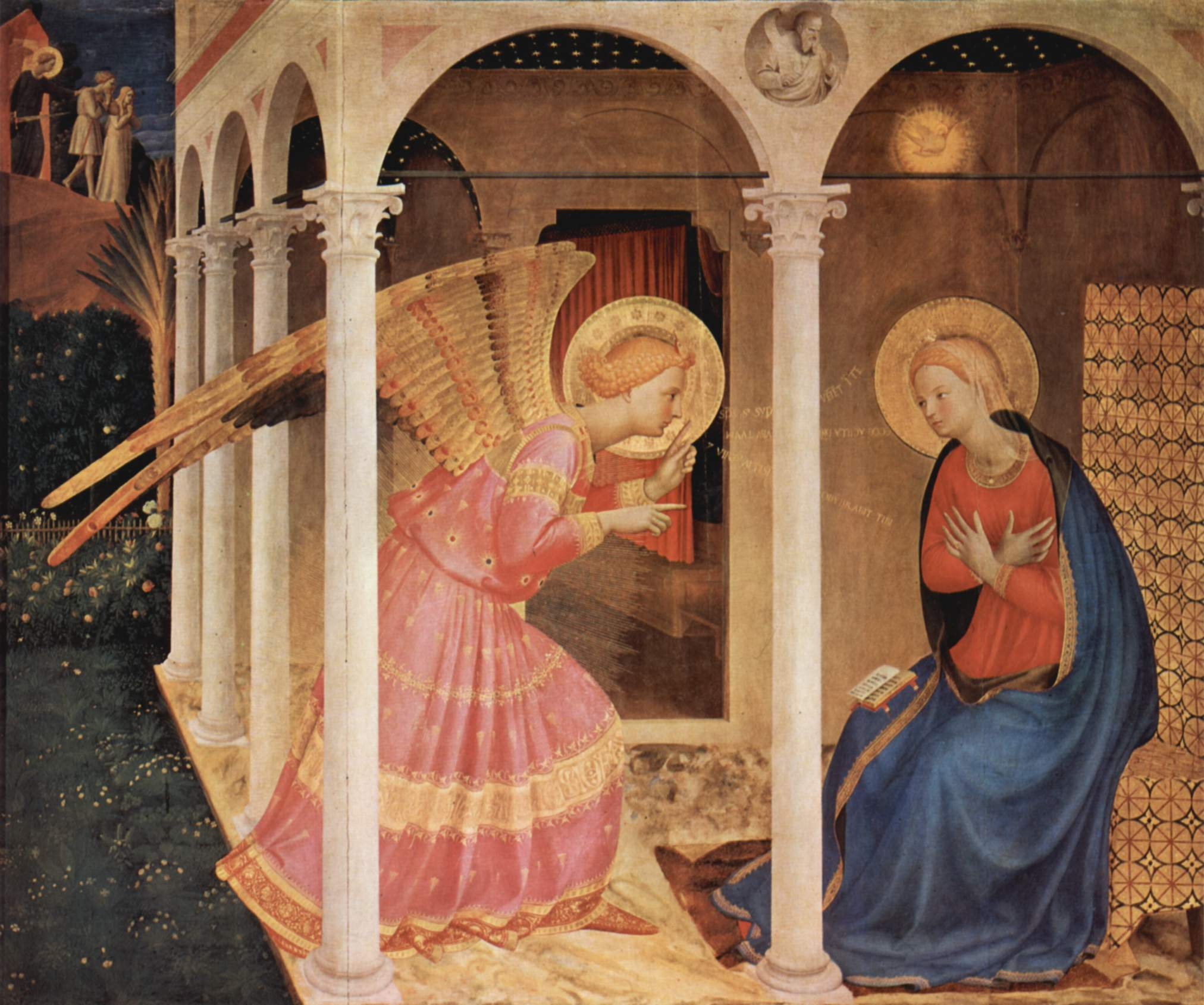
The Annunciation by Fra Angelico, 1433–1434

The Hail Mary or Ave Maria (from its first words in Latin) is a traditional Catholic prayer addressing Mary, the mother of Jesus. The prayer is based on two biblical passages featured in the Gospel of Luke: the Angel Gabriel's visit to Mary (the Annunciation) and Mary's subsequent visit to Elizabeth, the mother of John the Baptist. It is also called the Angelic Salutation due to the prayer's basis on Archangel Gabriel's words to Mary.

Hail Mary is a prayer of praise for and of petition to Mary, regarded as the Theotokos (Mother of God). Since the 16th century, the version of the prayer used in the Catholic Church closes with an appeal for her intercession. The prayer takes different forms in various traditions and has often been set to music.

In the Latin Church, the Hail Mary forms the basis of other prayers such as the Angelus and the Rosary. In some Oriental Orthodox traditions, theotokia in psalmody are devoted to praising the Mother of God. In addition, the Eastern Orthodox Churches have a common private prayer quite similar to the Hail Mary, though without the explicit request for intercession. The Eastern Catholic Churches follow their respective traditions or adopt the Latin Church version, which is also used by many other Western groups historically branching from the Catholic Church, such as Lutherans, Anglicans, Independent Catholics, and Old Catholics.

== Text ==
The Latin version of the prayer is the most common in English-speaking and other Western countries.

Ave Maria, gratia plena,
Dominus tecum.
Benedicta tu in mulieribus,
et benedictus fructus ventris tui, Iesus.
Sancta Maria, Mater Dei,
ora pro nobis peccatoribus,
nunc et in hora mortis nostrae. Amen.

Translation:

Hail Mary, full of grace,
The Lord is with thee.
Blessed art thou amongst women,
And blessed is the fruit of thy womb, Jesus.
Holy Mary, Mother of God,
Pray for us sinners,
Now and at the hour of our death. Amen.

== Biblical source ==
The prayer incorporates two greetings to Mary recorded in the Gospel of Luke: "Hail, full of grace, the Lord is with thee", (Note: Luke 1:28: Χαῖρε, κεχαριτωμένη, ὁ Κύριος μετὰ σοῦ; Chaire, kecharitōmenē, o Kyrios meta sou.) and "Blessed art thou amongst women and blessed is the fruit of thy womb". (Note: Luke 1:42: Εύλογημένη σὺ ἐν γυναιξὶν καὶ εὐλογημένος ὁ καρπὸς τῆς κοιλίας σου; Eulogēmenē su en gynaixin kai eulogēmenos o karpos tēs koilias sou.) In mid-13th-century Western Europe, the prayer consisted only of these words with the single addition of the name "Mary" after the word "Hail", as is evident from Thomas Aquinas's commentary on the prayer.

The first is the angel's greeting at the Annunciation, the second from Elizabeth's greeting at the Visitation, and taken together, these two passages are the two times Mary is greeted in chapter 1 of the Gospel of Luke.

=== Annunciation ===
The first of the two passages from the Gospel of Luke is the greeting of the Angel Gabriel to Mary, originally written in Koine Greek. The opening word of greeting, χαῖρε (chaíre), here translated "hail", literally has the meaning "rejoice" or "be glad". This was the normal greeting in the language in which the Gospel of Luke is written and continues to be used in the same sense in Modern Greek. Accordingly, both "hail" and "rejoice" are valid English translations of the word ("hail" reflecting the Latin translation, and "rejoice" reflecting the original Greek).

According to Pope Benedict XVI, "at first sight the term chaire "rejoice", seems an ordinary greeting, typical in the Greek world, but if this word is interpreted against the background of the biblical tradition it acquires a far deeper meaning. The same term occurs four times in the Greek version of the Old Testament and always as a proclamation of joy in the coming of the Messiah (cf. Zeph 3:14, Joel 2:21; Zech 9:9; Lam 4:21). The Angel’s greeting to Mary is therefore an invitation to joy, deep joy. It announces an end to the sadness that exists in the world because of life’s limitations, suffering, death, wickedness, in all that seems to block out the light of the divine goodness. It is a greeting that marks the beginning of the Gospel, the Good News."

The word κεχαριτωμένη (kecharitōménē), here translated as "graceful", admits of various translations. Grammatically, the word is the feminine perfect passive participle of the verb χαριτόω (charitóō), which means "to show, or bestow with, grace" and here, in the passive voice, "to have grace shown, or bestowed upon, one".

The text also appears in the account of the annunciation contained in chapter 9 of the apocryphal Infancy Gospel of Matthew.

=== Visitation ===
The second part of the prayer is taken from Elizabeth's greeting to Mary as recorded in Luke 1:42: "Blessed art thou among women, and blessed is the fruit of thy womb."

== In Western Latin tradition ==
After considering the use of similar words in Syriac, Greek and Latin in the 6th century, Herbert Thurston, writing in the Catholic Encyclopedia concludes that "there is little or no trace of the Hail Mary as an accepted devotional formula before about 1050" – though a later pious tale attributed to Ildephonsus of Toledo (fl. 7th century) the use of the first part, namely the angel's greeting to Mary, without that of Elizabeth, as a prayer. All the evidence suggests that it took its rise from certain versicles and responsories occurring in the Little Office of the Blessed Virgin Mary, which just at that time was coming into favour among the monastic orders.

Thomas Aquinas spoke of the name "Mary" as the only word added at his time to the Biblical text, to indicate the person who was "full of grace". But at about the same time the name "Jesus" was also added, to specify who was meant by the phrase "the fruit of thy womb".

The Western version of the prayer is thus not derived from the Greek version: even the earliest Western forms have no trace of the Greek version's phrases: "Mother of God and Virgin" and "for thou hast given birth to the Saviour of our souls".

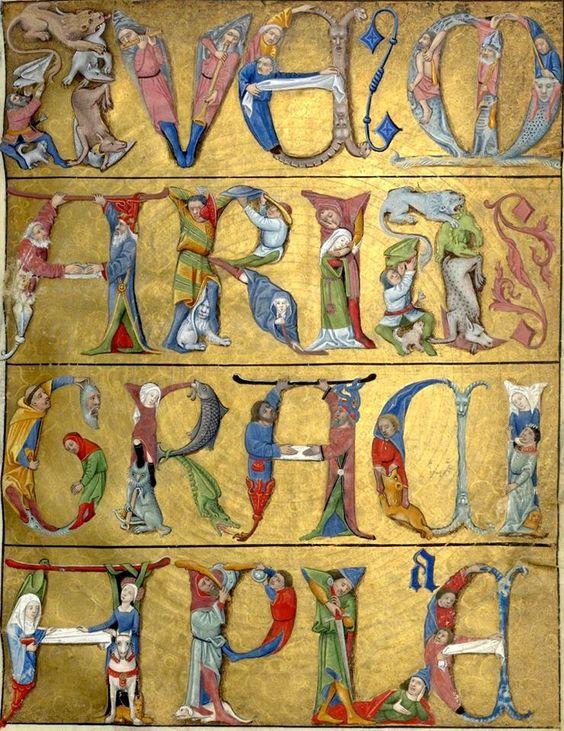
The beginning of the verse in historiated letters in the book of hours Heures de Charles d'Angoulême

To the greeting and praise of Mary of which the prayer thus consisted, a petition "Holy Mary, Mother of God, pray for us sinners now and at the hour of our death" was added later. The petition first appeared in print in 1495 in Girolamo Savonarola's Esposizione sopra l'Ave Maria. The "Hail Mary" prayer in Savonarola's exposition reads: "Hail Mary, full of grace, the Lord is with thee; blessed art thou amongst women, and blessed is the fruit of thy womb, Jesus. Holy Mary, Mother of God, pray for us sinners, now and at the hour of our death. Amen." (Note: The prayer is printed in Latin on the first page of the exposition and reads: "Ave Maria gratia plena Dominus tecum Benedicta tu in mulieribus et benedictus Fructus uentris tui Iesus sancta Maria mater Dei ora pro nobis peccatoribus nunc et in hora mortis nostrae. Amen".)

The petition was commonly added around the time of the Council of Trent. The Dutch Jesuit Petrus Canisius is credited with adding in 1555 in his Catechism the sentence

Holy Mary, Mother of God, pray for us sinners.

Eleven years later, the sentence was included in the Catechism of the Council of Trent of 1566. The catechism says that to the first part of the Hail Mary, by which "we render to God the highest praise and return Him most gracious thanks, because He has bestowed all His heavenly gifts on the most holy Virgin ... the Church of God has wisely added prayers and an invocation addressed to the most holy Mother of God. ...We should earnestly implore her help and assistance; for that she possesses exalted merits with God, and that she is most desirous to assist us by her prayers, no one can doubt without impiety and wickedness." Soon after, in 1568 Pope Pius V included the full form as now known in his revision of the Roman Breviary.

The current Latin version is thus as follows, with accents added to indicate how the prayer is said in the current Ecclesiastical Latin pronunciation:

Ave María, gratia plena,
Dominus tecum.
Benedícta tu in mulieribus,
et benedictus fructus ventris tui, Iesus. (Note: With Pope John XXIII's edition of the Roman Missal, the use of the letter J in printing Latin was dropped even in liturgical books, which had preserved that usage long after it ceased in the printing of ordinary Latin texts, including documents of the Holy See.)
Sancta Maria, Mater Déi,
ora pro nobis peccatoribus,
nunc et in hora mortis nostrae. Amen.

Translation:

Hail Mary, full of grace,
the Lord is with thee.
Blessed art thou amongst women,
and blessed is the fruit of thy womb, Jesus.
Holy Mary, Mother of God,
pray for us sinners,
now and at the hour of our death. Amen.

Ecclesiastical pronunciation of the Latin prayer Ave Maria

Because recitation of the Angelus, a prayer within which the Hail Mary is recited three times, is usually accompanied by the ringing of the Angelus bell, words from the Ave Maria were often inscribed on bells.

=== Indulgence ===
The Enchiridion Indulgentiarum (Indulgences Handbook) grants the partial indulgence for this prayer.

== Byzantine Christian use ==
The Hail Mary prayer of the Eastern Orthodox Church and Byzantine Rite Catholic Churches is similar to the first part of the Latin Church form, with the addition of a very brief opening phrase and a short concluding phrase. It is well known and often used, though not quite as frequently as in the Western Church. It appears in several canons of prayer. It is typically sung thrice at the end of Vespers during an All-Night Vigil, and occurs many times in the course of daily prayer.

The Greek text, of which those in other languages are translations, is:

Θεοτόκε Παρθένε, χαῖρε, κεχαριτωμένη Μαρία, ὁ Κύριος μετὰ σοῦ. εὐλογημένη σὺ ἐν γυναιξί, καὶ εὐλογημένος ὁ καρπὸς τῆς κοιλίας σου, ὅτι Σωτῆρα ἔτεκες τῶν ψυχῶν ἡμῶν.

Translation:

God-bearing Virgin, rejoice, grace-filled Mary, the Lord with thee. Praised thou among women, and praised the fruit of thy womb, because it was the Saviour of our souls that thou borest.

To the Biblical texts this adds the opening invocation "Theotokos Virgin", the name "Mary", and the concluding phrase "because it was the Saviour of our souls that thou borest".

Another English rendering of the same text reads:

Mother of God (Note: Θεοτόκε literally means "God-bearer". The Greek phrase Μήτηρ Θεοῦ, corresponding literally to "Mother of God", appears regularly, in the abbreviated form ΜΡ ΘΥ, in icons representing her.) and Virgin, rejoice, Mary full of grace, the Lord is with thee. Blessed art thou amongst women, and blessed is the fruit of thy womb, for thou hast given birth to the Saviour of our souls.

or:

God-bearing (or: Theotokos) Virgin, rejoice, O Mary, full of grace. The Lord is with thee. Blessed art thou amongst women. Blessed is the fruit of thy womb, for thou hast brought forth the Savior of our souls.

=== Aramaic version ===
The Aramaic version has been reconstructed (probably from Arabic) by Afram Barsoum in the following way:

Aramaic
Text	Transliteration
ܫܠܳܡ ܠܶܟ̣ܝ̱ ܒܬ̣ܽܘܠܬܳܐ ܡܰܪܝܰܡ ܡܰܠܝܰܬ̣ ܛܰܝܒܽܘܬ̣ܳܐ.	Shlom lekh (Note: This formula translates the Aramaic Chalom and the Arabic Salam.) bthulto Maryam (Note: Mary, in Aramaic, is rendered as Maryam.) malyath taybutho,
ܡܳܪܰܢ ܥܰܡܶܟ̣ܝ̱.	moran 'amekh.
ܡܒܰܪܰܟ̣ܬܳܐ ܐܰܢ̱ܬܝ̱ ܒܢܶܫ̈ܶܐ.	Mbarakhto at bneshe.
ܘܰܡܒܰܪܰܟ ܗ̱ܽܘ ܦܺܐܪܳܐ ܕܰܒܟܰܪܣܶܟ̣ܝ̱. ܡܳܪܰܢ ܝܶܫܽܘܥ.	Wambarakhu firo dabkarsekh moran Yeshu'. (Note: Jesus)
ܐܳܘ ܩܰܕܺܝܫܬܳܐ ܡܰܪܝܰܡ ܝܳܠܕܰܬ̣ ܐܰܠܗܳܐ.	O qadishto Maryam yoldath Aloho. (Note: God)
ܨܰܠܳܝ ܚܠܳܦܰܝܢ ܚܰܛܳܝ̈ܶܐ.	Saloy hlofayn hatoye,
ܗܳܫܳܐ ܘܰܒܫܳܥܰܬ ܘܡܰܘܬܰܢ	hosho wabsho'at u mawtan.
ܐܰܡܺܝܢ܀	Amin.

=== Slavonic versions ===
There exist two variant versions in Church Slavonic:

Cyrillic
Romanization
English Translation

Богородице дѣво радѹйсѧ
ѡбрадованнаѧ Марїе
Господь съ тобою
благословена ты въ женахъ,
и благословенъ плодъ чрева твоегѡ,
Якѡ родила еси Христа Спаса,
Избавителѧ дѹшамъ нашимъ.

Bogorodice děvo, radujsę,
obradovannaę Marie,
Gospodǐ sǔ toboju.
blagoslovena ty vǔ ženaxǔ,
i blagoslovenǔ plodǔ čreva tvoego,
Jako rodila esi Xrista Spasa,
Izbavitelę dušamǔ našimǔ.

Theotokos Virgin, rejoice, (or: Rejoice, O Virgin Theotokos)
Mary full of grace,
the Lord is with thee.
Blessed art thou amongst women,
and blessed is the fruit of thy womb,
for thou hast borne Christ the Saviour,
the Deliverer of our souls.

Богородице дѣво, радѹйсѧ,
Благодатнаѧ Марїе,
Господь съ тобою:
благословена Ты въ женахъ,
и благословенъ плодъ чрева Твоегѡ;
якѡ Спаса родила еси дѹшъ нашихъ.

Bogorodice děvo, radujsę,
Blagodatnaę Marie,
Gospodǐ sǔ toboju:
Blagoslovena ty vǔ ženaxǔ,
I blagoslovenǔ plodǔ čreva tvoego,
jako Spasa rodila esi dušǔ našixǔ.

Theotokos Virgin, rejoice, (or: Rejoice, O Virgin Theotokos)
Mary full of grace,
The Lord is with thee.
Blessed art thou amongst women,
and blessed is the fruit of thy womb,
for thou hast borne the Saviour of our souls.

Church Slavonic Bogorodice děvo in traditional Cyrillic script

The first is the older, and remains in use by the Old Believers as well as those who follow the Ruthenian recension (among them the Ukrainian Greek-Catholic Church and the Ruthenian Catholic Church). The second, corresponding more closely to the Greek, appeared in 1656 under the liturgical reforms of Patriarch Nikon of Moscow, and is in use by the Russian Orthodox Church, the Serbian Orthodox Church, the Bulgarian Orthodox Church and the Ukrainian Orthodox Church.

=== Romanian version ===
„Născătoare de Dumnezeu, Fecioară, bucură-te! Ceea ce ești plină de har, Marie, Domnul este cu tine. Binecuvântată ești tu între femei și binecuvântat este rodul pântecelui tău, că ai născut pe Mântuitorul sufletelor noastre. Preasfântă Marie, Maica lui Dumnezeu, roagă-te pentru noi, păcătoșii, acum și-n ceasul morții noastre”.

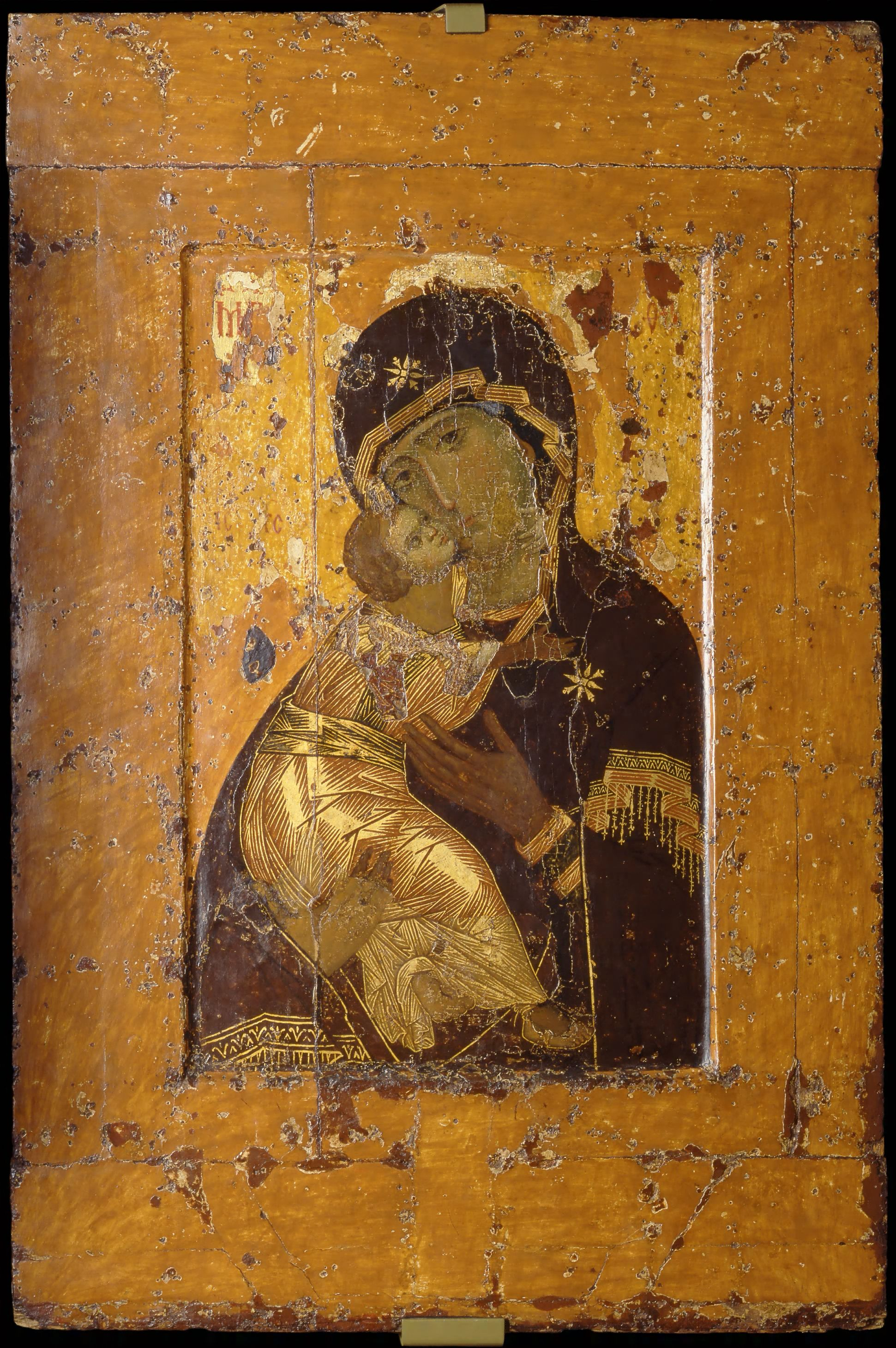
Υπεραγία Θεοτόκος

== Latin Church Catholic use ==
The Hail Mary is the last prayer in Appendix V of the present Roman Missal, the last of seven prayers under the heading "Thanksgiving After Mass". There it appears with "with you" instead of the traditional "with thee", "are you among" instead of the traditional "art thou amongst" and "your womb" in place of the traditional "thy womb":

Hail, Mary, full of grace, the Lord is with you;
blessed are you among women,
and blessed is the fruit of your womb, Jesus.
Holy Mary, Mother of God,
pray for us sinners
now and at the hour of our death.
Amen.

The Hail Mary is the central part of the Angelus, a devotion generally recited thrice daily by many Catholics, as well as high church Anglicans, and Lutherans who usually omit the second half.

The Hail Mary is an essential element of the Rosary, a prayer method in use especially among Roman Rite (Western) Catholics. The Eastern Catholic Churches say a similar version.

The Rosary consists traditionally of three sets of five Mysteries, each Mystery being meditated on while reciting a decade (a set of ten) of Ave Maria. The 150 Ave Maria of the Rosary thus echo the 150 psalms. These Mysteries concern events of Jesus' life during his childhood (Joyful Mysteries), Passion (Sorrowful Mysteries), and from his Resurrection onwards (Glorious Mysteries). Another set, the Luminous Mysteries, is of comparatively recent origin, having been proposed by Pope John Paul II in 2002. Each decade of Ave Maria is preceded by the Our Father (Pater Noster or The Lord's Prayer) and followed by the Glory Be (Gloria Patri or Doxology). The repetition of these fixed-language prayers assists recitation from the heart rather than the head. Pope Paul V said that "the Rosary is a treasure of graces ... even for those souls who pray without meditating, the simple act of taking the beads in hand to pray is already a remembrance of God – of the supernatural".

== Lutheran use ==
Martin Luther believed that Mary should be held in highest reverence, advocating the use of the original Hail Mary (that is, "Hail Mary, full of grace, the Lord is with thee. Blessed art thou amongst women and blessed is the fruit of thy womb, Jesus.") as a sign of reverence for and devotion to the Virgin. (Note: In keeping with the principle of sola scriptura, Luther exclusively emphasized the quotation from Luke 1:42, without addition.) The 1522 Betbüchlein (Prayer Book) retained the Hail Mary. The last part of the prayer used in Catholicism today ("Holy Mary, Mother of God, pray for us sinners now and at the hour of our death") was not in use in Germany at the time.

== Anglican use ==
Some Anglicans also employ the Hail Mary in devotional practice. Anglo-Catholic Anglicans use the prayer in much the same way as Roman Catholics, including use of the Rosary and the recitation of the Angelus. Many Anglican churches contain artistic depictions of the Virgin Mary, but only a minority use Marian devotional prayers such as the Hail Mary. That manifestation of veneration of Mary, decried by some Protestants as Mariolatry, was largely removed from Anglican churches during the English Reformation but was reintroduced to some extent during the Oxford Movement of the mid-1800s.

== Musical settings ==
"Ave Maria"
The prayer as a traditional Latin Gregorian chant

"Ave Maria"
The second of Anton Bruckner's three settings of "Ave Maria"

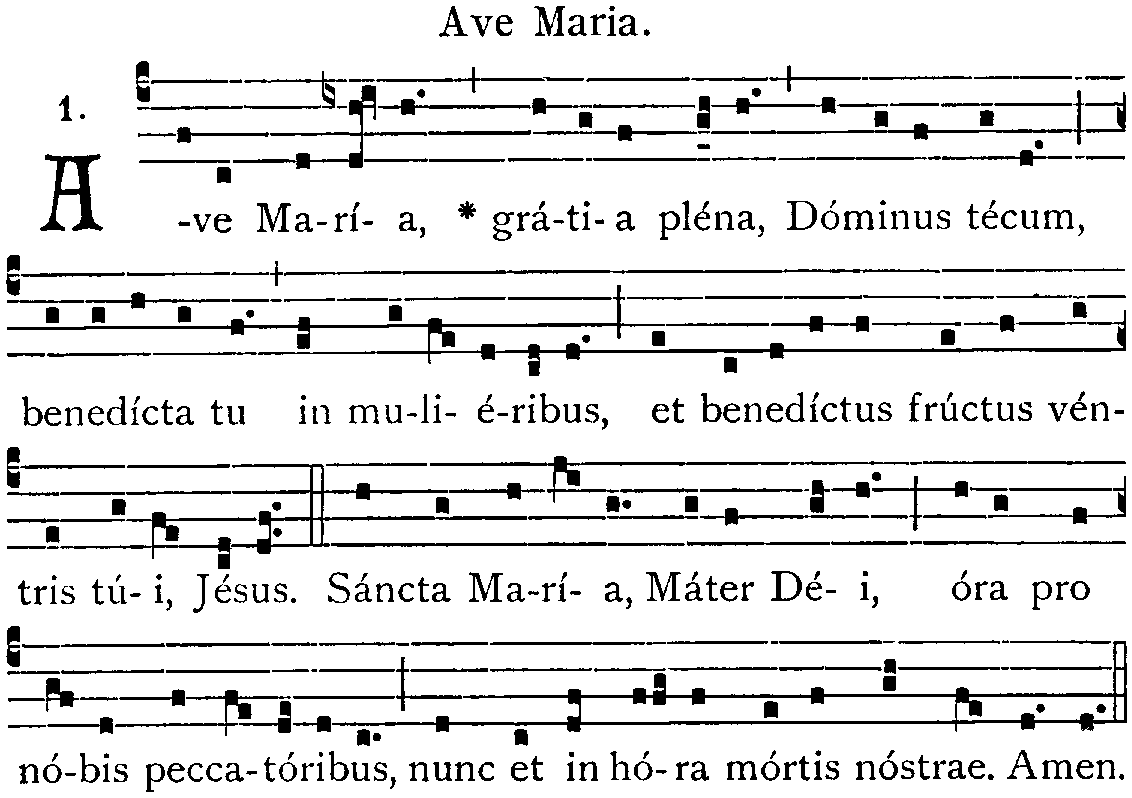
The traditional Gregorian chant in square notation

The Hail Mary (Ave Maria in Latin) has been set to music numerous times. The title "Ave Maria" has been given also to musical compositions that are not settings of the prayer.

One of the most famous is the version by Franz Schubert (1825), composed as Ellens dritter Gesang (Ellen's Third Song), D839, part 6 of his Opus 52, a setting of seven songs from Walter Scott's popular epic poem "The Lady of the Lake", translated into German by Adam Storck. Although it opens with the greeting "Ave Maria" ("Hail Mary"), the text was not that of the traditional prayer, but nowadays it is commonly sung with words of the prayer. Its music was used in the final segment of Disney's Fantasia.

In Gounod's version, he superimposed melody and the words to the first prelude from Bach's The Well-Tempered Clavier, omitting only the words "Mater Dei" (Mother of God).

Anton Bruckner wrote three different settings, the best known being a motet for seven voices. Antonín Dvořák's version was composed in 1877. Another setting of Ave Maria was written by Giuseppe Verdi as part for his 1887 opera Otello. Russian composer César Cui, who was raised Roman Catholic, set the text at least three times: as the "Ave Maria", op. 34, for one or two women's voices with piano or harmonium (1886), and as part of two of his operas: Le flibustier (premiered 1894) and Mateo Falcone (1907).

Settings also exist by Wolfgang Amadeus Mozart, Franz Liszt, William Byrd, Edward Elgar, Camille Saint-Saëns, Jacques Offenbach, Gioachino Rossini, Johannes Brahms, Igor Stravinsky, Pietro Mascagni, Morten Lauridsen, David Conte and Lorenzo Perosi as well as numerous versions by less well-known composers, such as J. B. Tresch, Margit Sztaray, Mme. Tarbé des Sablons, Einojuhani Rautavaara and Ninel Samokhvalova.

In the Renaissance, this text was also set by numerous composers, including Josquin des Prez, Orlando di Lasso, Tomás Luis de Victoria, and Giovanni Pierluigi da Palestrina. Before the Council of Trent there were actually different versions of the text, so the earlier composers in the period sometimes set versions of the text different from the ones shown above. Josquin des Prez, for example, himself set more than one version of the Ave Maria. Here is the text of his motet "Ave Maria ... Virgo serena", which begins with the first six words above and continues with a poem in rhymed couplets.

Ave Maria, gratia plena,
Dominus tecum, Virgo serena.
Ave cuius conceptio,
solemni plena gaudio,
celestia, terrestria,
nova replet letitia.
Ave cuius nativitas,
nostra fuit solemnitas,
ut lucifer lux oriens
verum solem preveniens.
Ave pia humilitas,
sine viro fecunditas,
cuius annunciatio
nostra fuit salvatio.
Ave vera virginitas,
immaculata castitas,
cuius purificatio
nostra fuit purgatio.
Ave preclara omnibus
angelicis virtutibus,
cuius fuit assumptio
nostra glorificatio.
O Mater Dei, memento mei. Amen.

The much-anthologized "Ave Maria" by Jacques Arcadelt is actually a 19th-century arrangement by Pierre-Louis Dietsch, loosely based on Arcadelt's three part madrigal "Nous voyons que les hommes".

In the 20th century, Franz Biebl composed Ave Maria (Angelus Domini), actually a setting of the Angelus prayer, in which the Ave Maria is repeated three times, but its second part only once as the climax.

In Slavonic, the text was also a popular subject for setting to music by Eastern European composers. These include Sergei Rachmaninov, Igor Stravinsky, Bortniansky, Vladimir Vavilov (his version often misattributed to Giulio Caccini), Mikhail Shukh, Lyudmyla Hodzyumakha and others.

A famous setting for the Orthodox version of the prayer in Church Slavonic (Bogoroditsye Djevo) was composed by Sergei Rachmaninoff in his All-Night Vigil.

Since Protestant Christianity generally avoids any special veneration of Mary, musical settings of the prayer are sometimes sung to other texts that preserve the word boundaries and syllable stresses.

== See also ==
- Devotion of the Three Hail Marys
- Hail Mary pass
- Marian devotions
