= Margit Sztáray =

Polish composer

Countess Margit Sztáray de Nagymihály (born 1859) was a Polish composer, who is best known today for her choral arrangement of Ave Maria.

Sztaray was the daughter of Count Ferdinand Sztáray de Sztára et Nagymihály and Gabriella Vécsey de Hernádvécse et Hajnácskeő. She spent some time at the Vienna Conservatory around 1900, possibly as a teacher. She wrote songs, as well as sacred music with organ accompaniment, which were published by Feuchtinger & Gleichauf of Regensburg, Germany. Her publications include:

- Ave Maria (four women’s voices and organ)
- Katholische Kirchen-Gesänge (Catholic Church Chants)
