= Sataf =

Sataf صطاف
- Village
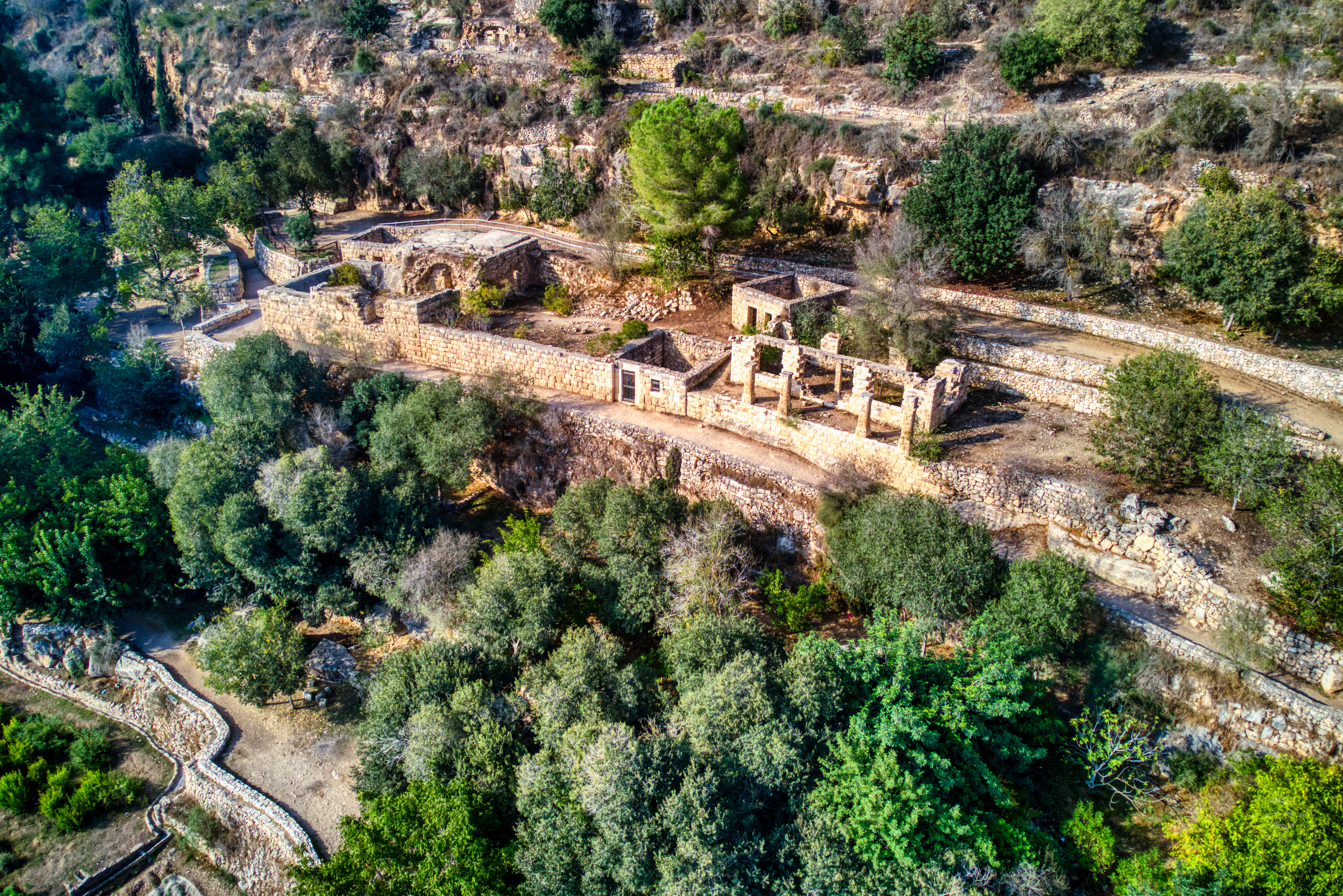
- Remains of Sataf village
- Etymology: from a personal name
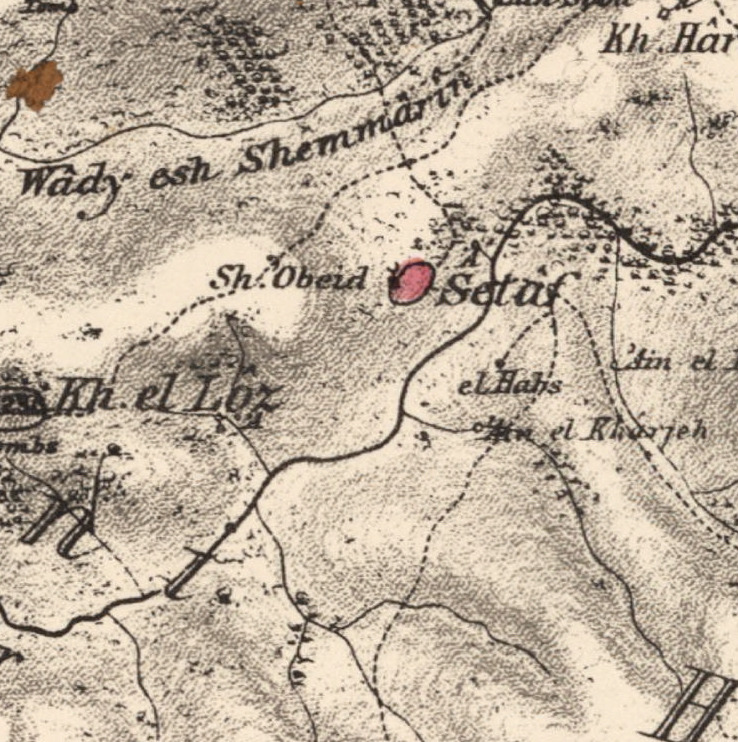
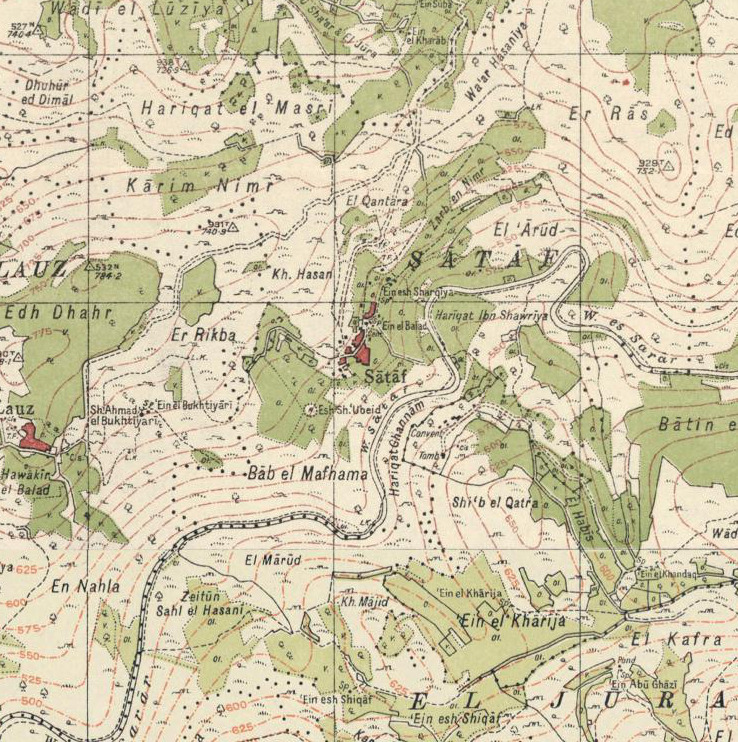
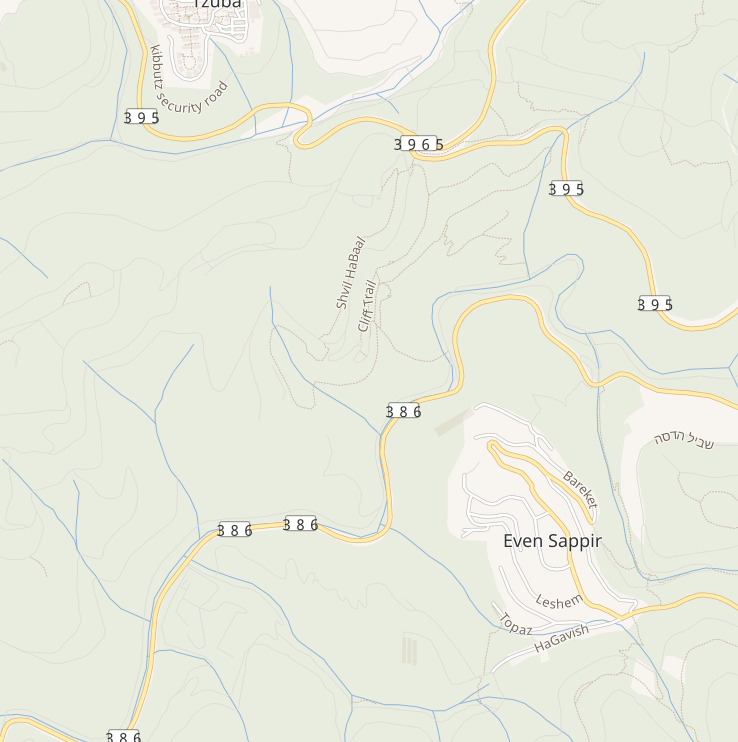
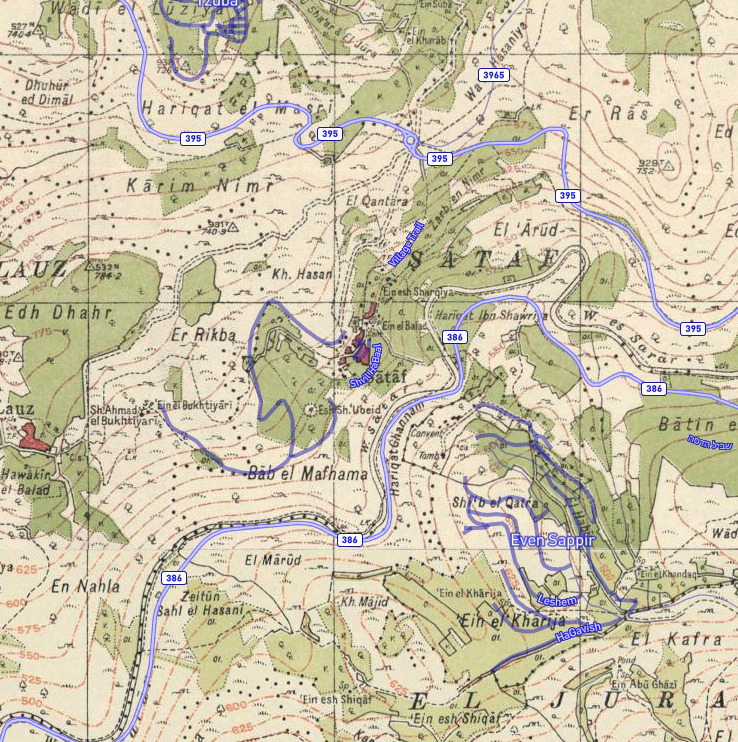
- 1870s map 1940s map modern map 1940s with modern overlay map A series of historical maps of the area around Sataf (click the buttons)

- Location within Mandatory Palestine
- Coordinates: 31°46′9″N 35°7′38″E
- Palestine grid: 162/130
- Geopolitical entity: Mandatory Palestine
- Subdistrict: Jerusalem
- Date of depopulation: July 13–14, 1948

Area
  - Total: 3,775 dunams (3.775 km^{2}; 1.458 sq mi)

Population (1945)
  - Total: 540
- Cause(s) of depopulation: Military assault by Yishuv forces

Sataf (Arabic: صطاف, Hebrew: סטף) was a Palestinian village in the Jerusalem Subdistrict depopulated during the 1948 Arab–Israeli War. It was located 10 km west of Jerusalem, with Sorek Valley (Arabic: Wadi as-Sarar) bordering to the east.

Two springs, Ein Sataf and Ein Bikura flow from the site into the riverbed below.

A monastery located across the valley from Sataf, i.e. south of Wadi as-Sarar, known by local Arabs as Ein el-Habis (the "Spring of the Hermitage"), is officially called Monastery of Saint John in the Wilderness.

Today it is a tourist site showcasing ancient agricultural techniques used in the Jerusalem Mountains.

== History ==
=== Chalcolithic period ===
Remains of a 4,000 BCE Chalcolithic village were discovered at the site. The related traces of agricultural activities number among the oldest in the region.

=== Byzantine period ===
Most ancient remains date to the Byzantine period.

=== Mamluk period ===
The first written mention of the site is from the Mamluk era.

=== Ottoman period ===
Sataf was noted in the Ottoman tax records of 1525-1526 and 1538–1539, as being located in the Sanjak of Al-Quds. According to archaeological work, the village originated in the late 16th century, with the use of several cave−dwellings. Later, houses were erected in front of the caves.

In 1838 it was described as a Muslim village, located in the Beni Hasan district, west of Jerusalem.

In 1863, Victor Guérin found a village of one hundred and eighty people. He further noted that their houses were standing on the slopes of a mountain, and that the mountainside was covered by successive terraces. An Ottoman village list from about 1870 counted 38 houses and a population of 115, whereby only men were counted.

In 1883, the Palestine Exploration Fund's Survey of Western Palestine described Setaf as "a village of moderate size, of stone houses, perched on the steep side of a valley. It has a spring lower down, on the north."

In 1896 the population of Sataf was estimated to be about 180 persons.

=== British Mandate period ===
By the 1922 census of Palestine conducted by the British Mandate authorities, Sataf had a population of 329; 321 Muslims and 8 Christians. All the Christians were Roman Catholic. The 1931 census lists 381 inhabitants; 379 Muslim and 2 Christian, in a total of 101 houses.

In the 1945 statistics the population of Sataf was 540, all Muslims, and the total land area was 3,775 dunams, according to an official land and population survey. Of this, 928 dunams were plantations and irrigable land, 465 for cereals, while 22 dunams were built-up land.

=== 1948, aftermath ===
On July 13–14, 1948 the Arab village was depopulated by the Har'el Brigade, during Operation Danny. Sataf and the surrounding area became part of the newly created State of Israel.

A short time after the 1948 War, a small group of Jewish immigrants from North Africa settled for a few months in the village area, calling it Bikura. The village, which lasted only until the fall of 1950, was founded on the initiative of former Lehi commanded Natan Yellin-Mor. Subsequently, the IDF's Unit 101 and paratroopers used the site for training purposes.

In the 1980s the Jewish National Fund began the restoration of ancient agricultural terraces, and the area around the springs has been turned into a tourist site. A forest around the site was also planted by the Jewish National Fund.

In 1992, Sataf was described as follows: "Many half-destroyed walls still stand, and some still have arched doorways. The walls of a few houses with collapsed roofs are almost intact....The area around the village spring, which is located to the east next to the ruins of a rectangular stone house, has been turned into an Israeli tourist site. A Jewish family has settled on the west side of the village, and have fenced in some of the village area."

== Shrine of 'Ubayd ==
The shrine (maqam) of 'Ubayd, southwest of the village site, contains a courtyard and three rooms. According to Tawfiq Canaan, Sheikh 'Ubayd "is said to kill any goat or sheep who enters his cave."

== Gallery ==
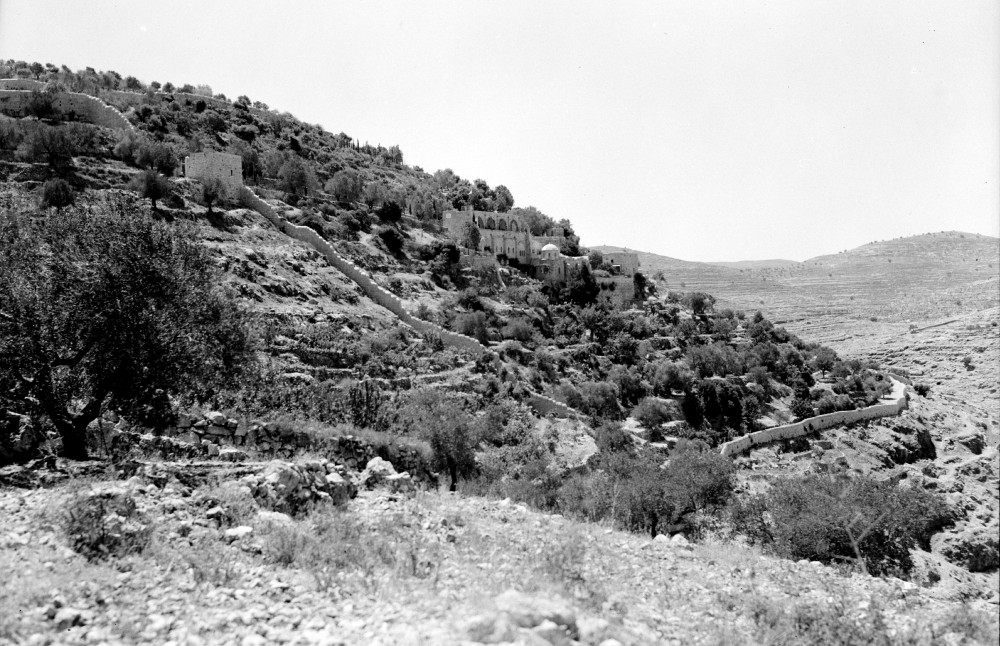
The hill (jabal) across from Sataf. September 1, 1945.

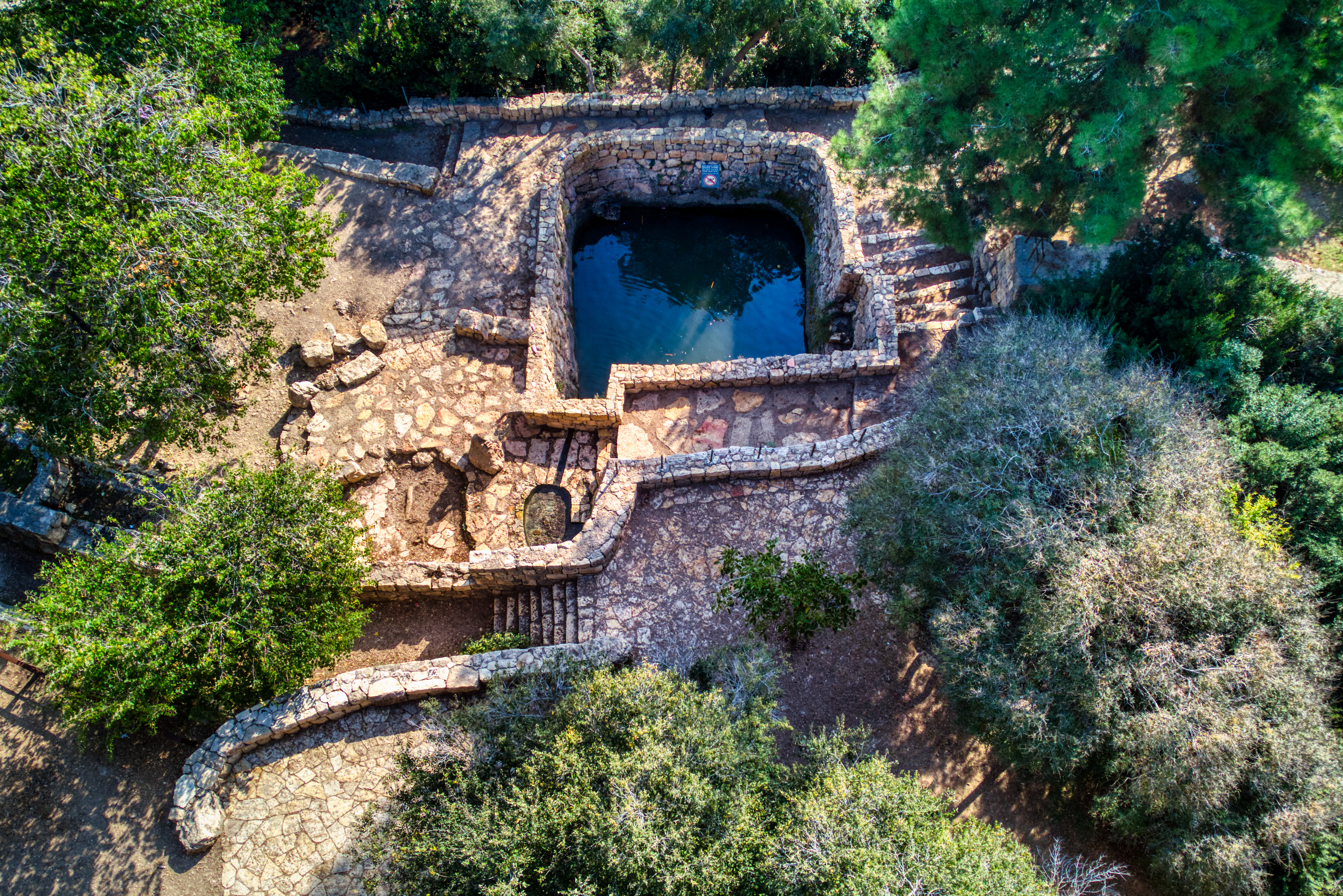
Ein Sataf (Ein El-Balad), 2022

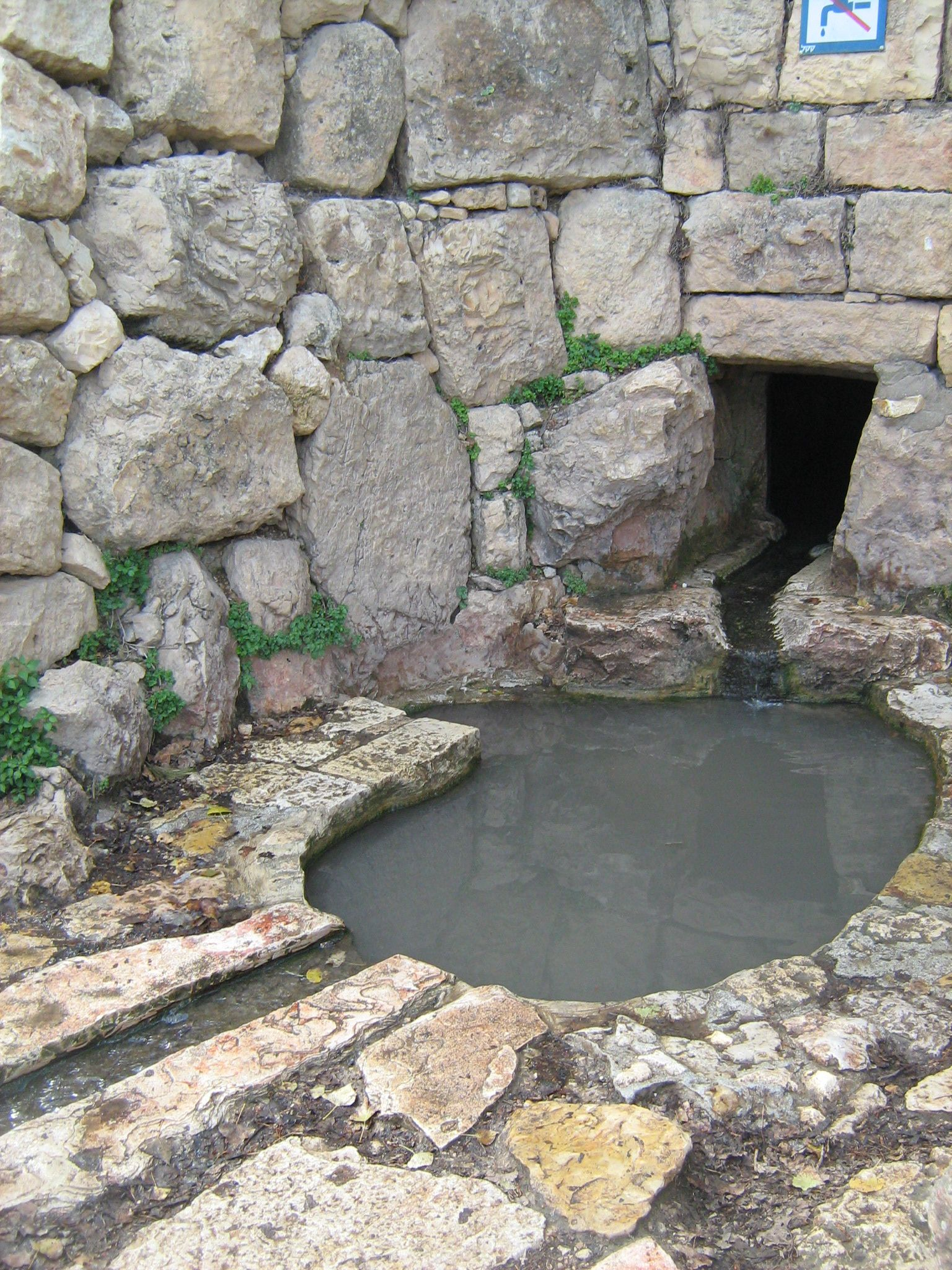
Ein Sataf, 2009

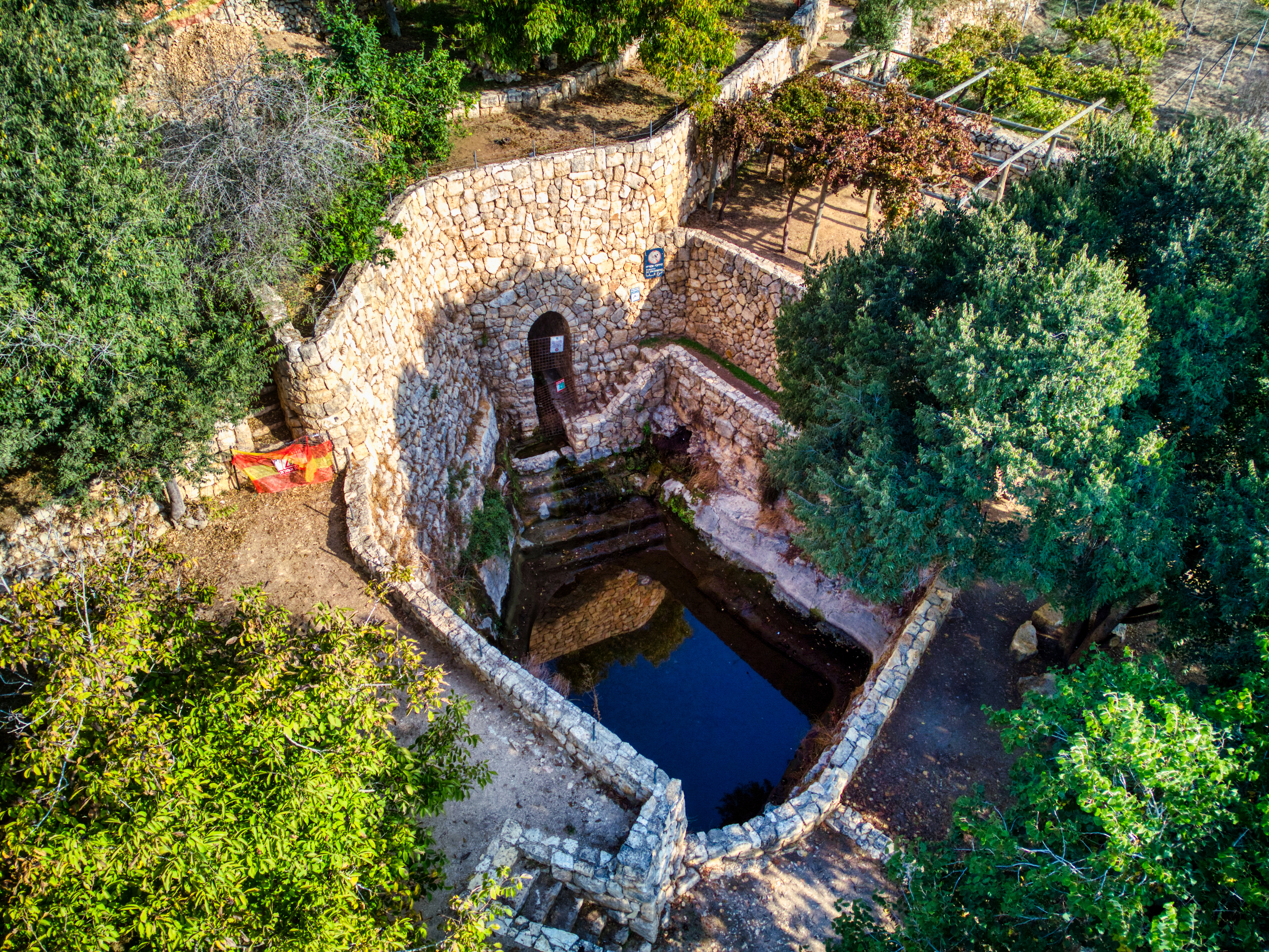
Ein Bikura (Ein E-Sharkia), 2022

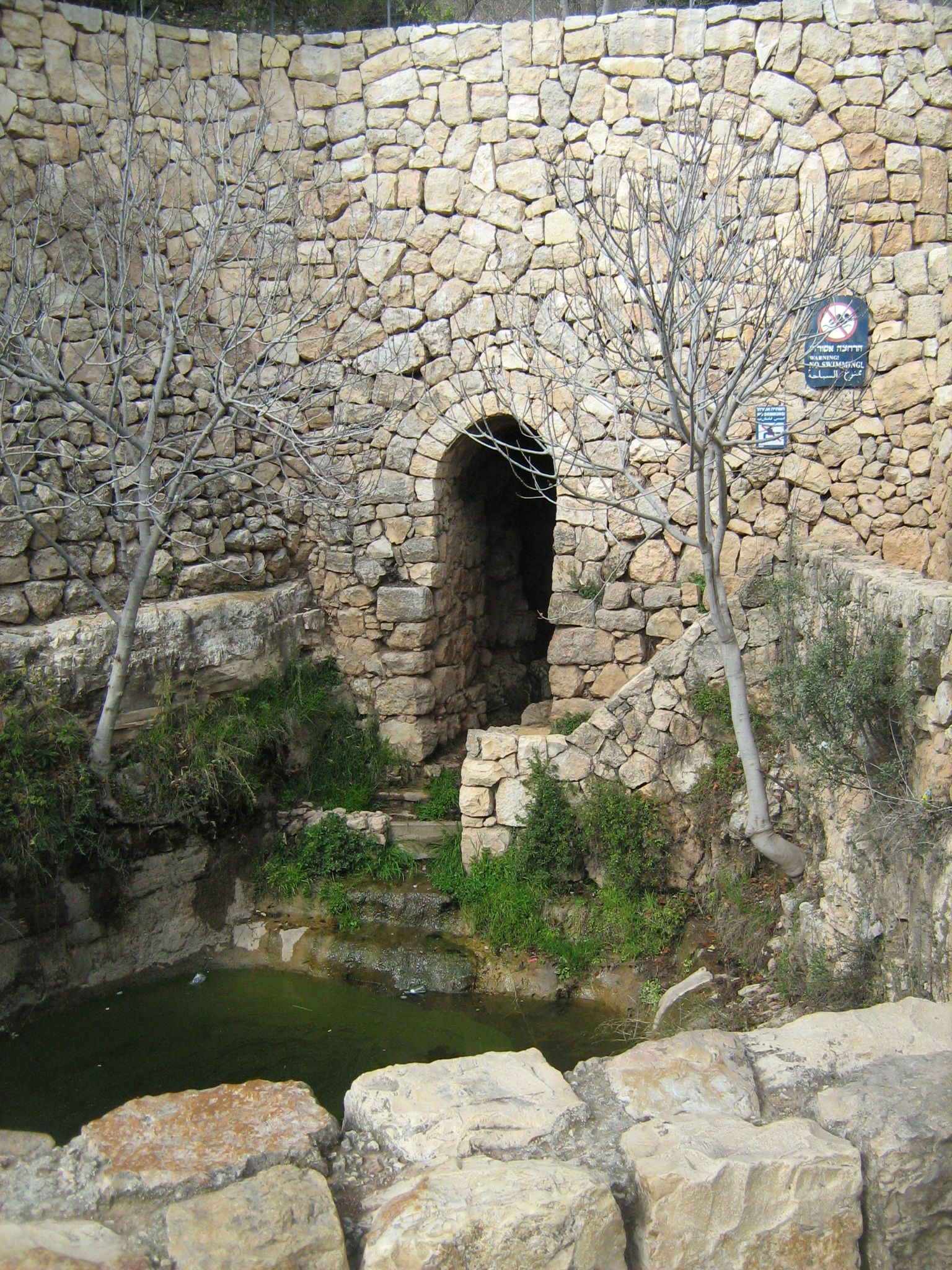
Ein Bikura, 2009

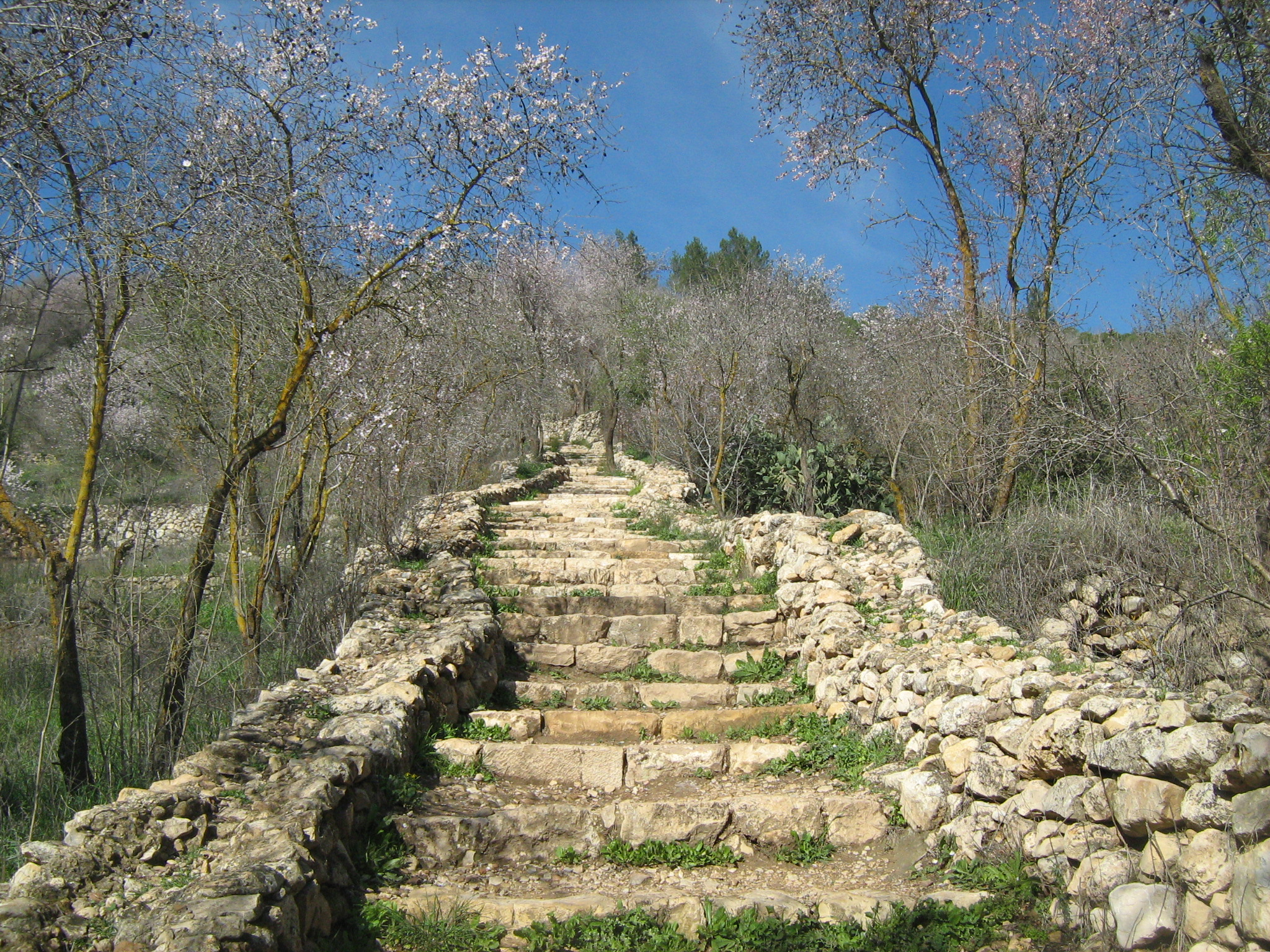
Sataf reconstruction

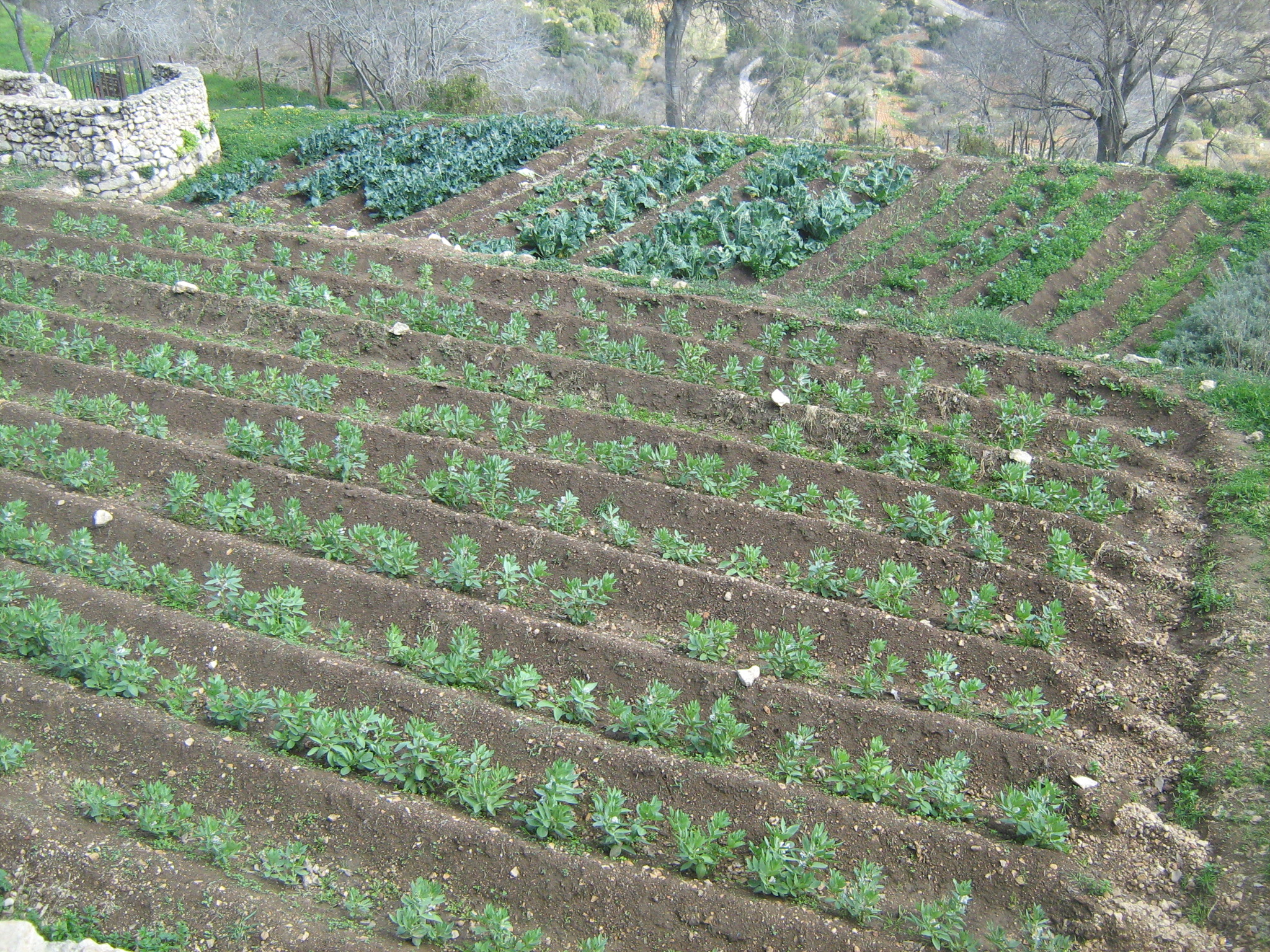
Agriculture in Sataf, 2009

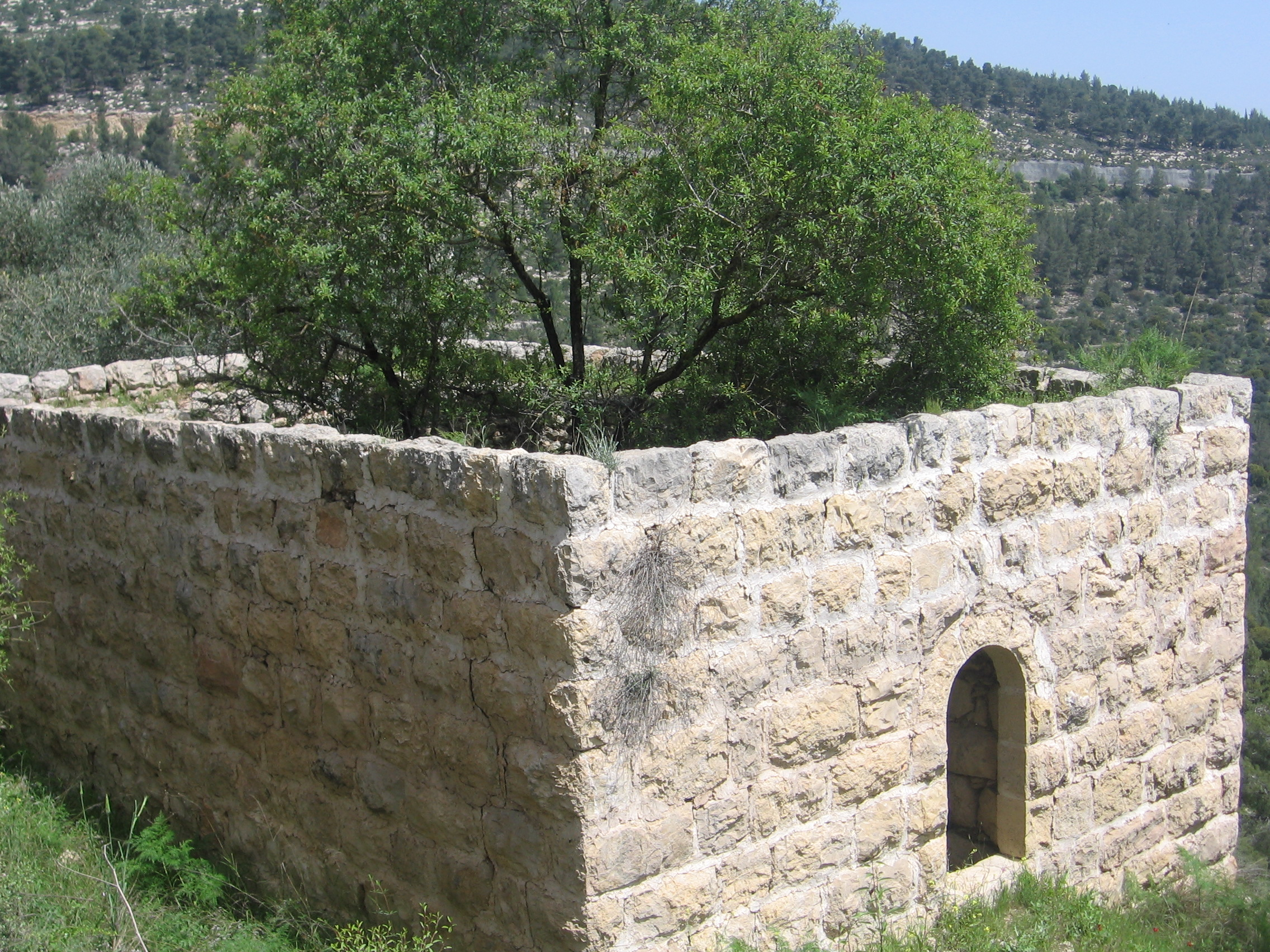
Remains of Sataf village

== Bibliography ==
- Barron, J.B., ed. (1923). Palestine: Report and General Abstracts of the Census of 1922. Government of Palestine.
- Canaan, T. (1927). Mohammedan Saints and Sanctuaries in Palestine. London: Luzac & Co. Archived from the original on 2019-05-16.
- Conder, C.R.; Kitchener, H.H. (1883). The Survey of Western Palestine: Memoirs of the Topography, Orography, Hydrography, and Archaeology. Vol. 3. London: Committee of the Palestine Exploration Fund.
- Government of Palestine, Department of Statistics (1945). Village Statistics, April, 1945.
- Guérin, V. (1869). Description Géographique Historique et Archéologique de la Palestine (in French). Vol. 1: Judee, pt. 2. Paris: L'Imprimerie Nationale.
- Hadawi, S. (1970). Village Statistics of 1945: A Classification of Land and Area ownership in Palestine. Palestine Liberation Organization Research Center.
- Hartmann, M. (1883). "Die Ortschaftenliste des Liwa Jerusalem in dem türkischen Staatskalender für Syrien auf das Jahr 1288 der Flucht (1871)". Zeitschrift des Deutschen Palästina-Vereins. 6: 102–149.
- Khalidi, W. (1992). All That Remains: The Palestinian Villages Occupied and Depopulated by Israel in 1948. Washington D.C.: Institute for Palestine Studies. ISBN 0-88728-224-5.
- Mills, E., ed. (1932). Census of Palestine 1931. Population of Villages, Towns and Administrative Areas. Jerusalem: Government of Palestine.
- Morris, B. (2004). The Birth of the Palestinian Refugee Problem Revisited. Cambridge University Press. ISBN 978-0-521-00967-6.
- Palmer, E.H. (1881). The Survey of Western Palestine: Arabic and English Name Lists Collected During the Survey by Lieutenants Conder and Kitchener, R. E. Transliterated and Explained by E.H. Palmer. Committee of the Palestine Exploration Fund.
- Petersen, Andrew (2001). A Gazetteer of Buildings in Muslim Palestine (British Academy Monographs in Archaeology). Vol. 1. Oxford University Press. ISBN 978-0-19-727011-0.
- Robinson, E.; Smith, E. (1841). Biblical Researches in Palestine, Mount Sinai and Arabia Petraea: A Journal of Travels in the year 1838. Vol. 3. Boston: Crocker & Brewster.
- Schick, C. (1896). "Zur Einwohnerzahl des Bezirks Jerusalem". Zeitschrift des Deutschen Palästina-Vereins. 19: 120–127.
- Socin, A. (1879). "Alphabetisches Verzeichniss von Ortschaften des Paschalik Jerusalem". Zeitschrift des Deutschen Palästina-Vereins. 2: 135–163.
- Toledano, E. (1984). "The Sanjaq of Jerusalem in the Sixteenth Century: Aspects of Topography and Population". Archivum Ottomanicum. 9: 279–319. Archived from the original on 2016-03-05.
