= Monastery of Saint John in the Wilderness =

Catholic monastery in Even Sapir, Israel

Monastery of St. John in the Wilderness
- מנזר יוחנן במדבר
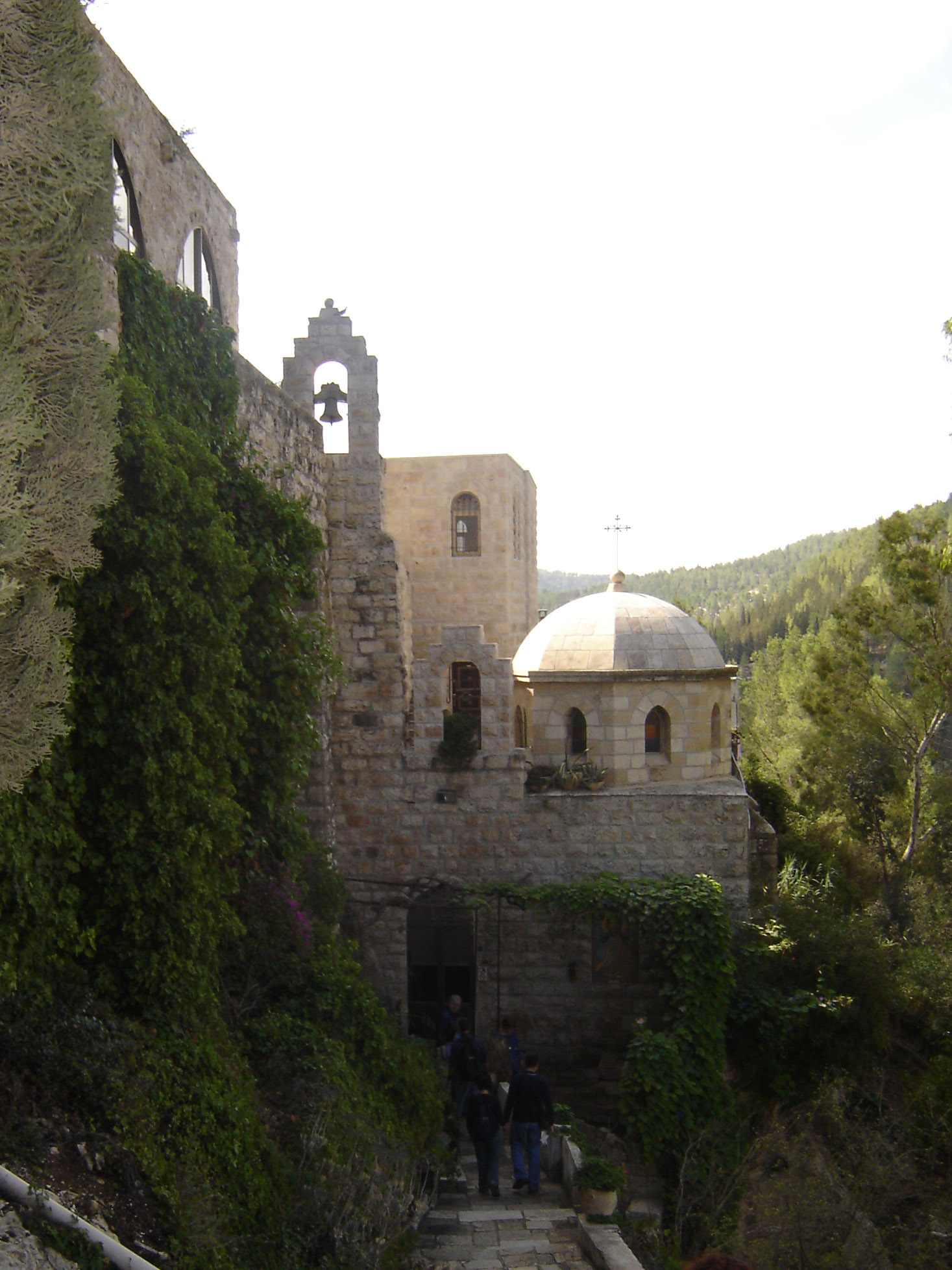

- Location within Israel

Monastery information
- Other names: Monastery of St. John in the Desert, Dir el-Habis
- Order: Franciscan
- Denomination: Roman Catholic
- Established: 6th century AD
- Dedication: John the Baptist
- Archdiocese: Catholic Archdiocese of Jerusalem

Architecture
- Architect: Antonio Barluzzi

Site
- Location: 'Ayn Karim/Even Sapir
- Country: Israel
- Coordinates: 31.7674°N 35.1308°E
- Public access: Yes
- Website: Custodia Terrae Sanctae

The Monastery of Saint John in the Wilderness is a Franciscan Catholic monastery built next to a spring on a wooded slope just north of Even Sapir, Israel, and across the valley from Sataf. It is located a short distance from Ein Karem, the traditional birthplace of Saint John the Baptist, and south of Jerusalem. It is also known as Saint John in the Desert or the Desert of Saint John. The convent is the property of the Franciscan Custody of the Holy Land.

== Significance ==
The monastery commemorates the "wilderness" in which St. John the Baptist lived as an orphaned child and throughout the years which prepared him for public ministry. According to tradition, John was born some 3 km away in Ein Karem, and Luke tells us that John "grew and became strong in spirit; and he lived in the desert until he appeared publicly to Israel".

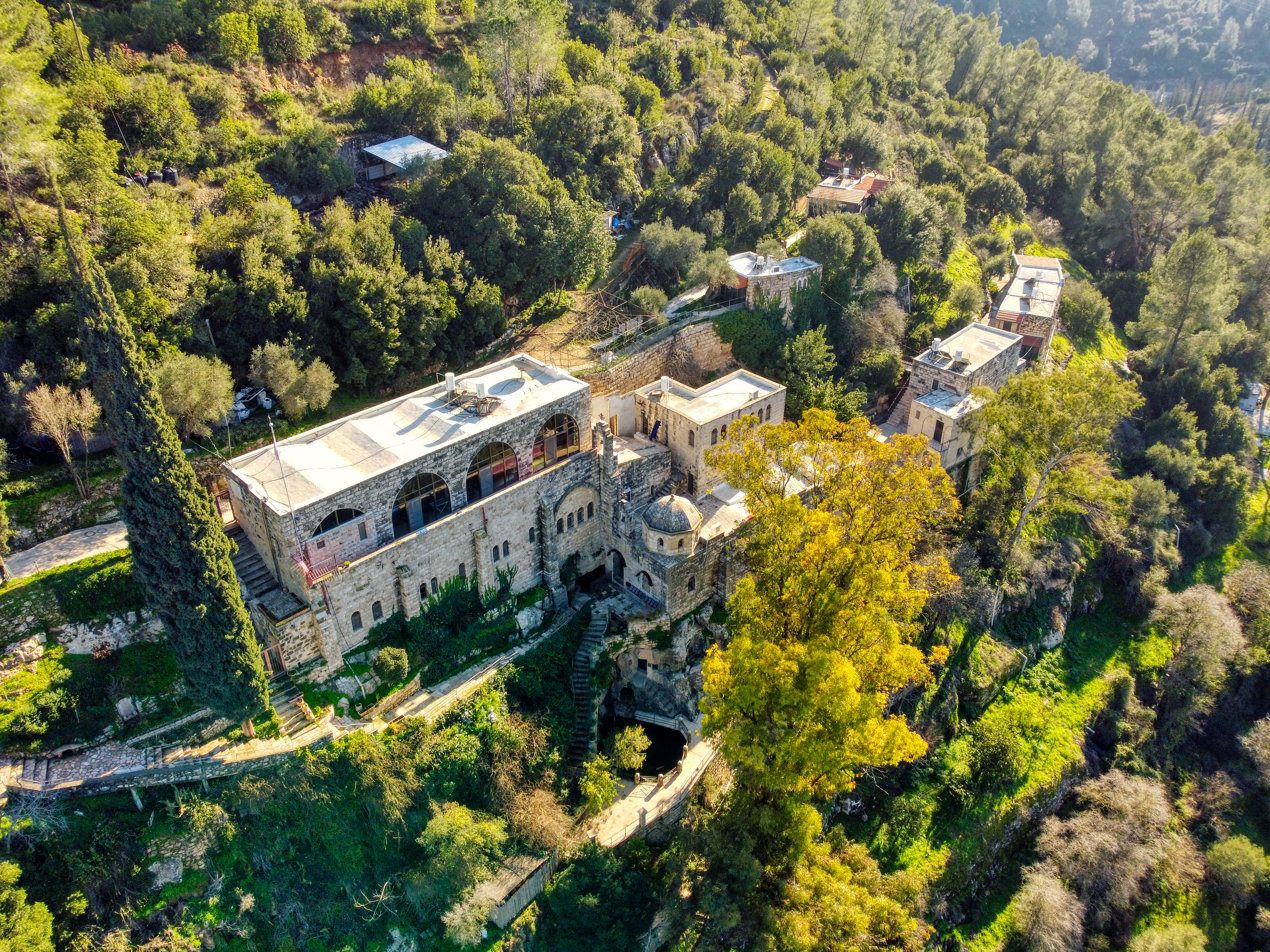
Monastery of Saint John in the Wilderness

== Description ==
The monastery has a church and is built next to the grotto in which St John is said to have lived, which now functions as a chapel. The monastery also contains the spring known in Arabic as ‘Ain el-Habis, 'spring of the hermit', and the tomb of Elizabeth, St John's mother.

== History ==
The Crusaders built here a church and convent.

In the Mamluk period, the church was in the hands of the Georgians. Franciscans paid the Georgians rent for the building and adjacent garden. The Georgians made a final attempt to regain the monastery by legal means in 1596.

The current monastery and its church were designed by Italian architect Antonio Barluzzi and were inaugurated in 1922. Barluzzi refused to take credit for the work, possibly due to him seeing it as simply a reiteration of the older structure.
