= Elizabeth, mother of John the Baptist =

Mother of John the Baptist

Saint Elizabeth
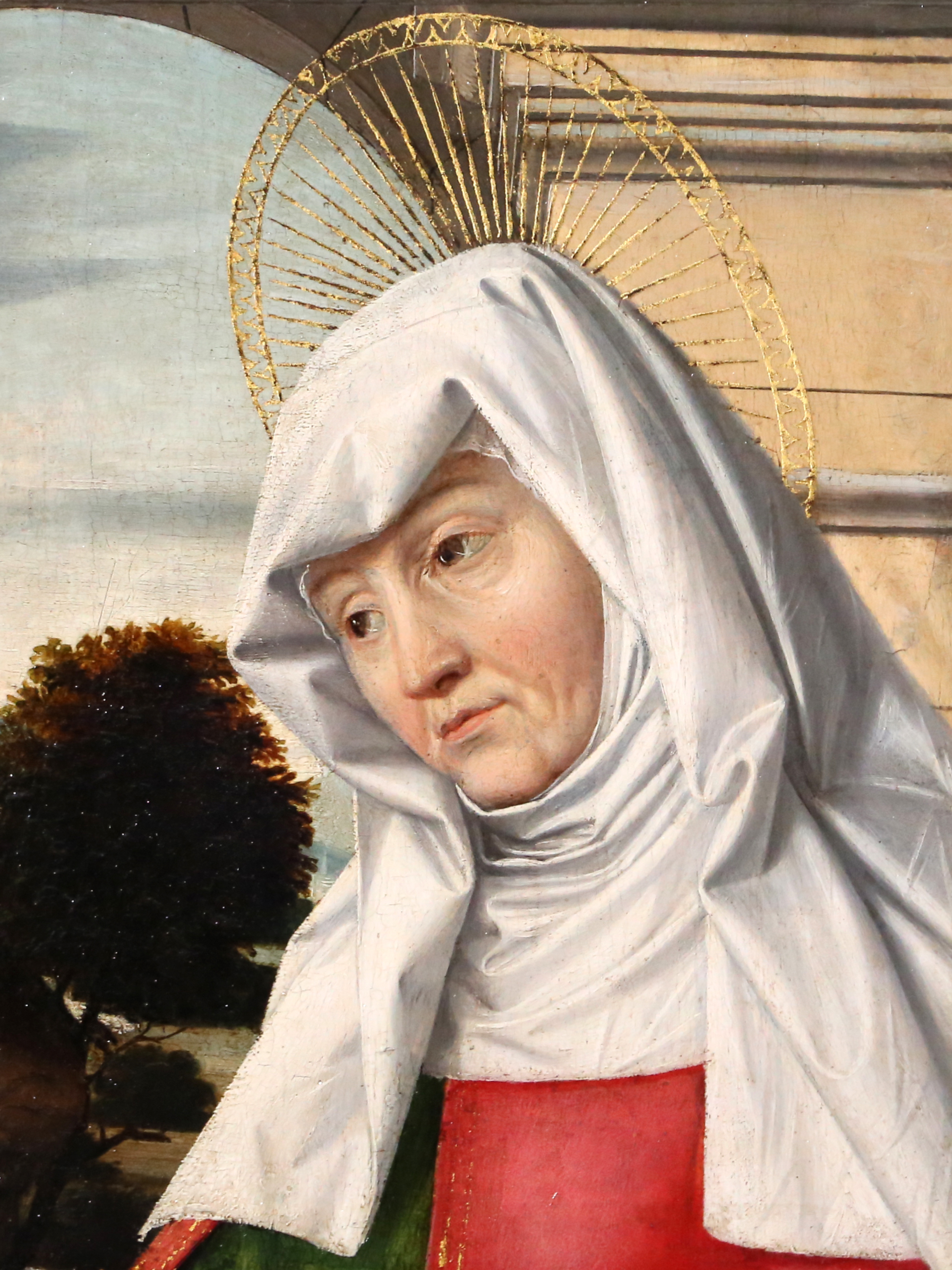
- Saint Elizabeth by an anonymous Provençal, late 15th century

Righteous
- Born: 1st century BC; One of the hills of Judea
- Died: 1st century BC (or early AD)
- Venerated in: Roman Catholic Church; Eastern Orthodox Church; Oriental Orthodox Church; Lutheran Church; Anglican Communion; Islam
- Canonized: Pre-Congregation
- Feast: 23 September (Roman Catholic, current), 5 November (Roman Catholic, older calendar); 5 September (Eastern Orthodox, Lutheran, Anglican)
- Patronage: Pregnant women

Elizabeth (Note: Also spelled Elisabeth; Hebrew: אֱלִישֶׁבַע, romanized: Elišévaʿ, lit. 'My God is abundance'; Ancient Greek: Ἐλισάβετ, romanized: Elisábet) was the mother of John the Baptist, the wife of Zechariah and a relative of Mary, mother of Jesus, according to the Gospel of Luke. She was past normal child-bearing age when she conceived and gave birth to John. She is revered as a saint by the Roman Catholic, Eastern Orthodox, Oriental Orthodox, and Lutheran churches, in addition to being a highly respected figure in Islam.

== Biblical narrative ==
According to the Gospel of Luke chapter 1, Elizabeth was "of the daughters of Aaron". She and her husband Zechariah were "righteous before God, walking in all the commandments and ordinances of the Lord blameless", but Elizabeth was barren and therefore they were childless. While he was in the temple of the Lord (1:8–12), Zechariah was visited by the angel Gabriel:

But the angel said to him: "Do not be afraid, Zechariah; your wife Elizabeth will bear you a son, and you are to call him John. He will be a joy and delight to you, and many will rejoice because of his birth, for he will be great in the sight of the Lord. He is never to take wine or other fermented drink, and he will be filled with the Holy Spirit even before he is born."

— Luke 1:13–15

The date on which this occurred, according to theologian Adam C. English, is September 24, based on computations from the Jewish calendar in accordance with Leviticus 23 regarding the Day of Atonement.

Zechariah doubted how the angel could know this since both he and his wife were old. The angel identified himself as Gabriel and told Zechariah that he would be "dumb, and not able to speak" until the words were fulfilled, because he did not believe. When the days of his ministry were complete, he returned to his house (Luke 1:16–23).

After this his wife Elizabeth became pregnant and for five months remained in seclusion. "The Lord has done this for me," she said. "In these days he has shown his favor and taken away my disgrace among the people."

— Luke 1:24–25

According to the account, the angel Gabriel was then sent to Nazareth in Galilee to her relative Mary, a virgin, betrothed to a man called Joseph, and informed her that she would conceive by the Holy Spirit and bring forth a son to be called Jesus. Mary was also informed that her "relative Elizabeth" had begun her sixth month of pregnancy, and Mary travelled to "a town in the hill country of Judah", to visit Elizabeth (Luke 1:26–40).

When Elizabeth heard Mary’s greeting, the baby leaped in her womb, and Elizabeth was filled with the Holy Spirit. In a loud voice she exclaimed: "Blessed are you among women, and blessed is the fruit of thy womb. But why am I so favored, that the mother of my Lord should come to me? As soon as the sound of your greeting reached my ears, the baby in my womb leaped for joy. Blessed is she who has believed that the Lord would fulfill his promises to her!"

— Luke 1:41–45

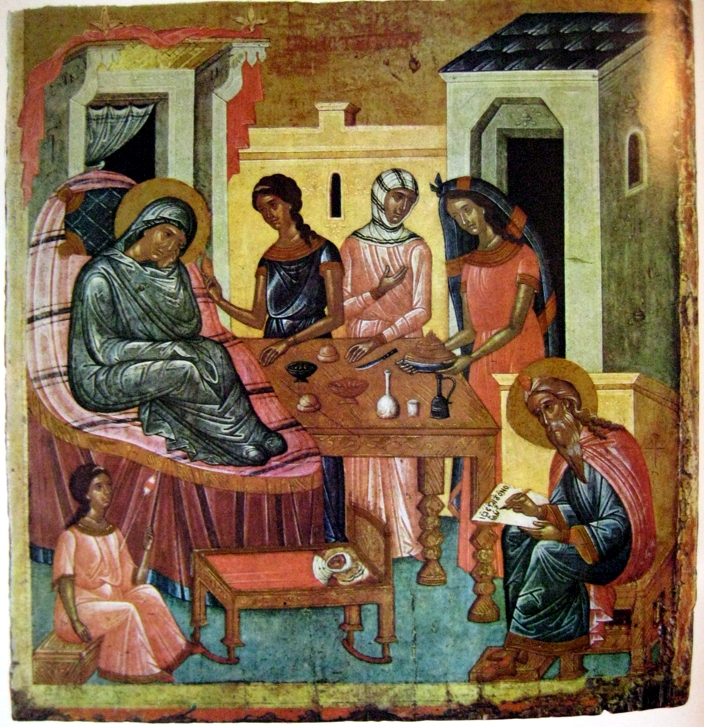
15th century depiction of the Nativity of St. John the Baptist, with Elizabeth on the left

Matthew Henry comments, "Mary knew that Elizabeth was with child, but it does not appear that Elizabeth had been told anything of her relative Mary's being designed for the mother of the Messiah; and therefore what knowledge she appears to have had of it must have come by a revelation, which would be a great encouragement to Mary." After Mary heard Elizabeth's blessing, she spoke the words now known as the Magnificat (Luke 1:46–55).

Mary stayed with Elizabeth for about three months and then returned home.
When it was time for Elizabeth to have her baby, she gave birth to a son. Her neighbors and relatives heard that the Lord had shown her great mercy, and they shared her joy.
On the eighth day they came to circumcise the child, and they were going to name him after his father Zechariah, but his mother spoke up and said, "No! He is to be called John."
They said to her, "There is no one among your relatives who has that name."
Then they made signs to his father, to find out what he would like to name the child. He asked for a writing tablet, and to everyone’s astonishment he wrote, "His name is John." Immediately his mouth was opened and his tongue set free, and he began to speak, praising God.

— Luke 1:56–64

That is the last mention of Elizabeth, who is not mentioned in any other chapter in the Bible. The chapter continues with the prophecy of Zechariah (known as the Benedictus) and ends with the note that John "grew, and became strong in spirit, and was in the deserts" until his ministry to Israel began; so it is unknown how long Elizabeth and her husband lived after that (Luke 1:65–80).

Since the Medieval era, Elizabeth's greeting, "Blessed are you among women, and blessed is the fruit of thy womb," has formed the second part of the Hail Mary prayer.

A traditional "tomb of Elizabeth" is shown in the Franciscan Monastery of Saint John in the Wilderness near Jerusalem.

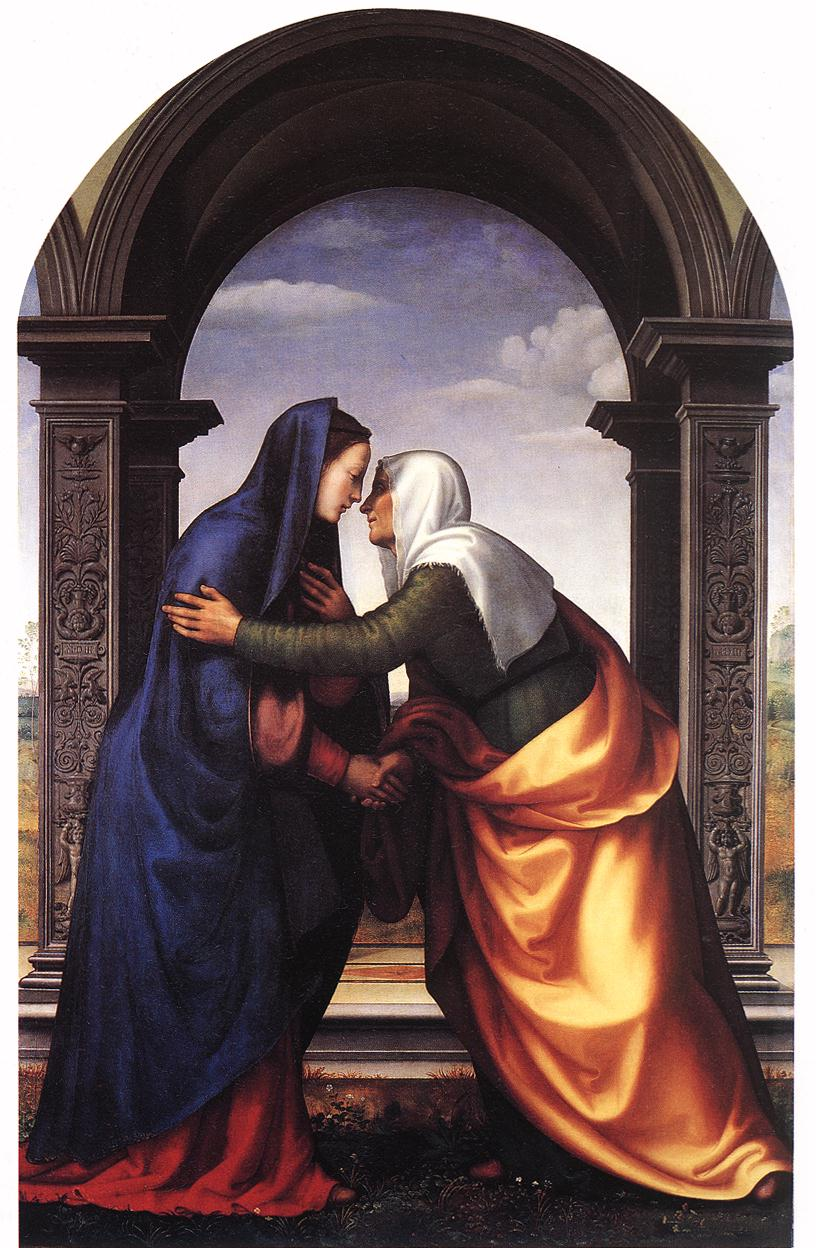
Mariotto Albertinelli's imagining of Elizabeth (right), here pictured with Mary

== Apocrypha ==
Elizabeth is mentioned in several books of the Apocrypha, most prominently in the Gospel of James, in which the birth of her son, the subsequent murder of her husband, as well as her and John's miraculous escape during the Massacre of the Innocents are chronicled.

== Sainthood ==
Elizabeth is revered as a saint in the Roman Catholic Church on 5 November, and in the Orthodox, Lutheran and Anglican traditions on 5 September, on the same day with her husband Zacharias/Zechariah. She is commemorated as a matriarch in the Calendar of Saints (5 September) of the Lutheran Church–Missouri Synod and Zacharias is commemorated as a prophet.

She is also commemorated on the Feast of the Visitation, commemorating Mary's visit to Elizabeth while both were pregnant. This feast is celebrated on 2 July in Western Christianity and on 30 March in the Eastern Orthodox Church.

== Islam ==
Elizabeth (Arabic: أليصابات), the wife of Zechariah, the mother of John the Baptist, is an honored woman in Islam. Although Zechariah himself is frequently mentioned by name in the Qur'an, Elizabeth, while not mentioned by name, is referenced. She is revered by Muslims as a wise, pious and believing person who, like her relative Mary, was exalted by God to a high station.

According to the Quran Zechariah and his wife were both devout and steadfast in their duties. They were, however, both very old and they had no son. Therefore, Zechariah would frequently pray to God for a son. This was not only out of the desire to have a son but also because he wanted someone to carry on the services of the Temple of prayer and to continue the preaching of the Lord's message to the children of Israel before his death. God cured Elizabeth's barrenness and granted Zechariah a son, John, who became a prophet. God thus granted the wishes of the couple because of their faith, trust and love for God. In the Qur'an, God speaks of Zechariah, his wife, and John, and describes the three as being humble servants of the Lord:

So We answered his prayer, granted him John, and made his wife fertile. Indeed, they used to race in doing good, and call upon Us with hope and fear, totally humbling themselves before Us.

— Surah Al-Anbiya 21:90

In Sunni Islamic reports of al-Tabari and al-Masudi, Elizabeth is said to have been a daughter of Imran, and thus, a sister of Mary. Therefore, their children Jesus and John are believed to have been cousins. In other accounts, Elizabeth is said to be a daughter of Fakudh, and a sister of Imran's wife Hannah.

In Shia hadith she is named Hananah, and is identified as a sister of Mary's mother Hannah. Abu Basir recorded that Imam Ja'far al-Sadiq, the great grandson of the Islamic Prophet Muhammad, had stated: "Anne, the wife of Imran, and Hananah, the wife of Zechariah, were sisters. He goes on to say that Mary was born from Hannah and John was born from Hananah. Mary gave birth to Jesus and he was the son of the daughter of John's aunt. John was the son of the aunt of Mary, and the aunt of one's mother is like one's aunt."

== Mandaeism ==
In Mandaeism, Enišbai (Classical Mandaic: ࡏࡍࡉࡔࡁࡀࡉ, romanized: ʿnišbai, Modern Mandaic pronunciation: [ʕiˈniʃβei]) is the Mandaic name for Elizabeth, the mother of John the Baptist. Enišbai is mentioned in chapters 18, 21, and 32 of the Mandaean Book of John.

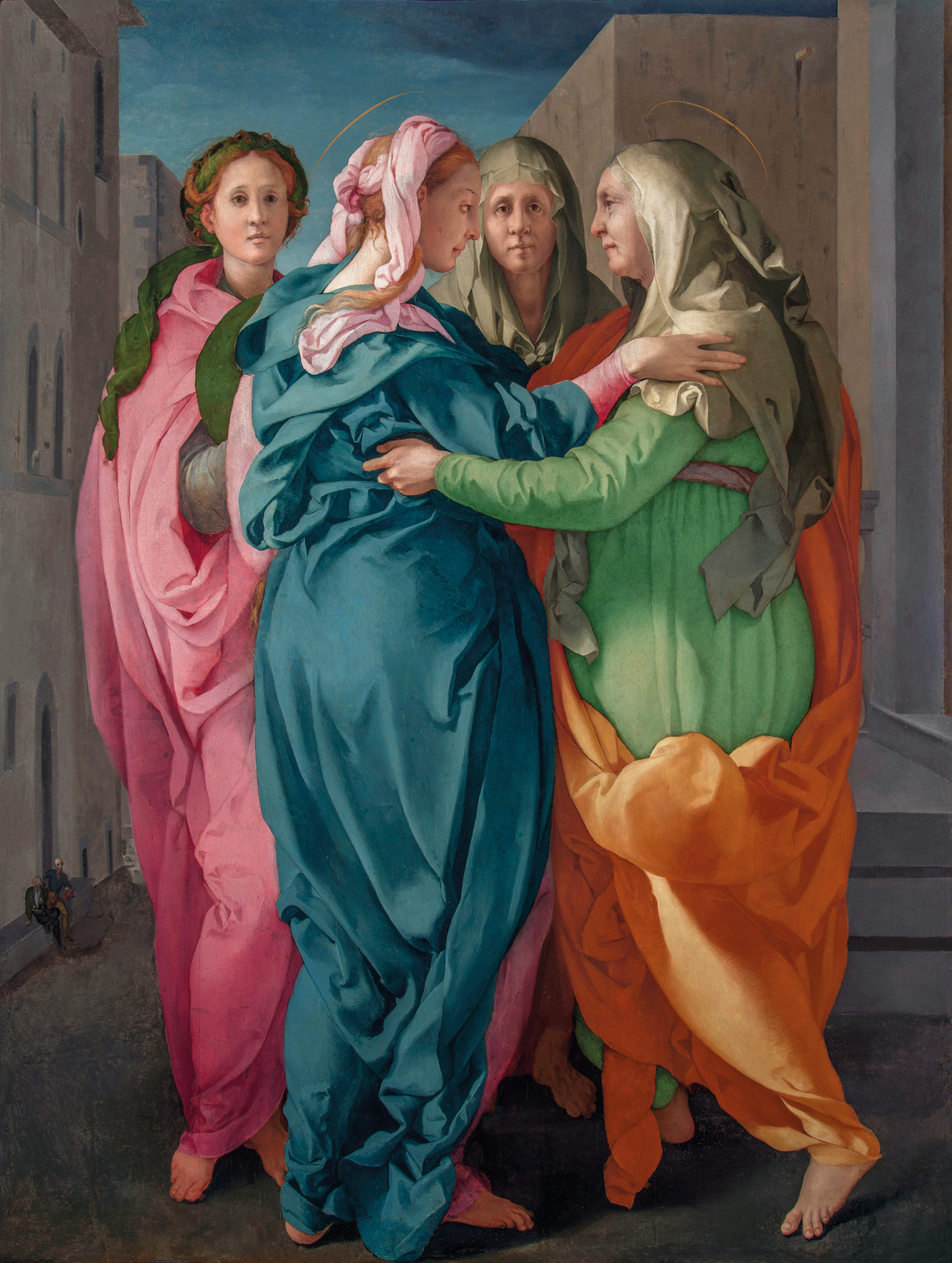
Jacopo da Pontormo, Visitation (1528–1529)

== In art ==
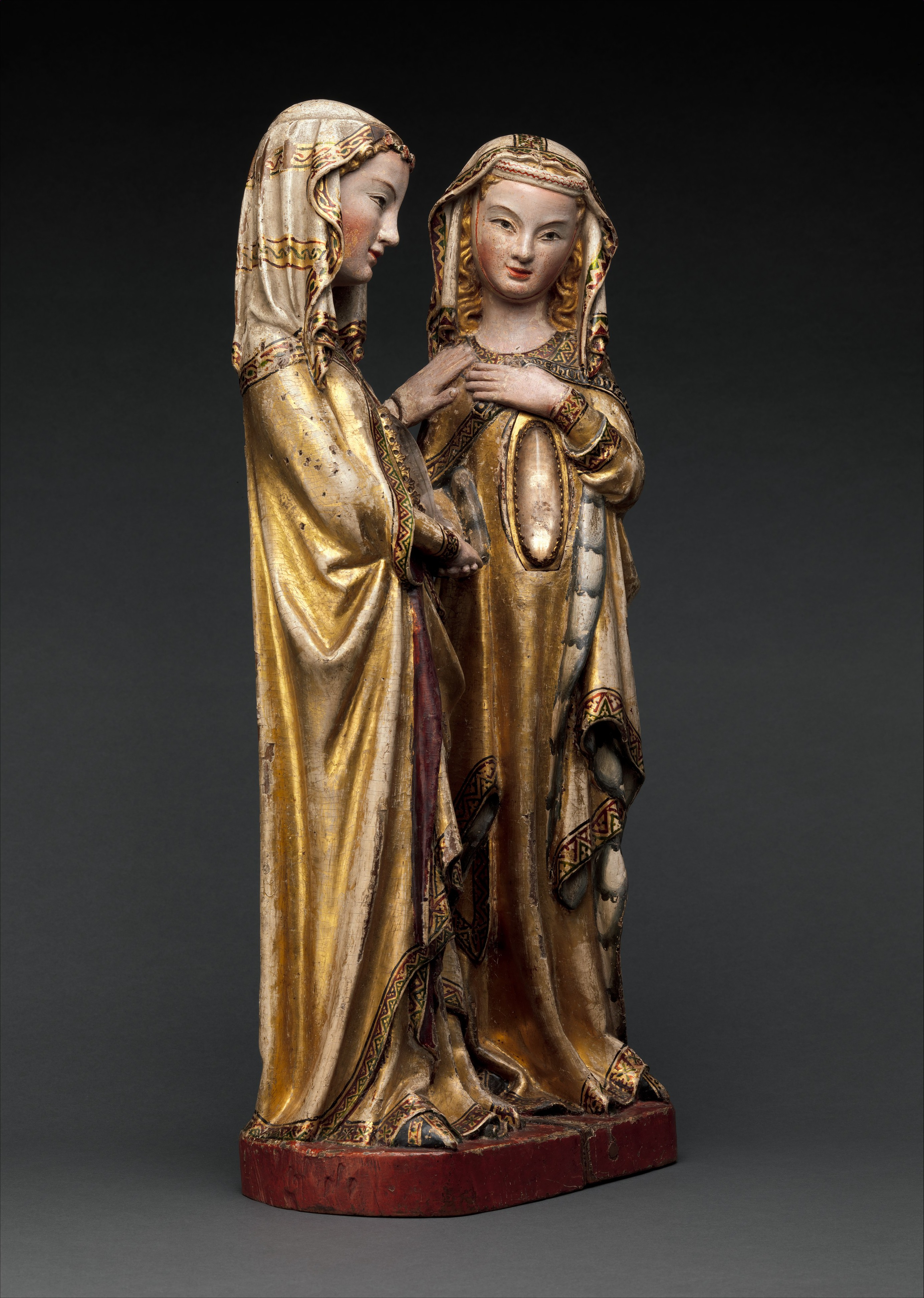
Master Heinrich of Constance, The Visitation (1310–20)

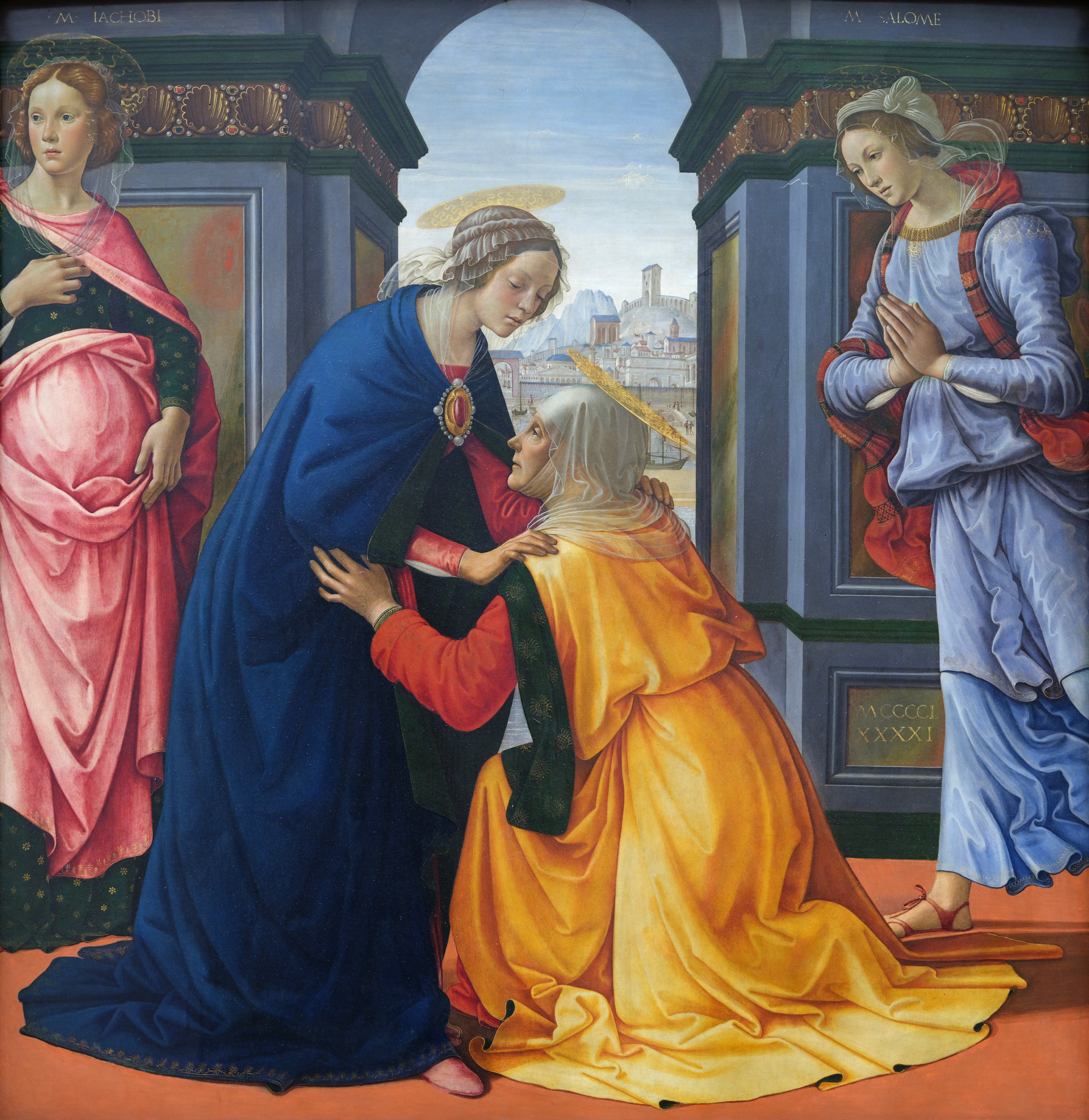
Domenico Ghirlandaio, Visitation (1491)

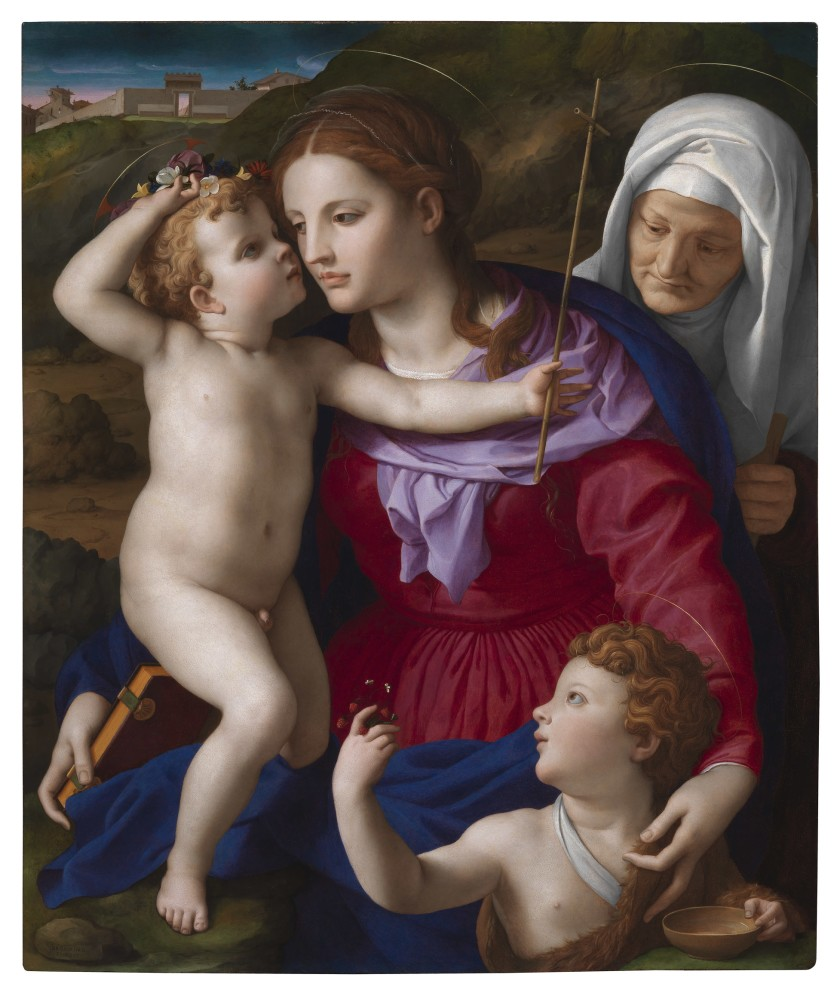
Agnolo Bronzino, Virgin and Child with Saint Elizabeth and Saint John the Baptist (1540–1545)

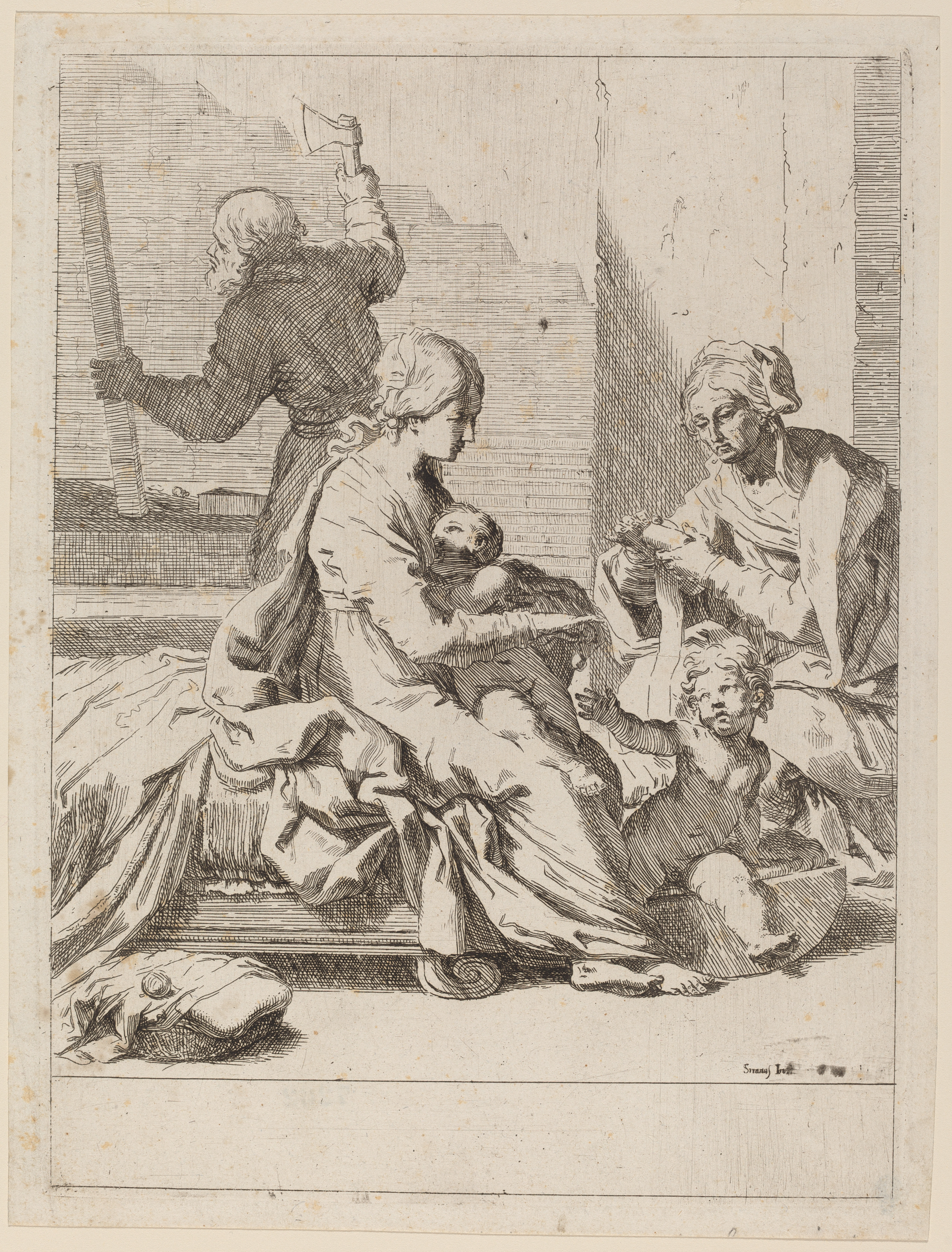
Elisabetta Sirani, The Holy Family with St. Elizabeth and St. John the Baptist (1650–1660)

== See also ==
- Gospel of Luke
- Visitation (Catholic feast)
- Ein Kerem, traditional home town of Elizabeth, Zechariah and John
- Biblical figures in Islamic tradition
- Saint Elizabeth, patron saint archive

== Notes ==
Elizabeth, mother of John the Baptist Life of Jesus
Preceded by The Annunciation	New Testament; Events	Succeeded by Birth of Jesus: The Nativity
