= Even Sapir =

Even Sapir: אבן ספיר (Hebrew)
- Moshav
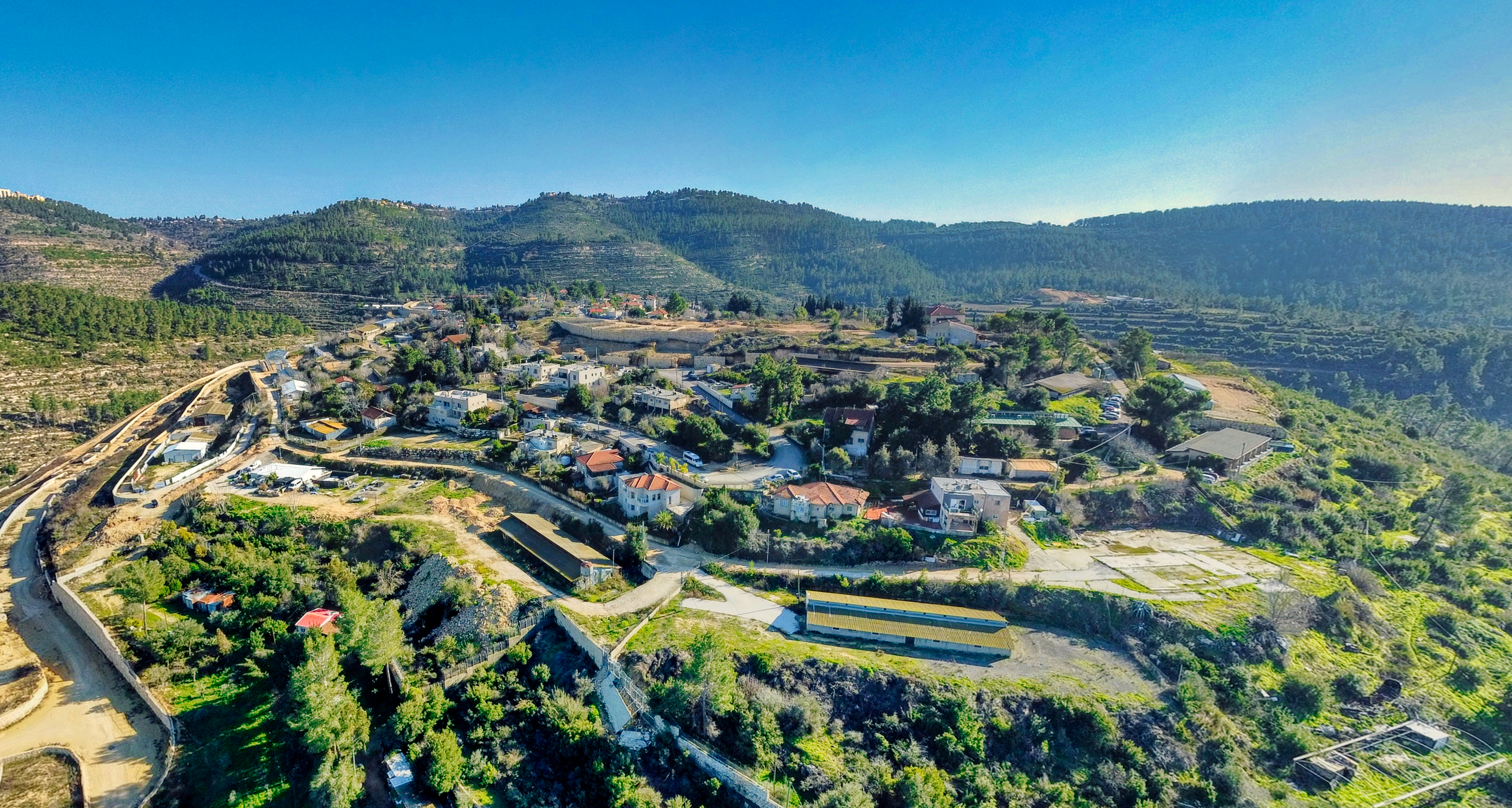
- Etymology: From a book by Jacob Saphir
- Location within Jerusalem District Location within Israel
- Coordinates: 31°45′47″N 35°8′5″E
- Country: Israel
- District: Jerusalem
- Council: Mateh Yehuda
- Affiliation: Moshavim Movement
- Founded: 1950
- Founder: Kurdish Jews
- Population (2024): 720

Even Sapir (Hebrew: אבן ספיר, lit. 'Sapphire Stone') is a moshav in central Israel. Located on the outskirts of Jerusalem, it falls under the jurisdiction of Mateh Yehuda Regional Council. In 2024 it had a population of 720.

== Etymology ==
The name was either taken from Even Sapir, a book written in 1864 by Jacob Saphir, a Jerusalem rabbi and emissary, which describes his travels to Yemen in the 19th century, or it was named after Pinchas Sapir, Israel's finance minister, who encouraged Jewish businessmen from the Diaspora to invest in Palestine and the nascent state.

== History ==
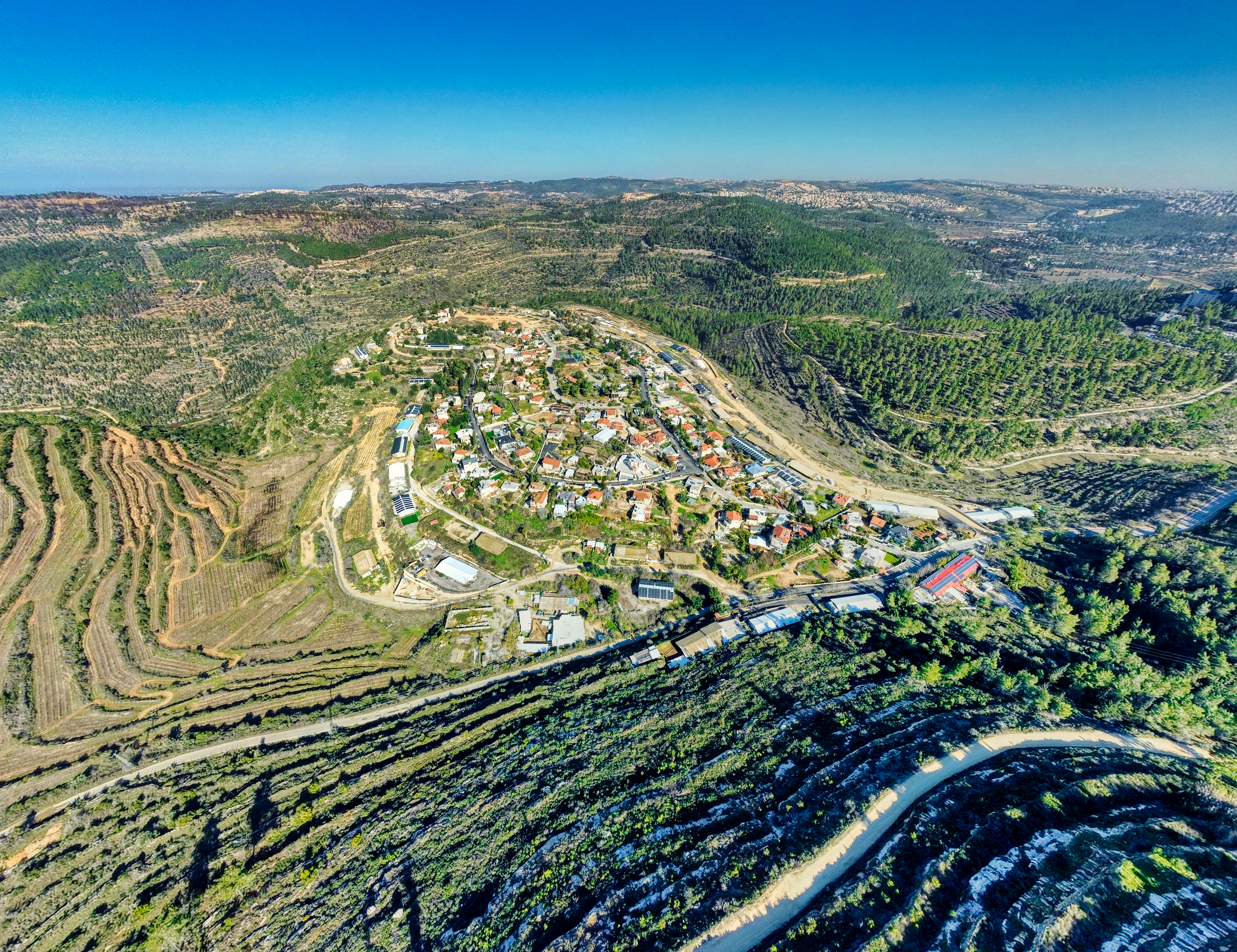
View of Even Sapir

Even Sapir was established in 1949 on land that had previously belonged to the depopulated Arab village of 'Ayn Karim before the 1948 Arab-Israeli War. The moshav was founded by Hebrew repatriants returning from Kurdistan.

To the north of the moshav is the Monastery of St. John in the Wilderness and a cave attributed to John the Baptist.

Even Sapir is one end point of the Jerusalem Trail, a 42-kilometer walking route around and through Jerusalem, which intersects with the Israel National Trail. The point of intersection is just outside Even Sapir at the Ein Hindak spring.

Even Sapir is a home to "Ben Gurion Institute of Science & Technology", Jerusalem Campus, a housing estate designated for 430 local and international students.
