= J. B. Tresch =

J. B. Tresch was a composer of choral works, although only a very limited repertoire survives today. Known works include Ave Maria, Sacerdotes Domini, a Jubiläum and an Offertorium. The style is classical and relatively simple, and clearly all the known works are sacred in nature. The Ave Maria is the most widely performed.

J.B. Tresch is likely Jean-Baptiste Tresch of Niederfeulen in the Eifel region of Luxembourg. He was born in 1773 and died in 1821, and attended Luxembourg college, a former Jesuit college in Luxembourg city.
