= Yakin =

The following people with the surname Yakin have articles:

- Yakin brothers, both Swiss footballers of Turkish origin
  - Hakan Yakin (born 1977)
  - Murat Yakin (born 1974)
- Abraham Yakin (1924–2020) Israeli painter
- Boaz Yakin (born 1966) American screenwriter and film director
- Hannah Yakin (born 1933) Israeli artist

== See also ==
- Yakeen (disambiguation)
