= Musée d'Art et d'Histoire du Judaïsme =

Musée d'art et d'histoire du Judaïsme (mahJ)
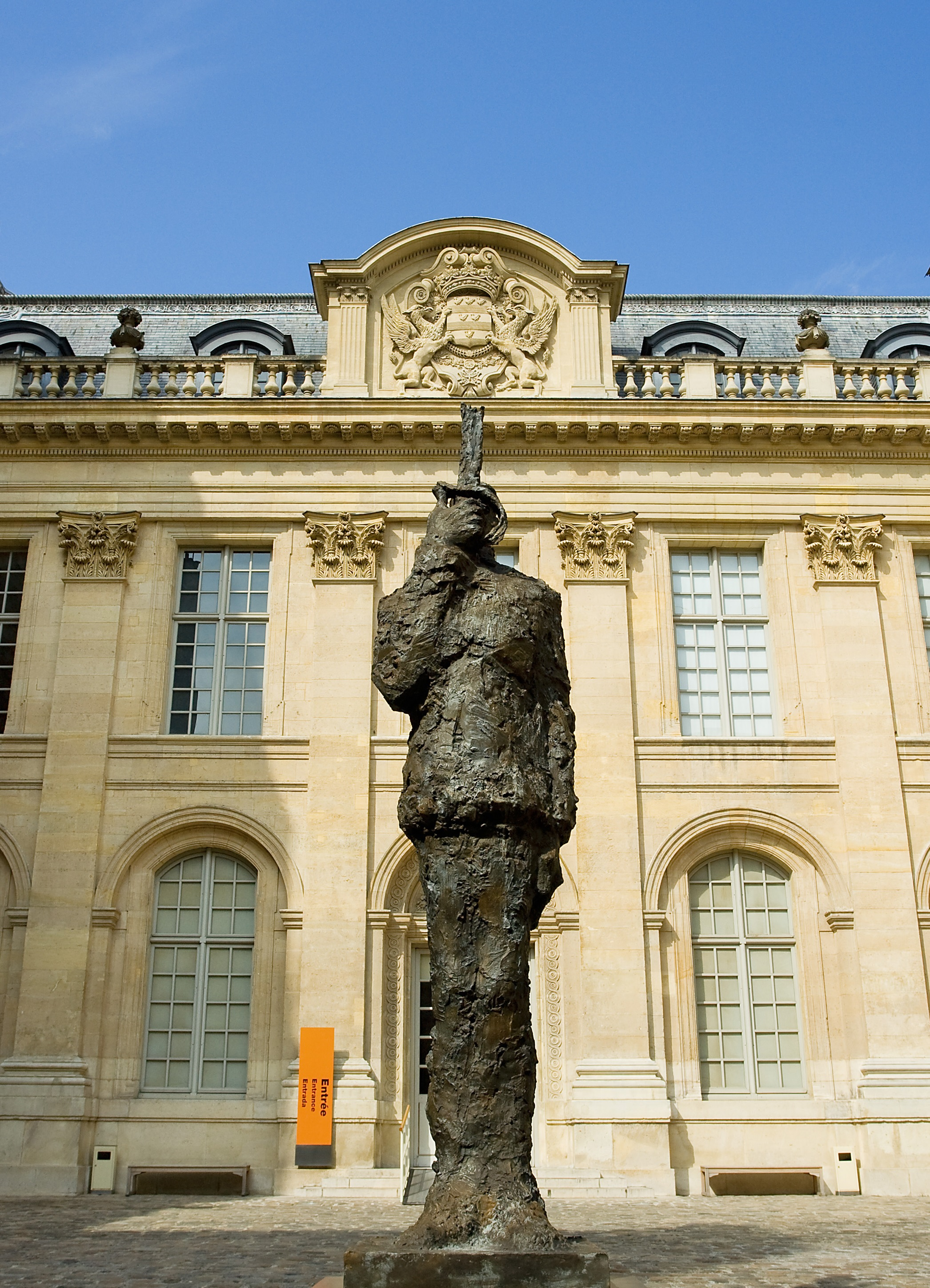
- The statue of Captain Dreyfus in the courtyard of the Hôtel de Saint-Aignan

- Location within Paris
- Location: 71 rue du Temple 75003 Paris
- Coordinates: 48.8611°N 2.35528°E
- Type: Jewish museum, Art museum, History museum, Historic site
- Director: Paul Salmona
- Public transit access: Rambuteau *Hôtel de Ville
- Website: www.mahj.org

The Musée d'Art et d'Histoire du Judaïsme (French pronunciation: [myze daʁ e distwaʁ dy ʒydaism], Museum of Jewish Art and History, abbr. mahJ) is the largest French museum of Jewish art and history. It is located in the Hôtel de Saint-Aignan in the Marais district in Paris.

The museum conveys the rich history and culture of Jews in Europe and North Africa from the Middle Ages to the 20th century. Its fine collection of religious objects, archives, manuscripts, and works of art promotes the contributions of Jews to France and to the world, especially in the arts. The museum's collections include works of art from Marc Chagall and Amedeo Modigliani. Its exhibitions have included works by artists such as Soutine, Frenel, Mane-Katz and others.

The museum has a bookshop selling books on Jewish art and history and Judaica, a media library with an online catalogue accessible to the public, and an auditorium which offers conferences, lectures, concerts, performances, and seminars. It also provides guided weekly visits in English during the tourist season (April–July) for individuals as well as students and teachers, and workshops for children, families, and adults.

== History of the museum ==
In 1985, Claude-Gérard Marcus, Victor Klagsbald, and Alain Erlande-Brandenburg launched a project to create a museum of Jewish art and history in Paris, backed by the City of Paris and the Ministry of Culture, represented by Jack Lang, Minister of Culture. The project had two goals: first, to provide Paris with an ambitious museum dedicated to Judaism and second, to present national collections acquired from the reserves of the national museum of the Middle Ages. At the time, only a modest museum devoted to Judaism existed in Paris, on the rue des Saules.

Starting in 1988, the project was led by Laurence Sigal. The mayor of Paris at the time, Jacques Chirac, provided the Hôtel de Saint-Aignan in the Marais as a site for the future museum. During the roundups of Jews in 1942 by the French Vichy government, several inhabitants of the building were arrested and deported. Thirteen Jewish inhabitants of the hotel were murdered in the Nazi death camps. In 1998, The Musée d’art et d’histoire du Judaïsme finally opened.

The decision to set up the museum in the Marais was a conscious one. Since the end of the 18th century, a large population of Jews has lived in the Marais. At first, these were immigrants from Eastern Europe, and later from North Africa during decolonization. Today, the Marais has been profoundly transformed: traditional shops have been largely replaced by trendy designer boutiques. However, the neighborhood is also a cultural center for museums such as the musée Carnavalet, the musée Picasso, and the Mémorial de la Shoah (Memorial for the Holocaust).

The two architects in charge of redesigning the interior of the building, Catherine Bizouard and Francois Pin, not only crafted the areas for the permanent collections but also created a media library, an auditorium, a bookshop, and an area dedicated to educational workshops.

The museum provides areas for temporary exhibitions, educational activities, and research, making it a dynamic and innovative cultural venue.

== History of the collection ==
The museum's permanent collection was assembled from three main sources.

The first is the Musée d’art juif de Paris, whose collection was donated. It consisted mainly of European religious objects, graphic works by Russian and German Jewish artists and artists from the School of Paris, and architectural models of European synagogues destroyed by the Nazis.

The second source is the Musée national du Moyen-Age in Paris, known as the musée Cluny. This collection was built up by Isaac Strauss, a French Jew from the 19th century. He collected 149 religious objects during his travels throughout Europe, including furniture, ceremonial objects, and Hebrew manuscripts. A Holy Arch from Italy from the 15th century, wedding rings, and illuminated ketubbot (marriage contracts) are examples of artefacts in his collection. Strauss is regarded as the first collector of Jewish objects. Part of his collection was displayed during the 1878 Exposition Universelle, provoking a strong interest. After his death, his collection was acquired by Baroness Nathaniel de Rothschild in 1890. She then gave it to the State to be donated to the Musée Cluny. Sixty six rare medieval funeral steles, discovered in 1894 rue Pierre-Sarrazin, are on a long-term loan from the musée Cluny.

Finally, the third source is a set of long-term loans from museums such as le Centre Pompidou, the Musée d'Orsay, the Musée du Louvre, and the Musée national des Arts d'Afrique et d'Océanie. The museum's collection was also enriched by loans from the Consistory of Paris, the Jewish Museum in Prague and donations from the Fondation du Judaïsme français. The museum also acquired a large photography collection. The collection has more than 1,500 photographs, mainly of Jewish communities from the past and present, of historical events, and of Jewish architectural heritage.

== Missions ==
=== Official missions ===
At its creation, the museum outlined five missions that it seeks to fulfill:

1. Present two thousand years of history of Jewish communities in France and contextualize them in the overall history of Judaism.
2. Conserve, study, diffuse, and promote the museum's collection, archives, and documents relating to Jewish history and art.
3. Make the collection as accessible as possible to a large public.
4. Organize the diffusion of all forms of artistic expressions relating to Jewish culture in all its diversity.
5. Create and execute educational operations, activities, and enterprises to promote Jewish culture.

=== Purposes ===
The mahJ chose a time period covering Jewish history from its beginnings in France until the birth of the State of Israel, without including the Holocaust. The project for the Mémorial de la Shoah, which is now located 800 yards from the museum, already existed when the mahJ was created, with the goal of commemorating the Holocaust. The mahJ and the Memorial complement each other. The museum explores Jewish history and identity without the memory of the Holocaust being the main element. The Holocaust is such a singular and momentous event that it can overshadow the rich heritage of Judaism outside of it, and deserves its own focused space.

Furthermore, the museum favors a historical approach to Judaism. The museum collection is organized in a chronological order and the works of art presented are always situated in their historical context. Differently from other European Jewish museums, the mahJ does not follow the phases of religious life. It is not a didactic presentation of the religious cycle in Judaism, and is neither a community nor a confessional museum, but instead shows the historical destiny of Jewish communities through time and space.

The museum also explores fundamental questions about Judaism and Jewish identity. Is Judaism a religion, the history of a particular nation, a culture or a civilization? Is there a unity that transcends the diversity within Jewish communities?

Finally, a considerable part of the museum's collection is made up of works of art from the Middle Ages to the beginning of the 20th century. Thus the question: What is Jewish art? Is it liturgical or religious art; art depicting Jewish themes and ways of life; or is it enough if the artist is Jewish?

== Key exhibits ==
=== Marc Chagall, The Gates of the Cemetery ===
Chagall's representation of a Jewish cemetery is part of a rediscovering of Jewish heritage by artists of the beginning of the 20th century. Chagall had recently discovered his grandfather's tomb: this painting is in part a reaction to this event. The artist associated the themes of death and resurrection through a quote from the prophet Ezekiel: "I will open your graves and raise you from your graves, O my people! And I will bring you back into the land of Israel." (Ezekiel, 37:12)

=== Medieval gravestones ===
The remains of a Jewish cemetery in Paris from the 13th century were discovered in 1849. A large set of exceptional gravestones that were found are now displayed in the room dedicated to French Jewry in the Middle Ages. They serve as a testimony to Jewish presence in Paris during the Middle Ages, despite many persecutions. All the gravestones are engraved with Hebrew inscriptions and are thus historical documents of a Jewish community.

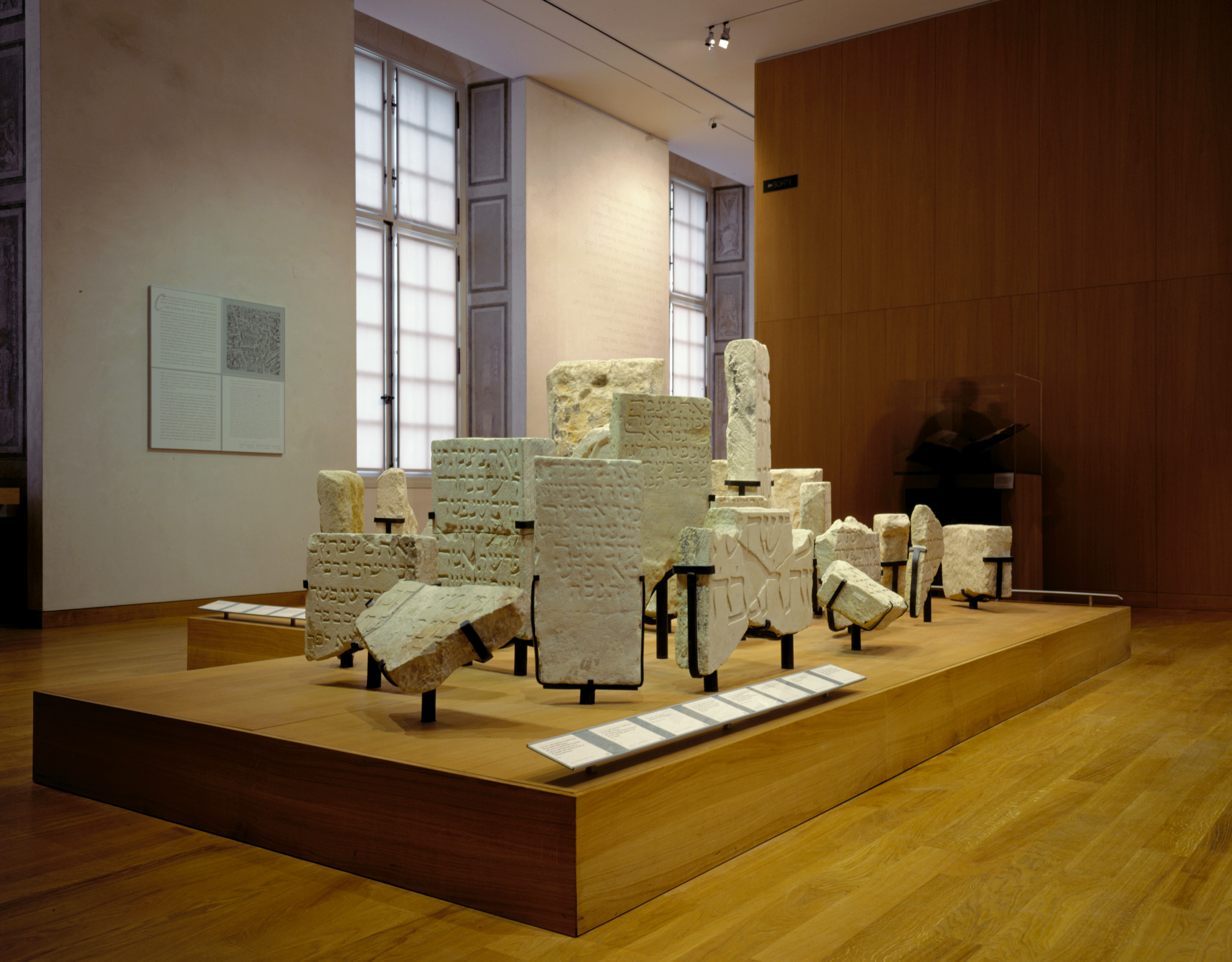
Medieval gravestones, Paris, 13th century, limestone, on a long-term loan from the Musée national du Moyen-age, Paris

=== Sukkah ===
This remarkably well-preserved sukkah of exceptional quality from the 19th century was used for the festival of Sukkot, one of the Three Pilgrimage Festivals. The panels are decorated with paintings of an Austrian village, the first few words of the Decalogue, and a view of Jerusalem.

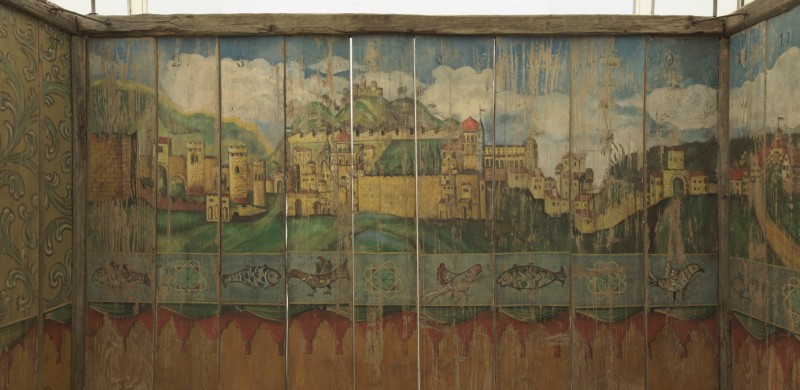
Booth for the feast of Tabernacles, Sukkah, Austria or South Germany, late 19th century, painted pine, 220 x 285.5 cm

=== Ceremonial dress ===
The Kswa el Kbirah, also known as "berberisca", is a bridal dress typical of the big coastal cities of Western Morocco. It is made up of three parts: the skirt, the bodice, and the embroidered bolero. Its design demonstrates the Spanish heritage that influenced the making of the costume. In many Moroccan families, the ceremonial dress is handed down from mother to daughter. Many similar costumes were donated to the museum by Jewish Moroccan families living in France after decolonization.

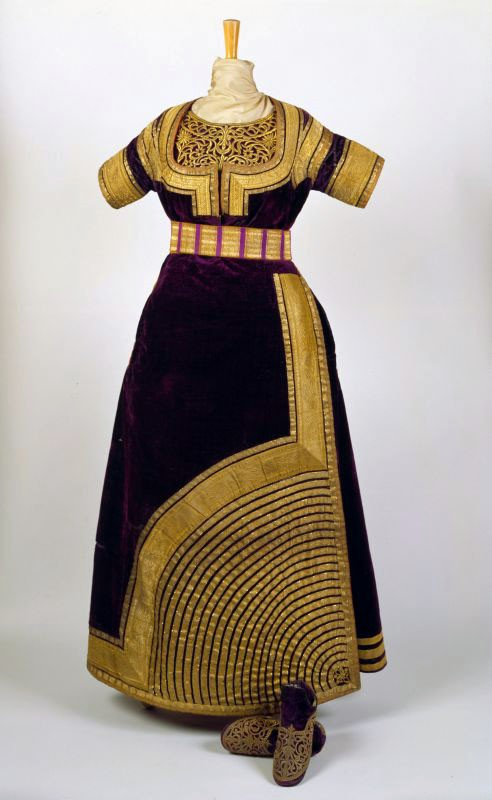
Ceremonial dress, Kswa el Kbirah, Tetuan, Morocco, late 19th century, silk velvet, gold braid, and lining of printed pattern, 111 x 329 cm

=== Holy ark ===
This piece from a synagogue in Modena, Italy, is the only Ashkenazi ark from the 15th century that has survived. Its structure and design are reminiscent of the shape of a fortified tower. A painted inscription reinforces this allegory: "The name of the Lord is a tower of strength where the righteous may seek refuge." It was probably made by the Italian artists Lorenzo and Cristoforo Canozzi. They excelled in the art of marquetry, which flourished during the Italian Renaissance. This Ark demonstrates the way Jews asked the most reputable artists of the time to execute synagogue furniture. (Proverbs, 30:10)

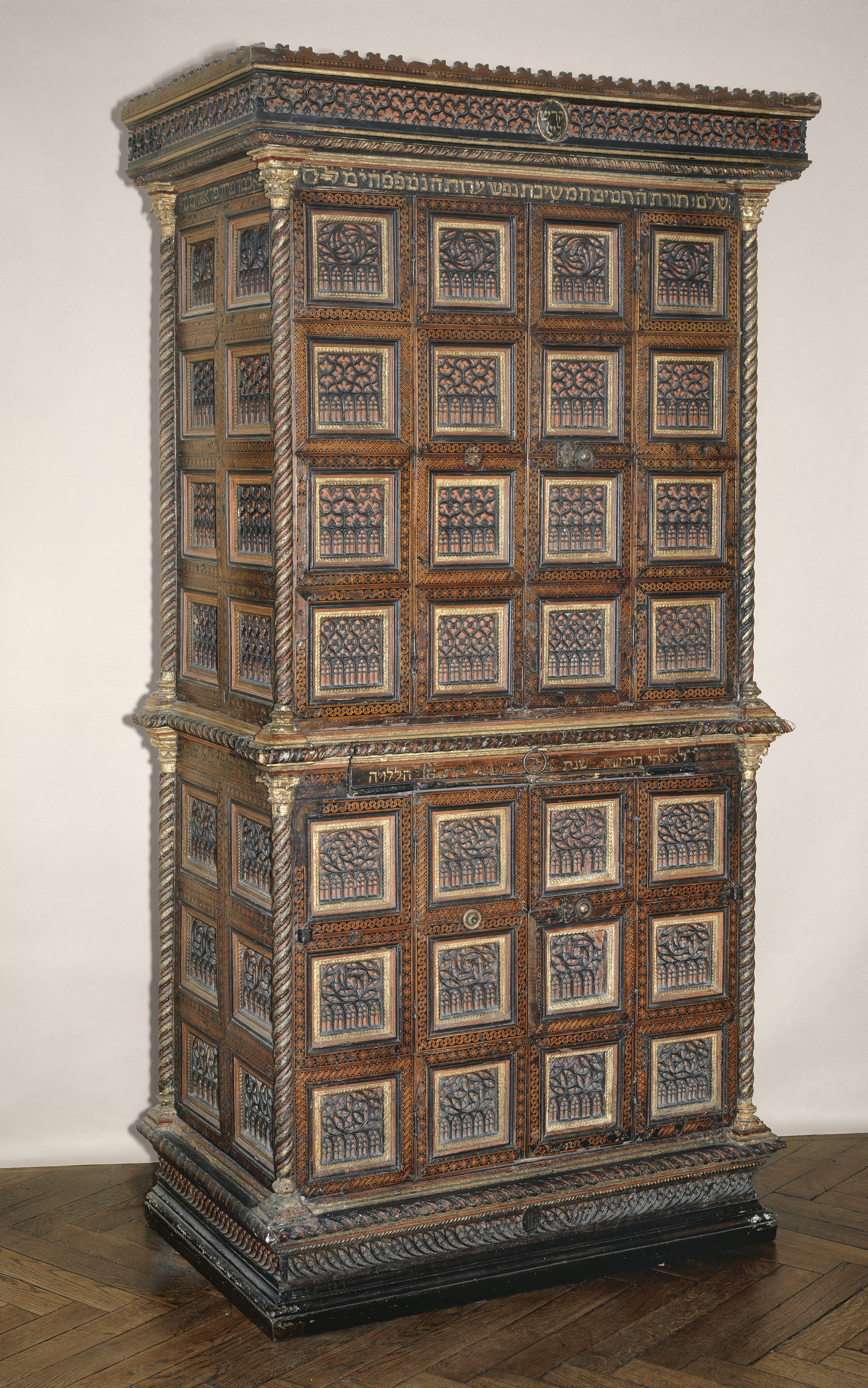
Holy ark, Aron ha-Kodesh, Modena, 1472, Carved and inlaid wood, 265 x 130 x 78 cm, On long-term loan from the Musée national du Moyen-Age, Paris

== Permanent collection ==
Each room of the permanent collection brings together three dimensions: a historical perspective of a certain time, a theme in some area of Judaism, and a specific place. The goal is to highlight the diversity and unity in rituals, beliefs, art, and material culture of Jewish communities in Europe and North Africa.

The situation of Jews in France is original because both Ashkenazi and Sephardic Jews coexist and the two traditions mingle.

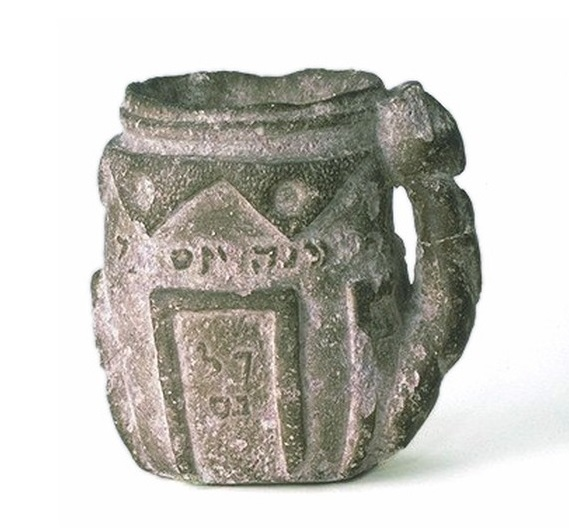
Alm box for the festival of Purim, Spain, 1319, carved stone, 13,2 x 12.5 cm

=== Introductory room ===
The visit begins with a presentation of symbolic objects and fundamental documents to show the permanence of Jewish identity and civilization in spite of- and through- the diaspora.

=== French Jews in the Middle Ages ===
French Jewry had a rich cultural life in the Middle Ages, as witnessed by the work of Jewish thinkers such as Rashi, a rabbi from the 11th century. In 1306, Philippe Le Bel made an edict expelling Jews from France, and in 1394 Charles VI banned them completely. The central exhibit of the room is a collection of gravestones from a 13th-century Jewish cemetery in Paris. These gravestones have exceptional value, as they are the largest archeological set ever discovered on French soil. At the far end, valuable manuscripts are displayed in a presentation counter. Four rare ritual objects dating from the period before the Jews' expulsion from France illustrate the depth of medieval Jewish life. The visitor sees how communities were organized, how knowledge was shared in networks, and how Jews were present in the Christian world.

=== The Jews in the Italian Renaissance ===
During the Renaissance up until the 19th century, Italy was not a unified country, so the life and presence of Jews was different in every region. This room shows the cultural splendor of certain cities, such as Modena and Venice. It is devoted to synagogue furnishings, including a rare Holy Ark from Modena in Italy, silverware, and liturgical embroideries from the Italian Jewish world. These beautiful objects show the refinement of Italian art in the Renaissance. Jewish life cycle events – birth, circumcision, bar mitzvah, and marriage – are illustrated by objects, jewelry, and manuscripts. Illuminated marriage contracts (ketubbot) are displayed in frames. Several paintings from the 18th century, attributed to Marco Marcuola, depict religious scenes from Jewish life in Venice. A 1720 masterpiece by Alessandro "il Lissandrino" Magnasco depicts a Jewish funeral in late-Baroque style. The painting is extremely expressive and tormented, but doesn't lack realism as certain details accurately represent Jewish customs. Magnasco was very interested in Jewish subjects, and especially depicted many synagogues in his work.

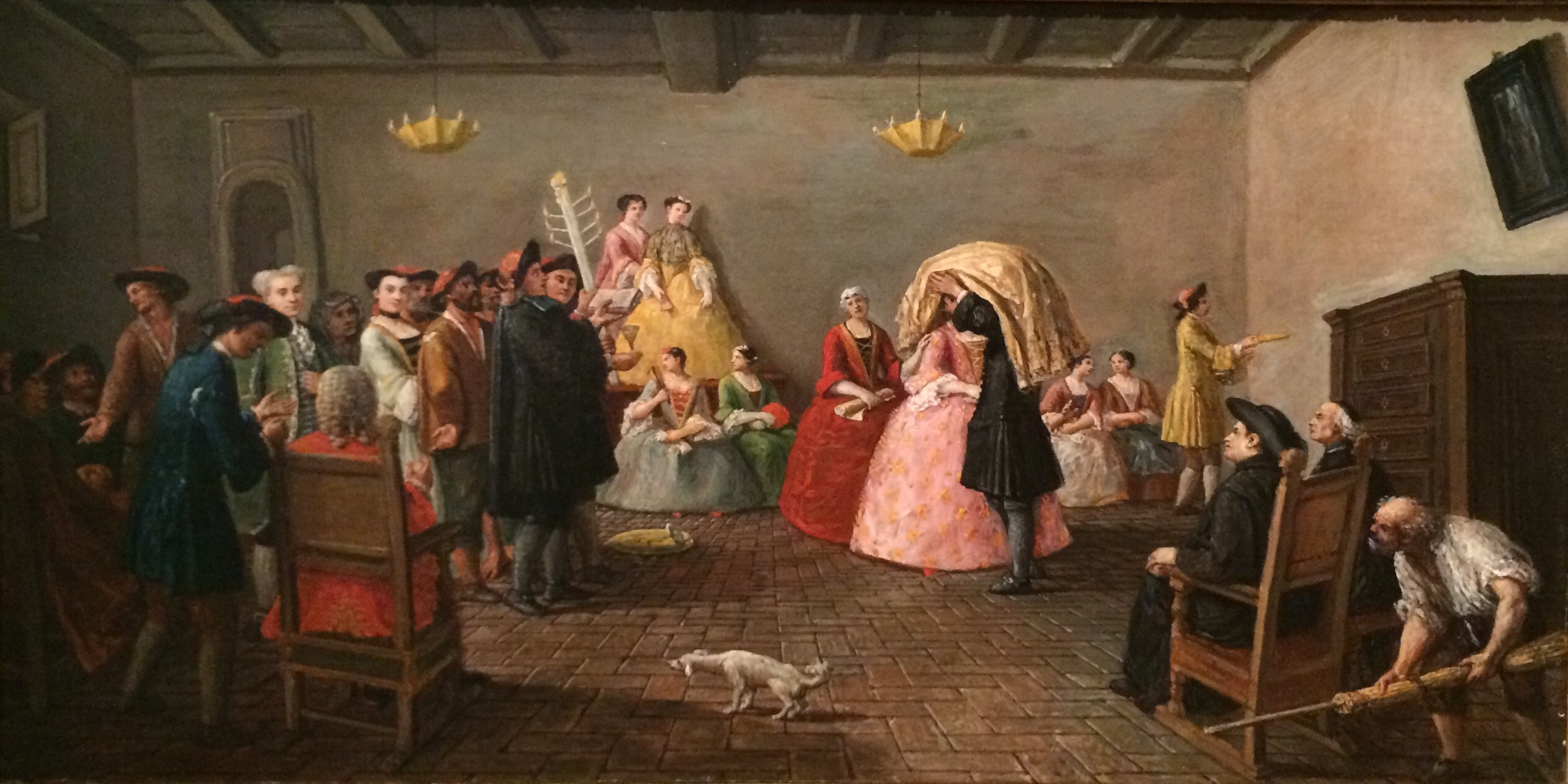
Jewish Wedding, Marco Marcuola, Venice, around 1780

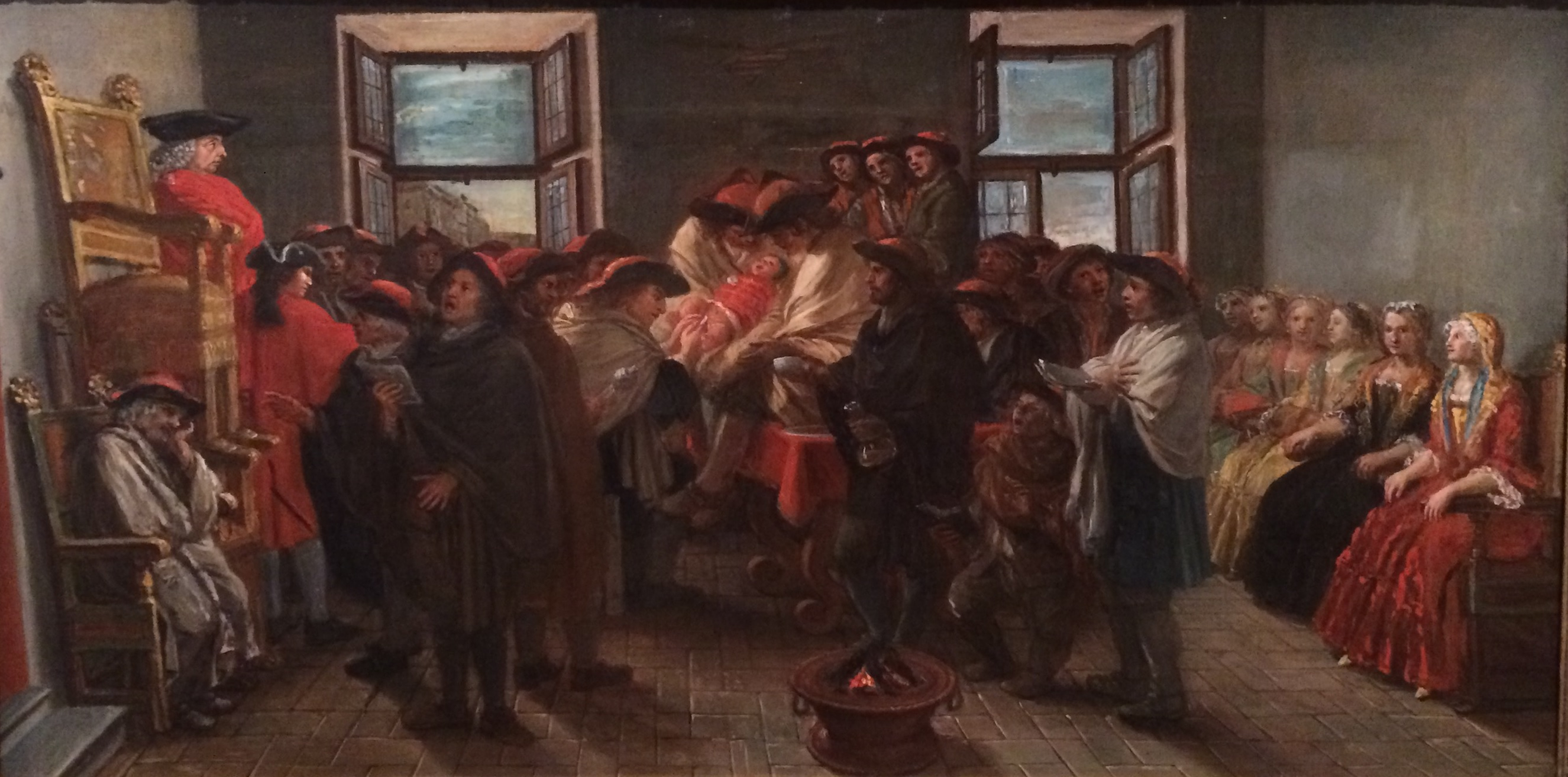
A circumcision, Marco Marcuola, Venice, around 1780

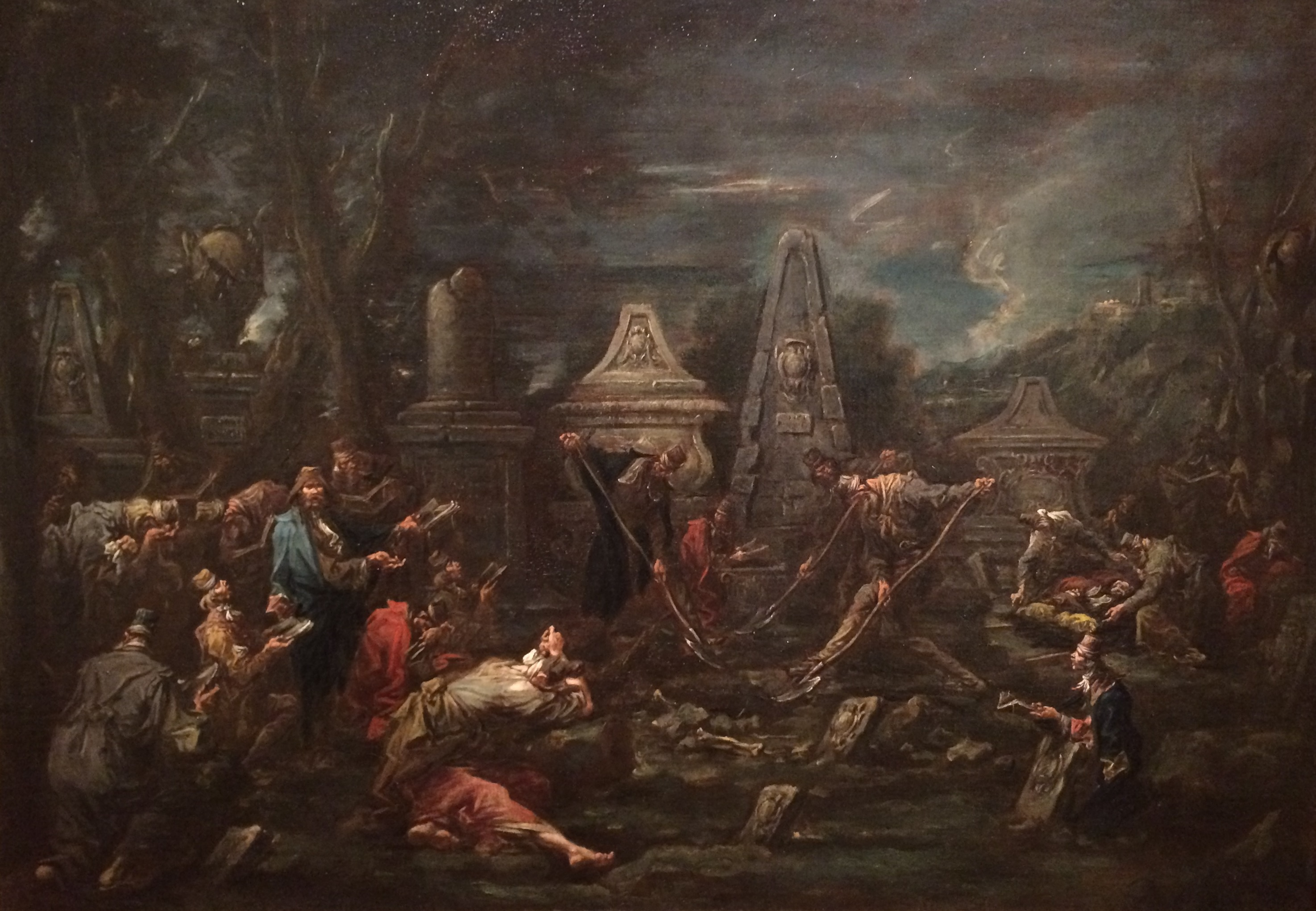
Jewish Funeral, Alessandro Magnasco, oil on canvas, Genoa, around 1720

=== Hanukkah ===
An entire room is dedicated to the holiday of Hanukkah. It displays an exceptional collection of Hanukkiyot, in a variety of shapes and designs, from various origins and periods. This panorama is "a metaphor for the dispersion of Jews around the world and their anchoring in dominant cultures."

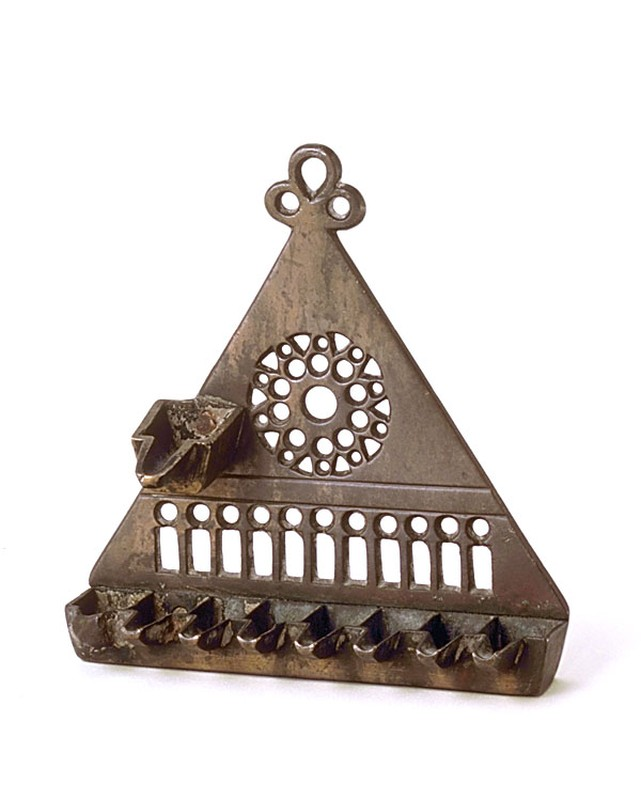
France, 14th century

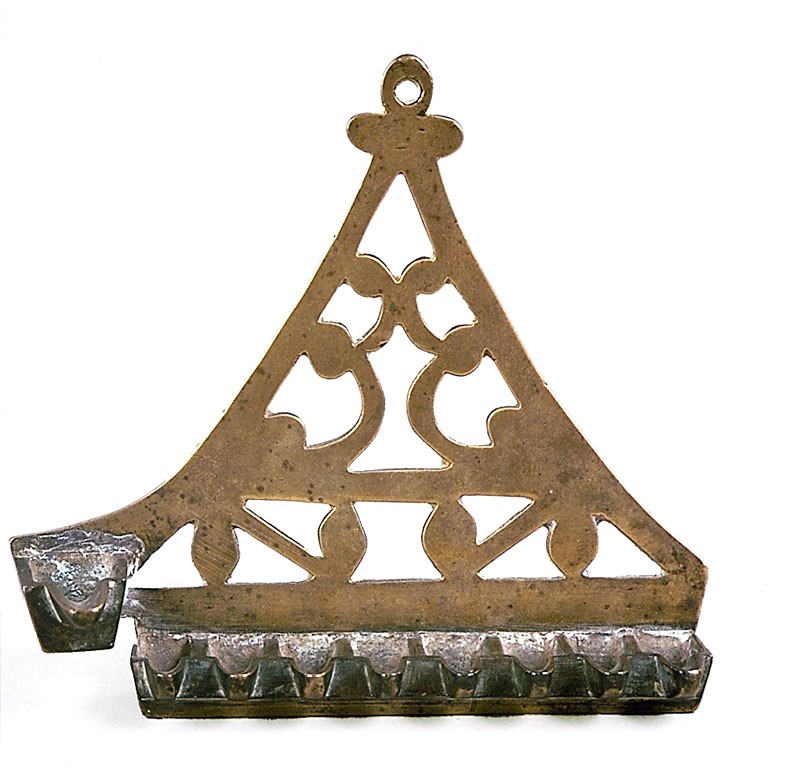
France, 16th century

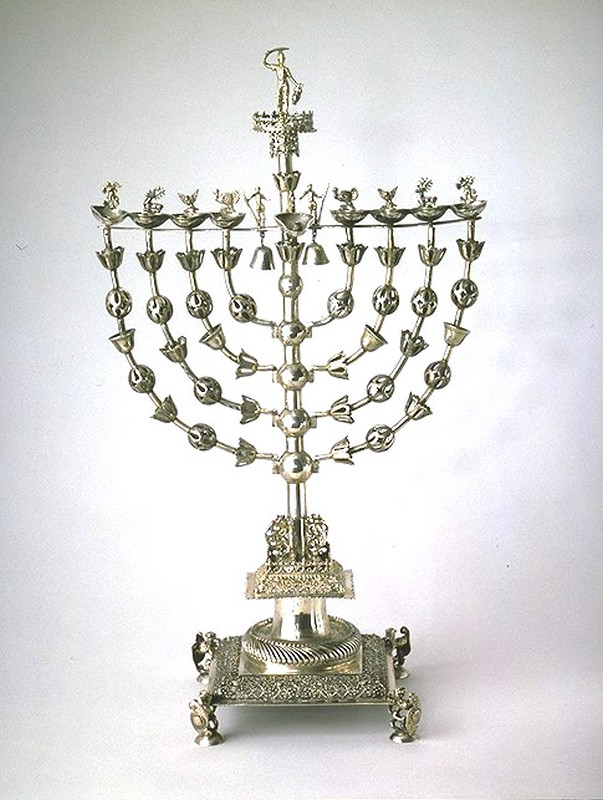
Germany, 17th century

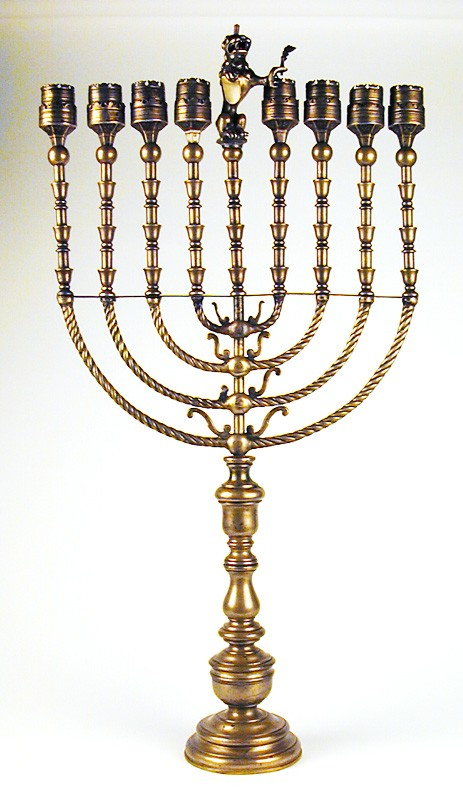
Italy, 18th century

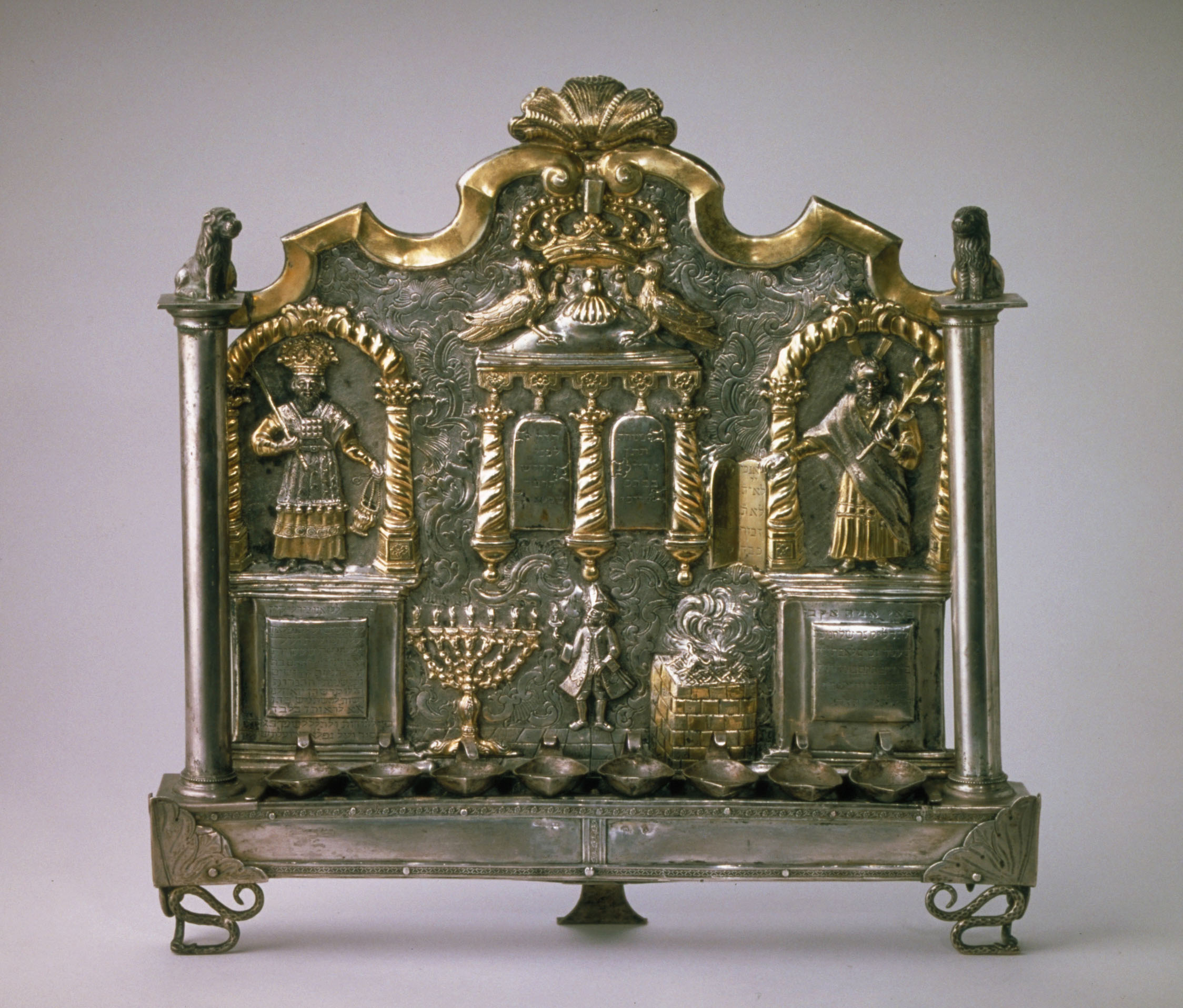
Poland, 18th century

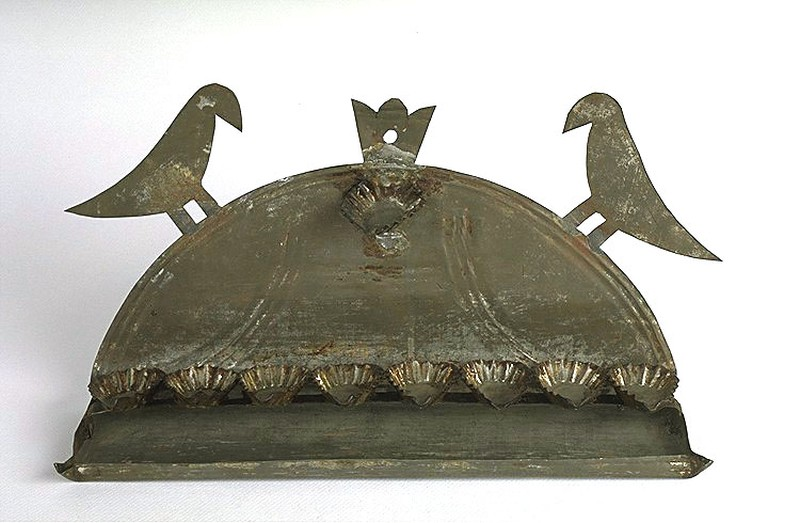
France, 19th century

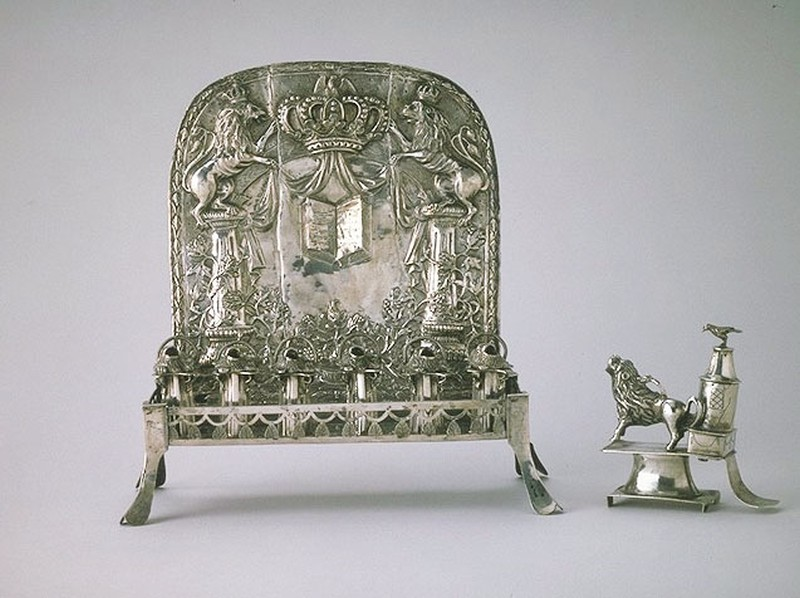
Europe, 19th century

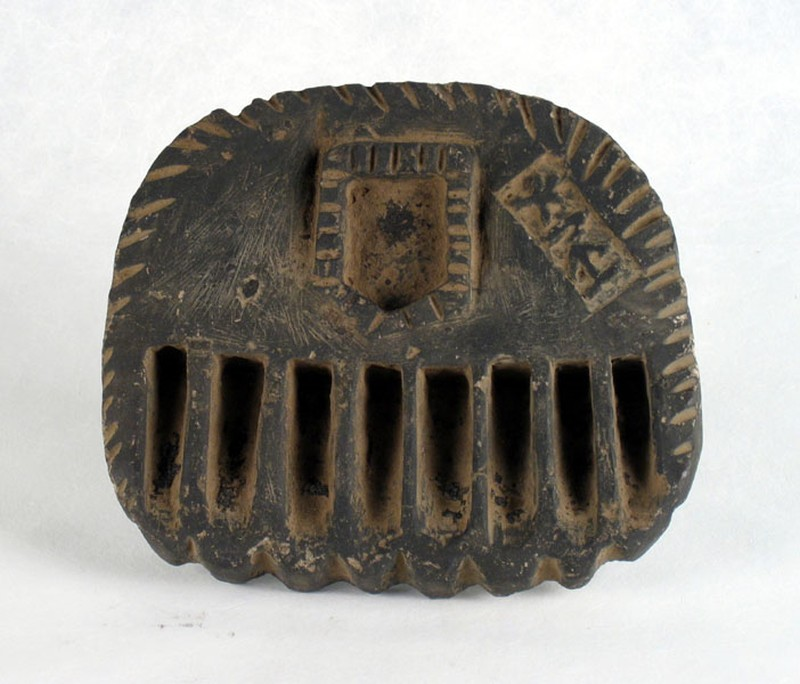
Yemen, 20th century

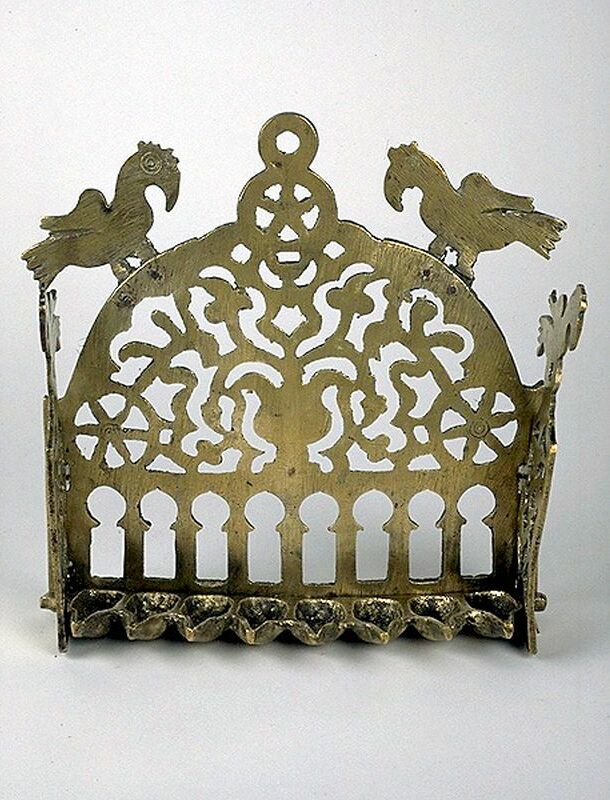
Tunisia, 20th century

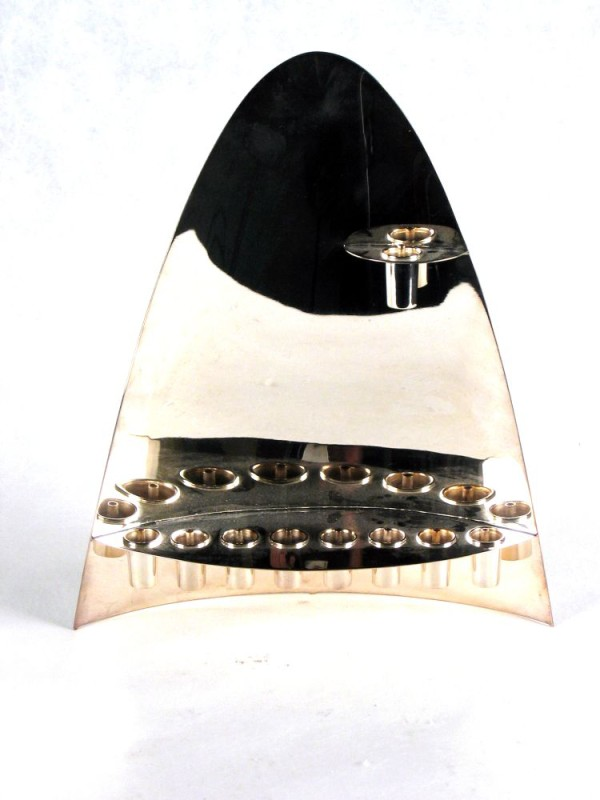
Israel, 20th century

=== Amsterdam: the meeting of two diasporas ===
A small collection of 17th and 18th century Dutch engravings represent the wanderings of Spanish Jews after the expulsion from Spain. It includes a lovely series by Bernard Picart entitled Ceremonies and Religious Customs of all Peoples of the World and shows how Portuguese Jews integrated into the communities in Amsterdam, London, and Bordeaux after their expulsion in 1496/97. This area focuses on the importance of relationships between communities. Finally, a display case showcases the development of Hebrew printing through rare books which are printing press masterpieces.

=== Next year in Jerusalem ===
One of the museum's central pieces is a completely restored 19th century Sukkah from Austria decorated with places that matter in Judaism, such as the Old City in Jerusalem. Along with other ritual objects and texts, it depicts the Three Pilgrimage Festivals - Pesach, Shavuot, and Sukkot -, and highlights the central place that Jerusalem occupies in Jewish consciousness.

=== The Ashkenazi world ===
Several scale models of synagogues from Eastern Europe, most of which were destroyed by the Nazis, remind us of a world that has now disappeared. A haunting painting entitled Jewish Cemetery (1892) by Samuel Hirszenberg depicts the difficult living conditions of Jewish communities in Poland and Russia caused by the pogroms at the end of the 19th century. Two paintings by Marc Chagall bring to life the existence of Jews in the shtetls. The display cases exhibit works around the theme of Shabbat, prayer, and liturgy. They provide a brief overview of religious study and movements of religious thought in the 19th century. In addition, an exceptional collection of mappot, linen sashes used to swaddle a baby boy when he is circumcised, is displayed. Mappot were exclusively used in Eastern France.

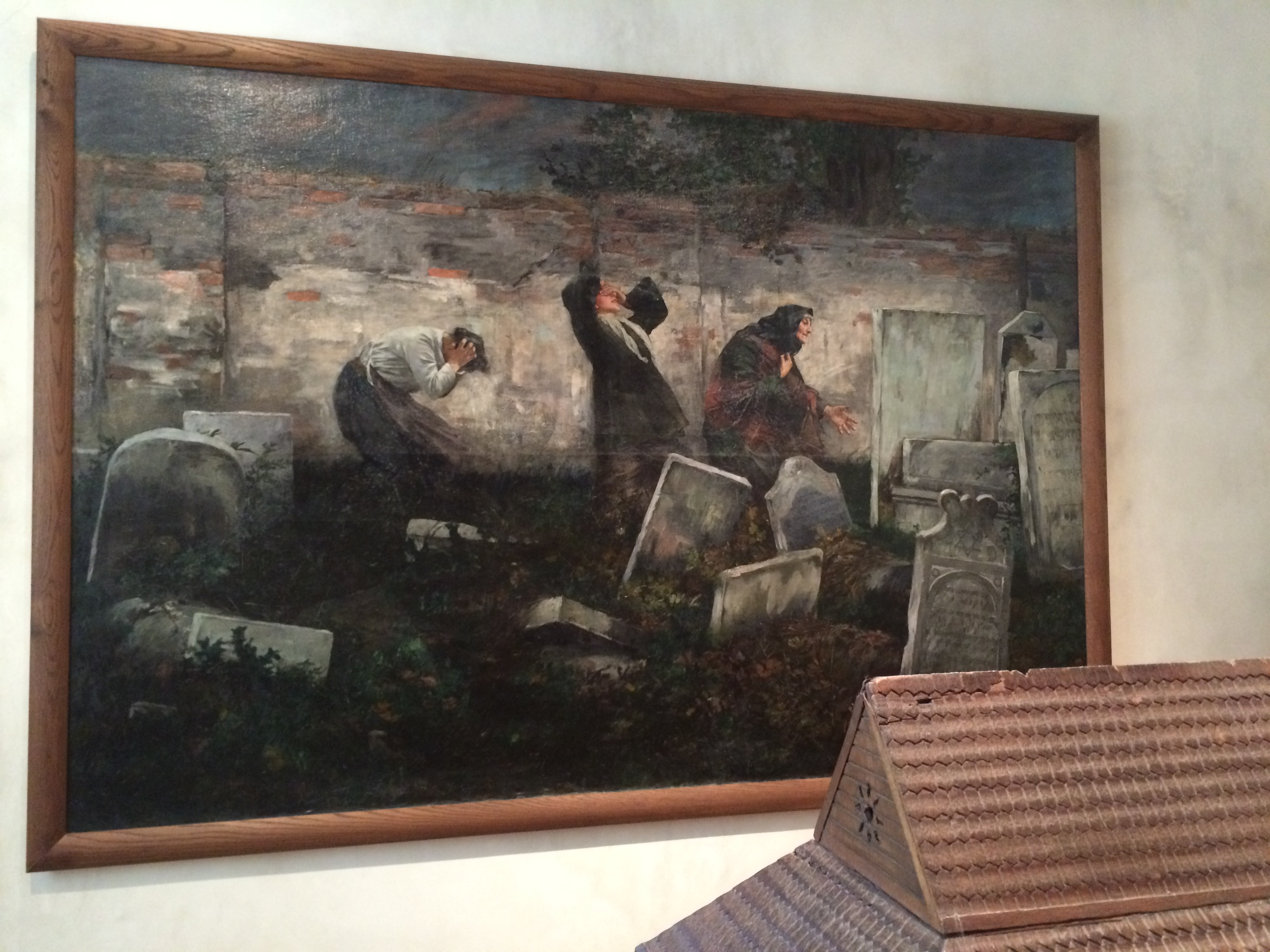
Jewish Cemetery, Samuel Hirszenberg (1892)

=== The Sephardic world ===
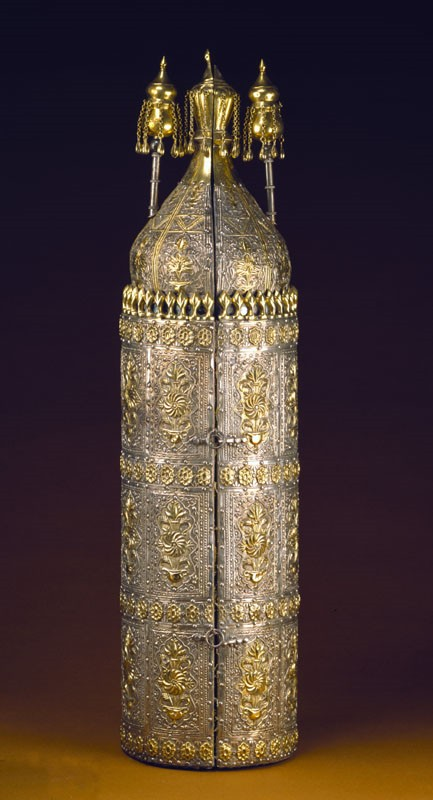
Silver Torah case and Torah scroll, Ottoman Empire, 1860

The Sephardic collection touches on the same themes evoked in the Ashkenazi collection to show the kinship and contrasts between the two traditions.

The geographical contrasts in religious customs among Sephardic Jews are highlighted through a variety of textiles, synagogue silverware, ordinary domestic objects, and popular art.

The collection contains a wide range of ethnographic objects illustrating the wealth of traditions and family ceremonies and the opulent costumes of Jews of the Maghreb, the Ottoman Empire, and the Middle East. Orientalist paintings and engravings, as well as old photographs, complete this journey among the communities of the Diaspora.

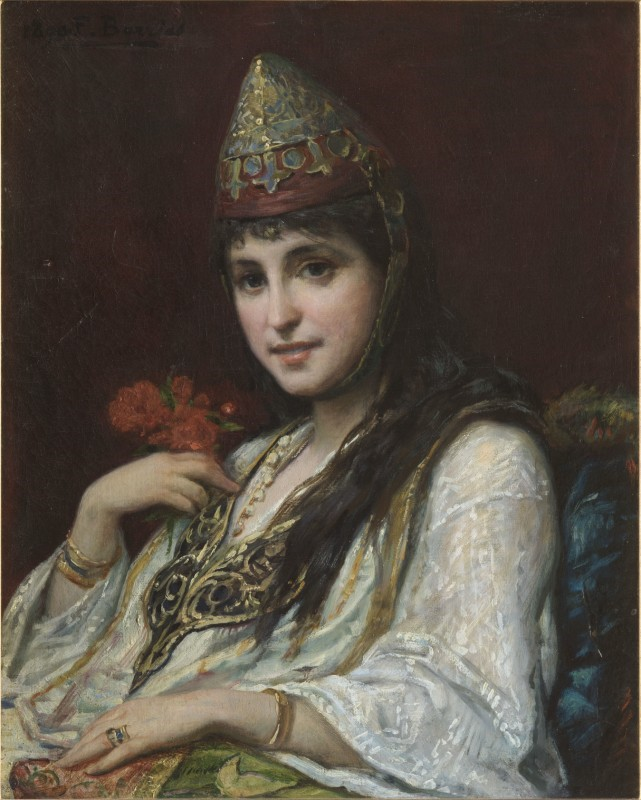
Jewish Woman, Félix-Joseph Barrias, 1890

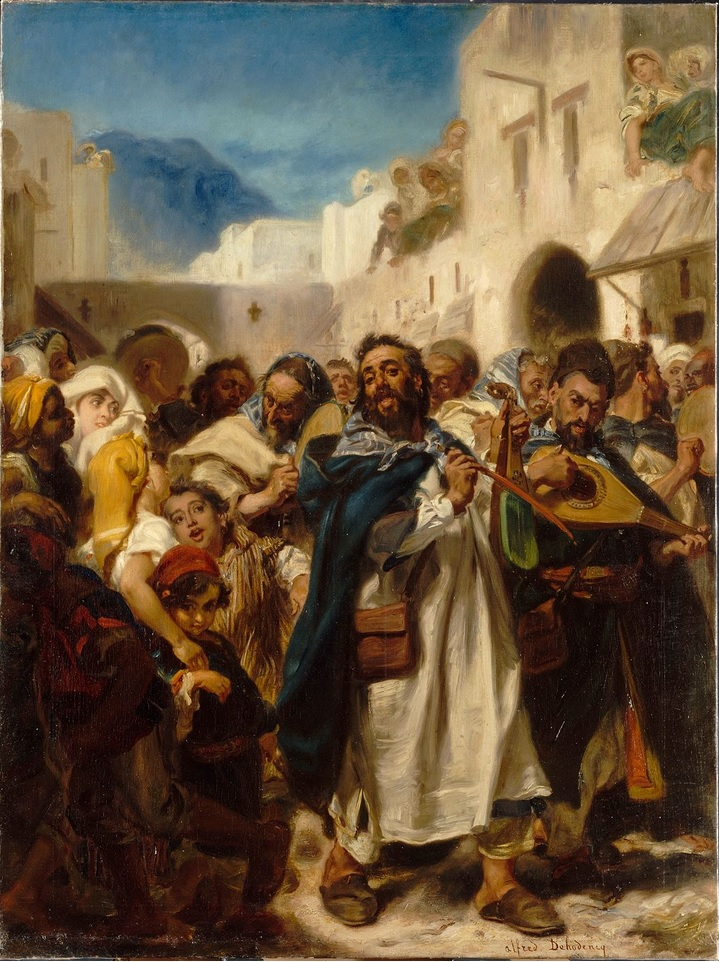
Jewish Festival in Tetuan, Alfred Dehodencq, 1865

=== Jewish emancipation: the French model ===
The era of the emancipation of the Jews in France began with the French Revolution at the end of the 18th century: they became citizens in 1790–1791. This section offers a panorama of French Judaism in the 19th century. It focuses on important moments of the Jews’ integration into modern society, including the creation of the consistories (1808) under the auspices of Napoleon Bonaparte which organized French Judaism, as well as the establishment of state secularism in 1905. These moments are illustrated by works depicting Jewish themes by French and European artists including Alphonse Levy, Edouard Brandon, Edouard Moyse, Samuel Hirszenberg, Maurycy Gottlieb, and Maurycy Minkovski. These works of art show that Jewish art is not simply liturgical or traditional. Jews were finally permitted to study at L’Ecole des Beaux-Arts and many Jewish artists from the time were interested in staying faithful to the traditions of the Beaux Arts. The social ascent of many Jews in France is illustrated by a number of portraits of prominent political, economic, and cultural figures, such as Rachel, Adolphe Crémieux, and the Pereire brothers.

This section also includes items from the Fonds Dreyfus, an exceptional archive donated by the grandchildren of Captain Alfred Dreyfus. The Dreyfus affair was a major event of the end of the 19th century in France: a Jewish Captain of the French Army was accused of high treason and was only cleared years later. The museum's archive consists of more than three thousand manuscripts, letters, photographs, family heirlooms, and official documents.

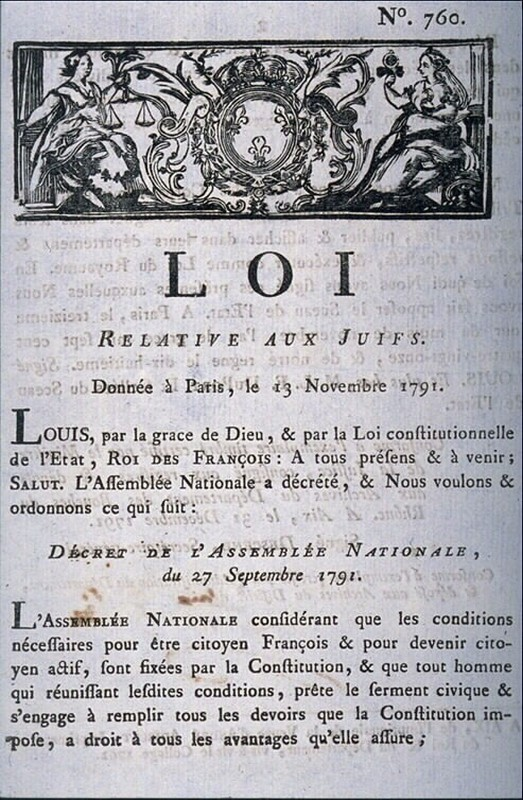
Law proclaiming the Emancipation of the Jews (1791)

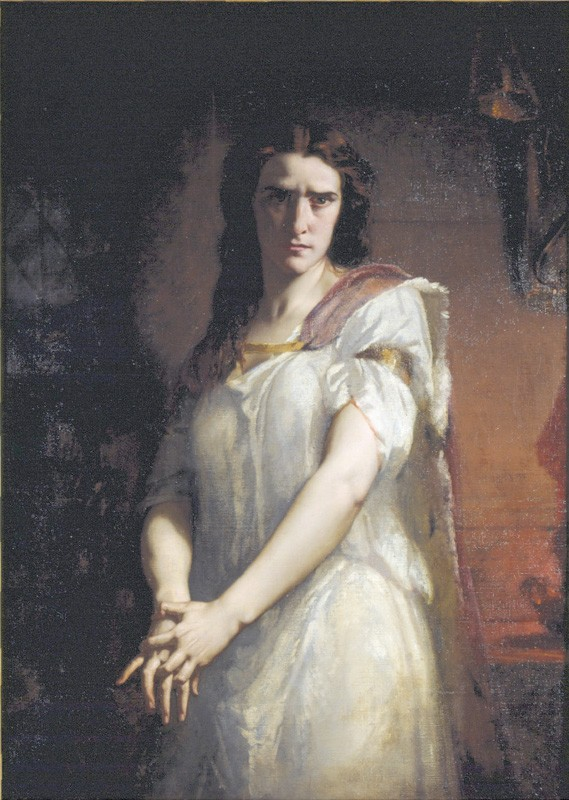
Rachel dans Lady Macbeth, Charles-Louis Müller (1849)

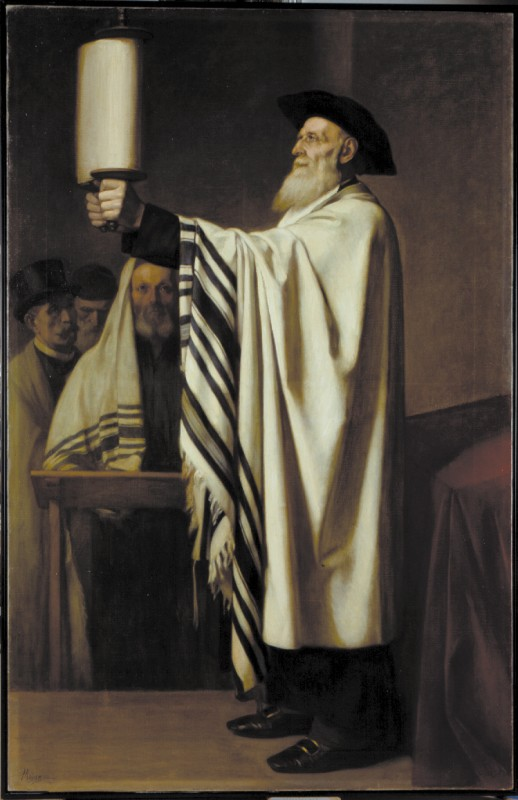
Presenting the Torah, Edouard Moyse (1860)

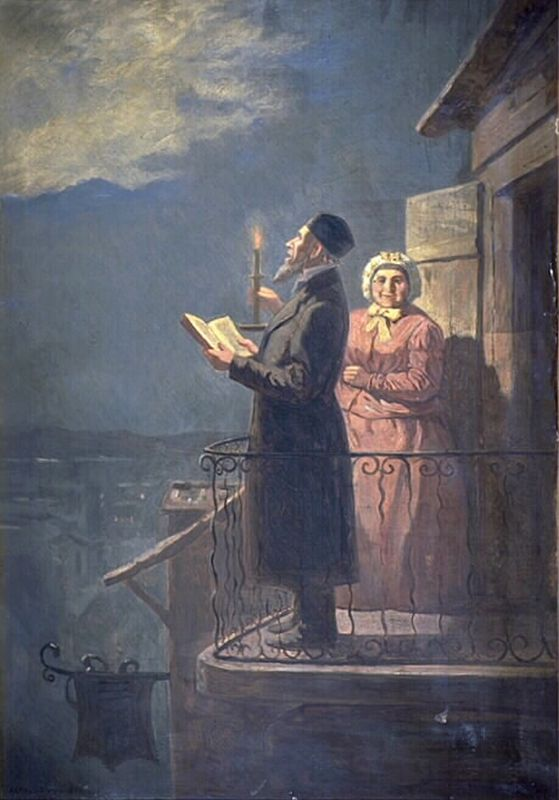
Evening prayer, Alphonse Levy (1883)

=== Intellectual and political movements in Europe ===
This section shows the flourishing intellectual life of European Jews at the turn of the century, including the emergence of Zionism, the rebirth of the Hebrew language, the blooming of Yiddish culture, and the creation of political movements in Russia and Poland such as the Bund. A small section is dedicated to the creation of the state of Israel.

=== Jewish presence in 20th-century art ===
This area contains works on paper and books from the beginning of the 20th century that highlight the Jewish cultural renaissance in Germany and Russia at the time. One of the missions of the museum is to deepen the public's knowledge of the major formal and stylistic directions of important and sometimes forgotten artists. These works focus on folklore, ornamental motifs, Biblical subjects, and calligraphy with Jewish theme.

This section shows the contribution of Jewish artists to world art of the early 20th century. It features artists of the School of Paris, such as Amedeo Modigliani, Pascin, Chaïm Soutine, Michel Kikoine, Jacques Lipchitz, and Chana Orloff. The diversity of their individual artistic developments and their confrontation with modernity show the transition of Jewish art into art that is no longer exclusively religious.

The museum acquired an archive collection of over a thousand documents related to the artist Jacques Lipchitz, including many photographs and manuscripts.

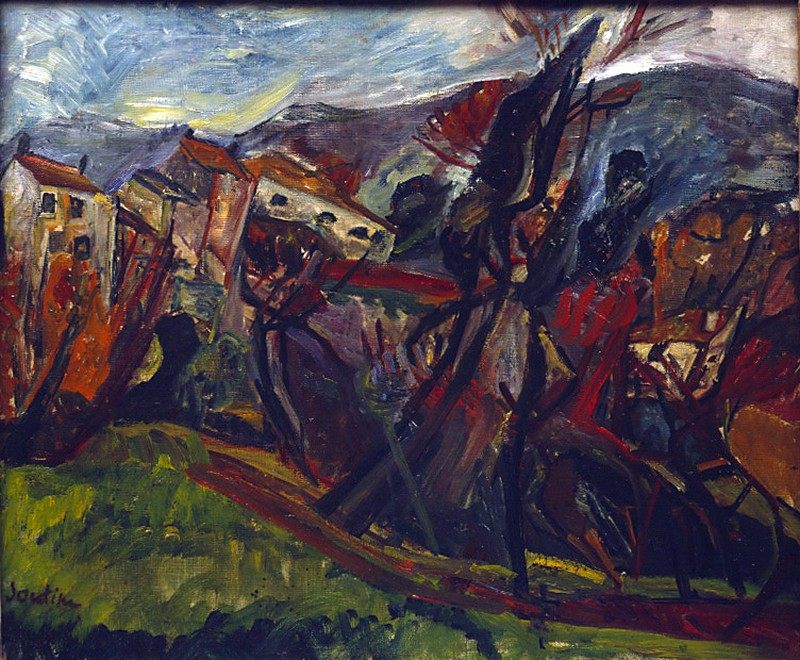
Paysage de Céret, Chaïm Soutine (1919)

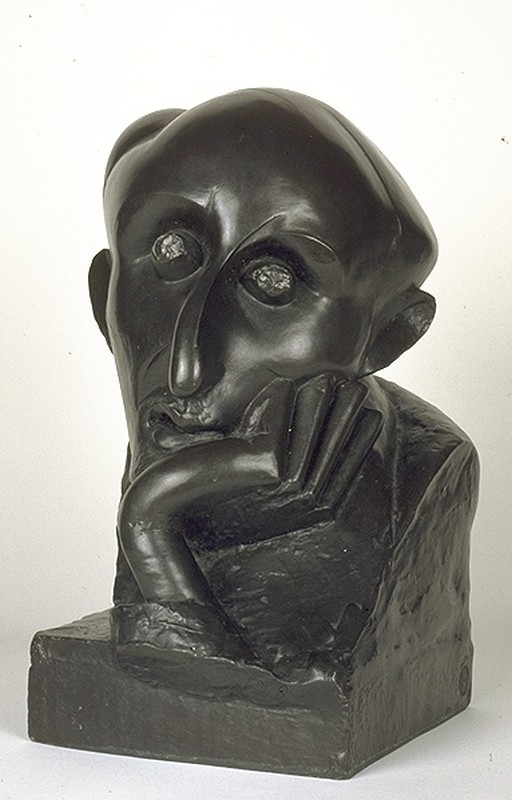
The Jewish Painter, Chana Orloff (1920)

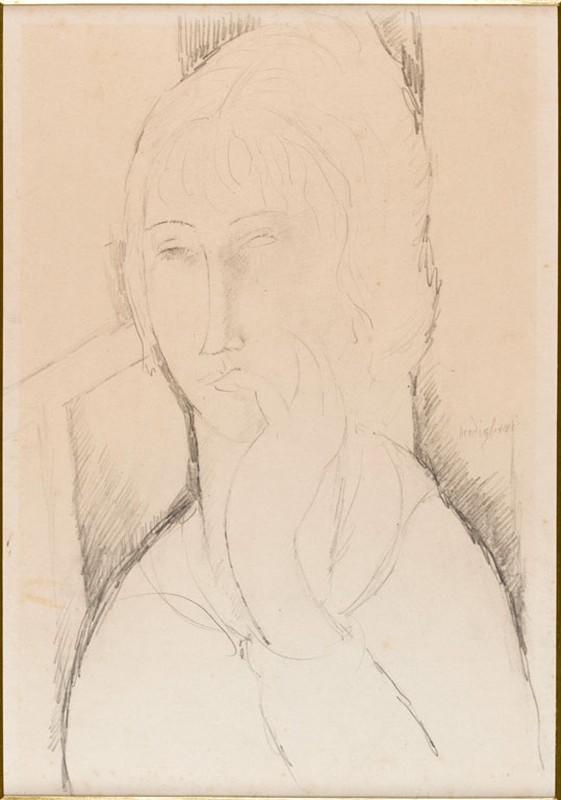
Jeune femme en buste, Amedeo Modigliani

=== To be a Jew in Paris in 1939 ===
The museum did not wish to have a collection devoted to the Holocaust because at the time of its creation, the project for a Memorial for the Holocaust had already been launched: "a Holocaust museum will be opening in Paris after the planned extension of the Mémorial juif". However, it does trace the lives of some Eastern European, Russian, Polish, and Romanian Jews who came to live in Paris at the beginning of the 20th century and whose paths all led to the Hotel de Saint-Aignan. The museum offers a documented itinerary of the lives of twelve Jewish immigrants to Paris, illustrating Jewish life in the Marais, community organizations, and the last part of the life of these exterminated communities before deportation.

To complete this presentation, the contemporary artist Christian Boltanski created a poignant installation placed in a small courtyard inside the museum made up of the names of the inhabitants, both Jews and non-Jews, of the Hotel Saint-Aignan on the eve of WWII. The installation reveals the history of the humble people who lived in the building before the war.

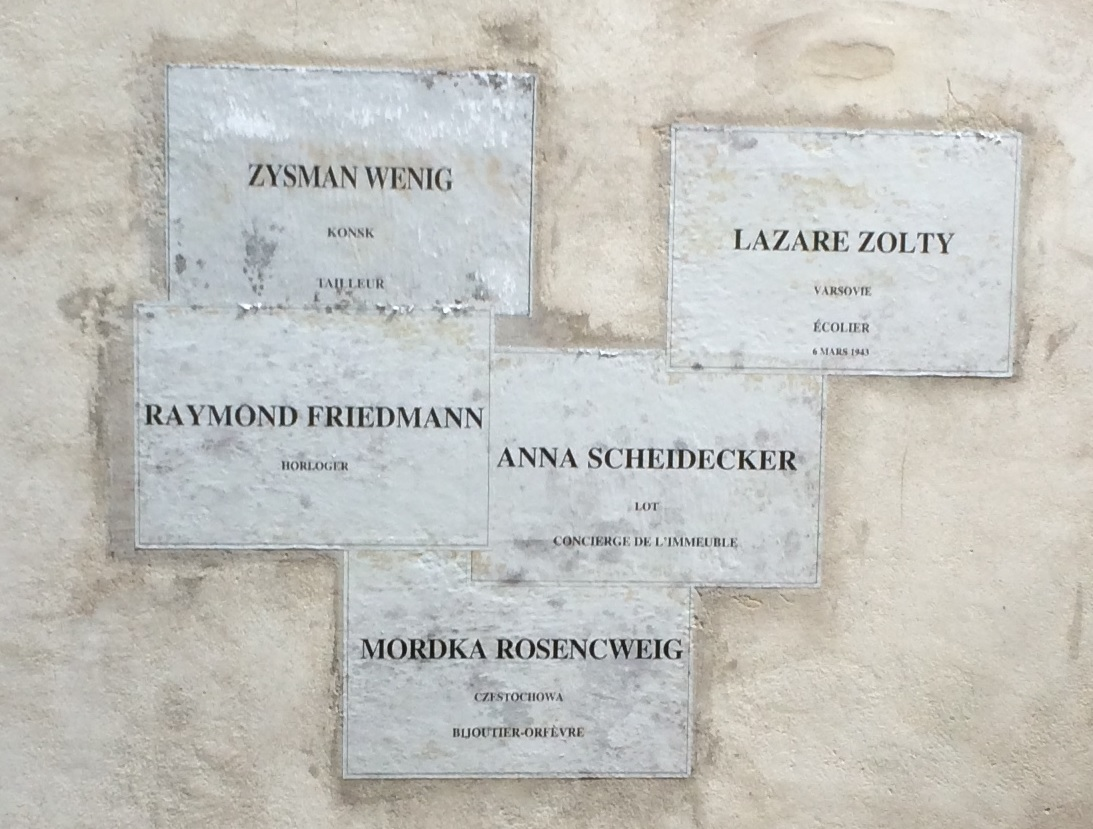
The people of the Hôtel de Saint-Aignan in 1939, Christian Boltanski (1998)

== The Dreyfus affair ==
The museum created an online platform in 2006 dedicated to the Dreyfus affair, giving the public access to more than three thousand documents, letters, photographs, and historical archives, donated by Captain Dreyfus’ grandchildren. These documents are all accessible on the webpage Fonds Dreyfus. The donations made by his grandchildren are the most important contributions to the historical collection of the museum since its creation. The museum has one of the largest collections of documents concerning the Dreyfus affair in France, including letters written by Alfred Dreyfus and his wife to each other, legal documents and photographs of his trial, writings by Dreyfus during his time in prison, and personal family photographs.

The finest pieces of this exceptional archive are displayed in a dedicated area in the museum as part of the permanent collection. The museum's library has over three hundred publications related to the Dreyfus affair.

An 8-foot tall reproduction of a statue of Alfred Dreyfus holding his broken sword, made by the French artist Louis ‘TIM’ Mitelberg in 1986, stands in the center of the museum courtyard.

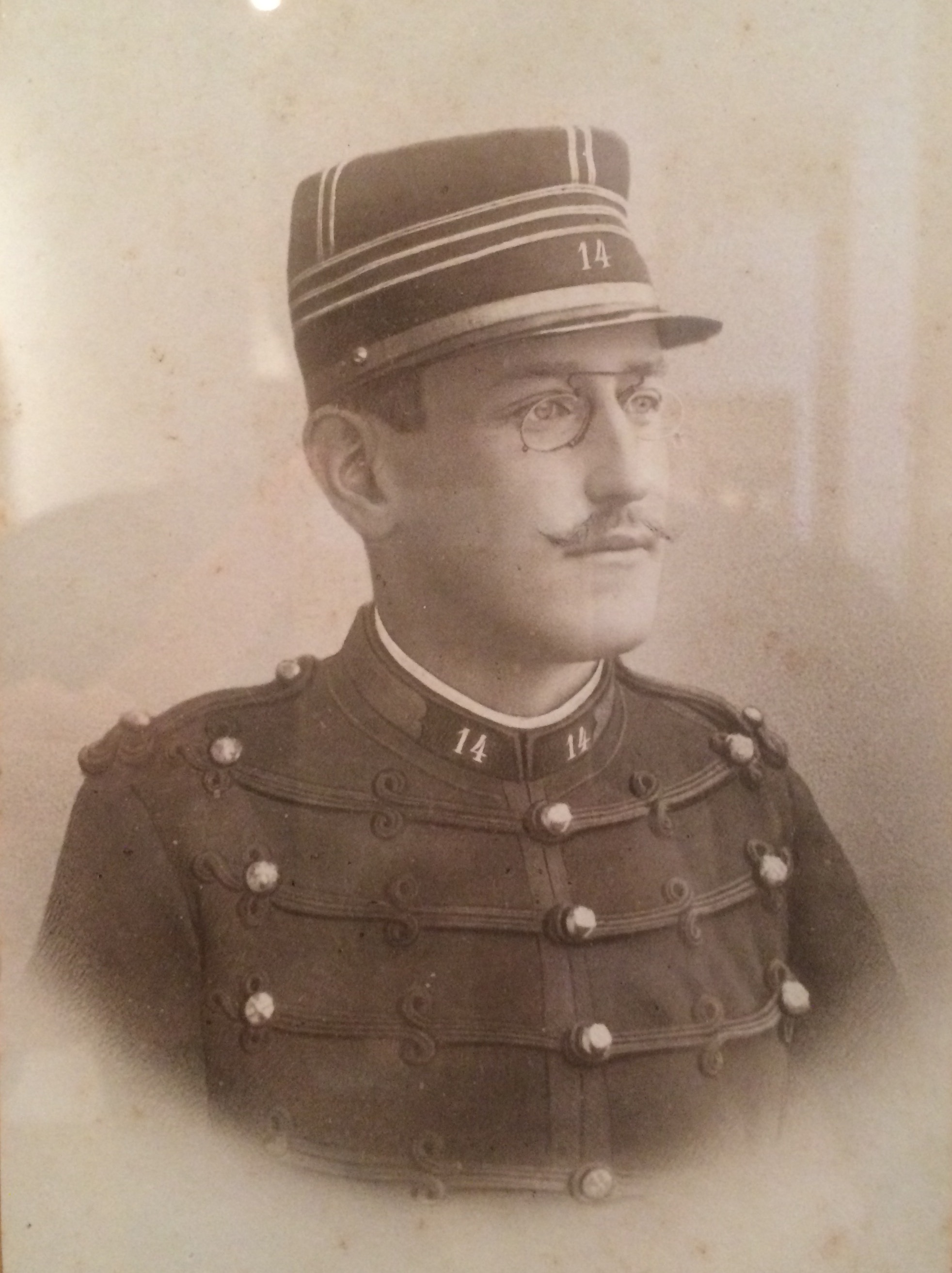
Alfred Dreyfus in 1890

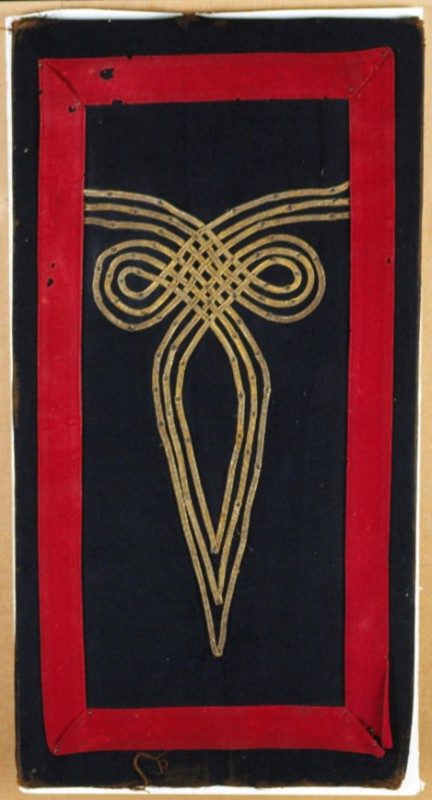
Captain Dreyfus's officer stripes that were ripped out as a symbol of treason

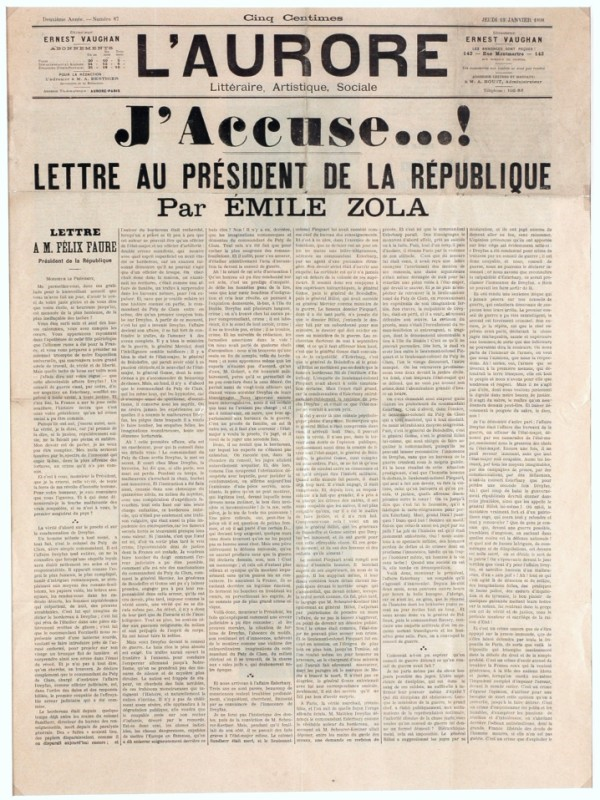
J'accuse...!, 1898 letter by writer Emile Zola published in the newspaper L'Aurore accusing the government for his treatment of the Dreyfus affair

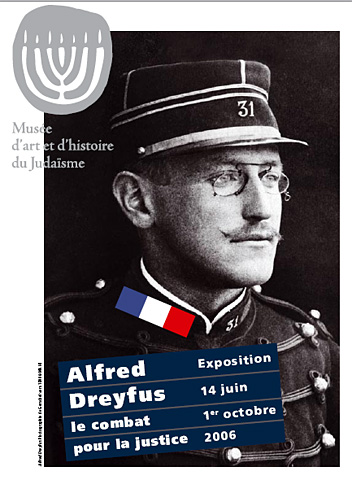
Poster of the 2006 exhibit Alfred Dreyfus, the Fight for Justice

== Status ==
The Musée d'Art et d'Histoire du Judaïsme is as a non-profit organization. It is a public museum subsidized by the City of Paris and the ministry of Culture. Its board of directors is made up of five representatives from the ministry of Culture, five from the City of Paris, six from Jewish institutions; and four people chosen by the Fondation Pro mahJ.

== The Foundation Pro mahJ ==
The Foundation Pro mahJ is a foundation created in 2003 whose purpose is to support the activities of the museum, especially to finance exhibitions and publications, as well as to enrich the collection. It was created at the initiative of Claire Maratier (1915–2013), the painter Michel Kikoïne's daughter. The foundation receives donations and legacies to financially support the museum. It regularly organizes special events for its donors. Every two years a prize Maratier is awarded to a contemporary artist.

== Exhibitions and installations ==
The museum promotes contemporary Jewish art by organizing temporary exhibitions. For example, in November 2016, a temporary installation by contemporary Israeli artist Sigalit Landau called Miqlat (Shelter) was displayed in the museum's courtyard. The museum also presented two works by the Israeli artist Moshe Ninio: Glass(es) and Morgen. In the past, the museum has exhibited modern and contemporary artists such as Sophie Calle, Gotlib, Christan Boltanski, Michel Nedjar, and Micha Ullman.

== See also ==
- History of the Jews in France
- History of the Jews in Italy
- Jewish Emancipation
- Mémorial de la Shoah
- List of museums in Paris
