= Ezra Yachin =

Israeli soldier

- יכין עזרא
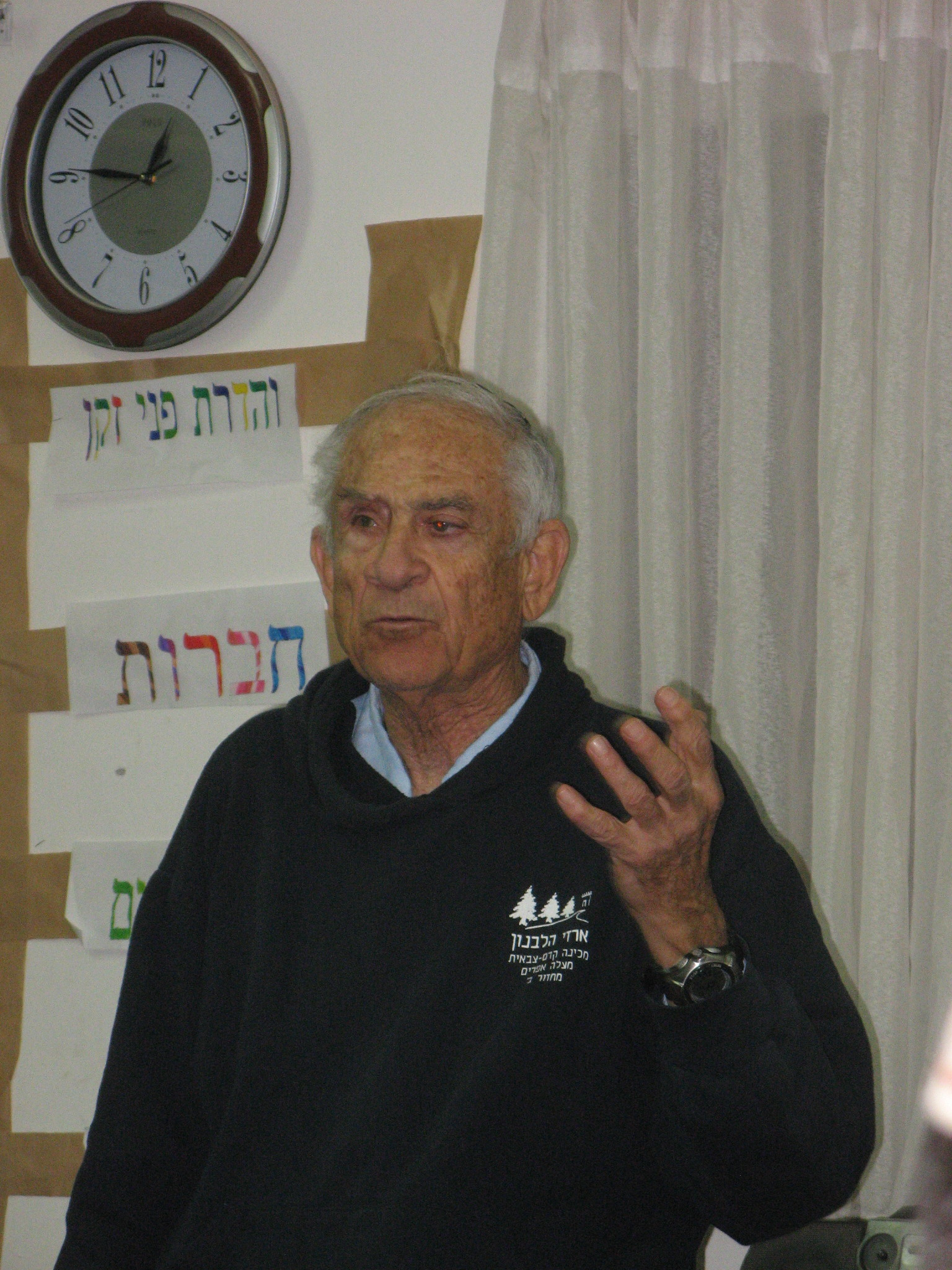
- Ezra Yachin giving a lecture to students in 2009
- Born: June 11, 1928 (age 98); Jerusalem, Mandatory Palestine
- Military career
- Allegiance: Lehi; Israel
- Branch: Israel Defense Forces
- Rank: Command Sergeant Major
- Conflicts: Deir Yassin massacre 1948 Palestine war
- Awards: Worthy Citizen of Jerusalem (2021); Roaring Lion for Bravery and Zionism (2026)

Ezra Yachin (Hebrew: יכין עזרא: born June 11, 1928) is an Israeli soldier and former member of Zionist paramilitary group Lehi. Yachin participated in the Deir Yassin massacre during the 1948 Palestine war.

Statements made by Yachin during the Gaza war in 2023 have been cited as evidence of intent and incitement in the Gaza genocide.

== Early life ==
Ezra Yachin was born on June 11, 1928 in Mandatory Palestine, to a family of six children. The family lived in the Old City of Jerusalem. Yachin's father was born in Jerusalem to a family of Syrian-Jewish background and his mother was an Egyptian-Jewish immigrant from Alexandria. One of his brothers was artist Abraham Yakin and he is an uncle of filmmaker Boaz Yakin. The family later moved to Yemin Moshe neighborhood. In 1929, the family became victims of a pogrom during which a mob of Arabs attempted to break into their home by kicking down the door. Afterwards, the family moved to Mahane Yehuda neighborhood.

Yachin's fluency in Arabic helped him join Zionist paramilitary group Lehi, which he joined at the age of 15. Prior to joining the group, Yachin worked as a mail carrier. He wished to join groups such as the Irgun or Lehi and tried to enter them for eight months. While working for Lehi, Yachin was tasked with copying letters meant for British authorities. Yachin did not tell his mother that he was a member of the group, but she knew about it. During one of his missions, Yachin and his friends were ambushed by British police and shot at, but they managed to escape. Yachin's best friend, Alexander Rubowitz, was kidnapped and tortured to death by British officer Roy Farran and a group of Special Air Service soldiers.

== Military career ==
=== Lehi ===
Throughout his service for Lehi, Yachin became a fighter and participated in multiple armed attacks against British authorities. He took part in a failed mission to assassinate British general Gordon MacMillan using explosives, during which Yachin and other fighters were almost surrounded.

Yachin participated in the 1948 Deir Yassin massacre, during which more than 100 Palestinian civilians were killed. In a 2020 interview with The Jewish Press, Yachin said his group of 100 Lehi fighters was ordered to announce their approach and call on village to surrender. Yachin said that as he and his fellow soldiers entered the village, they were met with heavy fire, resulting in several soldiers dying. Yachin said that "Arab women and children of Deir Yassin" were armed "like the men" and took part in the fighting. Yachin said that he and his group engaged in house to house combat, during which they were ambushed by "Arab men dressed as women".

Yachin defended Jerusalem against the Arab forces in the 1948 Palestine war. During the battle of the Old City of Jerusalem, Yachin was wounded by a bomb shrapnel. As he was being rescued on a stretcher, a second shell exploded near him, striking him in the skull. As a result, Yakhin lost the sight of his right eye and suffered permanent scars on his thigh.

=== Israel Defense Forces ===
According to the Israel Defense Forces, Yachin gave more than 9,000 lectures to IDF personnel since 1973. He works as an educator for the IDF. In 1979, Yachin published several memoirs. In 1992, Yachin published a book titiled ELNAKAM: Story of a Fighter for the Freedom of Israel, which talked about his life. The Hebrew version of the book was popular and was reprinted eight times. In 2011, American TV series Against All Odds featured Yachin in an episode titled A Boy Named Ezra. In 2018, IDF Rabbinate Chief Rabbi Hagai Wlosky awarded Yachin the rank of First Sergeant for his lectures. In 2021, he was awarded a Worthy Citizen of Jerusalem award for his service in Lehi and his books.

==== Gaza war and genocide ====
With the outbreak of the Gaza war in October 2023 Yachin was called up for military service at the age of 95. He is considered to be the oldest reservist in Israel. Yachin did not participate in combat and instead boosted morale of IDF soldiers fighting in the Gaza Strip by giving motivational speeches.

Yachin addressed IDF soldiers in October 2023, stating:

Be triumphant and finish them oﬀ and don’t leave anyone behind. Erase the memory of them. Erase them, their families, mothers and children. These animals can no longer live ... Every Jew with a weapon should go out and kill them. If you have an Arab neighbour, don’t wait, go to his home and shoot him ... We want to invade, not like before, we want to enter and destroy what's in front of us, and destroy houses, then destroy the one after it. With all of our forces, complete destruction, enter and destroy. As you can see, we will witness things we’ve never dreamed of. Let them drop bombs on them and erase them.

This speech was used in South Africa's genocide case against Israel as evidence of intent and incitement in the Gaza genocide.

In May 2024, Yachin lighted a torch at Torch-lighting Ceremony celebrating 76th year of Israel's indepencence. In June 2024, Yachin was promoted to Command Sergeant Major. In February 2026, Yachin was awarded the "Roaring Lion for Bravery and Zionism" at a conference in Knesset commemorating the 106th anniversary of the Battle of Tel Hai.

== Personal life ==
Following the 1948 Palestine war, Yachin began working as a clerk and later founded an art gallery in Jerusalem which he closed in the 1990s. In 1968, Yachin founded Beit Hashiva, a building in Beit Hanina neighborhood where he lives. Yachin has a son, Ariel Yachin.
