= Yakeen =

Yakeen may refer to:

- Yakeen, a 1969 Indian film directed by Brij
- Yakeen, a 2005 Indian thriller film directed by Girish Dhamija

== See also ==
- Yakin (disambiguation)
