= Abraham Yakin =

Israeli painter (1924–2020)

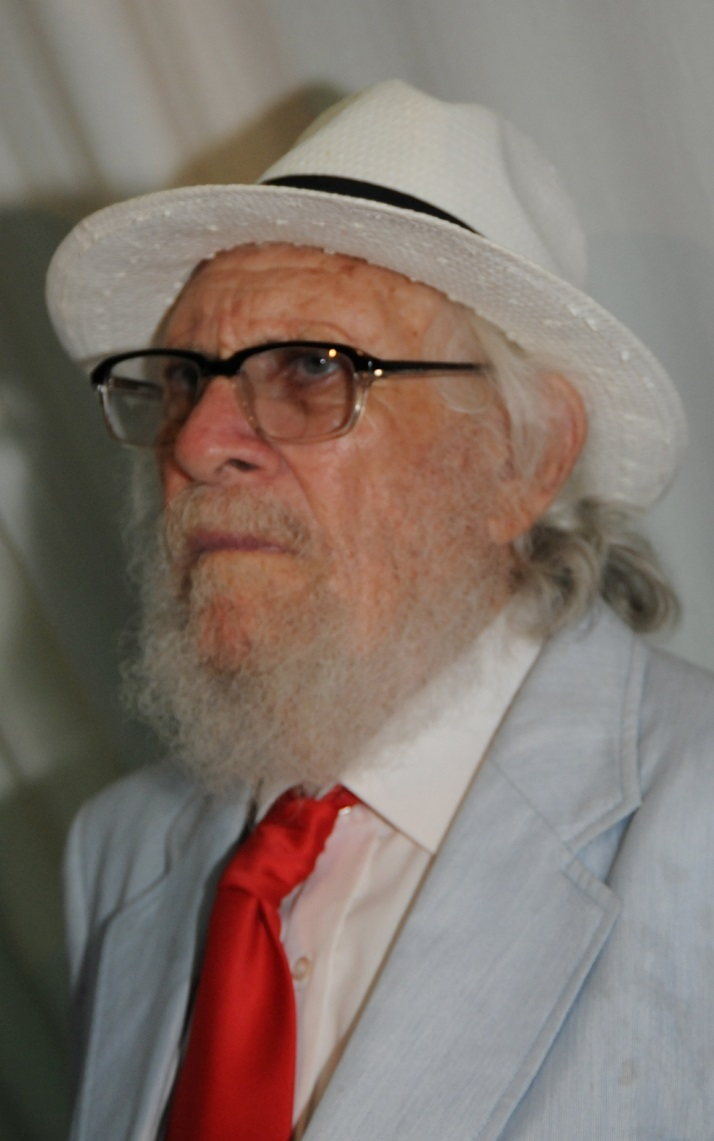

Abraham Yakin (Hebrew: אברהם יכין; 31 July 1924 – 10 May 2020) was an Israeli artist.

== Background ==
Abraham Yakin was born in Jerusalem. One of his siblings was Lehi fighter Ezra Yachin. During World War II he joined the Royal Navy and served three years in the Mediterranean Fleet. He sailed around the Mediterranean and visited art centers in Egypt, Greece, France, and Italy during his service. After the war, he returned to Jerusalem and joined the Haganah. At the same time, he started his artistic training at Bezalel Academy, where he studied with Jacob Steinhardt and Mordecai Ardon. He became involved in Communist activities during his youth and in 1946 was fined 15 Palestine pounds after he was caught putting up Communist posters.

With Israel's declaration of independence, Yakin joined the Israel Defense Forces and served in the 1948 Arab-Israeli War. He resumed his studies in 1950, and he had his first exhibition in 1953. In 1957 he married Hannah, an artist who had recently immigrated from the Netherlands. The couple divided their time between raising eight children, teaching art in Jerusalem, and exhibiting extensively in Israel, Europe and the United States.

In 1961 Abraham Yakin won the international Adolphe Neumann Prize in Paris. Works of Yakin are in the Israel Museum, Jerusalem, the Musee d'Art Juif, Paris, and several museums in the Netherlands.

== See also ==
- Visual arts in Israel
