= Hannah Yakin =

Israeli artist

Hannah Yakin (Hebrew: חנה יקין; born Hannah van Hulst; 3 March 1933, in Amsterdam) is an Israeli artist.

During World War II, Yakin developed her artistic talents, experiencing "happy times in which necessity bore creativity".

After the war Yakin went to high school and studied art in Utrecht and in Paris with Paul Colin. In 1956 she emigrated to Israel where she met and married the artist Abraham Yakin. During the first years of her marriage she concentrated chiefly on the themes of pregnancy, birth-giving and motherhood. After 1965 she created two large series of etchings, one about evolution, the other about music and musicians. In 1978 she took up writing, this time in English. Some of her short stories were published in American and Canadian literary magazines. A number of her stories were recently broadcast by the BBC World Service. She has published three illustrated books in small editions, as collector's items.

== Publications ==
- Hannah & Abraham Yakin : Jerusalem, 1963
- A. Yakin, Hannah Yakin, 1969
- Hier is je bruidegom, 2004
- Jardena : dagboek uit Jeruzalem, 2008
- Hagadah le-Ṭu bi-Shevaṭ, 2017
- Mi-tokh ḳonkiyah = What's in a shell
