= Musée d'Art Juif =

Defunct museum in Paris, France

Coordinates: 48°53′25″N 2°20′26″E

The Musée d'Art Juif was a private museum of Jewish art located at 42, rue des Saules, in the 18th arrondissement of Paris, France. The nearest Paris Métro station is Lamarck – Caulaincourt on Line 12.

The museum was established in 1948 in the Montmartre district of Paris as an homage to the Jewish culture destroyed by the Holocaust. Its first collections were religious objects donated in 1951 by the Jewish Restitution Successor Organization, and subsequently a document collection focusing on European synagogue architecture. Marie Chabchay, the museum's first curator, embarked on building up a collection of graphic works by Russian, German, and Parisian artists. The museum contained twelve rooms with collections including a reconstructed synagogue and synagogue models, ethnological objects, paintings, sculptures, and tomb stones from Prague.

In 1998, major portions of its collection were moved to the new Musée d'Art et d'Histoire du Judaïsme in the 3rd arrondissement of Paris.

== See also ==
- List of museums in Paris
