= Berberisca dress =

Traditional wedding dress for Moroccan Jewish women

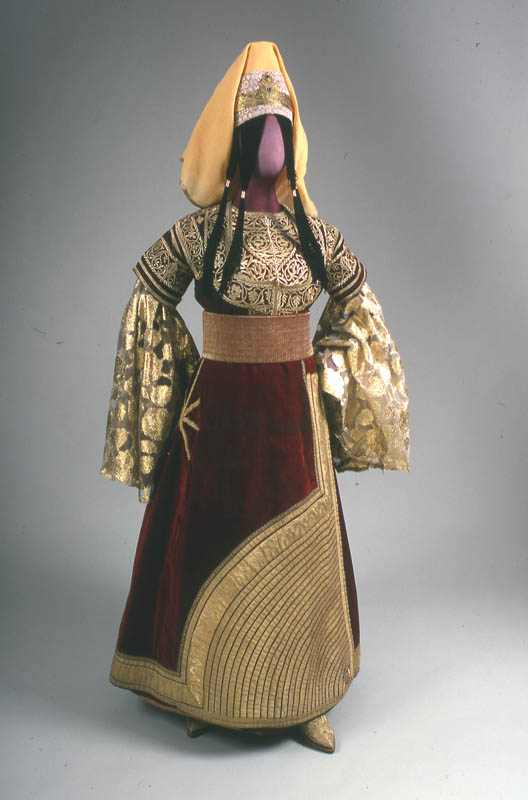
Berberisca dress from the 19th/20th century

The berberisca dress or keswa-el-kbira (Arabic: الكسوة الكبيرة, 'the grand gown') is a traditional wedding dress worn by Moroccan Jews.Traditionally, a father gifts his daughter a berberisca dress for her wedding and the first time she wears it is at the henna ceremony. The dress is made to represent Judaism as a religion, highlighting the bride as someone who will keep Jewish tradition. Gold detailing is used to accomplish this goal with the twenty-two braided gold galloons on the skirt meant to represent the twenty-two letters in the Hebrew alphabet. Other symbols like the tree of life and large swirls to represent the circle of life are also embroidered in gold. While the keswa-el-kbria has roots in fifteenth-century Spain with the style following the trends of Spanish royalty, the style of the dress has changed throughout history, incorporating new techniques of braiding gold thread. Many of the designs can be seen on algerian funeral dresses and Jewish tombs in northern Africa, showing the combination of culture throughout the Sephardic diaspora.

As fashions evolved throughout history, the production of the keswa-el-kbria became very expensive, causing many people to rent them out or borrow them, with the production of the dress stopping in the 1960s. While production stopped, many ceremonial garments used for events near Andalusia today share a striking resemblance to the keswa-el-kbria, being made of velvet with gold detailing.
