= Marek Yanai =

- מרק ינאי
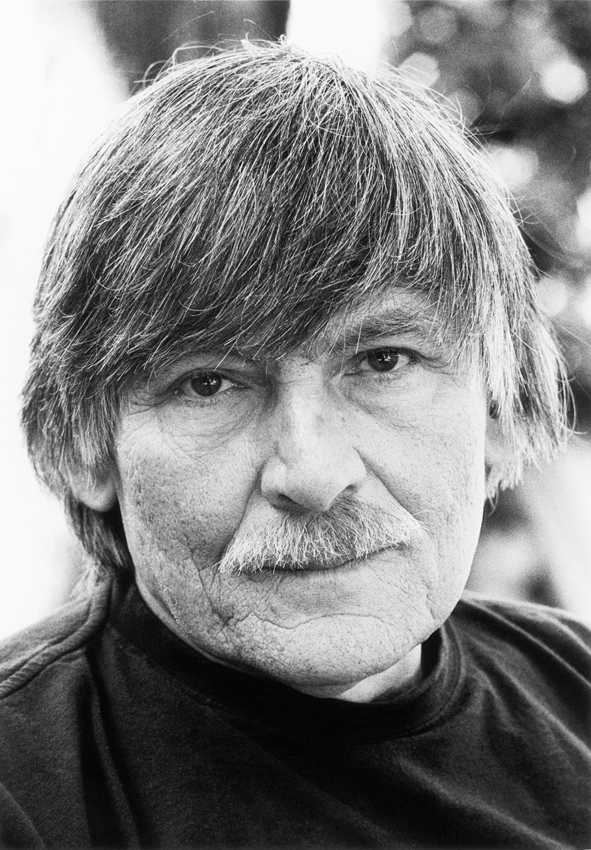
- Marek Yanai portrait
- Born: 1946 (age 79–80); Germany
- Education: Bezalel Academy of Arts and Design, Jerusalem
- Known for: Painting
- Style: Figurative
- Website: http://marekyanai.com

Marek Yanai (Hebrew: מרק ינאי; born 1946) is an Israeli figurative painter and senior lecturer at Bezalel Academy of Art and Design, Jerusalem. He paints in watercolor and oil. His work as a painter and a teacher has contributed greatly to the establishing and development of figurative expression in art, design and animation in Israel.

== Biography ==
Marek Yanai was born in Germany in 1946 and immigrated to Israel from Poland in 1957.

He graduated from the Bezalel Academy of Arts and Design, Jerusalem in 1970, student of Yosef Hirsch.

In 1969 he founded the “Teddy” Puppet Theater, and was its director until 1971.

In 1973 and 1974 he studied techniques of the Old Masters in the Kunsthistorisches Museum in Vienna and the San Fernando Royal Academy of Fine Art, Madrid.

From 1996 until today he is a senior lecturer at the Bezalel Academy of Art and Design, Jerusalem and also teaches in his own studio.

Yanai lives and works in Jerusalem.

== Body of work ==
Yanai's works are figurative and strive to interpret reality. His subjects are the Jerusalem landscape and people. His portraits in watercolor depict friends, students, lecturers and other people in his life. This series is renowned for his work with patches of color and his ability to reveal the character of the subjects with the use of these marks and strong tones. The series of landscapes deal with, on the face of it, rather banal and mundane subjects such as solar panels on roofs, gas tanks and washing hanging out to dry. Through their banality, these scenes reflect the complexity of the city's soul. Yanai's creativity offers a picture of the spirit of the times in his vicinity. He is known for his use of light to produce shape and life.

The art researcher Gideon Ophrat wrote of Yanai :"(His works contain) metaphorical lights. Pressing them into an interior and surrounding them with shadows to symbolize the inner soul; while the victory of the bright and color-bleaching white in the outdoor landscapes represents the "I-world" relationship. The essence of the soul is darkness. The all-consuming whiteness is the essence of emergence into the world. Loss lies in wait in both extremes: sinking in the darkness of the self, or annihilating the body in the searing light outside. Marek Yanai endures in his paintings. Again and again he sallies out in the world to create it anew out of light".

=== Watercolor ===
Yanai has created a virtuosic body of work in watercolor. It is characterized by instinctive production of wet marks that permit random in the dispersal of the water. The making of the marks create a figurative image. The artist Sasha Okun: "Painting with watercolors creates an infinite number of surprises and unexpected situations. Yanai is gifted with the exceptional ability to control the unexpected, which is considered the ultimate ability by the Japanese, the greatest of watercolor artists."

=== Oil painting ===
Yanai's oil painting differs greatly from his work in watercolor in technique, style and temperament. His oil painting is realistic and built up over time, layer upon layer, as was the technique of 17th and 18th century European painters. Predominant themes in his work are entrances to, and interiors of, Jerusalem houses, and Jerusalem figures and landscapes.

== Teaching ==
From 1996 until the present, he is a senior lecturer at the Bezalel Academy of Art and Design Jerusalem, and also teaches in his studio. He has had a great influence on generations of artists in the painting, design and animation fields.

The principle of the studio's activities is painting from observation. The studio is characterized by a great respect for the craftsmanship in painting: drawing as a basis for painting, line and mark, composition, color theory, and faithfulness to the unwritten laws passed down through the centuries that are the foundations of art. Craftsmanship is repeatedly exercised as a value leading to personal interpretation and creative self-expression in a variety of media: drawing, oil and watercolor. Work takes place both in the studio space and, ‘en plein air’ in the Jerusalem landscape. The studio promotes working as a group to induce mutual learning and fertile creativity, while encouraging personal choice in artistic expression.

== Gallery ==
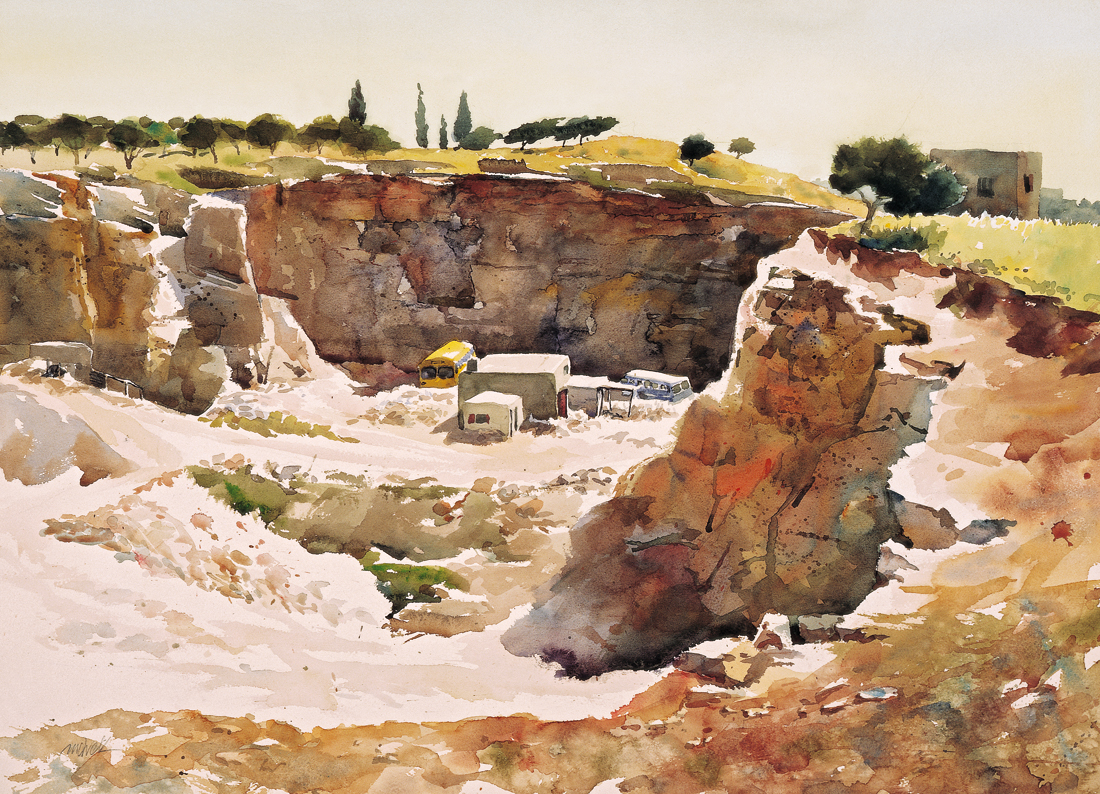
Marek Yanai, Quarry in Gilo, Watercolor on paper, 1992

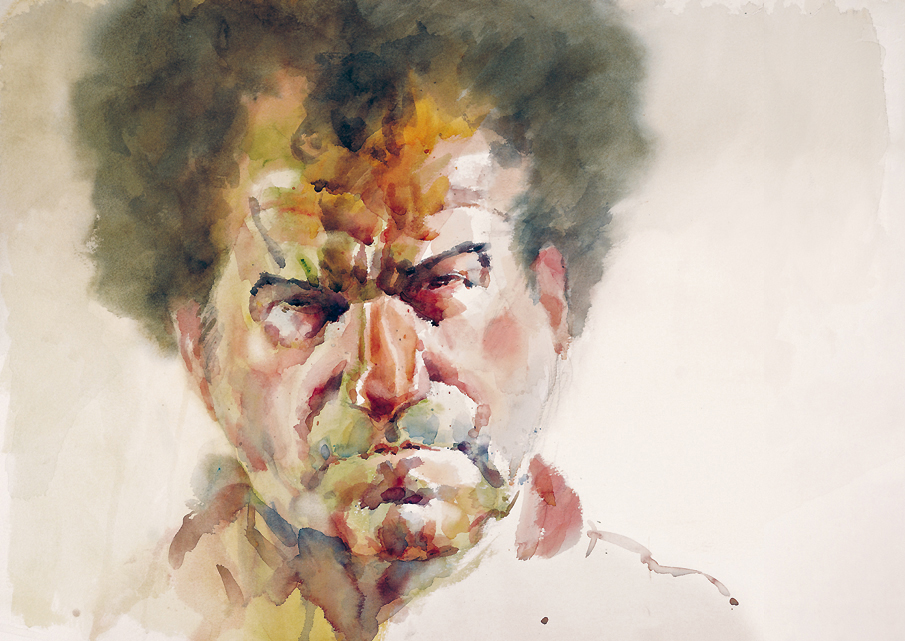
Marek Yanai, Dudu, Watercolor on paper, 1996

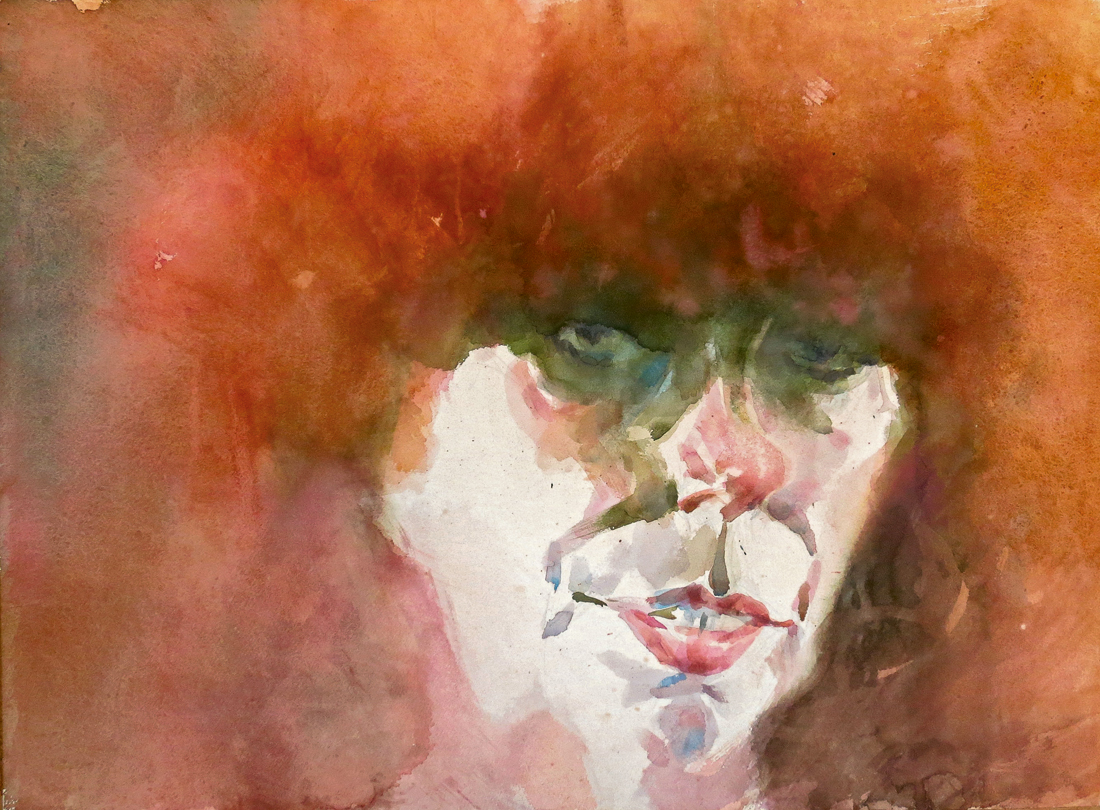
Marek Yanai, Hedva, Watercolor on paper, 2001

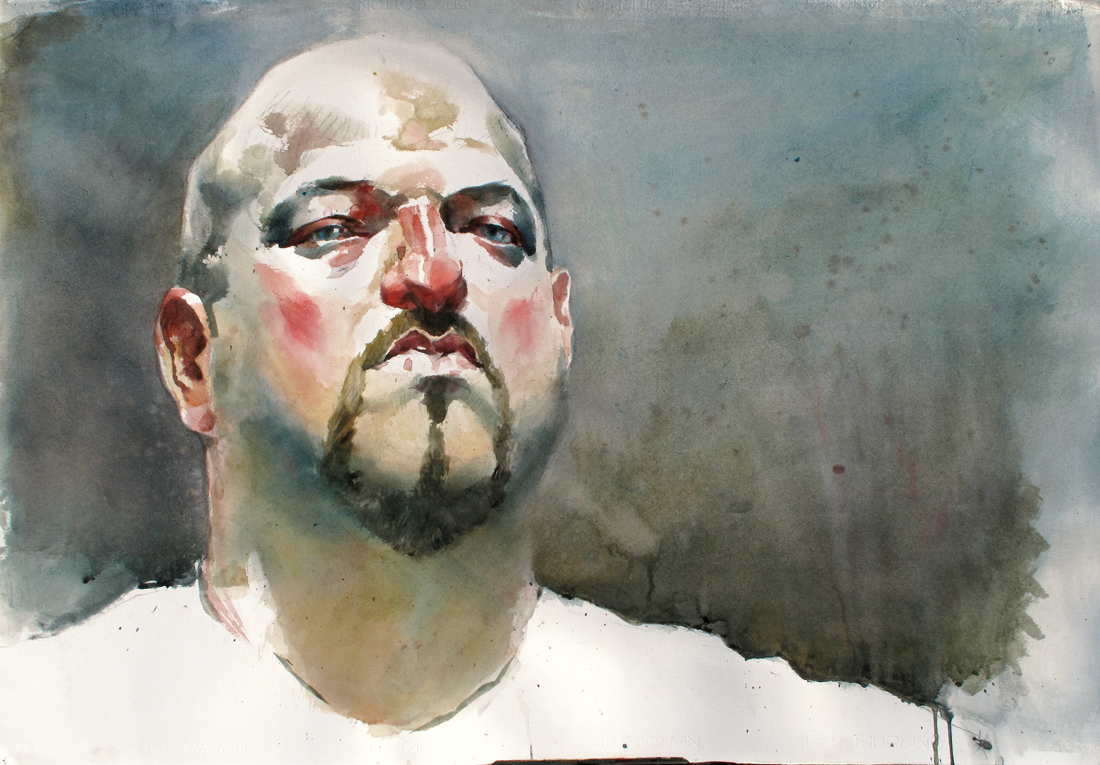
Marek Yanai, Yasha, Watercolor on paper, 2009

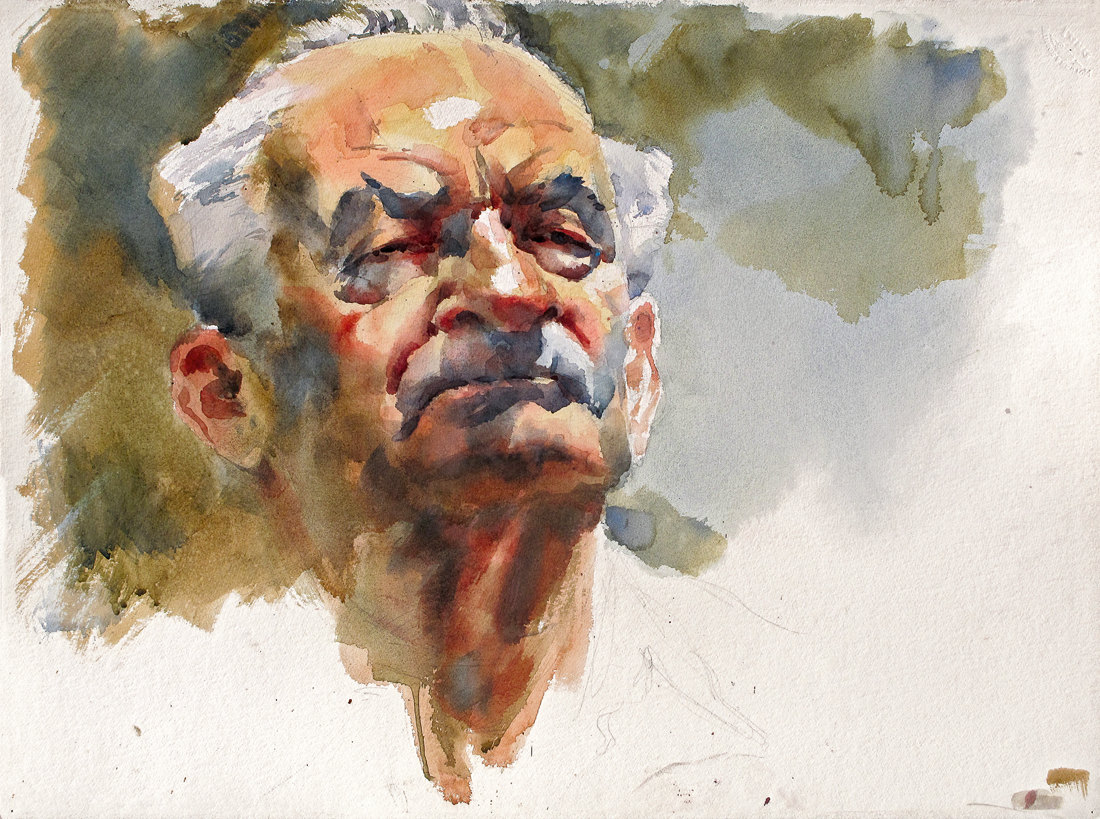
Marek Yanai, Diamar, Watercolor on paper, 2007

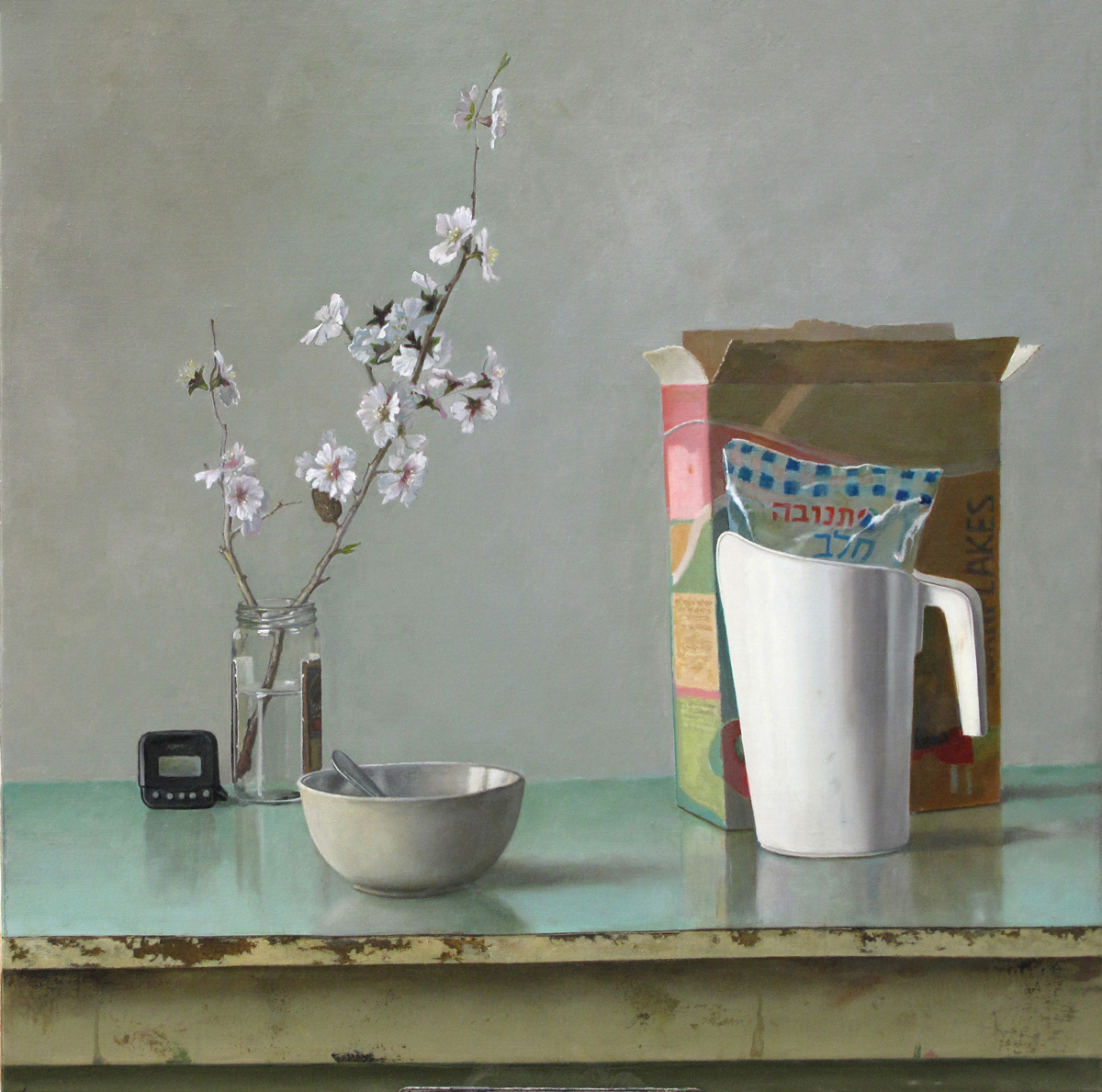
Marek Yanai, Breakfast with Almond blossom, Oil on canvas, 2016

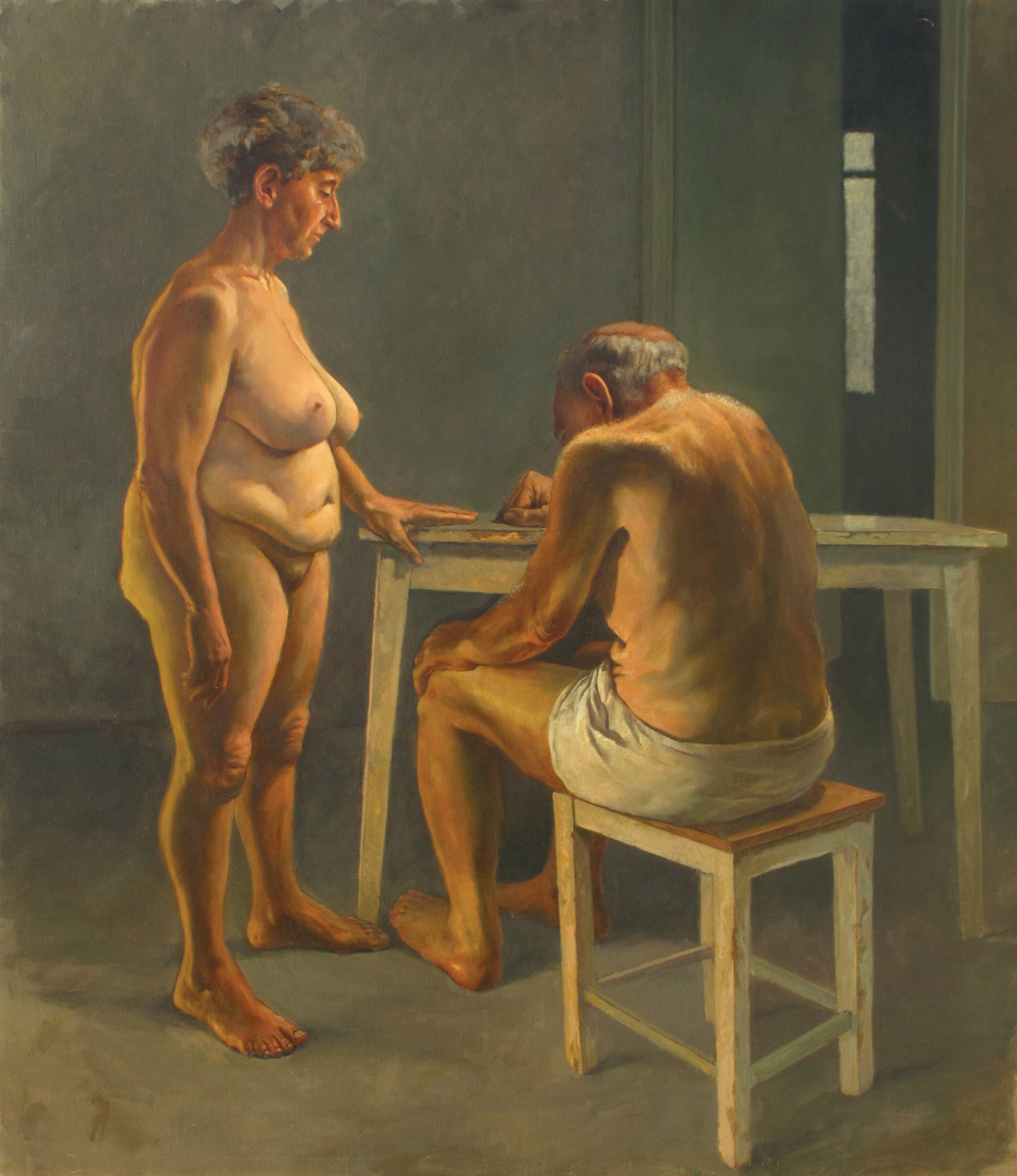
Marek Yanai, Untitled, Oil on canvas, 2004

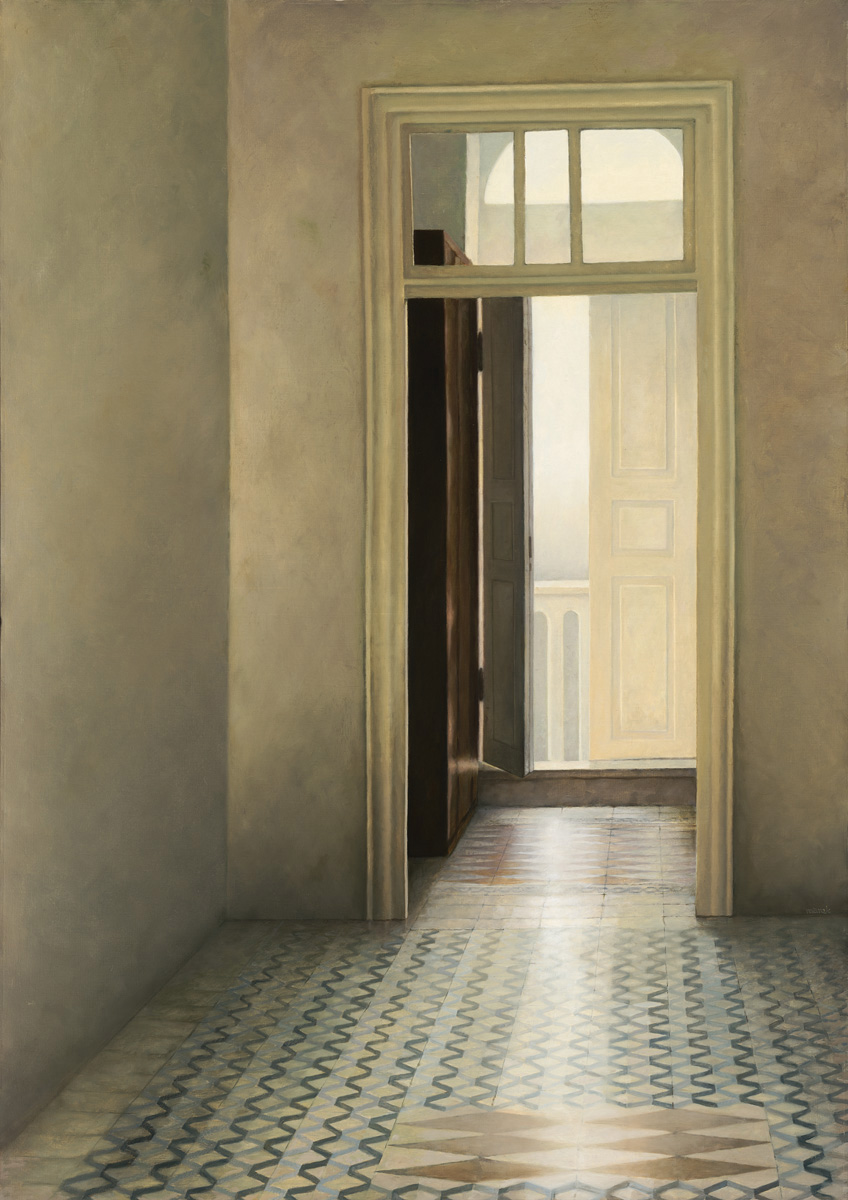
Marek Yanai, White Void, Oil on canvas, 2011

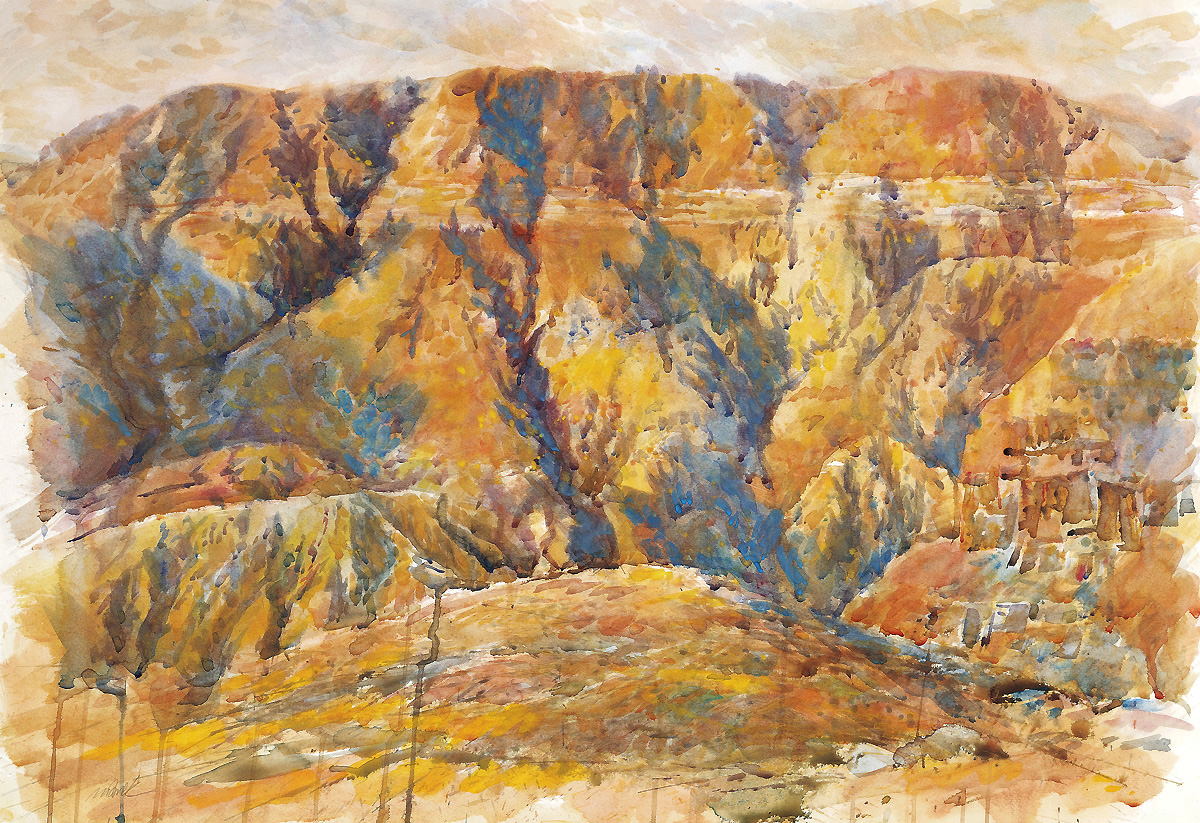
Marek Yanai, Qumran, Watercolor on paper, 1993

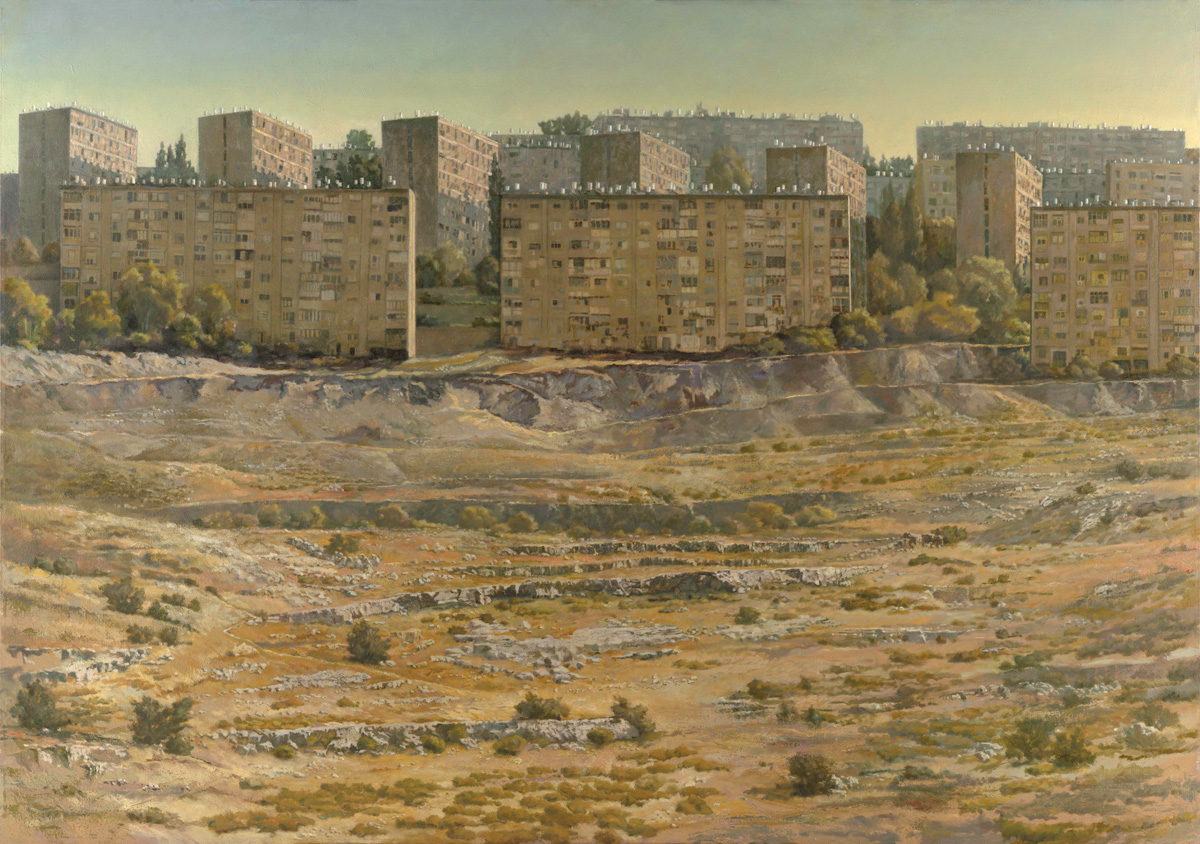
Marek Yanai, Jerusalem, Oil on canvas, 2007

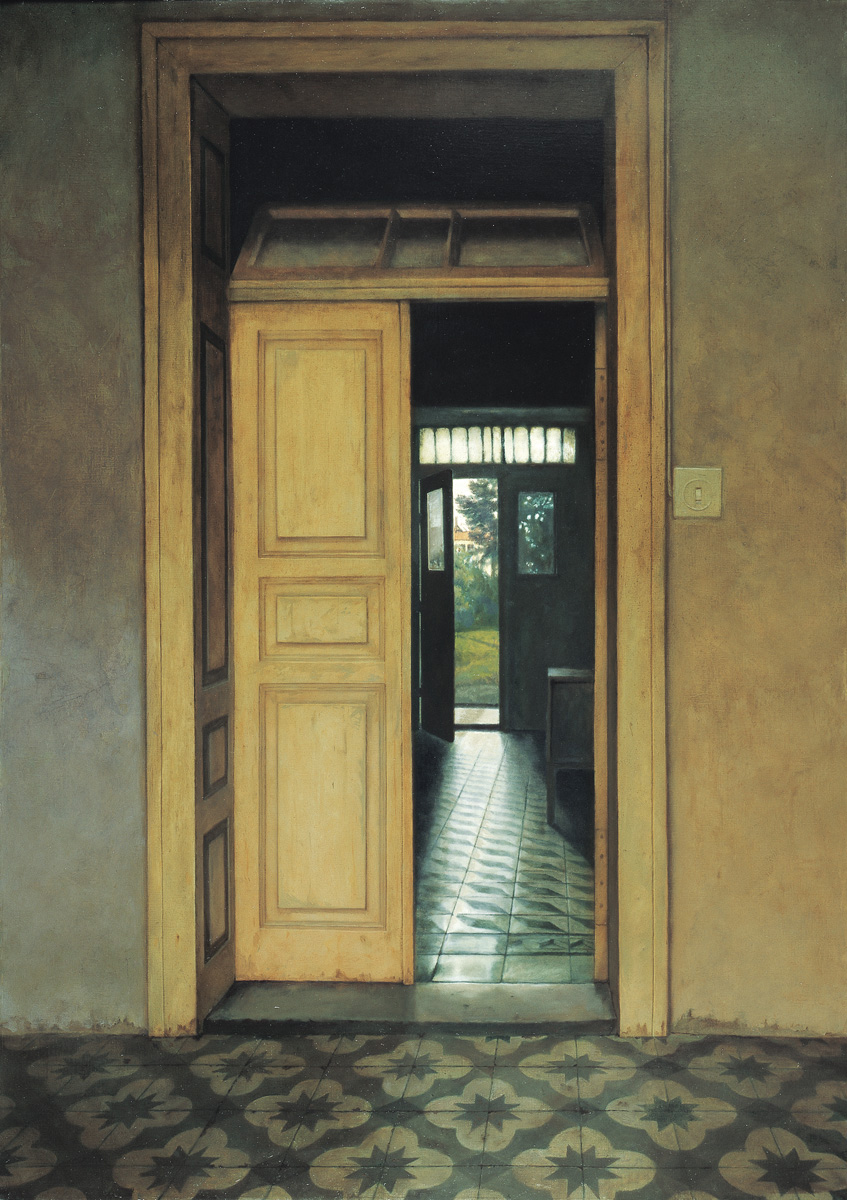
Marek Yanai, Entrance in Derech Beit Lechem, Oil on canvas, 2004

== Awards ==
- 2003 Mordechai Ish Shalom prize for a special contribution to art
- 1997 Shoshana Ish Shalom prize for artistic creation
- 1967 Fenniger prize for young artists

=== Artist's books ===
- 2016 Marek Yanai, watercolor
- 2004 Marek Yanai, Mayanot Gallery

=== Solo exhibitions ===
- 2022 Marek Yanai: On the Threshold (Curator: Amichai Chasson), Beit Avi Chai, Jerusalem
- 2016 Present: Portraits of People and Trees, Jerusalem Artists House
- 2015 Marek Yanai, Hacubia, Jerusalem
- 2014 Jerusalem double perspective, Matsart Gallery, Jerusalem
- 2014 Video screenings of watercolor portraits demos, Bezalel Academy of Art and Design Jerusalem
- 2004 Portraits, Jerusalem Artists House
- 2004 Recent works, Mayanot Gallery, Jerusalem
- 1997 Heads in watercolor, Jerusalem Artists House
- 1994 Carol Schwartz Gallery, Philadelphia
- 1993 Mayanot Gallery, Jerusalem
- 1991 Jerusalem Artists House
- 1990 S.D. Gallery, Lodz, Poland
- 1989 Carol Schwartz Gallery, Philadelphia
- 1988 Mayanot Gallery, Jerusalem
- 1987 Shdema Gallery, Tel Aviv
- 1984 Ella Gallery, Jerusalem
- 1983 Profile Gallery, New York
- 1982 VII Gallery, Boca Raton, Florida
- 1982 Engel Gallery, New York
- 1979 Jerusalem Artists House

== Illustration of books and magazines ==
Yanai has collaborated with artists in diverse fields and has contributed illustrations to important publications throughout the world.

- Book cover and illustrations: Another Journey with a Raven and Saint Claire by Hava Pinhas-Cohen
- Paintings for the feature film Nuzhat directed by Judd Ne'eman with the actor Mohammad Bakhri in the role of the artist
- Book cover: The Book in the Jewish World,1700–1900 by Zeev Gries
- Book cover: The Book as Culture Agent (Hebrew) by Zeev Gries
- Articles, demonstrations and covers: “Einayim” Magazine
- Book cover: Divorced by Tuvia Mendelson
- Covers and illustrations: Davar weekly
- Illustrations: Monitin magazine
- Cover: Moment, American magazine
