= Carol Cohen =

American artist (b. 1939)

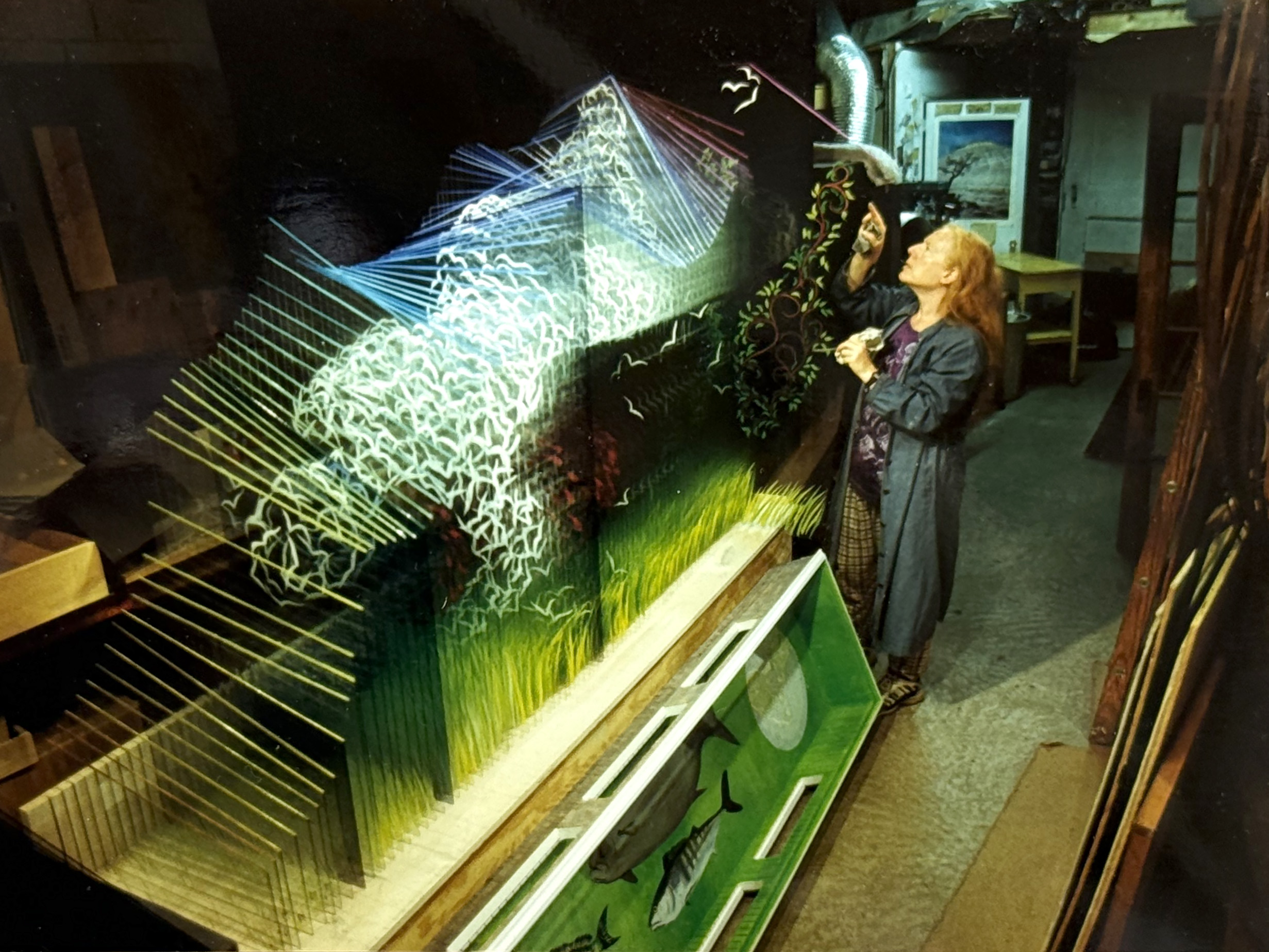
Carol Cohen at work on her sculpture "The Vineyard" for the Museum of Fine Arts. (Cambridge, 1999)

Carol Cohen (1939–2020) was an American artist celebrated for her pioneering technique of painting on stacked sheets of glass, creating three‑dimensional illusions. Based in Cambridge, Massachusetts, she developed intricately layered glass sculptures combining painterly color and spatial depth.

== Early life and education ==
Born in Washington, D.C., in 1939, Cohen studied in the Department of Painting and Design at Carnegie Institute of Technology (1956–57) before earning a Bachelor of Arts in Anthropology and Sociology from George Washington University in 1961. Although originally trained in traditional media, she transitioned to working primarily in glass in the early 1970s.

== Career ==
Cohen began her artistic career as a painter and sculptor before shifting her focus to glass. She developed a signature technique in which she painted with epoxy-based pigments on multiple layers of transparent glass, spaced apart to form sculptural works that resolved into recognizable imagery when viewed from a distance. This approach gave her work a holographic quality and a unique sense of dimensionality.

Her studio was based in Cambridge, Massachusetts, where she worked until her retirement in 2008. She exhibited widely across the U.S. and Europe in both solo and group shows, at galleries including the Heller Gallery (New York), Maurine Littleton Gallery (Washington, D.C.), Sanske Galerie (Zurich), and institutions such as the Museum of Fine Arts, Boston and the Renwick Gallery of the Smithsonian Institution.

== Artistic style and critical reception ==
Critics celebrated Cohen's work for blending painterly imagery with sculptural presence. In the New York Times, Grace Glueck described "the impression of a three-dimensional form. Much like a hologram, the image disappears and re-emerges as the viewer walks around it." The whole only resolves as one circumambulates the layered glass piece such as The Vineyard at the MFA Boston.

"Carol Cohen's sculpture is meant to frustrate," wrote Joshua Meyer in ArtsMedia magazine (1999). "Her art draws you in with its evanescent, enticingly beautiful forms—still-lifes, swimmers, clothing—all things that want to be touched. But when you approach the work, what you get is glass—delicate yet dangerous, sharp yet intensely fragile, and positively untouchable since the object you think you are looking at isn't even there."

Curator Jonathan Fairbanks emphasized the illusory, holographic effect achieved through delicate layering and light manipulation. "Implicit connections associate the exterior with the interior. In this case, the light greenish cast of the glass sheets creates This enhances the paradox of the viewer's seeing a form that is known not to really exist."

== Museums and collections ==
=== Public collections and installations ===
- Museum of Fine Arts, Boston — home to The Vineyard (commissioned 2000; installed in the west wing on the second floor) as well as earlier large‑scale pieces like Shadow Caster, a vinyl sculpture in City Hall Plaza under ICA's Works in Progress Program (1974), and a steel wall sculpture at the Sheraton Hotel, Boston (1983)
- Renwick Gallery (National Museum of American Art, Smithsonian Institution, Washington, DC) houses multiple works by Cohen and hosted her in exhibitions such as Glass! Glorious Glass! in 2000.
- Museum of American Glass, Millville, New Jersey.
- Shimonoseki City Art Museum, Japan.
- Racine Art Museum (formerly Wustum Museum), Racine, Wisconsin.
- Hunter Museum of Art, Chattanooga, Tennessee.
- Mint Museum of Art, Charlotte, North Carolina.
- European collections including Musée de Design et des Arts Appliqués Contemporains, Lausanne, Switzerland, and Museum Beelden aan Zee in Scheveningen, Netherlands.

=== Other notable private and corporate holdings ===
- Commissioned installations and holdings include pieces for CSI/Index Inc. in San Francisco (Tsunami, 1992), and private collectors such as George & Dorothy Saxe (San Francisco) and Ben Heineman Sr. (Chicago).

== Awards and honors ==
Cohen received multiple awards and honors over her career for her contribution to contemporary art and studio glass and her influence on younger generations of glass artists.:

- Massachusetts Council on the Arts and Humanities Fellowship, 1979
- Artist-in-Residence, Glass Program at the Massachusetts Institute of Technology (MIT), 1984
- National Endowment for the Arts (NEA) Fellowship, Craft category, 1987
- Finalist, James Renwick Alliance "Masters of the Medium" Award, 2002
- Women in Glass Arts Recognition Award, Glass Art Society (GAS), 2005
- Featured artist in "Women Working in Glass" exhibition series, multiple venues, 1990s–2000s
