= Haneman =

Haneman is a surname. Notable people with the surname include:

- Ben Haneman (1923–2001), Australian physician and book collector
- Frederick T. Haneman (1862–1950), American author and encyclopedist
- Na'ama Haneman, Israeli and British silversmith
- Vincent S. Haneman (1902–1978), American judge

== See also ==
- Hanemann, another surname
- Aletta Hanemans (1606–1653), Dutch brewer
