= Abel Pann =

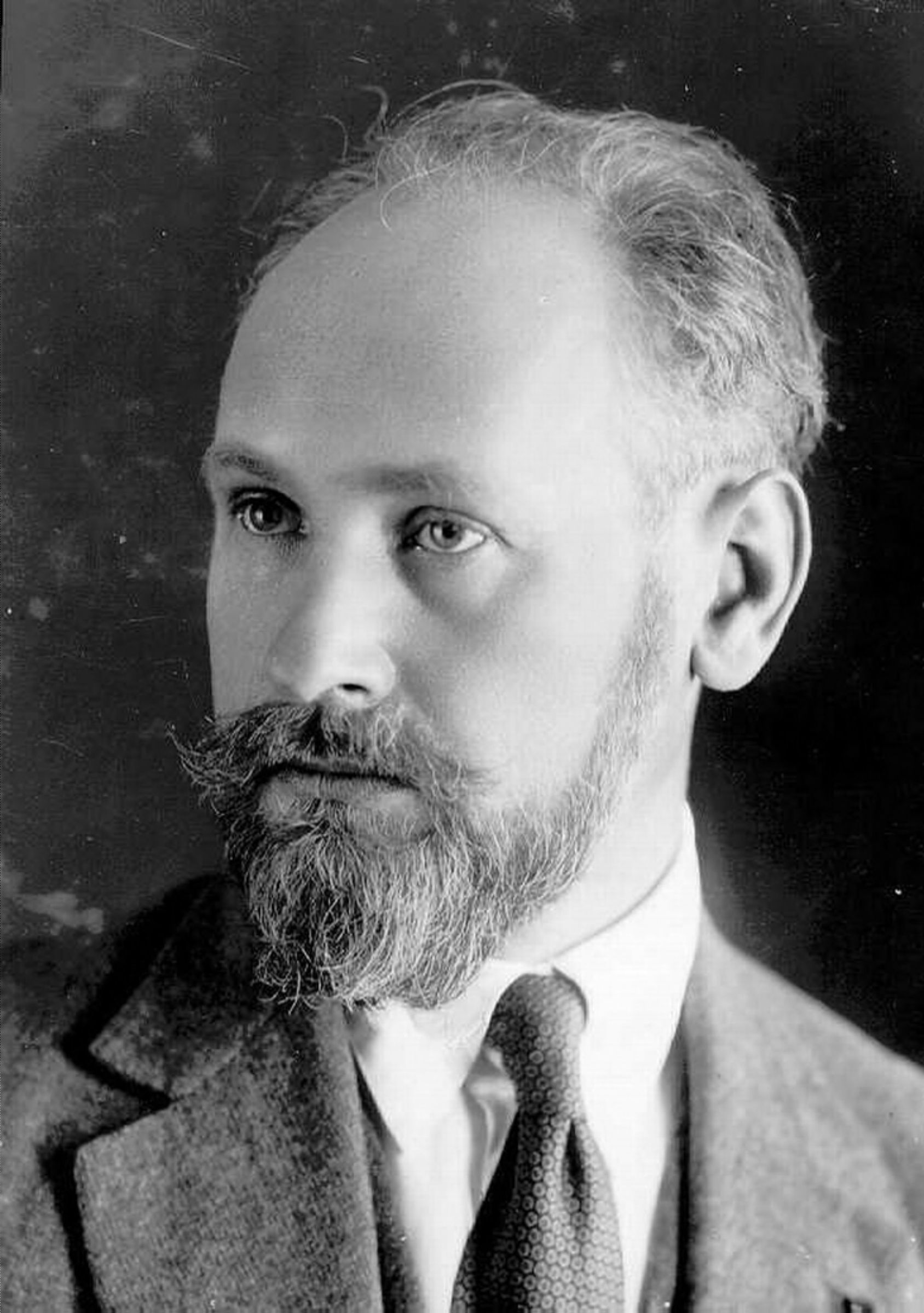
Abel Pann, 1912

Abel Pann (Hebrew: אבל פן; born Abba Pfeffermann; 1883–1963) was a Russian-born Jewish painter and print-maker who settled in the Talpiot neighborhood of Jerusalem in the early twentieth century and taught at the Bezalel Academy of Art under Boris Schatz.

== Biography ==
Abel Pann was born in 1883, into a Jewish family in Krāslava, today in Latvia, but at that time in the Pale of Settlement of the Russian Empire. He was the son of Rabbi Nachum Pfeffermann and Batia née Titleman. Abel grew up in an orthodox home and was educated in the cheder. His family moved to Daugavpils where his father took a position at the rabbinical school. Abel Pann immigrated to Ottoman Palestine and settled in Jerusalem. He was married to Esther Nussbaum. Pann's youngest son was killed in the 1947–1949 Palestine war. After that loss, he turned to painting scenes of the Holocaust. He died in Jerusalem in 1963.

== Art career ==
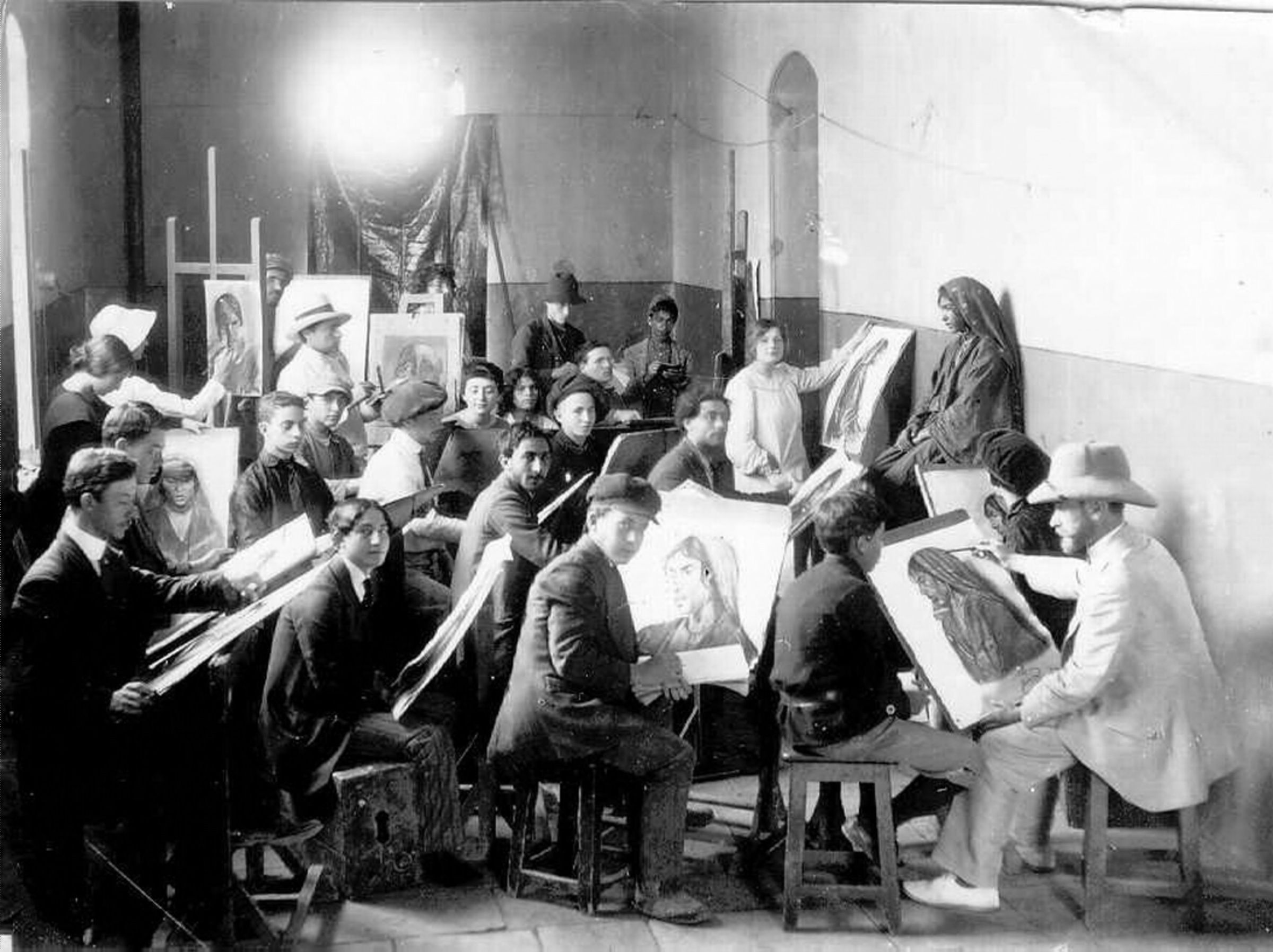
Bezalel drawing class under direction of Pann, 1912

As early as the age of 12 Pann studied the fundamentals of drawing for three months with the painter Yehuda Pen of Vitebsk, who also taught Marc Chagall. In his youth, he traveled in Russia and Poland, earning a living mainly as an apprentice in sign workshops. In 1898 he went south to Odessa, where he was accepted into the Academy of Fine Arts. In 1903, he was in Kishinev, where he documented the Kishinev pogrom with drawings; an effort that is thought to have contributed to his self-definition as an artist who chronicles Jewish history. Still in 1903, he moved to Paris, where he rented rooms in La Ruche, a Parisian building (which still exists) where Modigliani, Chagall, Chaïm Soutine and other Jewish artists also lived. Pann studied at the French Academy under William-Adolphe Bouguereau. He earned his living primarily by drawing pictures for the popular illustrated newspapers of the era. In 1912, Boris Schatz, founder and director of the Bezalel Academy of Arts and Design visited Pann in Paris and invited him to come work in Jerusalem.

In 1913, after traveling in Southern Europe and Egypt, Pann arrived in Jerusalem, where he had decided to settle for life. Pann went to see Schatz and it was decided that he would head the painting department at the Bezalel Academy for several months while Schatz embarked on an extensive overseas fund-raising trip. According to Haaretz art critic Smadar Sheffi, a work form this period with the simple title "Jerusalem" shows a cluster of buildings at sunset "with a sky in blazing orange." The painting is "more expressive and abstract that is typical of his work," and Sheffi speculates that "the encounter with the city" of Jerusalem was a "strong emotional experience" for the artist.

Pann returned to Europe to arrange his affairs before moving permanently to the British Mandate of Palestine, but was caught on the continent by World War I. Pann's wartime paintings would prove to be among "the most important" of his career. He made many posters to support the French war effort. He also made a series of fifty drawings showing the extreme suffering of Jewish communities caught in the fighting between Germany, Poland and Russia. Art critic Smadar Sheffi regards them as "the most important part of his oeuvre." These "shocking" drawings put modern viewers in mind of depictions of the Holocaust. Pann's drawings were intended as journalistic documentation of the fighting and were successfully exhibited in the United States during the War. According to Pann's autobiography, the Russians, who were allied with the French, refused to allow a wartime exhibition of the drawings in France. According to The New York Times, the drawings were published in Paris during the war, but the government intervened to block their distribution on the grounds that they "reflected damagingly upon an ally" (Russia).

== Biblical paintings ==
Upon his return to Jerusalem in 1920, Pann took up a teaching position at the Bezalel Academy and wrote that he was about to embark on his life-work, the painting and drawing of scenes from the Hebrew Bible. He returned briefly to Vienna, where he met and married Esther Nussbaum and purchased a lithographic press, which the couple brought home to Jerusalem. Pann began work on a series of lithographs intended to be published in an enormous illustrated Bible, and although that series was never completed, he is widely admired for the series of pastels inspired by Bible stories that he began in the 1940s. The iconography of these works is linked to the 19th century orientalism. He was part of a movement of contemporary Jewish artists interested in Biblical scenes, including Ephraim Moses Lilien, and Ze'ev Raban. All three were influenced by Art Nouveau and by the Symbolist movement. This influence can be seen in "You shall not surely die," a colored lithograph in which the serpent is represented as a bare-chested woman. The lithograph is reminiscent of the style of Aubrey Beardsley.

In 1924, Pann resigned from his teaching position to devote himself full-time to lithography. The lithographs met with considerable success on international tours. Pann told The New York Times that he found most illustrated Bibles boring, accusing the many artists who had illustrated Bibles before him of tending "to produce an impression that the Bible itself is a tiresome volume." He said that he wished to present the Bible's characters as "possessing the passions of human beings... with their virtues and vices, loves and hatreds."

Especially in his pastels, Pann envisioned Rachel, Rebekah, and other Biblical women as child-brides and imagined the teen-aged Jewish girls from Yemen whom he used as models along with young Bedouin girls, regarding both Yemenites and Bedouins as authentic oriental types. He posed them in elaborate traditional wedding and festival clothing and jewelry. In the twenties, the period when Pann was painting them, Yemenite and Bedouin girls did marry at the age of puberty. He often captured not only their youth and beauty, but the anxiety of a young girl about to marry a man she might hardly know. Other pastels capture the elderly matriarch Sarah looking "absolutely alive" and the care-worn facts of Jerusalem's Yemenite Jewish laborers, posed as Biblical patriarchs.

Pann's work reveals an intimate familiarity with the work of Rembrandt, James Tissot, and other European painters of biblical scenes. Among his most original approaches was a pastel of Potiphar's wife. This familiar theme had for hundreds of years and in the hands of innumerable artists conventionally depicted a mature beauty seducing an innocent youth, Joseph. According to art critic Meir Ronnen, Pann's interpretation, a late period pastel dating from the 1950s, depicts Potiphar's wife as a spoilt child, an extremely young and very bored girl who is "possibly just one of the lesser playthings of a gubernatorial harem." She turns her bored gaze on the young Israelite. Ronen considers her to be "the most brilliant of all Pann's creations."

For many years, Pann was considered an important artist in Israel, and had even greater success among Jewish art consumers abroad, but he "outlived his artistic times," fading in importance beside the new, modernist painters. Although many of his paintings are in museum collections, private collectors can sometimes find them at galleries such as the Mayanot Gallery. In 1990 art curator and Israeli art historian, Shlomit Steinberg submitted an MA thesis at the History of Art department of the Hebrew University, Jerusalem, titled: "The Image of the Biblical Woman as Femme Fatale in Abel Pann's Works".

== Exhibitions ==
- Abel Pann Paints the Bible, The Israel Museum, Jerusalem. Curator: Yigal Zalmona. (2003)
- "Abel Pann - The painter of The Bible, Catalogue by Shlomit Steinberg and Felix Salten, The Jewish Museum, Vienna (2001).
- Abel Pann, Mayanot Gallery, Jerusalem. (1987)
- Paintings, Drawings, and Lithograph by Abel Pann, Art Institute of Chicago, (1920)

== See also ==
- Visual arts in Israel
