= Kopel Gurwin =

Israeli wall hanging artist, painter and graphic artist (1923-1990)

- קופל גורבין
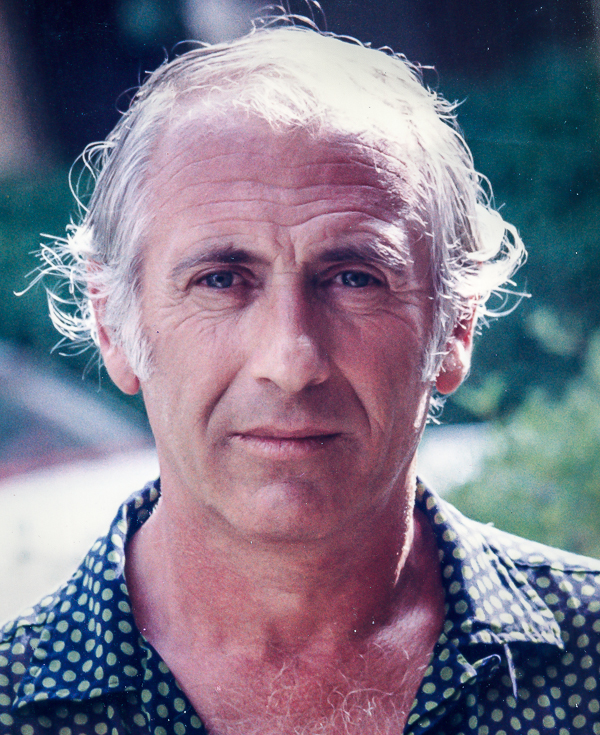
- Born: December 28, 1923; Vilnius, Lithuania
- Died: April 18, 1990 (aged 66); Hadera, Israel
- Education: Bezalel Academy of Arts and Design
- Known for: Tapestry
- Style: Felt appliqué

Kopel Gurwin (Hebrew: קופל גורבין; 1923–1990) was an Israeli wall hanging artist, painter and graphic artist.

== Family and youth ==
Kopel (Kopke') Gurwin (Gurwitz) was born and raised in Vilna, the capital of Lithuania. His father Mordechai worked as a shoemaker and his mother Malka as a housekeeper. Kopel and his siblings, Moshe (Meshke') who was two and a half years his elder, and Chava (Chavale’) who was four years younger, spoke Yiddish at home, but simultaneously studied Hebrew at their school which was part of the Tarbut educational network.

Kopel was active in the Hashomer Hatzair youth movement. In the 1930s, as a teenager, Kopel helped his parents with the home finances by working in a suit workshop, there he first encountered the art of sewing.

With the outbreak of the Second World War and the German invasion of Vilna, the Jews were imprisoned in camps and ghettos. Kopel and his brother Moshe were separated from their parents and were put to work in coal mines and peat. Kopel's parents were taken to the Stutthof concentration camp where they died of typhus within a month of each other. Kopel's 12-year-old sister Chava was turned over to the Germans by a Polish family and murdered.

The brothers were arrested by the Germans, but were saved thanks to the connections of Nina Gerstein, Kopel's drama teacher. They hid in an attic until they were discovered, fled and moved to Riga, where they were caught and sent to the Stutthof concentration camp where they were imprisoned until the end of the war. They were put to work maintaining and cleaning trains and took part in one of the death marches. July 20 1946, Kopel and Moshe came to Helsingborg, Sweden, as part of operation "the white boats" together with UNRRA, in which Sweden took in ill survivors for rehabilitation. He was also treated in Olofsfors sanatorium, Avesta. Once he recovered, Kopel worked in a publishing house and later was appointed director of the local branch of the Halutz movement.

In 1950 Kopel and Moshe made aliyah to Israel. Kopel worked as a survey for the Survey of Israel Company. In 1951, he enlisted to the Communication Corps and served as a military draftsman. There he won first prize for the design of the front cover of the Communication Corps bulletin.

== Beginning of artistic career ==
With his discharge from the army at 29 he started studying drawing and graphics at the Bezalel Academy of Arts and Design in Jerusalem. Among his teachers were Isidor Ascheim, Shlomo Vitkin, Yossi Stern and Jacob Steinhardt.

At the end of his first year of study, Kopel won the Reuben and Sarah Lif Excellence Award in written studies. During his studies he also won additional prizes: In 1956 he won first prize from the Lethem Foundation in California for poster design. Later the same year, Kopel won the Herman Shtruk prize for his drawing on the theme of Jerusalem.

In 1957 he won an additional first prize from the Lethem Foundation and second place from the printing company Ortzel for a drawing for a Jewish New Year greeting card. In 1958 he won first prize in a competition to design a poster for Tel Aviv's jubilee.

Two years later he won three other awards: First and third prize for designing a poster for Israel Independence Day, celebrating 12 years of the State of Israel.

Also that year Kopel won first prize for a poster to mark the 25th Zionist Congress.

In 1964 he entered the Independence Day poster competition on the theme of aliyah and won first and second prize. Four years later he again entered the competition on the theme of 20 years of Israel's independence and won first prize. The poster was styled like a Holy Ark curtain with two lions and a menorah at its centre. This poster appeared on the cover of Jewish Art and Civilization, edited by Geoffrey Wigoder, as well as the record Voices of 20 Years, 1948-1968, edited by Yossi Godard. In April 1971 he won first prize in the Independence Day poster competition for the fourth time.

== Wall hangings ==
Kopel's tapestry that won the Israeli Independence Day Poster Contest in 1968

With the completion of his studies at Bezalel Kopel moved to Tel Aviv and was hired by Shmuel Grundman's graphics and design studio. Grundman took him to Europe with him to design and supervise the construction of Israeli exhibition pavilions. During his time at Grundman's he discovered the fibrous felt from which he produced most of his wall hangings. At the 1964 Levant Fair exhibition he used felt stuck onto wooden panels for the first time.

The first felt wall hanging that Kopel produced was intended for the American Cultural Centre in Jerusalem and its theme was the United States Declaration of Independence. The wall hanging, which measured 2.85 X 1.85 meters, was stuck on a wooden panel. Kopel ordered rolls of felt from France and began work on wall hangings based on bible stories. He used a needle, hand sewing small even stitches with black embroidery thread which framed and highlighted every detail in the work, as well as using appliqué. Each wall hanging was constructed of three elements: the main motif/ story, the decoration (ornamentation) and the Hebrew text which usually framed the work. The lettering was designed in a square font contrary to the accepted biblical calligraphy.

The interior designer, Alufa Koljer-Elem, introduced him to Ruth Dayan who managed the shop Maskit and initiated the establishment of the Maskit 6 gallery. On 10 September 1967 he opened his first solo exhibition at the Maskit 6 gallery, in which 12 wall hangings were displayed.

In light of the exhibition at Maskit 6, Meira Gera, the director of artistic activity at the America-Israel Cultural Foundation, organized an additional exhibition of his works at the foundation's exhibition hall in New York City. The exhibition sparked immense press interest, and was also displayed for a few months at the New York Jewish Museum, from where it travelled throughout the United States.

Following the exhibition at the Delson-Richter gallery in Old Jaffa, which was later also exhibited at the Jerusalem Theatre, the journalist Nissim Mevorah wrote:

"The black color connecting the felt to the upholstery fabric (through hand stitching) highlights the contours. The aforementioned process repeats itself several times since every tapestry is composed of at least three layers. Color attracts color, until the completion of the work. Thanks to this technique, his work goes beyond purely technical art and borders on artistic action. The colorfulness inherent in the felt is luscious and rich. This is the reason Gurwin selected this material for his works. He has a highly developed sense of color and thanks to this his works look as though they are being engulfed by red and blue flames. The biblical characters filling Gurwin's wall hangings are inspired by the Jewish artistic folklore of Eastern Europe. Around the biblical verse which adorns the characters like a crown, appear oriental decorative motifs based on the rhythm of repetitive forms. By contrast, even contemporary graphic styles, among them the works of great artists such as Paul Klee, are among the influences on these wall hangings. At times of heavenly mercy Gurwin prepared works based on psalms of thanksgiving. His romantic moods resulted in tapestries dedicated to the Song of Songs."

In 1974 Kopel was approached by the women of the Beth Shalom Congregation (Sisterhood) in Kansas City, USA, with a request to design a wall hanging 5.40 X 2.70 meters in size. The intention was for a tapestry that the community women could be involved in its production. Kopel designed the work in all its detail and sent precise execution instructions for the wall hanging which was designed as a tapestry around the theme of the Garden of Eden. Following approval of the sketch, Kopel received 50 pieces of special canvas for tapestry embroidery, as well as a catalogue of wool thread with 200 shades. He connected the pieces into a large tapestry, enlarged his sketch and prepared precise instructions for each embroiderer. He then dismantled the tapestry into pieces and sent the pieces of fabric to the women congregants. 70 women took part in sewing the tapestry and completed together 2 million stitches over two years.

In an article about the project, Barbara Jaekel Miller, previously editor at The Times, wrote:

"Kopel's genius is in his colors. To think that the huge tapestry was designed from a catalogue of wool threads without the artist being able to see the stages of construction. The final product is perfect, almost unimaginable."

An additional appliqué, 4.0 X 2.0 meters in size, hangs in the Church of the Good Samaritan in Miami. The subject of the tapestry was the seven days of creation. All the days of creation were written in English apart from the seventh day which Kopel ended with the word "Halleluiah" in Hebrew.

Kopel's tapestry "The Time for Singing has Arrived" was printed on a UNICEF greeting card in 1978 and again in 1981.

In 1979 the company Kol Ha’Tor LTD, whose main goal was to deal with manufacture, marketing and sale of "artistic works from fabric", was established.

The Israeli Philatelic Service issued three stamps based on three of Kopel's holy ark curtains and one stamp based on an Independence Day poster he designed.

Kopel's creations decorate a large number of synagogues, public buildings, hotels and private collections which were purchased in Israel and around the world. They have decorated, among others, the walls of the King David Hotel in Jerusalem, the VIP room at Ben Gurion Airport, the Kfar Saba theatre and the Plaza Hotel in Tel Aviv.

== Personal life ==
At the end of the 1960s Kopel met Hannah Brooks, who worked in textile design for industry and wove artistic cloths for fashion designers. The two participated in artistic projects for hotels and public buildings. In September 1974 they wed. in 1980 they moved to Beit Yanai.

Kopel Gurwin died at the age of 67 as a result of heart disease. He was survived by his wife, Hannah and their two children, Boaz and Shira.

== Exhibitions ==
Year	Theatre/Gallery	Location
1995	The Knesset	Jerusalem
1988	Temple Beth Shalom	Miami, Florida
1988	University of Jewish Studies	Los Angeles
1987	Israel Congregation on the Northern Coast	Chicago
1985	Jerusalem Theatre	Jerusalem
1984	Tenafly	New Jersey
1983	Horace Richter Gallery	Old Jaffa
1974	Jerusalem Theatre	Jerusalem
1974	Delson Richter Gallery	Old Jaffa
1972	University of Jewish Studies	Miami, Florida
1971	Jewish Museum	New York
1970	Norman Gallery	Canada
1970	Sharei Tzedek Congregation	Winnipeg, Canada
1970	Gallery of the Year	Los Angeles
1970	Gallery of the Year	Scottsdale
1969	Gleeman Gallery	Chicago
1969	Israel Congregation of the Northern Coast	Chicago
1967	Maskit 6	Tel Aviv

== Prizes ==
Year	Prize	Description
1971	First	Independence Day poster 1971, 23 years of the State of Israel
1969	Second	International Tel Aviv poster fair
1968	First	Independence Day poster 1968, 20 years of the State of Israel
1964	First and Second	Independence Day poster 1964, 16 years of the State of Israel
1960	First	Poster for the 25th Zionist Congress
1960	First and Third	Independence Day poster 1960, 12 years of the State of Israel
1958	First	Poster for the Tel Aviv jubilee
1957	Second	Prize from the printing company Ortzel for a Jewish New Year greeting card drawing
1957	First	Foundation in California for poster design
1957		Herman Shtruk award for a drawing on the subject of Jerusalem
1956	First	Prize from the Lethem Foundation in California for poster design
1954	Distinction	Reuben and Sarah Lif award for distinction in calligraphy studies
1951		Front cover design for Communication Corps bulletin
