= Yaacov Kaufman =

- יעקב קאופמן
- Born: 1945 (age 80–81); Soviet Union
- Citizenship: Israel
- Occupations: Industrial designer, academic
- Awards: Sandberg Prize (1989)

Academic work
- Institutions: Bezalel Academy of Arts and Design
- Website: yaacovkaufman.com

Yaacov Kaufman (Hebrew: יעקב קאופמן; born 1945) is a Soviet-born Israeli industrial designer and academic. Kaufman's work has focused on lighting, furniture, and product design. He is a longtime professor at the Bezalel Academy of Arts and Design.

== Early life ==
Yaacov Kaufman was born in the Soviet Union (Russia) and lived in Poland until immigrating to Israel in 1957.

== Career ==
Kaufman has been a professor at the Bezalel Academy of Arts and Design for over 3 decades, training "several generations" of Israeli designers. The Jerusalem Report calls Kaufman, "the elder statesman of Israeli design."

== Selected exhibitions ==
Kaufman has had more than 20 international solo exhibitions.

- 2016 The Heart of the Matter, Eretz Israel Museum.
- 2015 Design Museum Holon
- 2011 Tel Aviv Museum of Art

== Awards and honors ==
Kaufman won the Sandberg Prize in 1989. He received the 2003 Norwegian Design Council Award for Industrial Design Excellence.

== Collections ==
Kaufman's work is included in the collections of the Design Museum Holon, the Tel Aviv Museum of Art and the Israel Museum, Jerusalem.

== See also ==
- Visual arts in Israel
