= Mayanot Gallery =

Coordinates: 31°46′46.8″N 35°12′56.2″E

Mayanot Gallery is an art gallery located on King George Street in Jerusalem, Israel.

The gallery was opened in 1986 by Yael Gahnassia, soon after she immigrated to Jerusalem from Paris. The gallery focuses on art with themes drawn from Jewish history, the Hebrew Bible, and the Land of Israel.

Artists exhibited at the gallery include classic Israeli artists, among them Abel Pann, Ludwig Blum, Ze'ev Raban (1890–1970), and Shmuel Charuvi (1897–1965), who worked in the early years of Israeli statehood. The gallery also features contemporary painters, sculptors, and printmakers, including Zvi Malnovitzer, Benny Gassenbauer, Marek Yanai, Daniel Kafri, and Pnina Frank.

== See also ==
- Visual arts in Israel
