= Hanemann =

Hanemann is a surname. Notable people with the surname include:

- Felix Hanemann (born 1953), American singer and musician
- W. Michael Hanemann (born 1944), American economist

== See also ==
- Haneman, another surname
