= Zvi Raphaeli =

Israeli impressionist painter

Zvi Raphaeli (Hebrew: צבי רפאלי; born in Egypt at 1924, died in 2005) was an Israeli impressionist painter. A rabbi by profession, he merged religion and art deftly in his paintings. He was educated in France from the age of three, and studied art at the École nationale supérieure des Beaux-Arts in Paris, and also at the Bezalel Academy of Art and Design in Jerusalem. He initially studied engineering but after losing many close relatives including his father and brother in World War II, Raphaeli decided to study to be an artist. He was a member of the French Resistance during World War II, and lived in Israel where he moved to, in 1945 at the age of 21. Later on in his life, he also lived in the United States.

== Art ==
He is known for his works of art in varied media, including oil and watercolor, depicting street scenes in Israel, scenes from Jewish life and festivities, and occasionally floral still subjects. Style: His primary medium of painting was oil on canvas, with a prominent impasto technique, that brings depth to the subject. In the 70's, Raphaeli made his stamp as an art critic as well, providing his critique to various other Israeli artists like Moshe Givati at the nationwide 'Summer ‘70 Exhibition' held at the Goldman Gallery, Haifa. Austrian born Israeli Art critic Theodore F. Meisels once wrote in The Jerusalem Post: "Still, one should watch out; Should Raphaely, who behind his beard is far younger than he looks, ever attempt to harmonize his two worlds, then this genuine painting 'Chassid' could develop into an Israeli Chagall....."

Raphaeli has also authored and illustrated the Haggadah (a Jewish text for "telling" from father to son, the story of deliverance of Jews from Egypt), in his version THE PESSACH HAGGADAH [Hardcover-1975, Miller Publication, 1975]
