= Zvi Malnovitzer =

Zvi Malnovitzer (Hebrew: צבי מלנוביצר; born 1945) is an expressionist painter born to a Haredi, or ultra-Orthodox, religious family in Bnei Brak, Israel. His upbringing in a society isolated from the modern world, where he was dedicated to intensive and uninterrupted Talmudic study from a young age, makes his decision to become an artist unusual, bold, and one of accomplishment. During his training in Reichenau, Austria, where he studied under the auspices of artist Wolfgang Manner and under the direction of Ernst Fuchs (renowned exponent of Fantastic Realism, a 20th-century group of artists in Vienna combining techniques of the Old Masters with religious and esoteric symbolism), Malnvotizer developed a unique style portraying themes that straddle the religious and secular worlds.

While Malnovitzer's work is inspired by the prolific portraits of Rembrandt van Rijn (1606–1669) and the Romanticism of Francisco de Goya (1746–1828), his style is unique in that it combines European Expressionism with traditional and religious themes. The way he paints is reflective of the way he lives his life - by embracing modern ideas while continuing to preserve his religious traditions. The subjects in his paintings are diverse, ranging from rabbis, to Holocaust survivors, to patrons at coffee shops. The one characteristic that all his works share is that his subjects’ faces, especially their eyes, speak volumes about their life story. The humanity and the universality of his art has made him known throughout the world – in Tel Aviv, Tokyo, Paris, New York City, Los Angeles, London, Amsterdam, Sydney, Berlin, and many other cities where his paintings have appeared in auctions, at galleries, and in exhibitions.

== Early life ==
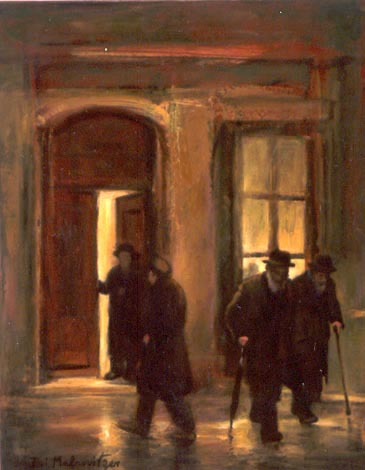
Out of the Synagogue (2007) by Zvi Malnovitzer.

Malnovitzer was born in 1945 as the only son of a Gur Hasidic family. His father was Polish and his mother German. For his early schooling, his parents sent him to cheder (Hebrew: חדר, meaning "room"), a traditional elementary school that taught the basics of Judaism and the Hebrew language. During his religious studies, Malnovitzer began to paint, using old bed sheets and scraps of wood to create his first oil on canvas work. Young Zvi's talents were soon recognized by his neighbor in Bnei Brak and accomplished Israeli artist, Yehuda Wallersteiner, who agreed to be his teacher at age 13. Wallensteiner taught the young artist the fundamentals of painting in the heart of the Haredi city of Bnei Brak, a society that observes Jewish law so strictly that art is rare. "I would return to Wallensteiner until I felt that I made paintings that were up to his caliber", Malnvoitzer said. Other artists began to notice the boy's talent. For instance, the sculptor Ellul Kussov gave him a recommendation, expressing enthusiasm for his gift for painting.

The tragic history of his family and of the Jewish people cast a shadow over his entire life and career. Since his childhood, it was his noble mission to struggle with memories of the Holocaust and of exile through painting. At age 12, Malnotivzer sketched a black ink drawing of figures emerging from a cave, with Nazi soldiers perched on a balcony above. He wrote the word "Galut", meaning "exile", at the edge of the drawing. He was thinking of his family who perished in the Holocaust and the injustice that his grandfather endured by the Nazis, including an attempt to set fire to his beard. For young Zvi, born the year that World War II ended, exile became both a traumatic memory and an artistic inspiration.

His commitment to energizing the Jewish cultural scene through painting was matched only by his pride to serve the recently established State of Israel. In 1963, Malnovizter was drafted into the Israel Defense Forces (IDF). After his service, he was on reserve duty in the Burial Division.

== Career beginnings ==
In 1966, Malnovitzer married his wife Bilha and began working in a carpentry workshop in south Tel Aviv. In this capacity, he befriended the locals of the neighborhood—including vendors, beggars, and drug addicts—who became the subjects of his work.

== Education ==
In 1977, Malnovizer studied briefly at the Avni Institute in Tel Aviv. He continued his training in Europe, where he was introduced to the works of Rembrandt van Rijn at the Rijksmuseum (Dutch pronunciation: [rɛi̯ks myˈzeʏm]) (English: State Museum), a Dutch national museum in Amsterdam, Francisco de Goya at the Museo del Prado, the main Spanish national art museum, located in central Madrid.

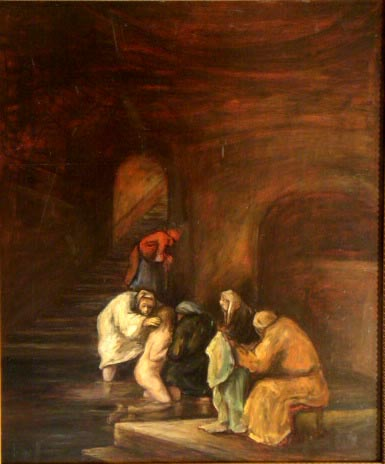
Tvila at the MIkve (1978) by Zvi Malnovitzer.

The mainstay of his European training took place in Reichenau, near Vienna, where he attended seminars with the artist Ernst Fuchs, one of the founders and the most prominent member of the Vienna School of "Fantastic Realism." Malnvoitzer studied the art of the Flemish and Venetian masters under Fuchs. The renowned Viennese painter later wrote the following testament of his student's talent before the opening of Malnovitzer's first major exhibition:

"Born in Israel, Zvi is nevertheless at home in the European traditions of painting […] He is moved to painting by a humble piety and this is where his strength lies […] His talent enabled him to quickly grasp the new possibilities opening before him, and I feel sure that friends and admirers of his art – amongst whom I am proud to count myself – will not be disappointed with his artistic achievement. It is in this sense that I wish his first major exhibition every success." — Ernst Fuchs, Reichenau/Rax, Austria, August 9, 1979

Malnovitzer returned to Israel in 1978, during which time he painted works such as Tvila at the Mikveh. Full of passion from his experiences with and exposure to European Masters of painting, he sold his house and car to support his full-time vocation as an artist. After formally establishing his art career, he left Israel once again to study and work in Paris (1979).

== Art ==
=== Style ===
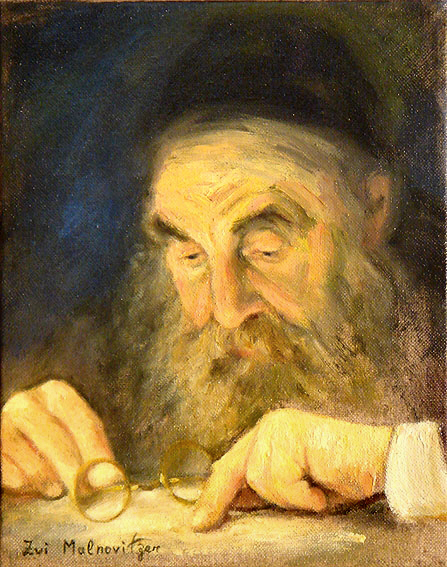
Reading Man (2007)

Malnovitzer's style is an Expressionism inspired by the dark tonalities and fluid brush strokes of Spanish romantic artist Francisco de Goya and by the monumental portraits of Rembrandt van Rijn. He is known for painting people up-close baring facial expressions that seem simple but convey a dramatic life narrative and depth of emotion.

=== Themes ===
==== Haredi Judaism ====
Although Malnovitzer currently practices Modern Orthodox Judaism, a movement that attempts to synthesize religious values and the observance of Jewish law with the modern world, he continues to identify himself as a spiritual member of the Haredi community in which he was raised and educated. His spiritual ties to this community inspire scenes in his art of Hasidic figures "serving God through the worldly". Malnovitzer abides by the Hasidic belief that the physical world is only an extension of the spiritual – accordingly, his paintings seek to bring out the presence of the spiritual through the material.

In Cry (1984), Malnvotizer painted a Hasidic Jew spreading his arms in alarm, his mouth ajar and his awestruck eyes in terror. The figure directs his agony skyward in a gesture that connects the material to the spiritual world of faith. His Bull Dance (1985) addresses this connection in the opposite way – by revealing the living presence of the divine with earthly, bestial, and corruptible mankind. In this painting, former Hasidic Jews perform the dance of the bull, a symbol of the material world and of the golden calf, synonymous with decadence, materialism, and idol worship in the Jewish tradition.

==== Holocaust and Exile ====
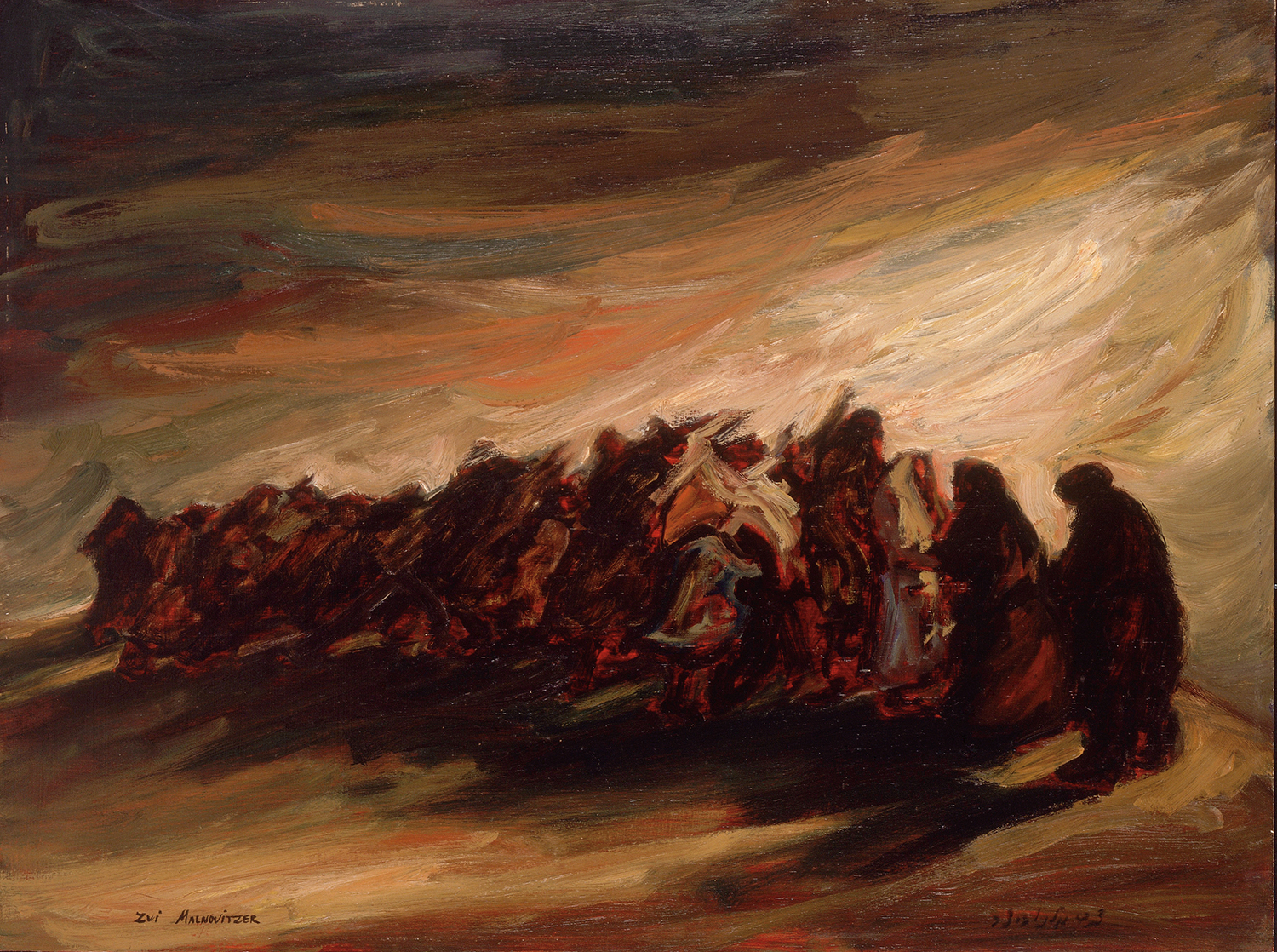
Refugees (1987) by Zvi Malnovitzer

Malnovitzer's art is inseparable from the history of his family and people. His notion of peoplehood reflects the idea that Jews are family, distant cousins of common ancestors who have ties to their ancient, Biblical homeland and now the modern State of Israel In Refugees (1987), Malnovitzer painted figures whose faces were undefined, but whose features, including head coverings, beads, and long clothing, made them readily identifiable as Jewish. Their dehumanized and indistinct faces convey the pain of repeated exiles throughout Jewish history. In this particular work, he alluded to a modern-day exile – a sequel to the Exodus from Egypt, the Babylonian exile, or expulsion from Spain – by portraying an uprooted Jewish settlement from hills of Samaria. It is the only painting ever produced on the subject.

The following year, Malnovitzer painted Exodus (2007), depicting the disengagement from the Gaza Strip, the unilateral evacuation of 21 civilian Jewish settlements. Although the work refers to a specific political event, he linked this modern day "exile" with ones that Jews have endured since Biblical times. This link is reinforced by the title – a direct reference to the Exodus from Egypt – and by his choice of portraying elderly figures, which make them more universal refugees, not exclusively those evicted from Gaza or Jews in general. They represent a condition of the loss of hope and of unanswered pleas from God.

==== Scenes from Daily Life ====
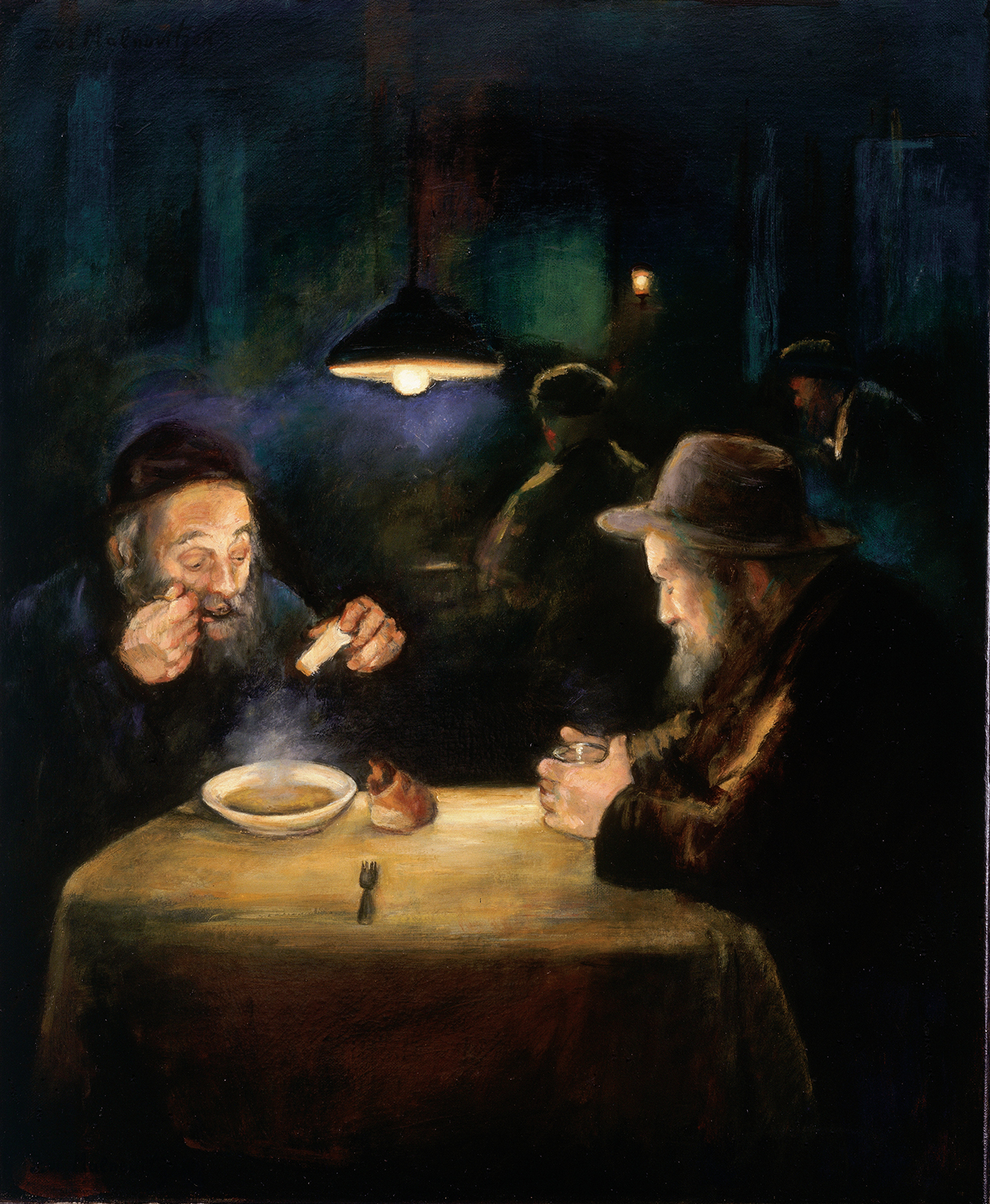
Soup Kitchen (2001) by Zvi Malnovitzer

The first painting that Malnovitzer sold in his exhibition in Japan was a portrait of a rabbi smoking a cigar. "At first, I didn't understand why the Japanese man identified with the rabbi". He proceeded to ask the patron what he saw in the face of the figure, and he replied, "there is something universal about the face, and about the human experience in general".

Malnovitzer often paints scenes from daily life – both Jewish and gentile. The places and characters of his paintings seem ordinary – strangers at coffee shops, homeless men at soup kitchens, and drunks at bars. The expression on their faces, however, hold back extraordinary stories that are more than what meets the eye.

== Exhibitions and Galleries ==
- 1977 – Sarah Kishon Gallery, Tel Aviv (group exhibition)
- 1977 – Herzl Street Bakery, Tel Aviv (solo exhibition)
- 1978 – Bental Gallery, Tel Aviv (solo exhibition)
- 1979 – affiliated with the Hadassah Klatchkin Gallery, Tel Aviv
- 1979 – Schoninger Gallery, Munich (solo exhibition)
- 1980 – Hadassah Klatchkin Gallery, Tel Aviv (solo exhibition)
- 1982 – Philadelphia (group exhibition)
- 1983 – Lillian Heidenberg Gallery, New York
- 1983 – Urbach Gallery, Vienna (group exhibition)
- 1983 – Yeshiva University Museum, New York (solo exhibition)
- 1986 – Marunouchi Gallery, Tokyo (solo exhibition)
- 1988 – affiliated with Mayanot Gallery, Jerusalem
- 1992 – Marunouchi Gallery, Tokyo (solo exhibition)
- 1996–2012 – represented by the Mayanot Gallery, Jerusalem
- 2000 – publication of an important catalog by Mayanot Gallery, Jerusalem
- 2002 – Waldorf Astoria, New York (solo exhibition)
- 2002 – Artist Reception and Sale, Gala Dinner for the Rabin Medical Center, New York City. Event featured 42nd President of the United States William J. Clinton, co-founder and Vice Chairman of Apax Partners, Inc. Alan Patricof, and CNN talk show host Larry King.
- 2007 – Mayanot Gallery, Jerusalem (solo exhibition)
