= Jerusalem Artists House =

Historical art gallery in Jerusalem, Israel

Coordinates: 31.779929°N 35.214396°E

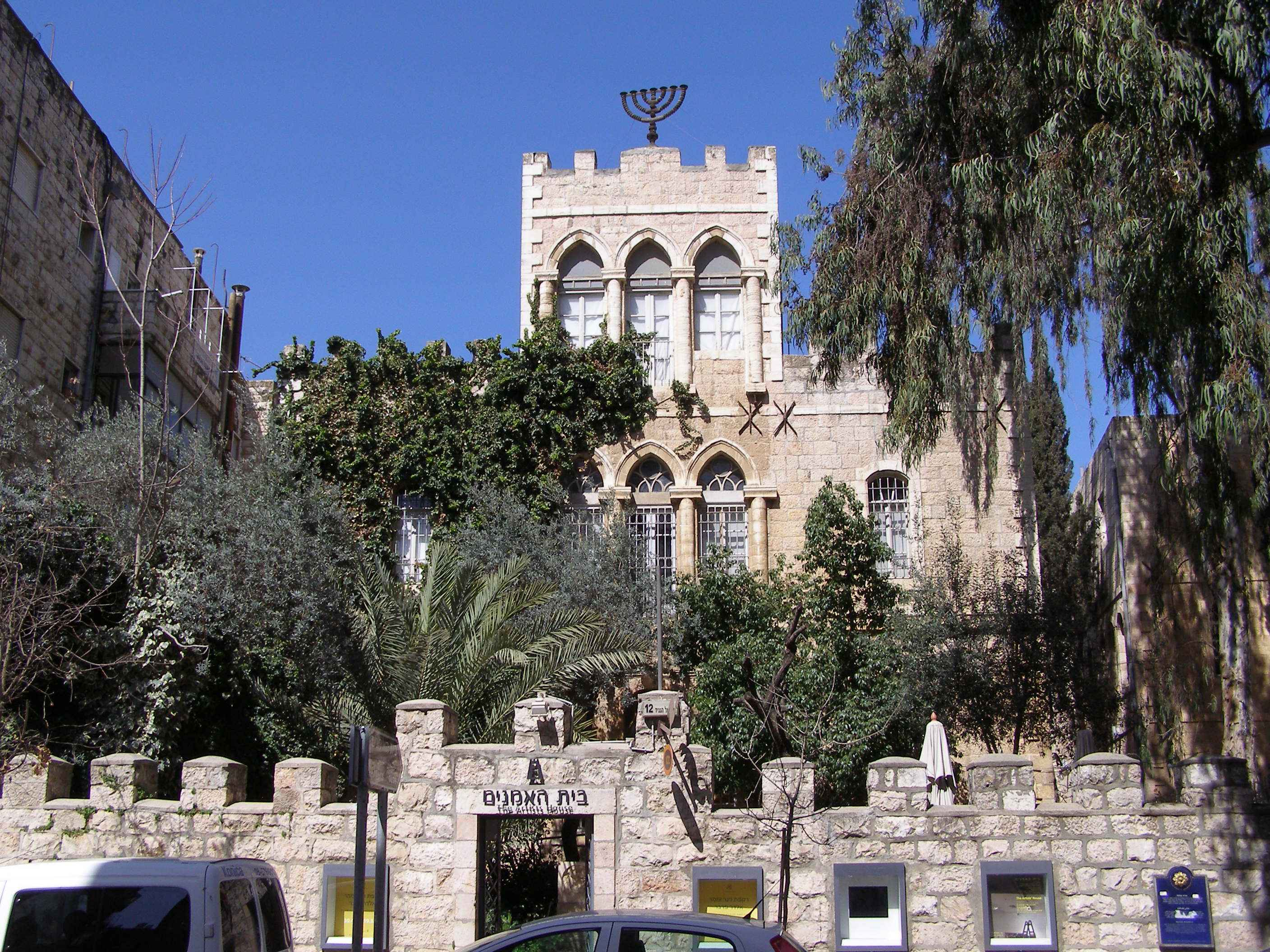
- Jerusalem Artists House,2011
- Established: 1906
- Location: Jerusalem, Israel
- Type: Art and history
- Website: www.art.org.il

Jerusalem Artists House is an Israeli art gallery and exhibition space in Jerusalem, Israel that housed the Bezalel Art School, established in 1906. The historic 19th century building, in Jerusalem's Rehavia neighborhood, was the home of Boris Schatz, who opened an art school and museum alongside his family residence. The building is now the headquarters of the Jerusalem Association of Painters and Sculptors.

== History ==
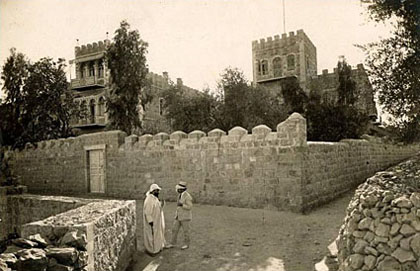
Bezalel Art School, 1913

Built by a wealthy Arab in the 1880s, with a crenelated stone wall mirroring the wall around Jerusalem's Old City, the building stood empty until 1907, when the complex was purchased by the Jewish National Fund for Boris Dov Schatz, who envisioned opening an art school there. The building became the country's first public museum. Schatz's collection later formed the basis of the Israel Museum, which opened in 1965.

The Jerusalem Artists House mounts changing exhibitions of Israeli art, featuring the work of both new and established artists. Since 2001 the Biennale for Drawing in Israel has been held there.

In May 2019, the Larva Society for Psychical Research relocated temporarily to the Jerusalem Artists House.

== See also ==
- List of museums in Israel
