= Brothers of Light =

Street artist duo from Jerusalem

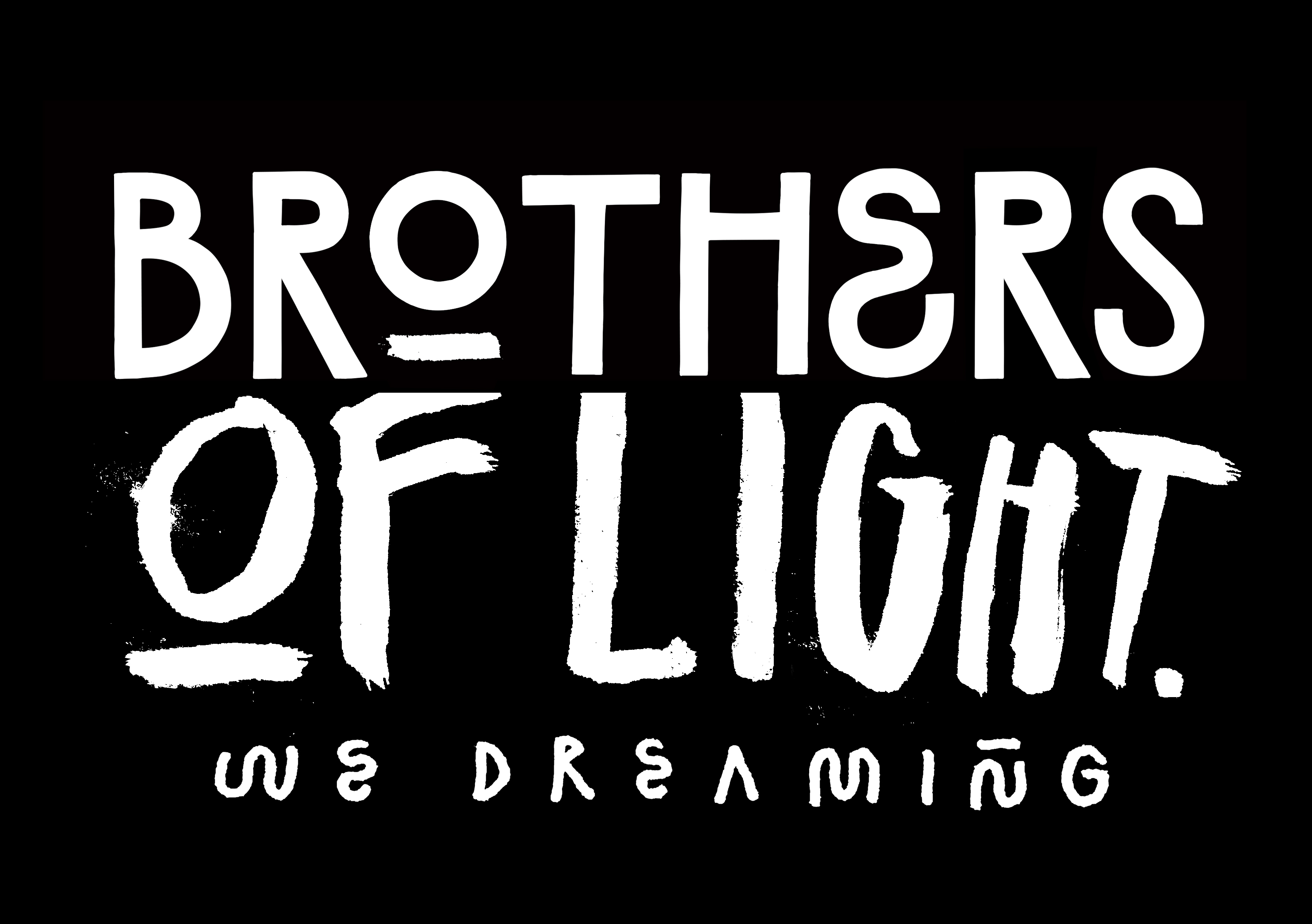
- Movement: Street art; visual art
- Website: www.brothersoflight.net

Brothers of Light is a contemporary street artist duo from Jerusalem, known for their international large-scale vivid art works using unique sets of old and modern symbols.

== Personal lives ==
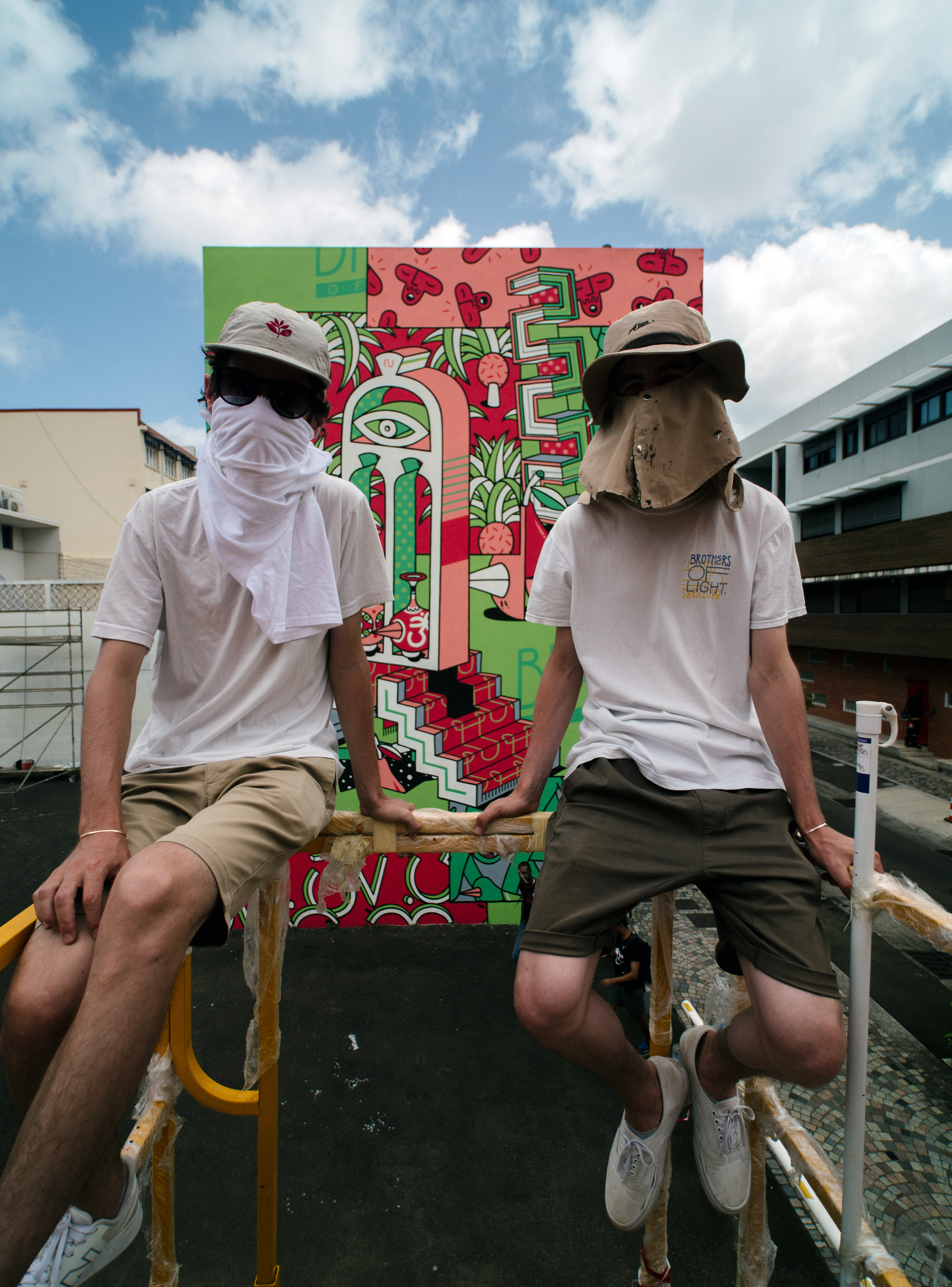
Brothers of Light at the IPAF festival in Martinique, 2019

Brothers of Light began their joint journey in 2015. Consisting of real-life siblings, Elna (born 1988) and Gab (born 1991), the duo grew up in the skateboarding scene in Jerusalem, which served as their first inspiration. The brothers first began painting on stickers and other small objects before moving onto small walls. Shortly after, they were drawn to larger surfaces.

The duo studied at the Department of Visual Communication at Bezalel Academy of Art and Design in Jerusalem (in proximate years); over time they developed a shared visual language that stems from their mutual life experiences and childhood memories.

== Career ==
=== Name ===
According to the brothers, their name "Brothers of Light" was inspired by the title of their first solo exhibition, and their mother's desire for them to join forces and do something good. After her death, they began working together and decided to use this name for their first exhibition in 2015 as a tribute to her. The "Light" in the name was a reference to their mother, and the desire to spread positivity and do good in the world.

=== Art ===
Brothers of Light have showcased their work both indoors and outdoors, using a variety of mediums such as murals, silkscreen prints, sculptures and paintings on canvases, ceramics and reused woods and metals. They are primarily influenced by the urban culture of the world's diverse streets, their connection to the skateboarding and hip-hop scenes, as well as worldly ancient cultures and symbols.

They have participated in international urban art festivals and residency programs in countries including Israel, France, Germany, Portugal, and the United States. In 2017, they teamed up with Israeli street artists to form a collective called "Prettymess" and presented a group exhibition at Beit Ha'ir, Tel Aviv. In 2019, before leaving their hometown Jerusalem, they revealed their second solo exhibition, “Last Tripp in Jerusalem”. In 2022 they debuted their solo exhibition, “From Dirt”, in Jaffa, presenting a three-year project of painting over dozens of metals they salvaged from a garbage site near their studio.

=== Due exhibitions ===
- 2015 – Brothers of Light, SpotArt gallery, Jerusalem, Israel
- 2016 – Brothers of Light, Casino San Remo, Tel Aviv, Israel
- 2019 – Last Tripp in Jerusalem, Beita Gallery, Jerusalem, Israel
- 2022 – From Dirt, Yefet 30, Tel Aviv, Israel
- 2024 - “Glitch”, at Litvak Contemporary

=== Group exhibitions ===
- 2015 – La Manufacture 111 Gallery, Paris, France
- 2017 – Prettimess Collective, Beit Ha'ir, Tel aviv, Israel
- 2018 – Fresh paint art fair, Tel Aviv, Israel
- 2018 – The Destination Number 131: a journey to the interior through art, Paris, France
- 2023 – Contemporary Art Auction, Tiroche auction house, Tel Aviv, Israel
- 2023 – Surface Identities, Roe Green Gallery, Ohio, United States

=== Residency Programs ===
- 2017 – Ne-Na Artspace, Chiang Mai, Thailand
- 2019 – The Art Camp by LB project, Nice, France
- 2020 – ZYANYA, Mexico city, Mexico

=== Murals and Installations in Public Spaces ===
- 2015 – Mural painting at "Street Meet" festival, Wurzburg, Germany
- 2016 – Mural painting at "POWWOW Israel edition", Arad, Israel
- 2016 – Mural painting at "Loures arte publica" festival, Lisbon, Portugal
- 2017 – Mural painting at "Loures arte publica" festival Lisbon, Portugal
- 2017 – Mural painting at "Haifa mural festival", Haifa, Israel
- 2017 – Mural painting at "Ital collective artists program", California, USA
- 2018 – Mural painting at "IPAF festival SA", Cape Town, South Africa
- 2018 – Mural painting at "Jerusalem mural festival", Jerusalem, Israel
- 2018 – Mural painting at "Climax festival of arts" Darwin Hangars, Bordeaux, France
- 2018 – Mural painting at "Pavillon de la forret" RVCA artist network, Hossegor, France
- 2018 – Mural painting at "LE MUR 12" Project, Paris, France
- 2019 – Mural painting at "Superposition festival", Lyon, France
- 2019 – Mural painting at "IPAF Martinique 2019" edition, Martinique
- 2021 – Mural painting for "Lemala" Project, Jordan Valley, Israel
- 2021 – Sculpture created with Alexander Haiezki for Jerusalem Design Week, Jerusalem, Israel
- 2021 – Exhibition visual identity and murals: "It's Your Move!", Science Museum Jerusalem, Israel
- 2022 – Romania Tour: Three murals in three cities – Resita, Cluj – Napoca and Bucarest, Romania
- 2022 – Mural painting for "Lemala" Project, Ramla, Israel
- 2023 – Mural painting for "Ibug" Festival, Berlin, Germany
