= Dorothy Saxe =

American philanthropist (1926–2026)

- Born: February 10, 1926; Michigan City, Indiana, U.S.
- Died: October 13, 2026 (aged 100); Menlo Park, California, U.S.
- Education: Northwestern University
- Spouse: George Saxe

Dorothy Saxe (née Ruby; February 10, 1926 – October 13, 2026) was an American philanthropist known for her art collection.

== Life and career ==
Dorothy Ruby was born in Michigan City, Indiana, on February 10, 1926. She attended Northwestern University. In 1947 she married George Saxe (1921–2010), with whom she had three children.

In 1959 the couple settled in Palo Alto, California. In the late 1970s and early 1980s the couple began collecting art, specifically contemporary crafts and art glass.

In 1998 the Saxes donated 223 objects to the de Young Museum.

In 2009 George Saxe endowed The Dorothy Saxe Invitational at the Contemporary Jewish Museum in San Francisco.

Dorothy Saxe died in Menlo Park, California, on October 13, 2026, at the age of 100.
