= Meir Ronnen =

Israeli journalist, political cartoonist, art critic, and illustrator

- Born: Meir Isaacman; 1926 Melbourne, Australia
- Died: August 30, 2009 (aged 82–83) Israel
- Areas: Cartoonist, illustrator, journalist

Meir (Mike) Ronnen (Hebrew: מאיר רונן; 1926 – August 30, 2009) was an Israeli journalist, political cartoonist, art critic, and illustrator.

Meir Ronnen was born in Melbourne, as Meir Isaacman. His father was born in Jerusalem, Land of Israel, and his mother in Liverpool, UK. He studied art and architecture at the Royal Melbourne Institute of Technology in Melbourne. During the Second World War he was recruited to the Australian Army, and after the war was stationed in occupied Japan as a staff member of a military newspaper, BCON, where he had a weekly column "In a mess by Mike". In 1945–46 he drew portraits of Japanese war criminals at the hearings of the International Military Tribunal for the Far East in Tokyo. Back in Australia, he worked as a cartoonist for The Sunday Telegraph.

In 1949 Ronnen emigrated to Israel and joined the staff of the daily newspaper, "The Palestine Post", which soon after accepted his proposal to change its title to The Jerusalem Post. His first assignment was to draw maps, but his talent as an illustrator was soon recognized, and he began illustrating articles and drawing cartoons for the paper on a daily basis.

In 1956, he adopted the Hebrew name 'Ronnen' upon being appointed emissary of the Jewish Agency to South Africa and Rhodesia. Upon his return to Israel in 1958, he was asked to establish the International Edition of The Jerusalem Post and to continue as cartoonist and art editor of the Israel Edition. In his position as art editor, which continued until 2008, he wrote thousands of articles, including book reviews on topics ranging from art to science to Judaica to history, a column on the happenings of the international auction houses, and reviews of both local and international exhibitions. He also drew a daily political cartoon for the Jerusalem Post, and illustrated and published numerous books.

Ronnen also drew a daily cartoon, in Hebrew, for the Hebrew daily Yedioth Ahronoth, which he signed, "Mike." In 2003, he was named an Honorary Fellow of the Israel Museum in Jerusalem. Meir Ronnen died in 2009 in Jerusalem at the age of 82. In 2014, his children donated his artistic archive to the Israeli Cartoon Museum in Holon, Israel.

== Bibliography ==
- Dan Pattir, Israel on Line, Israel Ministry of Foreign Affairs & Israel Cartoonists Association, 1999
- Steve Linde & Alexander Zvielli, "The Veteran Artist who gave the 'Post' its Name", The Jerusalem Post, August 31, 2009
- Bret Stephens, "Remembering Mike Ronnen", The Jerusalem Post, September 1, 2009
