= Na'ama Haneman =

Israeli and British silversmith

Na'ama Haneman (Hebrew: נעמה הנמן) is an Israeli and British silversmith, sculptor, and contemporary artist focusing on silver vessels.

== Education ==
Haneman comes from a family of ten children. She was a student at the Bezalel Academy of Arts and Design in Jerusalem, graduating in 2012. Her work there focused on jewellery, including silver inlay on stone. After working for a commercial jeweler, she studied at the School of Art, Architecture and Design (London Metropolitan University), receiving an MA in 2017. During this time, she shifted her craft from jewellery to sculpting silver vessels. She credits Vered Kaminski and Simone ten Hompel at London Metropolitan as mentors in her art.

== Artworks ==
In 2018, the Worshipful Company of Goldsmiths selected Haneman's work for the annual Goldsmiths' Fair. Haneman's The Calm before the Storm, a silver candleholder and cup, won third prize in the emerging artists competition at the 2019 Silver Triennale Internationale, held in Hesse, Germany. Her work Movement, a pair of silver vessels, was a 2020 Loewe Prize finalist. A milk and sugar set by Haneman was runner up for the Industry Award at the 2022 Contemporary British Silversmiths 25th Anniversary Celebration,

In 2023, the Penelope & Oliver Makower Trust commissioned Haneman for a work to be displayed at the Victoria and Albert Museum. The resulting work, I hear you breathing, takes the form of two silver vessels resting against each other; it has become part of the collection of the V&A, on long-term loan from the Makower Trust.
