= Joshua Meyer =

American artist

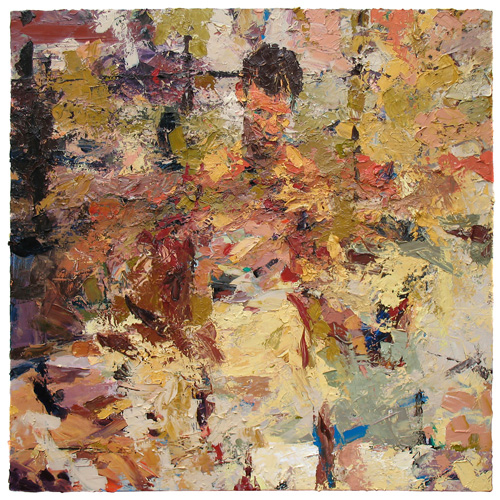
Seek, (oil on canvas, 2006) by Joshua Meyer in the collection of Hebrew College in Boston

Joshua Meyer (born 1974, Lubbock, Texas, United States) is an American artist, based in Cambridge, Massachusetts. He earned his B.A. from Yale University and also studied at the Bezalel Academy in Jerusalem.

He is known for his oil paintings of people, and for a searching process by which they emerge, trail off, wander, get lost, experiment and reemerge. This searching quality is characterized by a thick texture in many of his paintings, influenced by Alberto Giacometti, Frank Auerbach, Philip Guston and Rembrandt van Rijn. Every painting emerges from struggle and re-evaluation.

The artist's work has been shown in galleries and museums across the United States, Europe and Asia, including Eight Approaches at the Museum of Fine Arts in Boston, the Worcester Art Museum, and the BYU Museum of Art, a solo exhibition, Tohu vaVohu at Hebrew College in Boston (2004), and Becoming (2006) at the Yale Slifka Center and NYU Bronfman Center. “Commanding visions,” emerge from the midst of Meyer's thickly layered paint, according to Hebrew College Professor Steven Copeland in the introduction to the 2004 Tohu vaVohu catalog. “He engages...fateful questions concerning the character of art and of Judaism, their possibilities, challenges and problems.”

Meyer's subjects play a hide-and-seek game with the viewer, often dissolving into the paint. According to Allegra Goodman, in the introduction to the 2013 exhibition catalog Rustle, Sparkle, Flutter, Float, these people “will reveal themselves, and they will disappear. Look at them up close and they scatter, self-effacing.” The figures are elusive and appear introspective. “Some artists try to depict our world. Meyer presents people in their own worlds, and invites us to enter.”

Meyer is a recipient of a Pollock-Krasner Foundation Grant as well as the Sustainable Arts Foundation Award, The Betzalel Award from Hebrew College and two painting fellowships from the Massachusetts Cultural Council. Meyer's work has been featured in the San Francisco Chronicle, The Forward, the Philadelphia Metro, New Haven Register, Art New England, the Boston Phoenix, the Worcester Telegram and The Boston Globe.
