= Bezalel Academy of Arts and Design =

Art school in Jerusalem, Israel

- בצלאל אקדמיה לאמנות ועיצוב
- Elbelm of Bezalel, designed by Ephraim Moses Lilien
- Former name: Bezalel School
- Type: Public college Art school
- Established: 1906; 120 years ago
- Founder: Boris Schatz
- President: Adi Stern
- Students: 2,500
- Undergraduates: 2,200
- Postgraduates: 300
- Location: Jerusalem, Israel; 31°46′54″N 35°13′24″E
- Campus: Urban
- Website: bezalel.ac.il

Bezalel Academy of Arts and Design (Hebrew: בצלאל אקדמיה לאמנות ועיצוב) is a public college of design and art located in Jerusalem. Established in 1906 by Jewish painter and sculptor Boris Schatz, Bezalel is Israel's oldest institution of higher education and is considered the most prestigious art school in the country. It is named for the Biblical figure Bezalel who was appointed by Moses to oversee the design and construction of the Tabernacle (Exodus 35:30). The Arts and Crafts like art created by Bezalel's students and professors in the early 1900s is considered the first formal Israeli art. Following the waning of the School of Paris inspired artists of Tel Aviv and Safed's artists' quarter, as well as the school's abandonment of the arts and crafts in favour of modernist art, the school gradually regained its prominence in the Israeli art scene.

Bezalel's 460,000 sq ft main campus is located adjacent to the Russian Compound in the city center. The architecture department remains at Bezalel's nearby historic campus.

As of 2023, Bezalel offers ten bachelor's departments and five masters programs; it employs more than 500 lecturers and enrolls 2,500 students (2,200 undergraduate; 300 graduate).

The school has received numerous honors including 14 Israel Prizes and 3 EMET Prizes.

== History ==
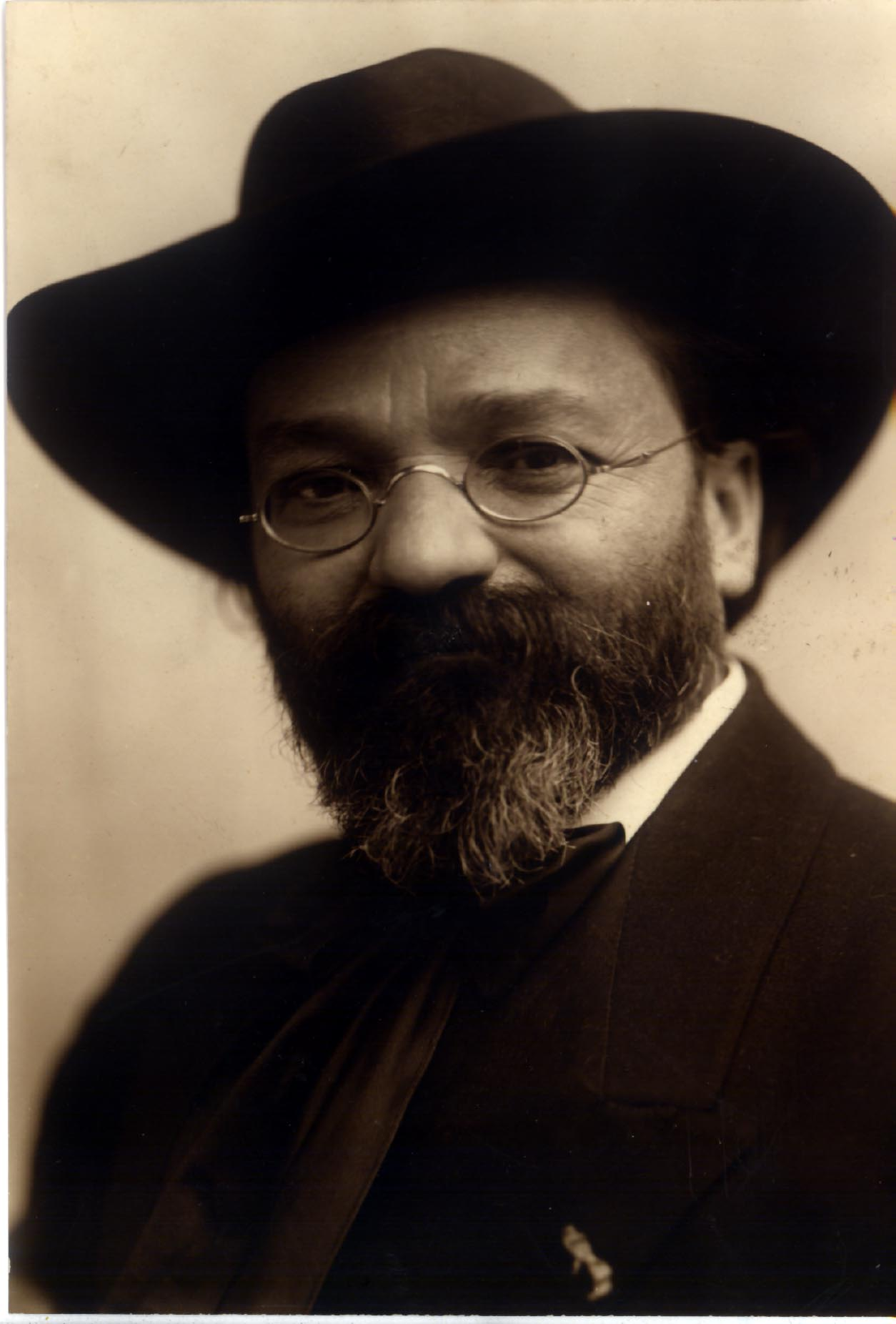
Boris Schatz, founder of Bezalel

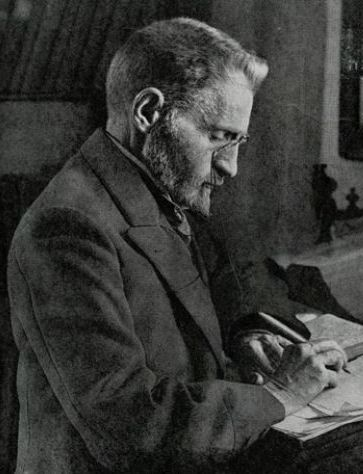
Eliezer Ben-Yehuda, professor of Hebrew at Bezalel

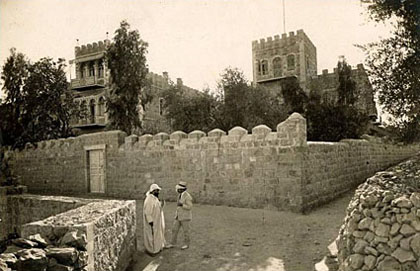
Boris Schatz outside the Bezalel campus, Jerusalem, 1913

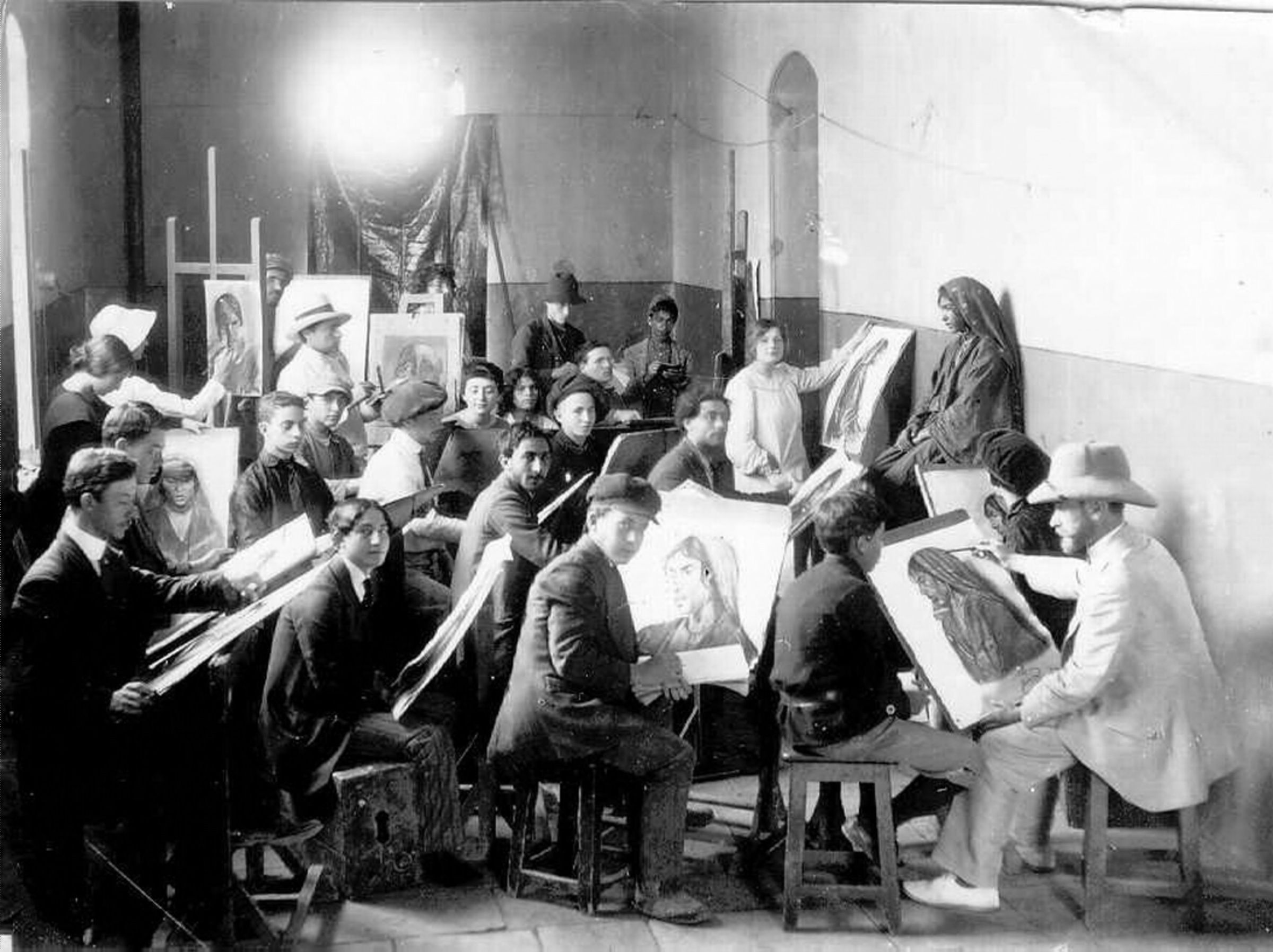
Bezalel drawing class under direction of Abel Pann, 1912

=== Establishment ===
In 1903 Boris Schatz proposed establishing an art school directly to Theodor Herzl, founding father of political Zionism. Schatz envisaged the creation of a Zionist style of art blending classical Jewish/Middle Eastern and European traditions. In 1905, the seventh Zionist Congress passed a resolution supporting the establishment of a Zionist school of art in Palestine. The Bezalel School of Arts and Crafts was officially founded the next year in 1906, with assistance from E.M. Lilien. The school opened in rented premises on Ethiopia Street in Jerusalem. It moved to a complex of buildings constructed in the 1880s surrounded by a crenelated stone wall, owned by a wealthy Arab person. In 1907, the property was purchased for Boris Schatz by the Jewish National Fund. Schatz lived on the campus with his wife and children. Bezalel's first class consisted of 30 young art students from Europe who successfully passed the entrance exam. Eliezer Ben Yehuda was hired to teach Hebrew to the students, who hailed from various countries and had no common language. His wife, Hemda Ben-Yehuda, worked as Boris Schatz's secretary.

An important benefactor for the establishment and development of the School was Jacob Moser a wool merchant of Bradford in England (originally from Schleswig in Denmark). In 1907 he gave 10,000 Marks, to be paid in annual instalments of 1,000 Marks, to the School.

In addition to traditional sculpture and painting, the school offered workshops that produced decorative art objects in silver, leather, wood, brass, and fabric. Many of the craftsmen were Yemenite Jewish silversmiths who had a long tradition of working in precious metals, as metal smithing was a traditional Jewish occupation in Yemen. Yemenite immigrants were also frequent subjects of Bezalel artists.

Many students went on to become well-known artists, among them Meir Gur Aryeh, Ze'ev Raban, Shmuel Ben David, Ya'ackov Ben-Dov, Zeev Ben-Zvi, Jacob Eisenberg, Jacob Pins, Jacob Steinhardt and Hermann Struck.

In 1912, Bezalel had one female student, Marousia (Miriam) Nissenholtz, who used the pseudonym Chad Gadya.

=== Demise and rebirth ===
With the arrival of Yitzhak Frenkel to the region in 1925 and the opening of his art studio in Tel Aviv, began the demise of the Jerusalem based Bezalel's artistic relevance. Borish Schatz was famously critical of modern art and the Bezalel school was considered as conservative relative to European trends at the time. Multiple Bezalel students flocked to Frenkel's art studio where they absorbed modern techniques and were made aware of modern trends, specifically of the School of Paris to which belonged Frenkel. Amongst Bezalel students who went to study in Frenkel's studio are Moshe Castel, Yehezkel Streichman, Avigdor Stematsky and others.

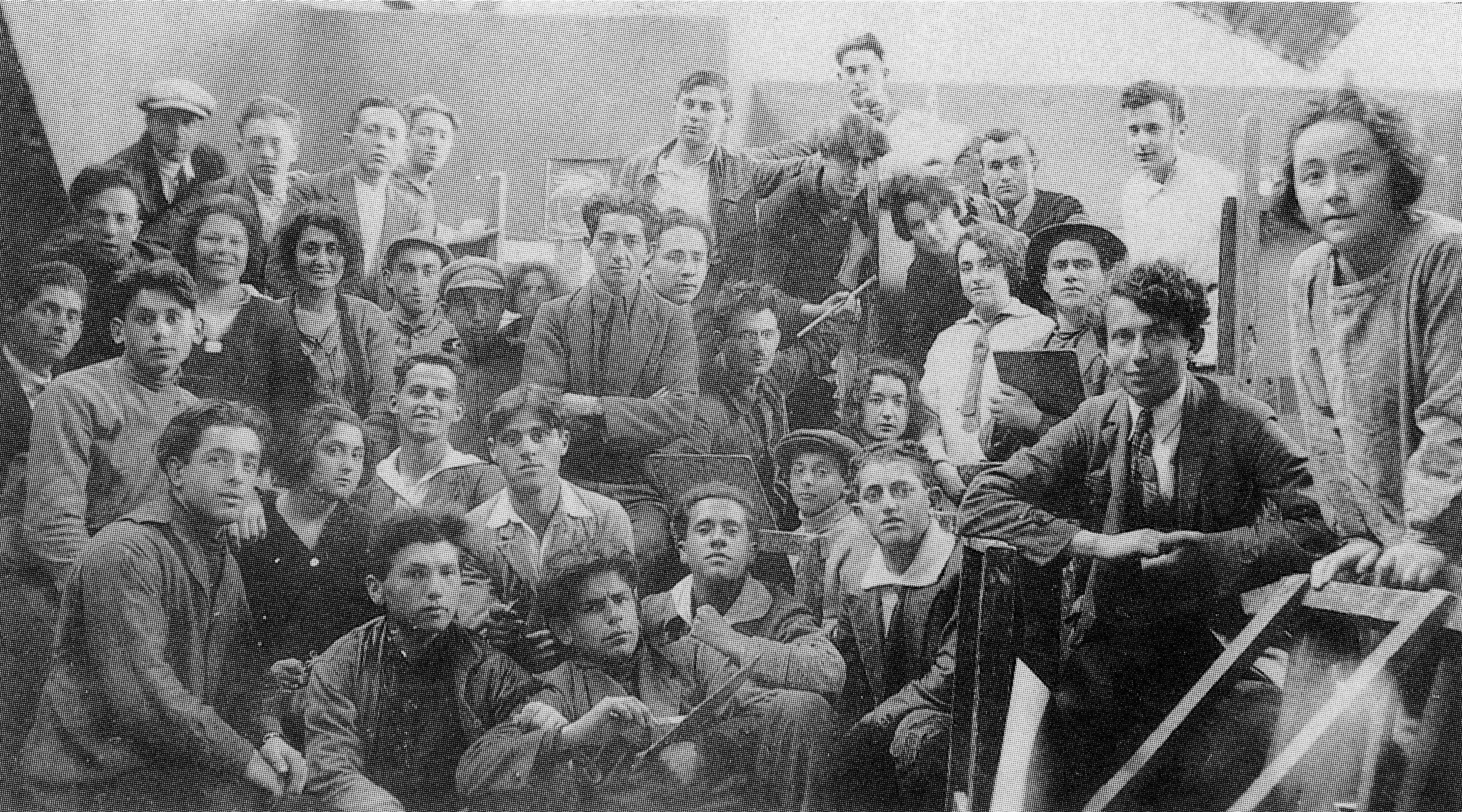
Students of Bezalel in 1926

Bezalel closed in 1929 in the wake of financial difficulties. After Hitler's rise to power, Bezalel's board of directors asked Josef Budko, who had fled Germany in 1933, to reopen it and serve as its director. Boris Schatz died in 1932 while touring Bezalel artwork in the United States. This led to the New Bezalel School of Arts and Crafts opened in 1935 and Budko, to recruit Jakob Steinhardt and Mordecai Ardon to teach at the school. Both succeeded him as directors of Bezalel attracting many teachers and students from Germany, many of them from the Bauhaus school shut down by the Nazis.

In 1947, according to Bezalel, the number of students increased and in 1952 it gained state funding. In 1958, the first year that the prize was awarded to an organization, Bezalel won the Israel Prize for painting and sculpture.

In 1969, Bezalel became a state-supported institution. In 1975 it was recognized by the Council for Higher Education in Israel as an institute of higher education. It relocated to Mount Scopus in 1990.

In 2013, several programs were relocated to the Hansen House complex in Jerusalem, including the Master's Program in Industrial Design (previously based on the Mount Scopus campus), the Department of Continuing Education, and later, the Master's Programs in Urban Design, Policy and Theory of the Arts, and Visual Communication.

In 2009 Bezalel announced plans to relocate to a new campus adjacent to the Russian Compound, as part of a municipal plan to revive Jerusalem's downtown. The new campus—officially named the Jack, Joseph and Morton Mandel campus—opened in 2023. It was designed by Tokyo-based award-winning architectural firm SANAA in collaboration with Israeli firms Nir Kutz Architects and HQ Architects.

== Bezalel pavilion ==
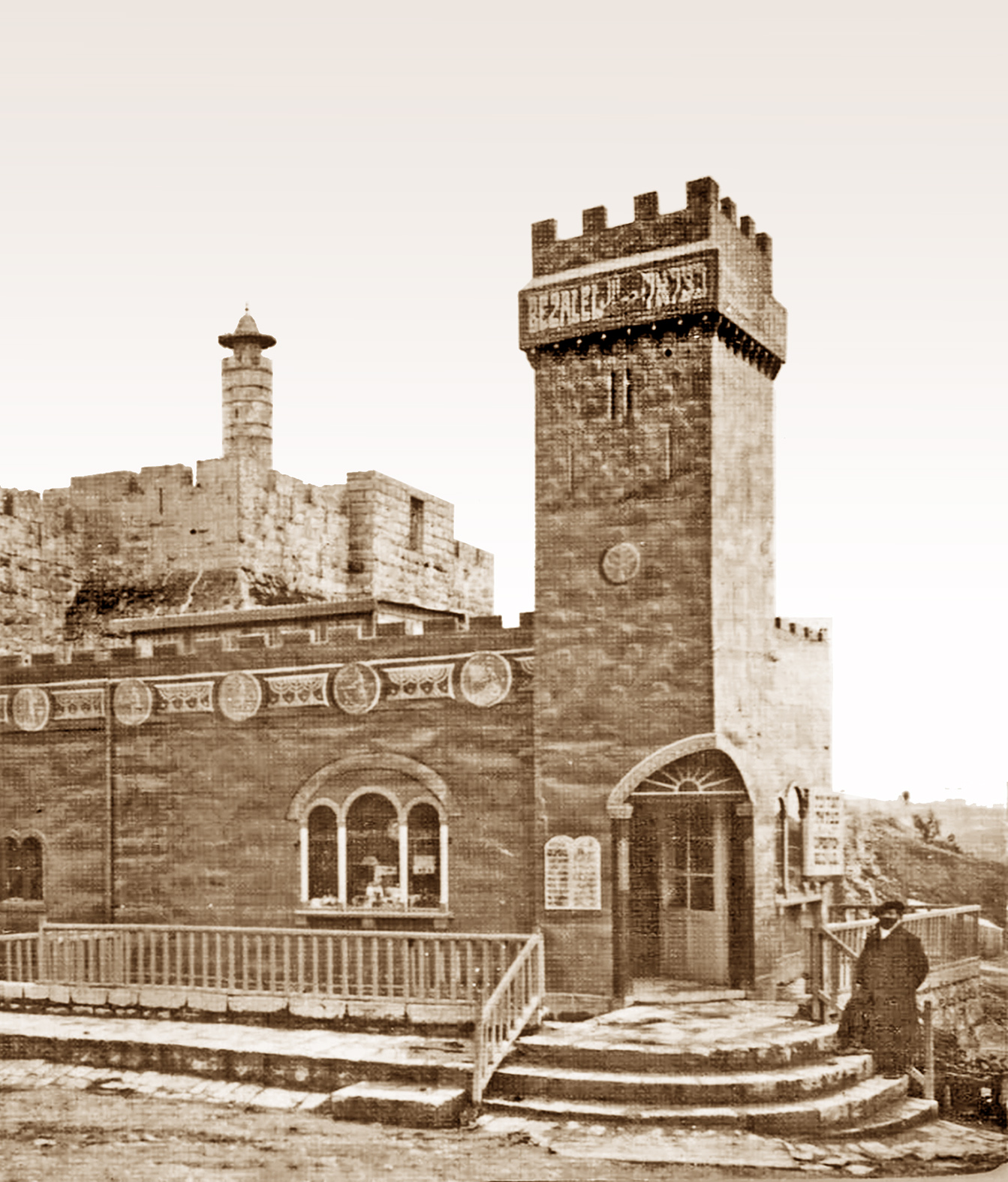
Bezalel Pavilion near Jaffa Gate

Bezalel pavilion was a tin-plated wooden structure with a crenelated roof and tower built outside Jaffa Gate in 1912. It was a shop and showroom for Bezalel souvenirs. The pavilion was demolished by the British authorities six years later.

== Bezalel style ==
Bezalel developed a distinctive style of art, known as the Bezalel school, which portrayed Biblical and Zionist subjects in a style influenced by the European jugendstil (Art Nouveau) and traditional Persian and Syrian art. The artists blended "varied strands of surroundings, tradition and innovation," in paintings and craft objects that invokes "biblical themes, Islamic design and European traditions," in their effort to "carve out a distinctive style of Jewish art" for the new nation they intended to build in the ancient Jewish homeland.

=== Ceramic tiles ===
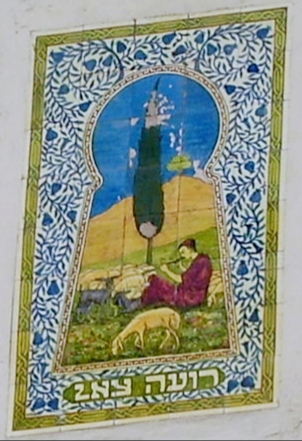
Bezalel tile scene, Lederberg House

Decorative ceramic tiles with figurative motives with both biblical and Zionist scenes were created in the 1920s at the Bezalel School, with some surviving until today. In Tel Aviv some of the best-known examples are the following:

- Lederberg House (1925) at the corner of Allenby Street and Rothschild Boulevard, ceramic tiles designed by Ze'ev Raban
- Moshav Zkenim Synagogue (also spelled Zekenim), 89 Allenby Street
- Municipal School, 37 Ahad Ha'Am Street (built 1924)
- Bialik House, or Beit Bialik

There are Bezalel-made ceramic street signs surviving in Jerusalem.

== Today ==
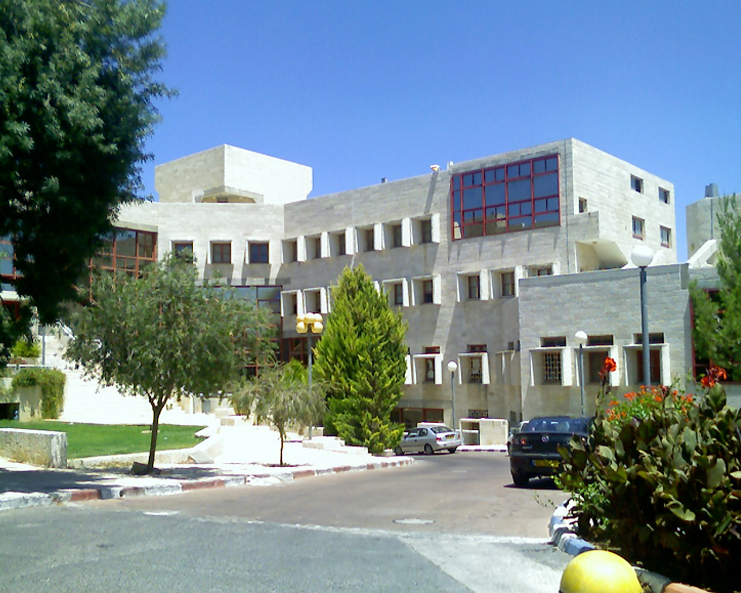
Old Bezalel campus on Mount Scopus in Jerusalem

In 2006, the Bezalel Academy of Art and Design celebrated its 100th anniversary. Faculties include Fine Arts, Architecture, Ceramic Design, Industrial Design, Jewelry, Photography, Visual Communication, Animation, Film, and Art History & Theory. Bezalel offers Bachelor of Fine Arts (B.F.A.), Bachelor of Architecture (B.Arch.), Bachelor of Design (B.Des.) degrees, a Master of Fine Arts in conjunction with Hebrew University, two different Master of Design (M.des) degrees and Theory and Policy of art (M.A.)

In 2011, the Bezalel student show at the Milan Furniture Fair was described as a "lively runner-up" for the best exhibit.

== Notable faculty ==
- Yuval Baer (born 1958), architect
- Samuel Hirszenberg (1865–1908), painter
- Yaacov Kaufman (born 1945), industrial designer
- Aaron Marcus, (born 1943), graphic designer and computer artist, Visiting Faculty, 1977–78
- Abraham Neumann (1873–1942), painter
- Abel Pann (1883–1963), painter
- Ze'ev Raban (1890–1970), painter, decorative artist, and industrial designer
- Siona Shimshi (born 1939), painter, sculptor, ceramist, and textile designer
- Sari Srulovitch (born 1964), artist and silversmith
- Joshua Neustein (born 1940), contemporary visual artist

== Notable alumni ==
- Noor Abuarafeh (born 1986), Palestinian visual artist
- Baruch Agadati (1895–1976), Russian-Palestinian-Israeli classical ballet dancer, choreographer, painter, film producer and director
- Yaacov Agam (1928-2026), sculptor and experimental artist
- Gideon Amichay (born 1963), communication artist, cartoonist, writer
- Ron Arad (born 1951), industrial designer
- Avigdor Arikha (1929–2010), painter
- Netiva Ben-Yehuda (1928–2011), author, editor, Palmach commander
- Moti Bodek (born 1961), architect, lecturer
- Elinor Carucci (born 1971), photographer
- Eran Chen (born 1970), architect
- Yitzhak Danziger (1916–1977), sculptor
- Hanna Eshel (1926–2023), sculptor
- Uri Gershuni (born 1970), photographer
- Yoni Goodman (born 1976), animator and illustrator
- Nachum Gutman (1898–1980), painter, sculptor, author
- Na'ama Haneman, silversmith
- Vania Heymann (born 1986), film director
- Nir Hod (born 1970), artist
- Anat Hoffman (born 1954), executive director of Israel Religious Action Center and director and founding member of Women of the Wall
- Itshak Holtz (born 1925), painter
- Gurwin Kopel (1923–1990), artist
- Brothers of Light (born 1988 and 1991), street artists
- Yaron London (born 1940), media personality, journalist, actor, songwriter
- Slimane Mansour (1947-2026), Palestinian artist
- Joshua Meyer (born 1974), painter
- Rutu Modan (born 1966), illustrator, comic book artist
- Roy Nachum (born 1979), contemporary artist
- Itay Noy, watchmaker
- Ran Poliakine (born 1967), serial entrepreneur
- Zvi Raphaeli (1924–2005), painter and Rabbi
- Ophrah Shemesh (born 1952), painter
- Avigdor Stematsky (1908–1989), painter
- Yehezkel Streichman (1906–1993), painter
- Lidia Zavadsky (born 1937), sculptor

== See also ==
- Jewish ceremonial art
- List of Israeli visual artists
- List of universities and colleges in Israel
