= Israeli printmaking =

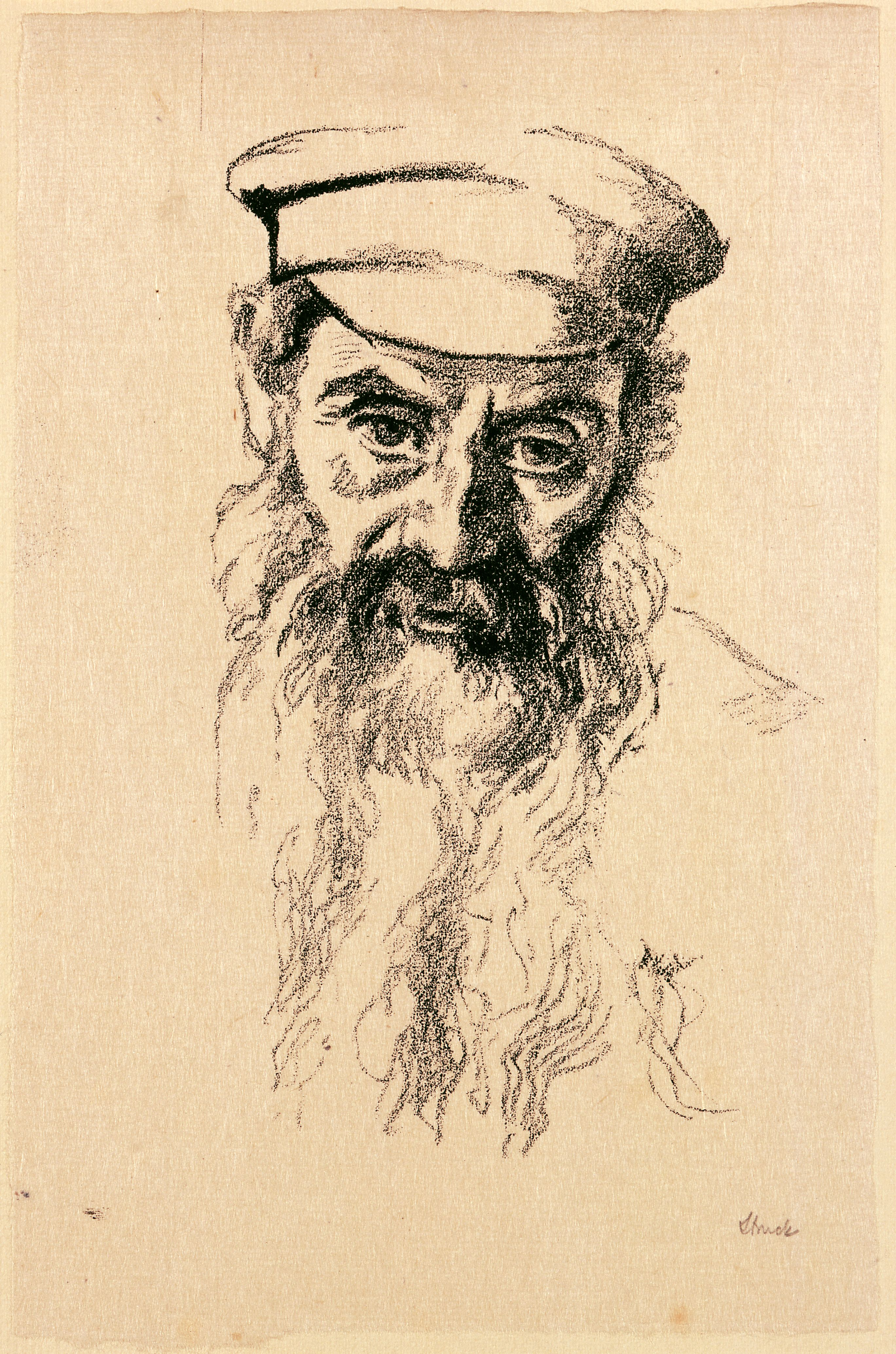
Print by Hermann Struck

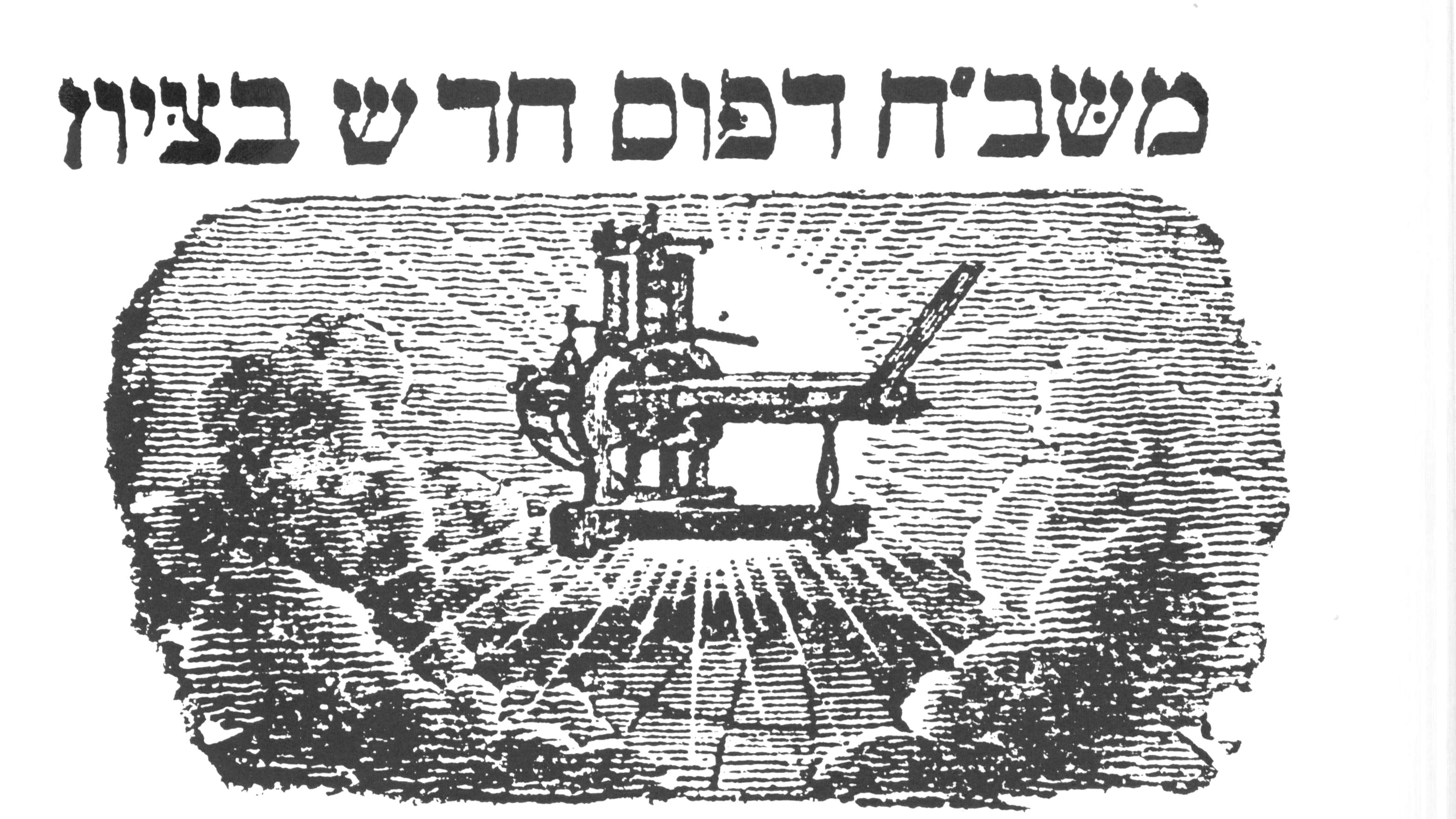
Print of the printing press of the Salomon printing press

Israeli printmaking refers to printmaking by Jewish artists in the Land of Israel and the State of Israel beginning in the second half of the 19th century. The genre includes a variety of techniques, including woodcutting, etching and lithography.

== History ==
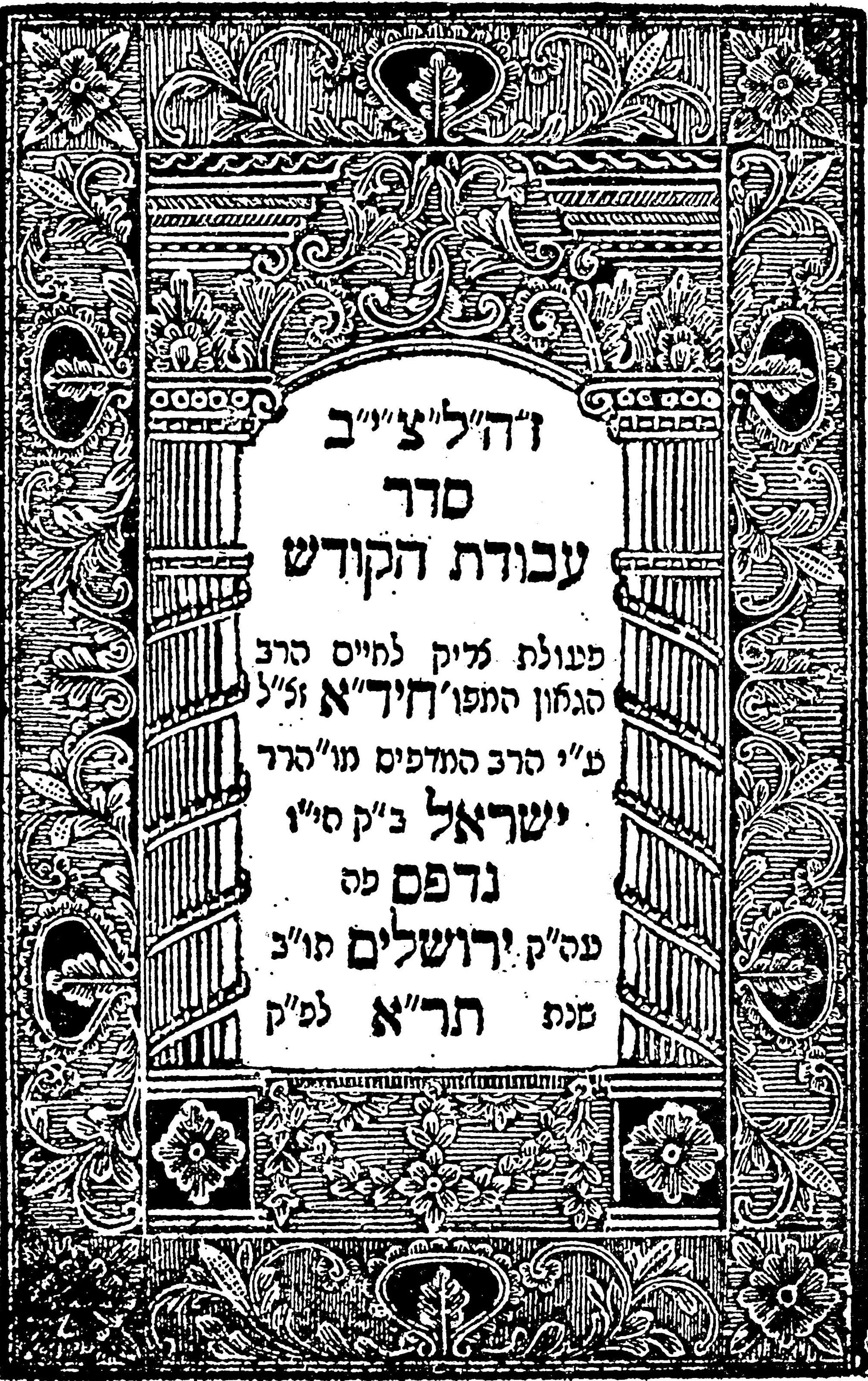
Seder Avodat Hakodesh title page, woodcut, printed by Yisrael Beck

The first printing press in the Land of Israel, and all of Western Asia, was established in Safed in 1577 by partners Eliezer and Abraham ben Isaac Ashkenazi (apparently no relation). The first book printed was Lekach Tov, a commentary on the Book of Esther by 18 year old Yom Tov Tzahalon. Eliezer, a native of Prague, operated in Lublin and Constantinople before settling in Safed, and the press apparently shut down following his death in 1587.

The modern printing industry in Israel goes back to the second half of the 19th century, when a number of printing houses were established in Jerusalem. These printing houses dealt with the printing of texts in which various artistic images were incorporated. The first Hebrew printing house was established by Yisrael Bak (abbreviation of Baal Koreh) in Safed in 1841 and transferred to Jerusalem in 1841. Bak worked with presses and tools for casting letters he brought with him from Europe. The first press was a wooden table-shaped press, a heavy metal plate laid on the paper undergoing the printing operation. In 1842, Bak received the printing presses nicknamed "Massat Moshe and Yehudit" (he: משאת משה ויהודית) from Moses Montefiore. Its area of print was 85 cm long and 57 cm wide. The first book printed by Beck in Jerusalem was "Seder Avodat Hakodesh" (he: סדר עבודת הקודש) by Chaim Yosef David Azulai.The title page is decorated with a hybrid wood engraving technique. In the center is an image of a two-column gate in the Ionic order, bearing a decorative frieze with an acanthus leaf. The page is framed with an ornamental flower patterns.

Christian printing houses such as the Armenian St. James Printing House were founded in 1833; the Franciscan printing house in 1846 under the direction of Sebastian Pratschner; the printing house of the Greek Orthodox Patriarchate in 1853 and a printing house in 1885 at the Schneller Orphanage.

Most of these printing houses produced texts in Letterpress printing. However, various illustrations were sometimes included. These illustrations were created using woodcut, wood engraving or metal engraving techniques and were limited by the size the print. Most of the decorations were assigned to the title page of the book. This page usually consisted of a decorative frame created from a print or image of the Holy Land. In addition, the printing houses produced decorated certificates, "Mizrach" plaques [ornamental or sacred pictures hung on the east wall of a house or synagogue in the direction of Jerusalem], etc. Some of the printing blocks were made by the printing house itself and others were commissioned. Abraham Leib Monsohn of the Monsohn Family of Jerusalem, for example, created some of the printing blocks for his printing house, while others were created by artists like Meir Rozin. The "Shiviti" by Shimon Israel Shane was printed using three blocks depicting the Western Wall, Rachel's Tomb and the Tombs of the Kings with the addition of hand-painted and hand-stamped seals. In many cases, these illustrations were reused for different purposes and even shared by different printing houses.

The first use of the technique of lithograph printing was at the Salomon Printing House (he: דפוס סלומון), founded by Yoel Moshe Salomon and Michal HaCohen, who learned the technique in Königsberg. During their studies there HaCohen and Solomon printed a pamphlet entitled "Altar Stones," in which they detailed the process of creating a lithographic print. Their decision to import the technique to Israel probably stemmed from their desire to serve as an alternative to the printing house of Back, which for 20 years had held a monopoly in the field of Jewish printmaking. One of the first works printed by the new printing house was "Shoshanta" (1862), the name for a local version of a decorative ornament drawn from European traditions. Along with the descriptions, there were also photographs of places such as the Tomb of Absalom, Tower of David, the Western Wall, etc.

Another printing press that was known for its artistic works was A.L. Monsohn Lithography (he: דפוס א.ל. מונזון), which began operations in 1892. The printing house began operating with a hand press and in 1894 brought an automatic machine from Europe that could produce about 1,000 pages per hour.[10] A major part of the work of this printing press was the use of the lithograph printing technique. Among other things, it created prints of up to half a sheet (50x70 cm), from the works of artists such as Rozin, Moshe Ben Yitzhak Mizrachi, and others, who also began to make use of photographs created using the lithographic technique, The photographs were converted to lithographs in a process that included the use of the technique of etching and transfer paper (Decalcomania).

== 1900–1950 ==
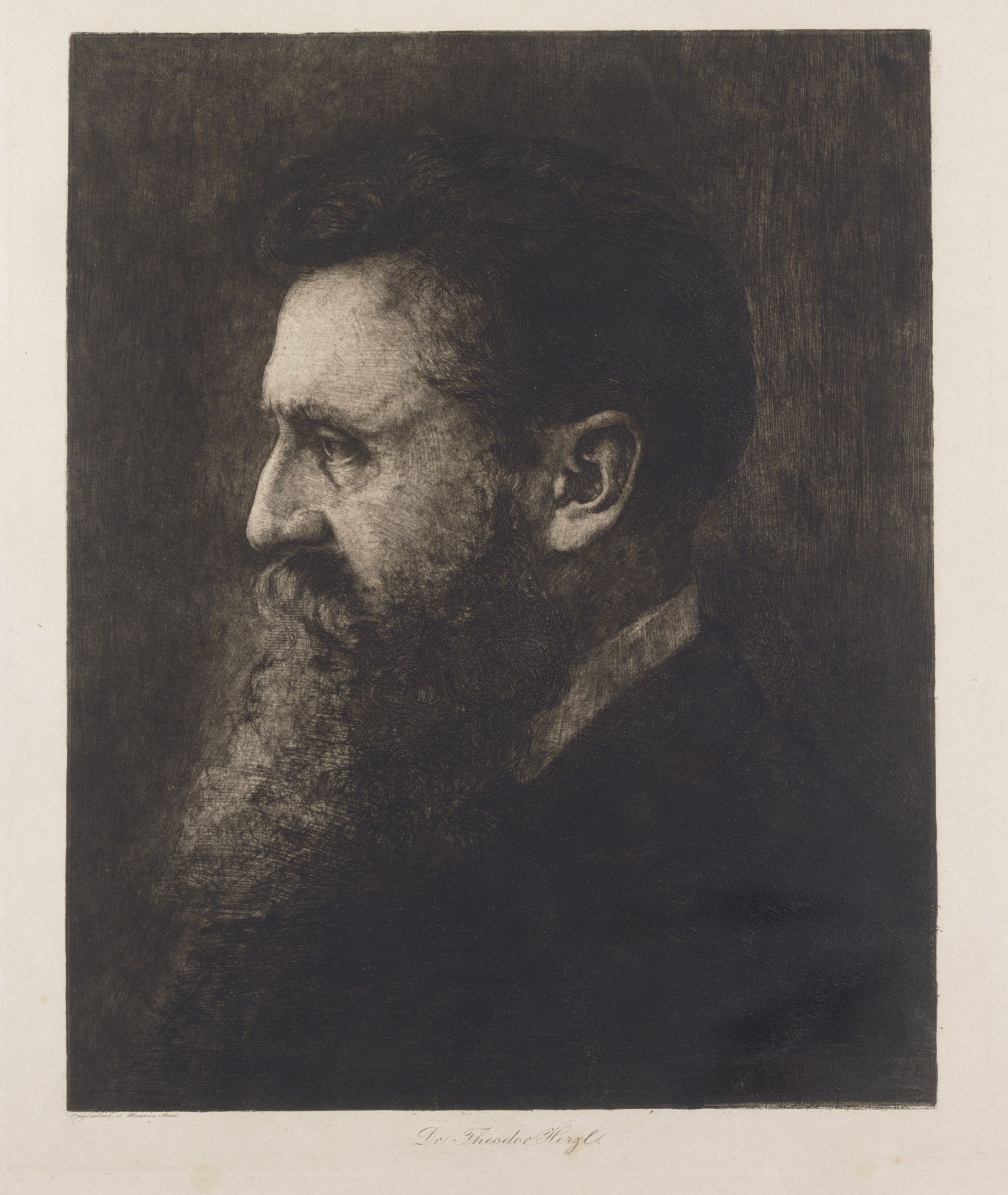
Portrait of Theodor Herzel (1903) by Hermann Struck. Etching and soft-ground

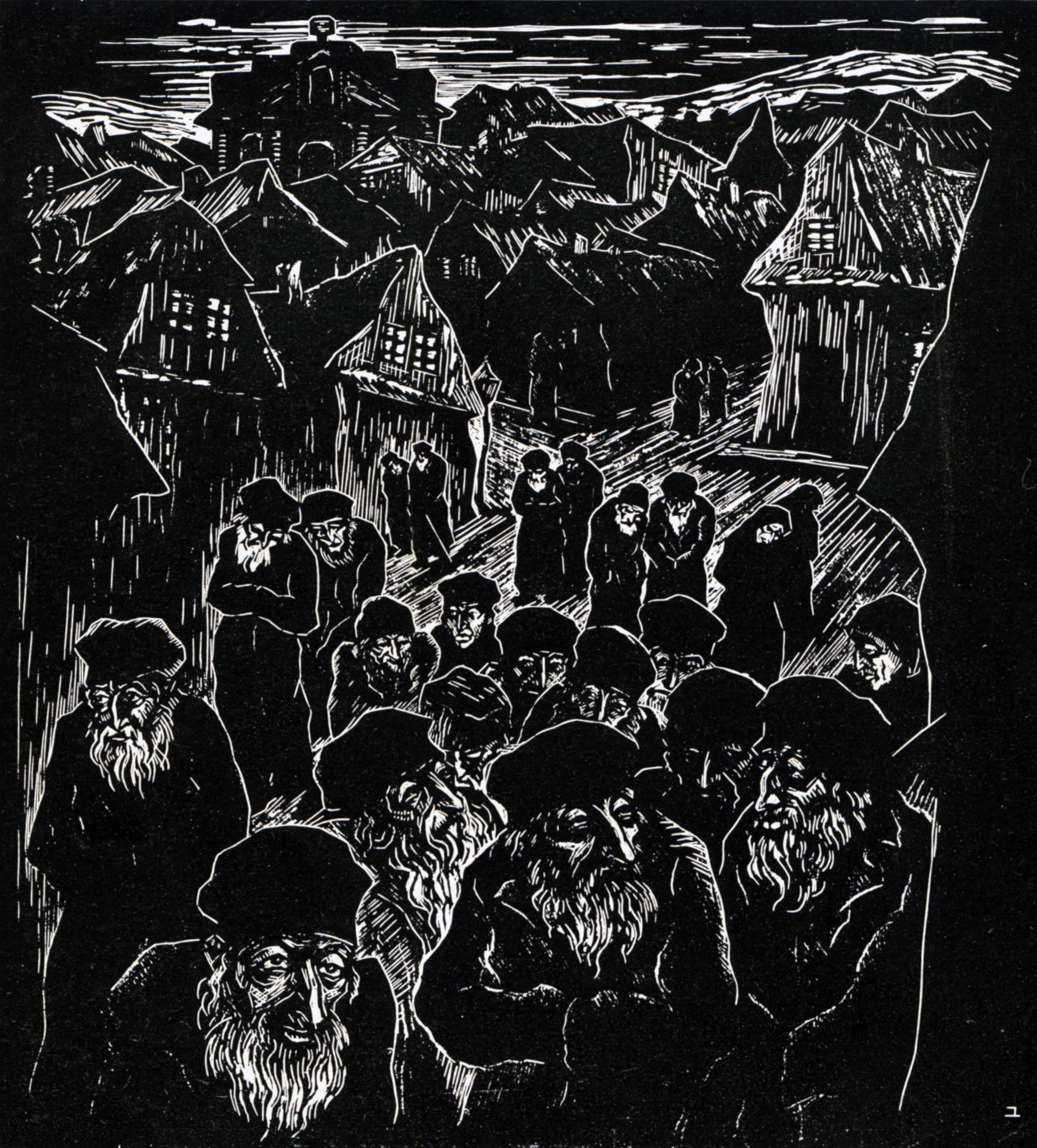
To the Synagogue (1921) by Josef Budko. Woodcut

While the people of the 'Old Yishuv' perceived art as a religious art that served the liturgy, at the beginning of the 20th century, art became more prevalent in modern Hebrew culture. Expressions of Judaism also began to gain national significance, following the expansion of the Zionist movement in Europe. The artists who came from Germany in the 1920s and 1930s, already experienced artists with a standing in the print industry, contributed most to the development of this medium in the Eretz Israel. Another central milestone in the development of this concept is the establishment of the Bezalel Academy of Arts and Crafts in Jerusalem in 1906.

=== Hermann Struck and successors ===
The most prominent Jewish artist in the European printing industry was Hermann Struck, who was associated with many Expressionist artists, was even a member of the Sezessionstil in Berlin, and exhibited consistently until 1913. Along with landscapes, Struck created portraits and genre descriptions of Jewish life, particularly in Eastern Europe. He did this in a variety of print techniques such as lithograph and etching. Over the years he published several files of prints as a book, but Struck's most famous and successful book was Die Kunst des Radierens (The Art of Etching), published in Berlin in 1908 by Paul Kasirer. The book described the process of printing etchings, interspersed with illustrations by Struck. Because of the popularity of the book, which appealed to both artists and to the public as a whole, it was printed in four additional editions between 1912 and 1923. The book established Struck's fame as a leading artist in the print industry.

Jacob Steinhardt and Joseph Budko, who studied print with Struck, also dealt often with themes from the Shtetl, not only as an ethnographic depiction, as Struck did, but also as a spiritual expression. Part of the change stemmed from the influence of expressionism on these artists. For Steinhardt, for example, this effect was expressed in a theatrical atmosphere rich in pathos and grotesque expressions.

Between 1907 and 1935, Steinhardt created about 250 etchings, but in Palestine he began to work in the wood cut, combining wood engraving parts, both because of his inability to produce these etchings and as an expression of the influence of the light in Palestine, which he expresses in the contrasting blacks and whites characteristic of this medium.

Along with their independent works, the two also created Illustrations in various print techniques for various Hebrew publications that were published in Europe at the time. Among these are the woodcuts that Steinhardt created for the Book of Jonah (1924) and the Passover Haggadah (Berlin: Ferdinand Auster, 1923), accompanied by a calligraphic text created by Franzisca Baruch, and the lithographs created by Budko for Shmuel Yosef Agnon’s And the Crooked Shall Be Made Straight (1919), as well as his prints for the 50th edition (Berlin: Hovevei Ha-Shir Ha-Ivrit, 1923) of the writings of Hayim Nahman Bialik.

=== 1906–1930: Bezalel ===
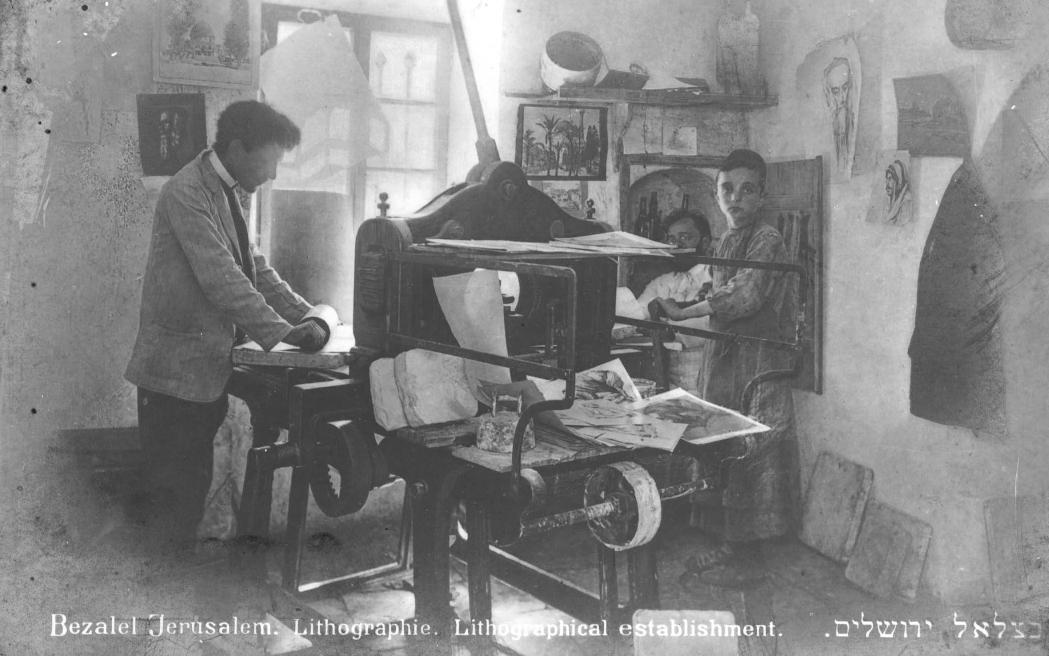
Bezalel Jerusalem, Lithographical Establishment, Photograph by Ya'acov Ben-Dov. Jerusalem Print Workshop collection

With the establishment of the Bezalel Academy of Arts and Crafts, Ephraim Moses Lilien, one of the leading illustrators in Europe, arrived in Jerusalem. His artistic style derived from the European "Jugendstil" and his work expressed the main Zionist national outlook at the time. Lilien was also in the habit of taking photographs from which he would create his drawings and prints. Despite the fact that he lived only a short time in Jerusalem, his style influenced Bezalel's main style of design.

In 1909, a lithography department was opened at Bezalel, headed by Avraham Gershowitz (Gershuni). This department printed a limited number of artistic works, mainly by artists such as Shmuel Ben-David and Ya’akov (Jacob) Stark. However, the print quality was poor and was not suitable for producing large editions, mainly due to the technical equipment. Boris Schatz himself testified in 1917 that the school had equipment to "make experimental leaves," but that "we do not have a printing machine." In addition to the artistic endeavors, the department also did commercial work such as printing textbooks and other materials, such as lottery cards designed by Shmuel Haruvi. Most of the lithographic work at Bezalel included realistic prints of portraits and genre descriptions, as well as a few commercial works.

In 1919 Yisrael Hirschfeld, a student of Bezalel in 1915–1917, was sent to Vienna to learn the art of lithograph printing. Throughout his stay there, he exchanged letters with Bezalel teachers like Abel Penn, Schatz, and others who asked him to purchase a press and lithographic equipment for Bezalel, despite the fact that they did not send money to him. In 1921 Penn himself went to Vienna and purchased a press and accompanying equipment. On this press, Penn printed the series of illustrations for the Bible he created. There is however some disagreement with regard to the printing technique of these works. While Penn declared he used lithographic printing, others declared that it was a type of offset, claiming that Jerusalem presses were unsuitable for use as a basis for lithographic printing.

Alongside Bezalel, in 1923 Ze'ev Raban and Meir Gur Arie established the Industrial Art Studio (he: בית עבודה לעבודות אינדוסטריאליות) and Graphica Press which printed posters of a limited size and various prints in the Jugendstil style. Another artist who worked in the field independently was Jacob Eisenberg, who printed etchings in a workshop in his home in Jerusalem.

During the 1920s, the influence of modernist art was evident among some Bezalel students who continued their studies in Europe or were exposed to contemporary art. These were works that established an artistic opposition to the school that expressed the spirit of the period of the Tower of David. Artists such as Nachum Gutman, Israel Paldi and others created expressive etchings and, particularly, woodcuts. Among these works is a series of prints called "The God Seekers" (1923; he: מבקשי אלוהים), created by Reuven Rubin, and the series of prints "Jaffa" (1925) by Israel Paldi. Late recognition was given to the series "Gray Tura" (1924; he: טורא אפורה) created by Arieh Allweil in Europe, which was displayed in Israel only in the 1990s.

== 1930–1950 ==
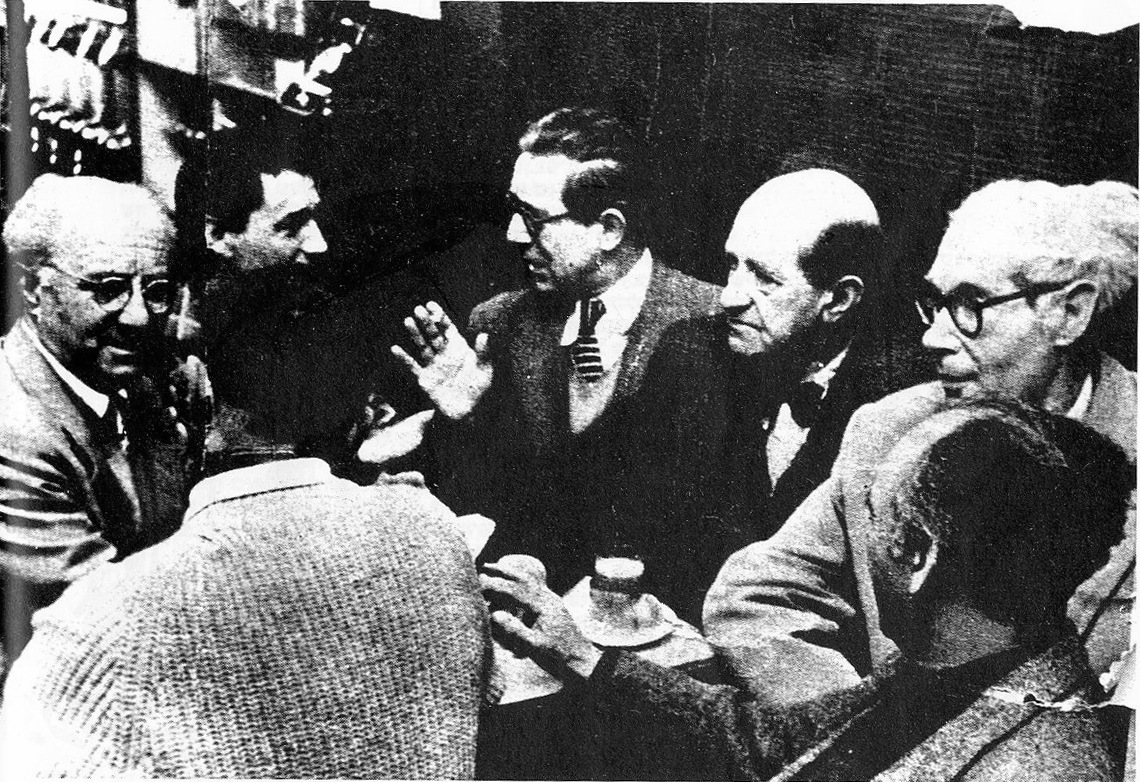
Miron Sima, Yehuda Wolpert, Isidore Aschheim, Jacob Pines, Yossi Stern and Mordecai Ardon at Cafe Ta'mon, Jerusalem, 1940s

In the 1930s, the printing industry began to take on greater importance in the field of Eretz Israeli art. The development of the field was closely linked to the Fifth Aliyah, in which many artists came to Eretz Israel and Jerusalem. These artists, persecuted by their countries of origin in Germany and Austria, sought to continue the spirit of European modernism in general and the heritage of German art movements such as Bauhaus and Expressionism in particular.

In addition, the art of the time reflected in many ways the construction of Zionist national consciousness. An example of this can be found in stamps issued by the Jewish National Fund, quoting images drawn from artists such as Struck, Lilien, Budko, Steinhardt, and others, who reflected the worldview of the creators of the artistic print, and whose images could at that time easily pass from private to nationalistic art.

The opening of the Tel Aviv Museum, in 1934, was accompanied by the dedication of one of the two halls of Tel Aviv Museum to works in the various print fields. Other examples of the growing importance of the field can be found in an article published on 20 October 1935, in Haaretz, entitled "The Question of Hebrew Graphics" and the printing of a Dictionary of Graphic Arts published by Mordecai Narkis in 1937 by the Bialik Institute and the Hebrew Language Committee. The publication of the dictionary reflected the activities of The Bezalel National Museum in the 1920s and 1930s and the need to create uniform and clear terms for the various print terms. The dictionary of Narkis, dedicated to Hermann Struck on the occasion of his 60th birthday, was based on the German language, whose terms are "most common among the graphic artists living in Israel."

A review of these documents reveals that the term "graphics" included both the artistic print and the graphic design field. This mixture would remain a guiding principle in the school of "New Bezalel School for Arts and Crafts" which was opened in 1935 in Jerusalem. The curriculum of the school aspired to raise the artistic level of design in Israel, while providing practical opportunities for students to earn a living. This practical approach demonstrated the fact that Hebrew industry (and, to some extent, the Hebrew city) also began to serve as another legitimate expression of Zionist activity. Therefore, the school, whose first director was Budko, did not open an art track, but rather a track for practical graphics, which was headed by Rudi Deutsch (Dayan). The department dealt mainly with lithograph printing, which was the most popular commercial technique at the time.

Jacob Steinhardt, who immigrated to Eretz Israel in 1933 opened, in what had been the home of Boris Schatz, a painting and printing studio that was a kind of opposition to the "New Bezalel", which was directed by Yosef Budko. After Budko's death in 1940, Steinhardt joined Bezalel's staff and became director of the school's graphics department. During this period, the importance of classical printing techniques, lithography, woodcutting, and engraving as a commercial printing technique became less important, eclipsed by offset printing. However, these techniques were revived through art classes at the school.

During the 1940s a small community of artists, who engaged in graphic techniques, including artistic prints of various kinds, was established around the "New Bezalel." A comprehensive view of their works shows the strong influence of German culture on everything connected to the cultural tradition (Bildung). In the prints of these artists, such as Miron Sima, Isidor Aschheim, and Jakob Eisenscher, as well as in the works of artists who worked independently of this group, such as Arieh Allweil, Paul Conrad Henich, Abraham Goldberg, Leo Roth and others, we see an attempt to combine European style with characteristics of the local Eretz Israeli reality and Zionist motifs and themes. This was often accompanied by the adoption of biographical-psychological features, which were largely missing in the works of historic Bezalel's artists.

== 1950–1970 ==
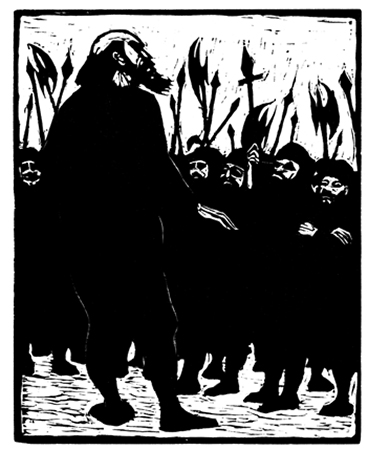
From Woodcuts for Heinrich von Kleist's Michael Kohlhaas (1953/2003) by Jacob Pins. Woodcut, Printed by the Jerusalem Print Workshop

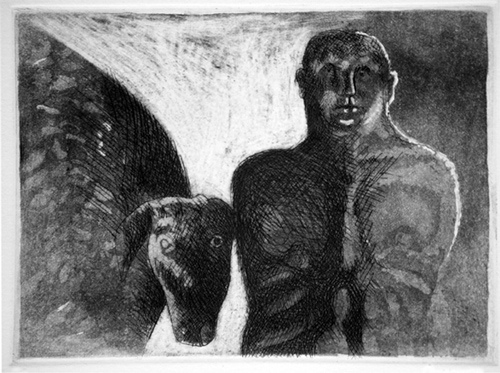
Man and Bull (1964) by Avraham Ofek. Etching and aquatint. Printed by the Jerusalem Print Workshop

The establishment of the State of Israel in 1948 does not constitute a significant historical point in the history of Israeli art, apart from several expressions of nationalism and the development of iconography around the 1948 Arab–Israeli War. However, the opening of Mandatory Palestine to Jewish immigration led to a large population that began to be educated according to the tradition of the young field of the Israeli print, led in these years by Jacob Steinhardt in the new Bezalel. Many of the youngsters who came to Eretz Israel after the Holocaust either under the auspices of Youth Aliyah, or with their families, such as Jacob Pins, Avraham Ofek, Avigdor Arikha, Yehuda Bacon, Moshe Hoffman, among others, became prominent Israeli artists in the 1950s and 1960s.

Apart from the technique of the woodcut, that could be studied at Bezalel, there were not many places that trained artists in the various print techniques. In Ein Hod and Jerusalem, Rudi Lehman taught the art of the wood cut and sculpture. A large group of artists were influenced by his approach to art, that combined animal images in a "primitive" style with a modernist ethos of creativity. This group included artists such as Shoshana Heimann, Raya Bar Adon and others. Some training in the technique of lithograph printing was provided by Cohen, who operated the Hebrew University Press in Jerusalem. Most of the artists printed their works in his studio, or with local artists, such as David Ben Shaul, who had specialized in lithograph printing in Paris. Upon his return to Israel in 1963, he brought a lithographic press and printed works for various artists in his studio in Jerusalem.

Basing themselves on the local tradition and ethos of Paris as the capital of world art, many artists continued to travel to pursue art studies in France and Europe, unaware of the change in the world art scene and the development of the United States as an art center. Aryeh Rothman, for example, went to study at the Académie Julian in 1959, and later studied in Paris at the Johnny Friedlaender engraving workshop. Tuvia Beeri studied at the Académie des Beaux-Arts (1963–1961), and continued his specialization in Friedlaender's engraving workshop. Milka Cizik, however, went to study in East Germany (1965–1961), where she studied various printing techniques at the Academy of Fine Arts, Munich.

The French and German influences led to the adoption of modernist techniques, such as Aryeh Rothman's use of the photographic technique of Heliograveur and the "invention" by others of various artistic techniques (in the spirit of late Surrealism). Miron Sima, for example, added to his woodcuts, such as "The Bride", textures printed from fabrics and chains, which sought to enrich the texture of the print, and to deepen its realism. In addition, the shortage of materials available in Israel led many artists to use other techniques that were available to them, such as Linocut, as a substitute for wood cut. Even Rudi Lehmann, despite his strong connection to artistic tradition, experimented with the use of new materials. He was one of the first artists to create woodcuts on plywood.

The artistic print field to which these students were exposed upon their return to Israel was very limited. Not only were there no places to print editions of artistic prints, it was also considered a secondary art. In the 1960 album Graphic Art in Israel, Eugen Kolb wrote that "exhibitions of graphics only are considered (unfairly!) for less important exhibits." Elisheva Cohen, curator of the Department of Prints and Drawings at the Bezalel National Museum and at the Israel Museum, had to publish the booklet The Print: What Is It? (1965), in order to expose the field to visitors to the museum. Therefore, it is no wonder that in the annual general exhibition of the Israel Painters and Sculptors Association of 1963, for example, only 7 artistic prints were displayed out of 375 works. Also at the exhibition Tazpit 1964, which was perceived as more artistic at the time, Tuvia Beeri was the only artist among more than 30 artists who exhibited prints.

However, at the same time the print was perceived in various circles as an expression of "good taste." An example of this can be found in the publications of Moshe Spitzer, who commissioned illustrations for publications by Tarshish Publishing House that were done using various print techniques. Among these works are Avigdor Luisada's woodcuts for Yitzhak Shenhar’s Between Star and Grass (1942) and the engravings of Avigdor Arikha for A Stray Dog (1958) and the woodcuts created by Jacob Pines for the book Michael Kohlhaas (1953).

In 1965, the printing workshop of the Artists House Tel Aviv opened under the auspices of the Israel Painters and Sculptors Association and was managed by Tuvia Beeri. The workshop gave artists for the first time a place of work to create works using engraving techniques. At the same time, Beeri opened another workshop at the Avni Institute.

== 1970-1990 ==
During the 1970s and 1980s, the printing industry underwent a period of unprecedented development in Israel. A variety of print workshops made it possible for artists to create works using various techniques in this medium. A number of artists began to work in prints and in preparing printing plates for other artists in their studio. Moshe Givati established a printing workshop in Haifa that dealt mainly with screen printing technique. David (Dedi) Ben Shaul, printed using lithograph technique, and Avishai Eyal, who worked primarily in the medium of etching, set up a separate studio in Jerusalem. However, the establishment of the large workshops made the independent activities of these artists somewhat redundant. Itche Mambush founded another workshop in the 1960s in Ein Hod, directed by Ora Lahav Shaltiel. In 1972 Jacob Harel founded a commercial print workshop that would become Har-el Printers and Publishers. In 1974 the Jerusalem Print Workshop was established in Jerusalem. The workshop was established as a public benefit company and was initially associated with the Jerusalem Artists Association. In 1975, the Israel Museum set up another public print workshop - the Burston Graphics Center - in Hutzot Hayotzer. In addition, several other printing houses published in the field of artistic printing.

An example of the rising popularity of the medium could be found in the activity of the Israeli Graphotek, which in 1978 had not yet opened its doors to the public, but had already collected about 1300 works by 105 different artists. By the 1990s, Graphotek had already collected about 4,000 works by about 200 artists and was accessible to the public in six centers around the country. In a 1975 list, Adam Baruch described the growing popularity of artistic prints during those years in Israel and around the world. Baruch distinguished between the reproduction of old works to the medium of the print, and works of art that made critical use of the various techniques of the medium. In addition, attempts were made to mount systematic displays of prints. In 1978, the exhibition "30 Israeli Artists: Artistic Prints" was presented at Tel Aviv University, and during the 1980s, attempts were made to establish a triennale for graphics at the Haifa Museum of Art.

Many artists adopted the medium as another technique in their work, a technique of a more commercial nature. Usually prints were produced in editions of between 30 and 150 copies. Some of the works were intended for the international market, especially for the United States. In addition, various albums were also produced that combined 5-10 works by a single artist or by a group of artists. This commercial development led several galleries to continuously produce series of prints for artists, which were printed in the various workshops. The major ones included the Bineth Gallery in Tel Aviv and the Engel Gallery in Jerusalem. The popularity of the print also led to the printing of signed and numbered posters by artists or the production of prints based on the works of deceased artists, by inscribing their signature on the plate.

Unlike most of the artists who worked in the field, in the 1970s and 1980s, a group of artists continued their avant-garde activities concerning everything related to the examination of the artistic object, including in the medium of print. Artists such as Buky Schwartz, Michael Gitlin, Benni Efrat, and others emphasized the plastic nature of the paper by using various artistic means such as repetition and seriality, or by emphasizing the print plate as an object, or by folding and distorting the paper. Pinchas Cohen Gan, for example, made use of plates printed on entire sheets of paper in 1980, leaving him with negatives. In the works of Menashe Kadishman (1983), the artist reconstructed his sculptural activities and converted them into the print media, creating a confrontation between nature and culture. A unique preoccupation with the surface of the print is also found in the works of Joyce Schmidt, who created prints using techniques of stress. Her paper-making business led her to make use of the paper produced by the business.

From a technical point of view, the flourishing of lithography technique particularly stands out during this period. The main development of the technique in Israel during this period can be credited to the work of the Burston Graphic Center, which in its first year trained artists in this technique. Alima, who studied this technique at Burston, imported this printing technique to the print workshop at the Artists House in Tel Aviv and the College of Visual Arts in Beersheva. In her independent work she combined the technique of lithography with other techniques such as screen printing and etching. To a great extent, this technique died out in the early 1990s, with the closure of the Burston Center.

In contrast to the lithography and etching techniques, the screen printing technique (or "silkscreen printing" as it was called at the time) was perceived as a secondary technique, mainly because it lacked any artistic tradition. Art in Israel began using industrial techniques in the late 1950s, but until the 1970s it was not widely used in art. As early as 1949, Ellie Gross (Yaari) lectured on serigraphy (screen printing) in the exhibition "What is Graphics?" In the Jerusalem Artists House. However, an early example of artistic use of the medium can be found in the book The Jerusalem Hills and all the Anguish (1967) by Malachi Beit-Arie published by Tarshish. The book was accompanied by screen prints created by Myriam Bat-Yosef and printed in a commercial printing press - "Herut Herut Printing Press".

The most significant development in the use of art technique can be attributed to Zvi Tolkovsky, who returned from art studies in the United States and learned the technique there. At the end of the sixties, Tolkovsky returned to Israel and, in 1969-1969, a workshop for printing and screen printing at the Bezalel Academy of Art and Design. Tolkovsky also taught at the Artists House in Tel Aviv, where screen printing was used as part of a variety of techniques such as calligraphy. An expression of the ambivalent status of the screen print can be found in the work of Moshe Gershuni, who was commissioned to create a series of print works at the Jerusalem Print Workshop in 1984. Gershuni testified that he had a distaste for the print medium, "especially for screen printing, which in my opinion represented the most extreme form of graphic art." However, his works in this technique, including "Avinu Malkeinu" [Our Father, Our King] (1984), "Justice and Charity" (1984), and others, enjoyed both artistic and commercial success.

However, the bulk of the prints were done using various etching techniques. These works were figurative in character and expressive in language. The works of artists such as Raanan Levy, Ofer Lellouche, Tamara Rickman, David Ben-Shaul, were drawings, created using traditional techniques as etching and aquatint. In addition, there were also artists who incorporated new techniques in their works, such as Uri Lifschitz, who combined in works such as "Mr. Rabinovich" (1968), etching with photographic etching. Yigal Tumarkin, for example, in the print "Pieta, Pierre Paolo Pasolini," (1979).

combined several print plates made using the technique of photographic etching, on which he combined drawing and dry etching. The plates were combined in a collage, cut and twisted to give them an expressive character and to create negative spaces in the composition. Artists such as Ivan Schwebel, Asaph Ben Menachem and Avraham Eilat, used this expressionism as an expression of symbolism or metaphysical content. In the famous series "Kaddish" (1984), for example, Moshe Gershuni created a tangle of symbols and images that expressed a complex position toward Judaism and the Jewish God.

=== 1990-2010 ===
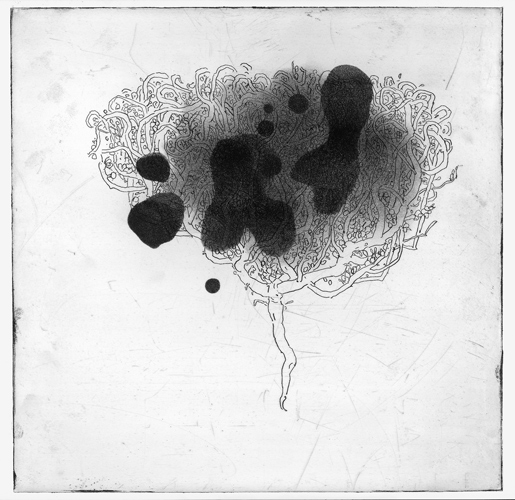
Rose of Jericho (2003) by Larry Abramson. Soft-ground and spit-bite. Printed by the Jerusalem Print Workshop

In the early 1990s, "new media art" began to develop, using visual images created by "technical reproduction" without the need to use a manual process of creating print plates and manual printing. The use of computer graphics and digital media, which developed during this period, completely replaced manual design. The use of these methods also led to the perception of the art print industry as archaic. This led to the closure and reduction of many print workshops during the 2000s. Among other things, the workshops of the Faculty of Arts - Hamidrasha at Beit Berl College were closed, and Bezalel's work was greatly reduced.

The activities of professional workshops were also reduced, and they stopped producing works in large editions and went on to print works in editions of only 12-18 copies. The Burston Center workshop was closed in 1990 after management problems, while the Printmaking Workshop of Tel Aviv Artists House converted its services from printing whole editions to making available the possibility of independent activity and instruction in the use of various techniques. Most of institutionalized artistic activity took place at the Gottesman Etching Center, which was established at Kibbutz Cabri in 1993, at the Har-El Printers & Publishers print workshop in Tel Aviv-Yafo and at the Jerusalem Print Workshop, which experienced a period of prosperity as a result of the workshop's activity, when it moved to a new business and artistic model in the mid-1980s.

The shrinking of the field led most of the major artists who worked in the print industry, such as Ofer Lellouche, Larry Abramson, Sharon Poliakine, Asaf Ben Zvi, Hila Lulu Lin and others, to perceive the medium as secondary in their work. However, artists such as Orit Hofshi, Asaph Ben-Menahem and others have made it the primary medium in their work.

An area that began to develop during this period is the production of "artists’ books" - books that combined text - mostly poems - with prints created specifically for this book. Such books replaced folders of prints that artists had previously published as a portfolio. The books were printed in limited editions and numbered in etching or screen printing techniques. As early as the 1980s, the Jerusalem Print Workshop began printing such books. Among the best known are Thirteen Etchings for Poems by Haim Nachman Bialik (1987) by Moshe Gershuni, and in 1989 the workshop created a series of 9 artists’ books in an edition of 40 copies each. Due to the high cost of producing such books, most of the works were printed for renowned artists.

Although Israeli museums continued to purchase prints, exhibitions in major galleries in Tel Aviv-Yafo or museum exhibitions of Israeli prints were unusual, and even the inclusion of prints in group thematic exhibitions was very small. In 1994, the Israel Museum mounted the exhibition, The Printer's Imprint: Twenty Years with the Jerusalem Print Workshop, Jerusalem, marking the 20th anniversary of the Jerusalem Print Workshop. Among the other museum exhibitions are Portfolios from the Gottesman Etching Center, Kibbutz Cabri (2006) at the Israel Museum, Etchings (2006) at the Negev Museum of Art and Print Time, Works from the Jerusalem Workshop and the Gottesman Center (2013) at the Open Museum, Tefen.
