= Kibbutz volunteer =

Volunteer community

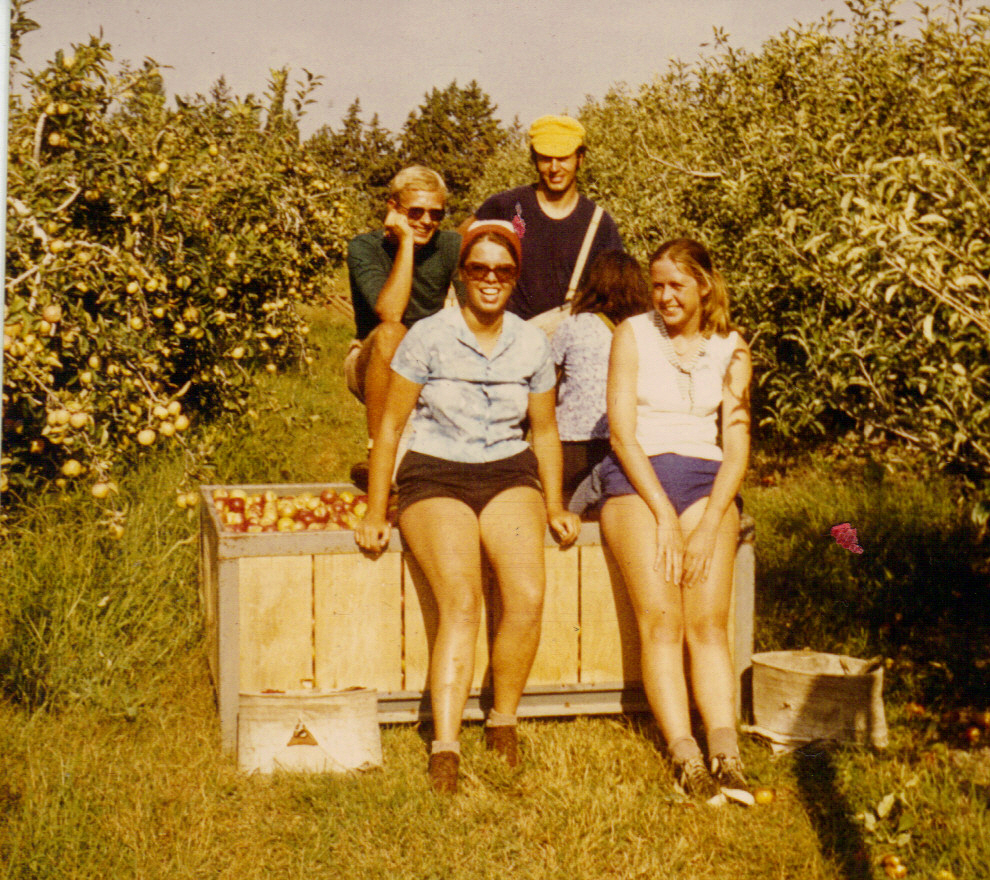
Austrian kibbutz volunteers at Kibbutz Ein HaShofet working in the apple orchard, summer of 1973

Kibbutz volunteers are people who come from all over the world to live and work in a kibbutz in Israel. These volunteers, mostly young people, usually stay at the kibbutz for a short period of time (such as a month or all summer), working in various branches of the kibbutz economy (agriculture, kitchen, gardening and factory). Most volunteers typically come to Israel for a short period of two to three months under a volunteer visa and participate. Volunteers receive food and board, and sometimes pocket money. Some volunteers combine work with studying Hebrew at a kibbutz ulpan. Some kibbutzim organize trips and cultural events for the volunteers.

== History ==
The volunteering phenomenon in the kibbutzim began in the mid-1960s when the young generation of Baby Boomers from western nations became curious about kibbutz life and eager to experience it first-hand, and as a result decided to come to Israel, volunteer in a kibbutz and gain experience of living and working in a collective community. Although up until the Six-Day War the kibbutzim had very few volunteers, after the conclusion of the Six-Day War the world's interest in Israel grew, and in the aftermath large numbers of volunteers arrived. As a result, many kibbutzim began arranging the necessary housing and infrastructure to accommodate this growing phenomenon. During this period there was also an increased interest in Israel among the Diaspora Jewish communities, from which the majority of kibbutz volunteers initially originated.

In the subsequent years kibbutz volunteering gradually increased significantly and was institutionalized. With time the proportion of Jewish kibbutz volunteers gradually decreased while the majority of the volunteers at that point were non-Jews who originated mostly from Western Europe and arrived either in organized groups or as individuals. Initially the kibbutzim were very satisfied with the phenomenon as it brought cheap labor, which minimized the need to hire workers and brought openness to the various cultures of the world. Nevertheless, over time some kibbutzim also became aware of the negative aspects of the phenomenon as it became evident that some individuals among the volunteers used drugs, consumed alcohol, and a growing rate of intermarriages with kibbutz members often involved the migration of some of those members to the country of origin of the volunteers.

During the peak of the kibbutz volunteers phenomenon in the 1970s, around 12,000 volunteers arrived each year, and worked in hundreds of kibbutzim throughout Israel.

Following an acute economic crisis that many of the kibbutzim in Israel experienced during the 1980s, many kibbutzim began adopting an action-oriented market economy and concluded that basing the economy on the volunteer workforce was not a profitable model. Meanwhile, some kibbutzim gradually began to employ foreign workers from Thailand in the agricultural sector of the kibbutz and Israeli workers in the industrial and services sectors.

Following the intensification of the Israeli–Palestinian conflict during the last decades of the 20th century, and in particular after the Second Intifada started in 2000, many countries ceased to cooperate with the project and as a result there was a significant decrease in the number of the kibbutz volunteers. The decrease hit its lowest point in 2001, when only 100 volunteers arrived in Israel. In recent years, there has been a slight increase in the number of volunteers, and in 2007 approximately 1,500 kibbutz volunteers came to Israel.

In total, 350,000 volunteers from 35 countries have volunteered in various kibbutzim in Israel since 1967, with most of the volunteers through the years coming from the United Kingdom (circa 50,000), South Africa (circa 40,000), Sweden (circa 25,000), Denmark (circa 20,000), and Germany (circa 15,000).

== Notable volunteers ==
- Michele Bachmann, American Congresswoman and 2012 U.S. Presidential candidate, spent a summer volunteering at Kibbutz Be'eri at the age of 18 in 1974.
- Sandra Bernhard, American comedian, actress, author and singer, volunteered for a year at Kibbutz Kfar Menachem at the age of 17 in 1972.
- Noam Chomsky, American professor of linguistics, peace activist, spent time at Kibbutz HaZore'a in 1953.
- Sacha Baron Cohen, British comedian best known for the roles of Ali G and Borat volunteered in Rosh HaNikra and Kibbutz Beit HaEmek for a year in the late 1980s as part of the Shnat Habonim Dror.
- Heinz Fischer, Austrian president, volunteered at Kibbutz Sarid at the age of 25 in 1963.
- Bob Hoskins, British actor and the star of Who Framed Roger Rabbit, volunteered at Kibbutz Zikim at the age of 25 in 1967.
- Boris Johnson, the former Mayor of London and British Prime Minister, spent the summer of 1984 volunteering at Kibbutz Kfar HaNassi in Northern Israel.
- Simon Le Bon, lead singer of Duran Duran, volunteered in Kibbutz Gvulot in 1978. The band's first album included a track called "Tel Aviv".
- Annie Leibovitz, American portrait photographer, volunteered at Kibbutz Amir at the age of 20 in 1969.
- Helen Mirren, British actress who starred in The Queen, volunteered in a Kibbutz for six months after the Six-Day War.
- Oliver Sacks, British neurologist, spent the summer of 1955 in Ein HaShofet.
- Bernie Sanders, American senator from Vermont, volunteered at Kibbutz Sha'ar HaAmakim in 1963.
- Jerry Seinfeld, American comedian and star of the television comedy Seinfeld, volunteered at the age of 17 in Kibbutz Sa'ar in 1971.
- Sigourney Weaver, American actress who starred in the Alien series, volunteered in a kibbutz for several months at the age of 18 in 1967.
- Debra Winger, American actress who spent four months at Kibbutz Beit Zera in 1972; in later years she has been a strong supporter of Palestinian rights.

== See also ==
- Agroecology
- Birthright Israel
- International volunteering
- Working holiday visa
- Youth village
