= Afikim =

Kibbutz in the Jordan Valley, Israel

Afikim: אפיקים (Hebrew)
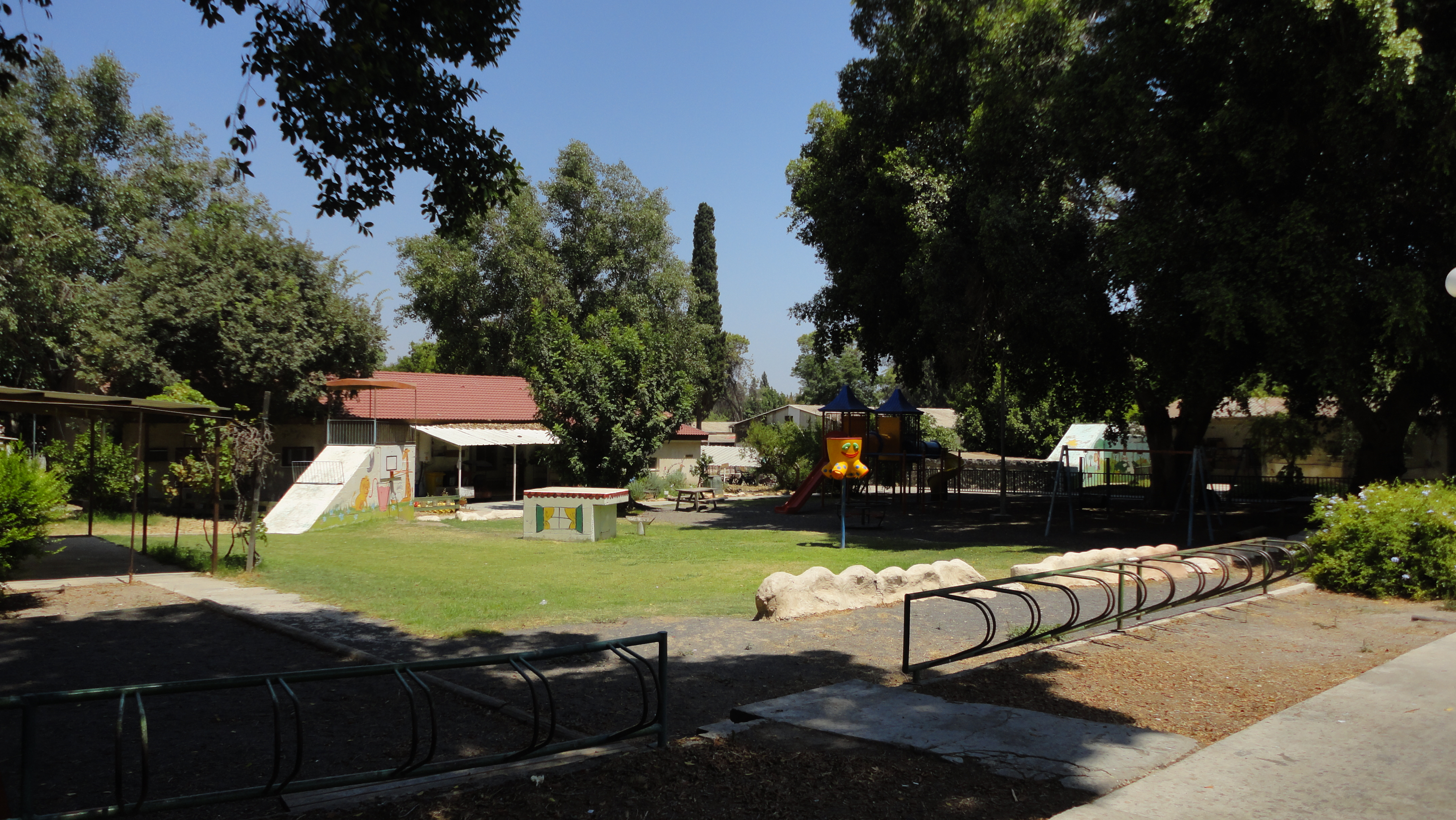

- Location within Northeast Israel Location within Israel
- Coordinates: 32°40′47″N 35°34′40″E
- Country: Israel
- District: Northern
- Subdistrict: Kinneret
- Region: Jordan Valley
- Affiliation: Kibbutz Movement
- Founded: 1932
- Founder: Russian Hashomer Hatzair Members
- Population (2024): 1,140

Afikim (Hebrew: אפיקים) is an Israeli kibbutz affiliated with the Kibbutz Movement located in the Jordan Valley three kilometers from the Sea of Galilee. It is within the jurisdiction of the Emek HaYarden Regional Council. In 2024 it had a population of 1,140.

== Etymology ==
The name Afikim means "riverbeds", and refers to the Jordan River and its tributary, the Yarmuk River, and is also taken from the Bible, Ezekiel 34:13: "I will pasture them ... in the riverbeds."

== History ==
Russian Jews affiliated with the Hashomer Hatzair movement organised in 1924 and settled in the area of Wazia in the Upper Galilee. In 1932 the group moved to its current location on a tract of land belonging to Degania Bet, where it absorbed groups from the Poale Zion movement and Hechalutz. The name "Afikim" was officially adopted in 1936. Yisrael Hofesh, one of the founders of the kibbutz, who died in 2011 at the age of 107, helped to establish the banana industry and worked in the plywood factory run by the kibbutz.

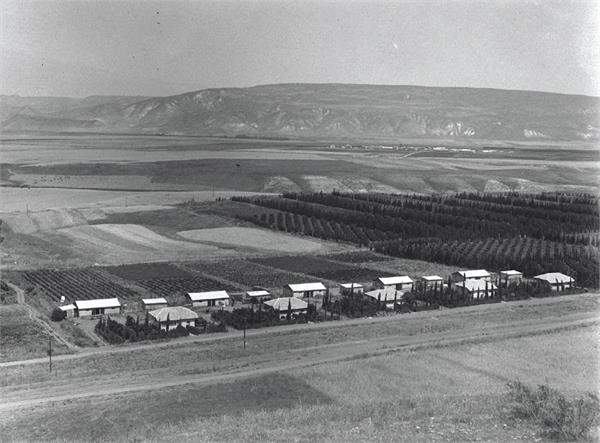
Afikim, 1937

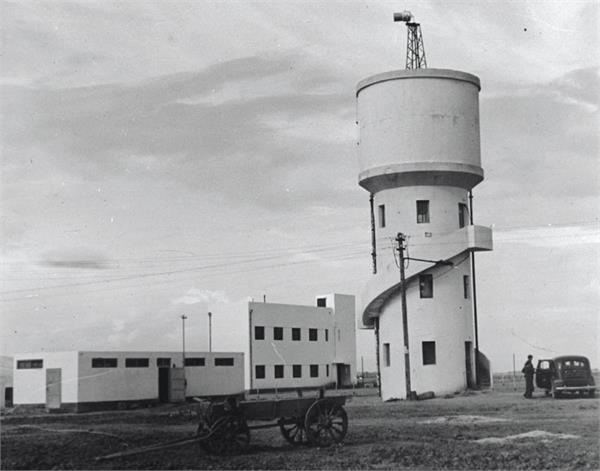
Afikim watchtower 1939

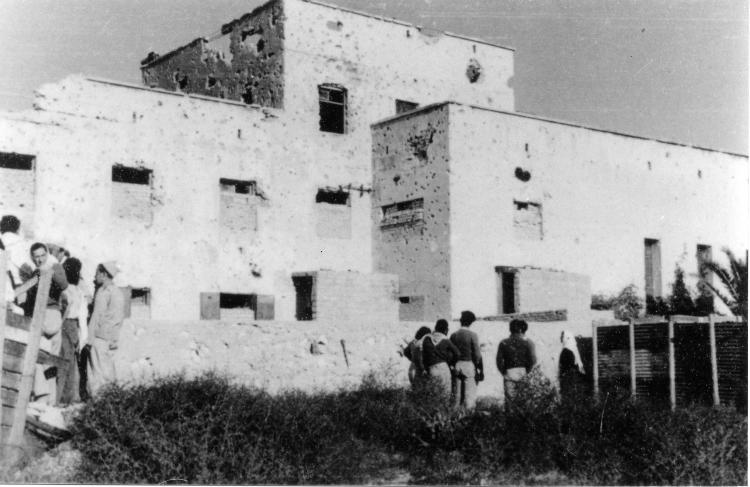
Afikim, 1948. Photograph from Palmach archive

During the 1948 Arab–Israeli War, Afikim was subjected to frequent shelling by Syrian and Iraqi forces, and was a stronghold of Palmach activity. Afterwards it was a center for agricultural training for IDF soldiers who planned to join kibbutzim after demobilization. During the split of the Kibbutz Meuhad movement, Afikim, unlike many other kibbutzim, did not split up into two villages. Rather it joined the Mapai-affiliated faction which went on to found the Ihud Kibbutzim. In 1977, Afikim hosted 66 refugees from Vietnam. In 2011, the kibbutz accepted 100 new members.

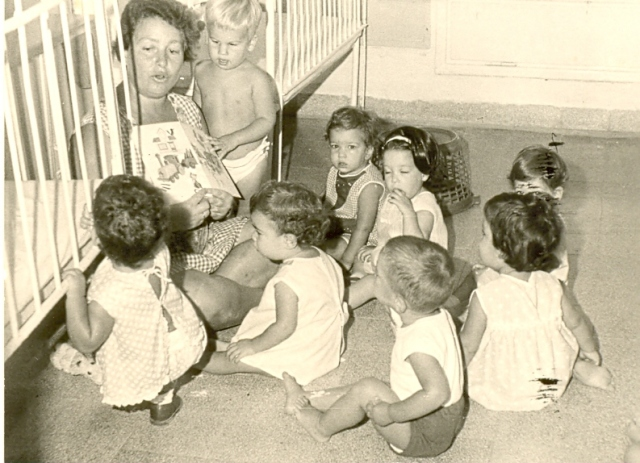
Kibbutz children in the children's house, 1960s

== Economy ==
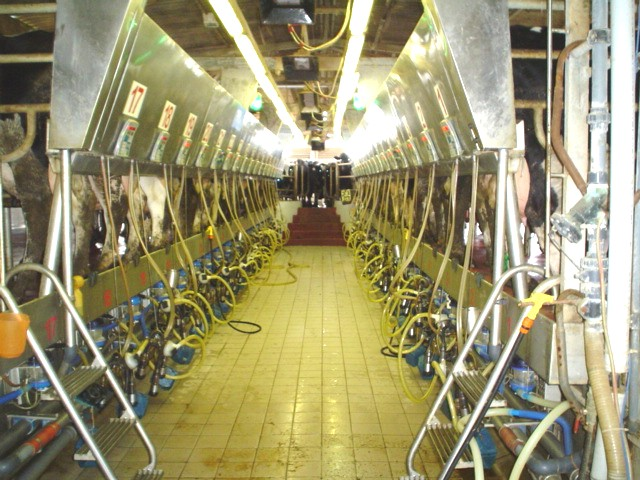
Afikim dairy

Afikim grows bananas, date palms, avocados, olives, subtropical flora, and grains. It also engages in aquaculture and dairy farming. The kibbutz has 400 cows. It operates Afimilk, a dairy equipment company, and Afikim Electric Vehicles, a producer of electric vehicles. In the 1980s, Afikim went through an economic crisis and was partially privatized.

In 2010, Afikim announced its partnership in a half-billion-dollar milk production project in Vietnam. The project involved establishing a dairy operation of 30,000 cows to supply 500,000 liters of milk a day, about 40% of Vietnam's present milk consumption. Afikim was responsible for all stages of the enterprise, including breeding and preparing land for crops used as feed. In addition to a demonstration farm with 174 cows established for educational purposes, a commercial milk farm with 20,000 cows, the TH Milk facility, was built in stages by 2015. The milk output per cow is 9,300 liters of milk annually despite tropical conditions.

== Inventions ==
The first electronic milk meter, which measures how many liters of milk a cow has produced, was invented at Afikim. Other inventions include the pedometer, which counts the number of steps a cow takes, indicating the right time for insemination; AfiFarm, a milking and dairy herd management software program; AfiAct, a fertility detection system; and AfiLab, a device that analyses the components of the milk and detects bacteria.

== Awards and recognition ==
In 2009, Assaf Inbari, a writer who grew up on the kibbutz, published Home, a novel based on the history of Afikim. It was awarded the 2010 Israel Book Publishers Association's Platinum Prize and was on the shortlist of finalists for the Sapir Prize for Literature.

In 2011, Afikim Electric Vehicles' Breeze-S scooter won Germany's Red Dot design award in the life science and medicine category.

Afikim is also the headquarters of the biggest music licensing company in Israel, Artlist, which converted the old community canteen into an office space.

== Notable people ==
- Assaf Inbari
- Yoel Palgi
- Leo Roth
- Zvi Brenner

== See also ==
- Agricultural research in Israel
- Israeli inventions and discoveries
- Israel–Vietnam relations
