= Home (Inbari novel) =

2009 novel by Israeli author Assaf Inbari

Home הביתה
- Cover of Home
- Author: Assaf Inbari
- Language: Hebrew
- Publisher: Yedioth Ahronoth / Hemed Books
- Publication date: 2009 (1st edition)
- Publication place: Israel
- Media type: Print (Hardcover)
- Pages: 276

Home (Hebrew: הביתה, habáyta) is the first novel by Israeli author Assaf Inbari. It was published in 2009 in Hebrew. It has not yet appeared in English translation.

It is composed of documentary materials, including passages from speeches, letters, kibbutz newsletter articles, minutes of meetings, and diaries.

== Plot ==
Home relates the history of Kibbutz Afikim over three generations, from its founding in the Jordan Valley in the early 1930s by members of the socialist–Zionist youth movement Hashomer Hatzair, through its growth and development, to its present form, beset by privatization and individualism.

== Reception ==
The novel was awarded the 2010 Israel Book Publishers Association's Platinum Prize and was on the shortlist of finalists for the Sapir Prize for Literature.

Maariv called the novel "impressive" and said the author "has invented a new genre: the biography of a place, and the kibbutz is a character whose history we follow."Eretz Acheret hailed Inbari's debut as "an impressive literary achievement" and likened the book's narrative voice to a "brilliant soloist": "A book like this could never have been written by a kibbutz community. The solitariness of that voice is a heroic revolt against the choir as it memorializes the choir in a literary work." Haaretz was more reserved, noting that Inbari failed to penetrate the inner lives of his subjects and that "in most cases they remain cardboard characters who advance the overall plot but are not sufficiently fleshed out." On the other hand, another writer for Haaretz, who grew up on nearby Ashdot Ya'akov, felt that the description of Afikim in Home rang true as "a kind of distilled and intense precis" of life on a kibbutz.

Writing in the academic journal Hebrew Studies, Shula Keshet argued at length that Inbari's "transformation of documentary material, and his sophisticated use of the collective voice, which is also simultaneously personal, makes this novel an innovative and complex work of art."

== Influences ==
The 2010 film Habaita, directed by Oded Hirsch, is named after the novel.
