= Jacob Pins =

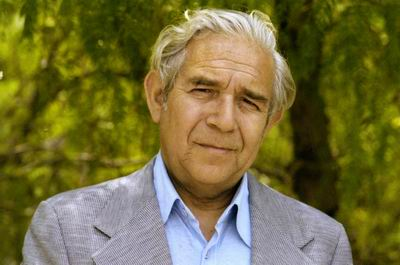
Jacob Pins

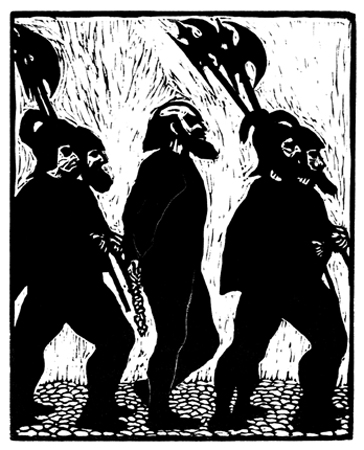
"In Chains", From Woodcuts for Heinrich von Kleist’s Michael Kohlhaas (1953/2003), woodcut, Jerusalem Print Workshop.

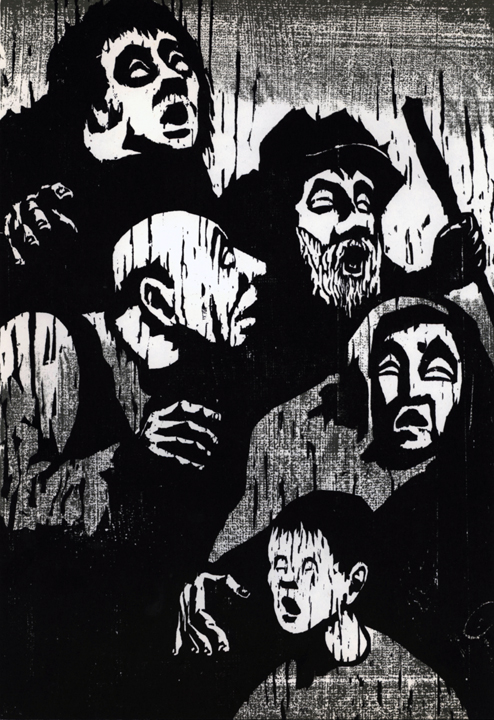
Blind People (1957), woodcut

Jacob Otto Pins (Hebrew: יעקב פינס; 17 January 1917 – 4 December 2005) was a German-born Israeli woodcut artist and art collector, particularly of Japanese prints and paintings.

== Biography ==
Jacob Pins was born in Höxter, Germany, the son of Dr Leo Pins, a veterinarian, and his wife Ida Lipper. He immigrated to Palestine in 1936 to study art. His father tried to discourage him from becoming an artist for financial reasons. Pins's younger brother, Rudolph, (1920–2016) moved to the United States in 1934. His father was sent to Buchenwald. In July 1944, both parents died in the Riga Ghetto.

Pins first lived on a kibbutz, which was disbanded in 1941. He moved to Jerusalem and studied woodcut and linocut under woodcut master and painter Jacob Steinhardt, also a German immigrant, at his small private school. He lived in poverty in a tiny room, subsisting on a meagre diet. He continued his studies at the new Bezalel Academy of Art and Design.

Pins was married to Elsa, the subject of a number of his prints. They had no children.

Pins bought his first Oriental print in 1945, and acquired a house on Ethiopia Street, opposite the Ethiopian church, where he lived for the rest of his life. He continued collecting until his death and was one of Israel's foremost art collectors. His book on Japanese Pillar prints, Hashira-e is the definitive work on the subject.

Pins died in Jerusalem in December 2005.

== Art career ==
Pins' artwork was heavily influenced by German expressionism and traditional Japanese wood block printing. From 1956 to 1977, he taught at Israel's leading art schools, most notably Bezalel, where he later became a professor. He was known as a demanding teacher, emphasizing strong technical skills and discipline.

In the 1950s, Pins helped to found the Jerusalem Artists' House, a centre for the city's artists to meet and exhibit.

== Legacy ==
Pins' extensive collection of Japanese woodprints, paintings and sculptures was left to the Israel Museum, where it forms the Jacob Pins Collection. Most of his own artwork was left to his home town and the Forum Jacob Pins museum opened there in 2008. Nimrod Erez made a feature-length documentary about Pins, and this is in the permanent collection of MOMA, New York. A shorter documentary is on exhibition at the Jacob Pins Forum, Höxter. The Jacob Pins Collection became a laureate of the WWKulturpreis (WestphaliaWeser Cultural Award) of the energy company Westfalen Weser Energie [ge].

== Exhibitions ==
Jacob Pins: Woodcuts: Herzliya Museum of Art, December 92 – January 93

== Published works ==
- Jacob Pins Woodcuts. Exhibition catalog, Boston, Boston Public Library, 1953. Paperback, 15 pp with six black and white woodcuts.
- Master woodcuts by Jacob Pins. Oblong octavo, staples paper covers, 12pp., b/w illustrations. Introduction by Ruth Eis. A short catalog of the exhibition, May 5 – June 30, 1974, Judah L. Magnes Museum, Berkeley, California, 1974
- The Japanese Pillar Print, Hashira-e London Robert G Sawers Publishing, 1982, 389 pages, 14 pages in color and 1039/XXV11 illustrations in black and white.
- The Pins Collection: Chinese and Japanese paintings and prints. Israel Museum, Israel, 1980
- The Jacob Pins Collection of Japanese Prints, Paintings and Sculptures. Israel Museum (Jerusalem) 1994 (ISBN 9652781614).

== See also ==
- Visual arts in Israel
