= Assaf Inbari =

Israeli novelist and journalist (born 1968)

- אסף ענברי
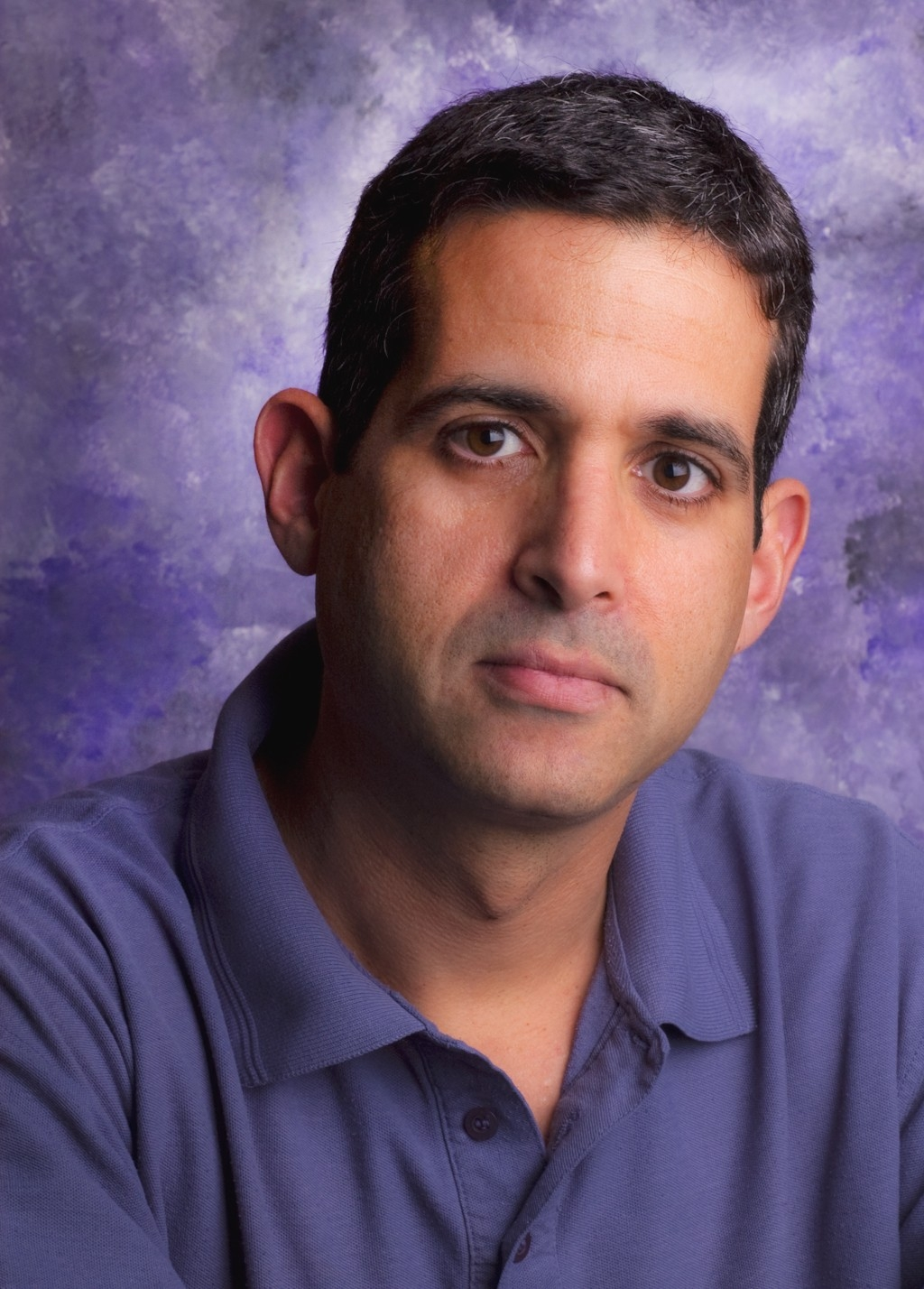
- Born: March 9, 1968 (age 58)
- Occupations: Writer and journalist
- Writing career
- Notable work: Home (Hebrew: הביתה)

Assaf Inbari (Hebrew: אסף ענברי; born March 9, 1968) is an Israeli novelist and journalist. He is the Asper Chair in Zionist Studies at Shalem College in Jerusalem and teaches at Kinneret College and Alma College (Tel Aviv).

== Biography ==
Assaf Inbari was born and raised on Kibbutz Afikim, the oldest of three children, and lived there until the age of 20. He studied Hebrew literature and comparative literature at the Adi Lautman Interdisciplinary Program for Outstanding Students of Tel Aviv University. In 2008 he completed his Ph.D. on the poetry of Hayim Nahman Bialik at Bar-Ilan University.

In 2005 he married Naomi. They have a son and a daughter. He lives on Kibbutz Degania B.

== Literary career ==
In 2009 he published his first novel Home (Hebrew: הביתה). It relates the history of Afikim over three generations, from its founding in the Jordan Valley in the early 1930s by members of the socialist–Zionist youth movement Hashomer Hatzair, through its growth and development, to its present form, beset by privatization and individualism. The novel was awarded the 2010 Israel Book Publishers Association's Platinum Prize and was on the shortlist of finalists for the Sapir Prize for Literature.

In 2020 Inbari was awarded the Agnon Prize for the Art of Prose.

== Published works ==
=== Fiction ===
- Home (Hebrew: הביתה) (Yedioth Ahronoth/Hemed Books, 2009) [Hebrew].
- The Tank (Hebrew: הטנק) (Yedioth Ahronoth/Hemed Books, 2018) [Hebrew].
- The Red Book (Hebrew: הספר האדום) (Yedioth Ahronoth/Hemed Books, 2022) [Hebrew].

=== Essays ===
- "The Kibbutz Novel as Erotic Melodrama" (March 2012), Vol. 31, No. 1 Journal of Israeli History, pp. 129–146.
- "The Spectacles of Isaiah Berlin" (Spring 2006), Azure, pp. 82–112.
- "Towards A Hebrew Literature" (Spring 2000), Azure, pp. 99–154.
- "Zionism's New Challenge" (Winter 2008), Azure, pp. 81–109.

=== Articles ===
- "The Age of Post-Nostalgia", Haaretz, 15 September 2012.
- "The End of the Secular Majority", Haaretz, 3 February 2012.
- "The Finishing Touch", Eretz acheret, 17 September 2009.
- "New Age: The Fall of the Secular State", Haaretz, September 1999.

== See also ==
- Israeli literature
