= Zvi Brenner =

Zionist leader (1915–1999)

- צבי ברנר
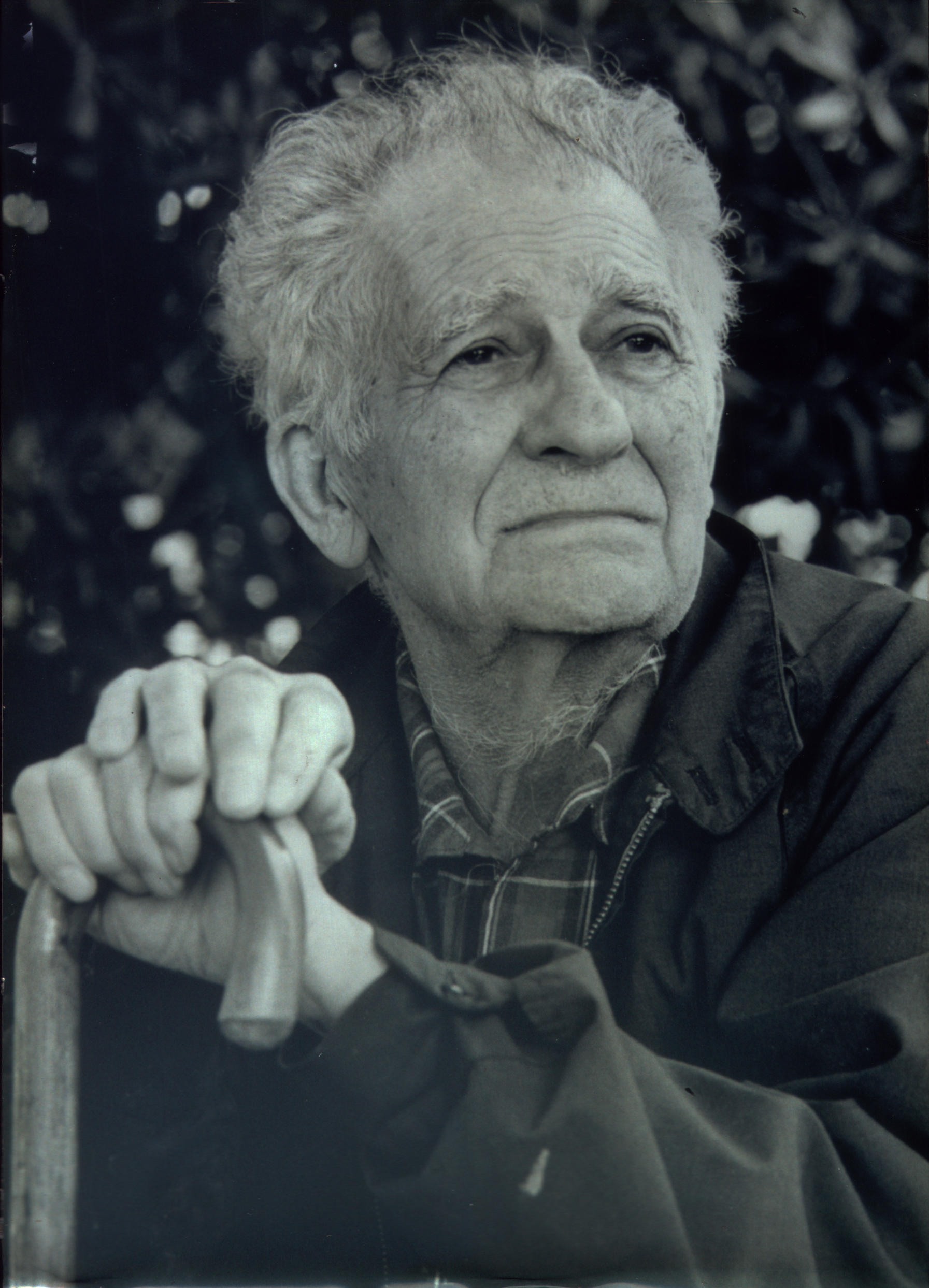
- Born: 1915; Poland
- Died: 1999 (aged 83–84); Israel
- Known for: Zionist Leader

Zvi Brenner (Hebrew: צבי ברנר; 1915–1999) was a Jewish soldier in Palestine before and during World War II and the early days of the State of Israel. He trained under Orde Wingate and served alongside Moshe Dayan. He was one of the founders of the Israel Defense Forces along with Dayan and Yigal Allon. After being wounded badly, he later served as the Secretary of the Kibbutzim Movement. He was a leader of kibbutz Afikim until his death.

== Early life ==
Born in Poland in 1915, Zvi immigrated as a child to the United States with his mother and siblings, settling in Chicago. There he was one of the founders of the Hechalutz movement in the U.S. He was chosen in 1934 to join the new kibbutz Afikim being established in Israel.

== Palestine and the Special Night Squads ==
Zvi joined the Haganah and participated in operations, including a defense of kibbutz Ramat HaKovesh and the establishment of kibbutz Hanita in 1938. It was in Hanita that Zvi was introduced to the British Captain Charles Orde Wingate. Wingate established the Special Night Squads (SNS), which were units of Jews and British soldiers. Zvi was made the commander of the SNS unit operating out of Afikim.

== World War II ==
When Palestinian Jews were allowed to join the British Army to fight the Nazis, Zvi, newly married and a father, disobeyed Haganah orders and volunteered. Eventually, the Jewish Brigade was formed in 1944. In March 1945, the Jewish Brigade fought the Germans on the front lines in northern Italy, where Zvi suffered a serious injury to his leg from a grenade.
