= Arieh Allweil =

Israeli artist (1902–1975)

Arieh Allweil אריה אלואיל
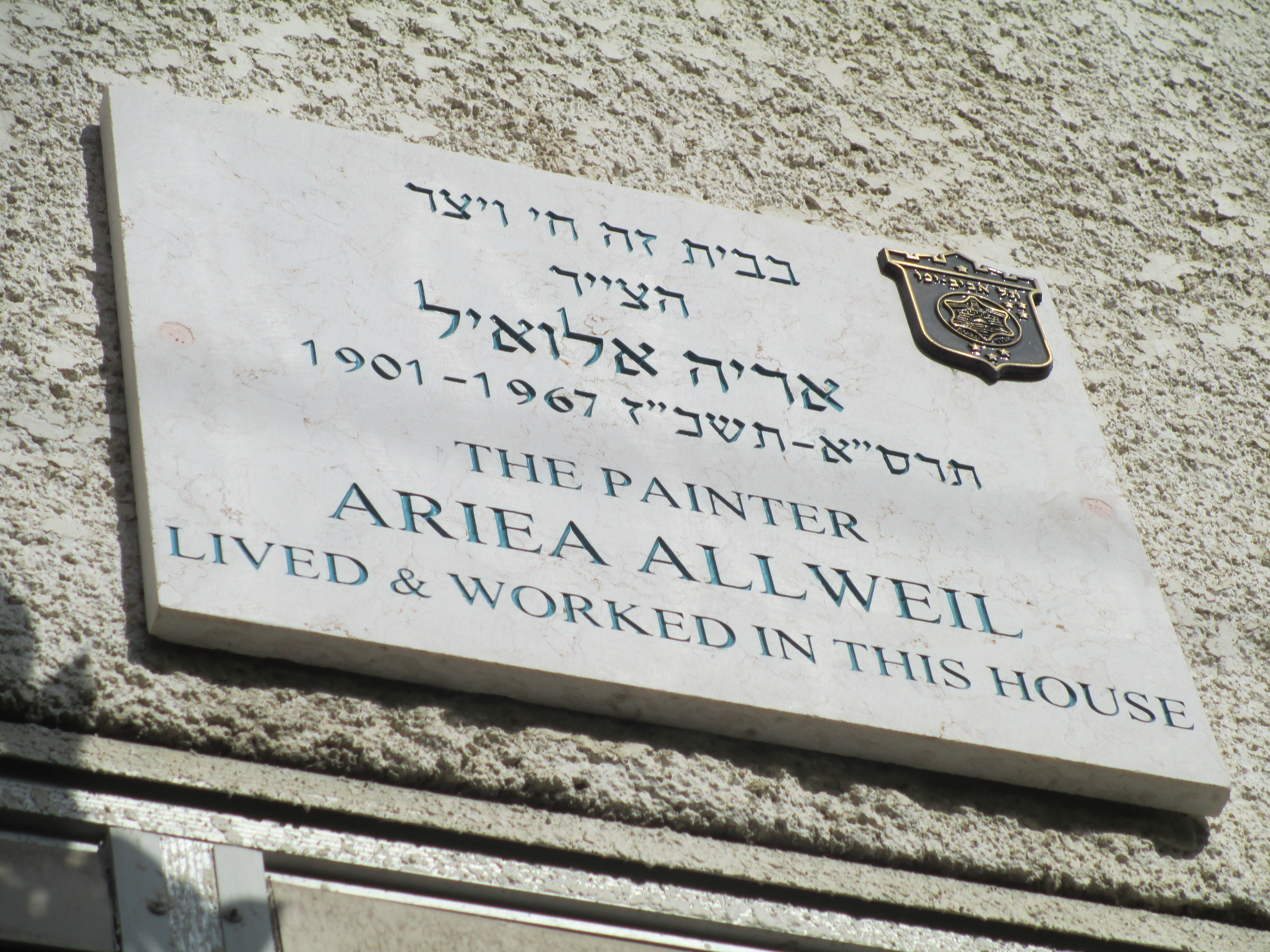
- Arieh Allweil Memorial in Tel Aviv
- Born: March 11, 1901; Galicia_(Eastern_Europe), Poland
- Died: 1967; Safed, Israel
- Education: Academy of Fine Arts Vienna
- Known for: Graphic artist
- Movement: Israeli art
- Awards: Dizengoff Price

Arieh Allweil Hebrew: אריה אלואיל, romanized: 1901–19670 is an Israeli artist best known as Israel's preeminent landscape painter.

== Biography ==
Allweil was born in the town of Bubarka near Lviv, in Galicia (Austria; after the war in Poland; today in Ukraine). During the First World War, from 1914 to 1918, he moved with his family to Vienna, where he attended high school. When he returned to Bubarka, he founded the Hashomer Hatzair youth movement in his town, and in 1920 he immigrated to Israel as a pioneer. Allweil was one of the founders of Beitania Illit, which was the first settlement attempt in the country of the youth movement.

In 1921 he went to study painting at the Academy of Fine Arts Vienna. While in Vienna, he exhibited a number of paintings in an exhibition by the Kunstschau group founded by Gustav Klimt.

In 1926, Allweil returned through Paris and Italy to the Land of Israel. He settled in Tel Aviv at 59 Melchett Street, but spent long periods in various places in the Land of Israel in order to paint, mainly in Shefaya, and Jerusalem. Starting in 1952 he spent long periods in his residence in Safed, in parallel to his home in Tel Aviv.

Allweil was one of the founders of the Association of Painters in Israel and illustrated several books, including "Stories of the Founders of the Tel Aviv Museum," which was published in 1932, and in 1953, he participated in the opening exhibition of his Passover Haggadah. Allweil participated in several solo exhibitions, including "Stories of the Founders of the Tel Aviv Museum," which was published in 1956. In 1938, Allweil won the Dizengoff Prize for painting nature and landscape paintings. He exhibited several solo exhibitions exploring landscape of Israel, including at the Israel Museum in Jerusalem and Tel Aviv Museum of Art.

Allweil was married for four years to poet and author Esther Raab (1894-1981). In 1938, he married Rachel Bograshov (1908–1996), a first-grade children's painter and teacher, daughter of Dr. Haim Bograshov (Hebrew educator, one of the founders of the Herzliya Hebrew Gymnasium, a Zionist activist and a member of the Second Knesset, and was married to her until his death. Allweil died in Safed on May 7, 1967,and is buried in the cemetery in Safed.

Allweil was the father of two daughters and a son of his second wife, Rachel.

== Awards and recognition ==
- 1933 פרס_דיזנגוף for Painting and Sculpture
- 1955 פרס_דיזנגוף for Painting and Sculpture

== Education ==
- 1921 Academy of Fine Arts Vienna

== See also ==
- Visual arts in Israel
