= Ofer Lellouche =

Israeli artist

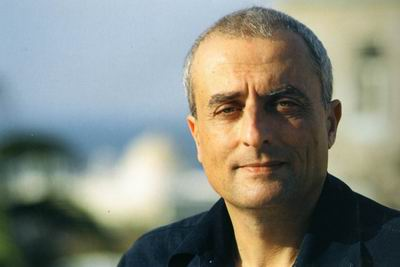
Ofer Lellouche in 1998.

Ofer Lellouche (Hebrew: עופר ללוש; born 19 April 1947 in Tunis) is an Israeli painter, sculptor, etcher and video artist.

== Biography ==
Lellouche was born in Tunisia in 1947. He studied mathematics and physics in Paris at Saint Louis College. In 1966, two months before he was scheduled to graduate, he ran away to Kibbutz Yehiam in Israel. In 1968, during his service in the Israel Defense Forces, he contracted hepatitis and began to paint while recovering. He began his formal art training at the Avni Institute of Art and Design in Tel Aviv under the abstract lyrical painter Yehezkiel Streichman.

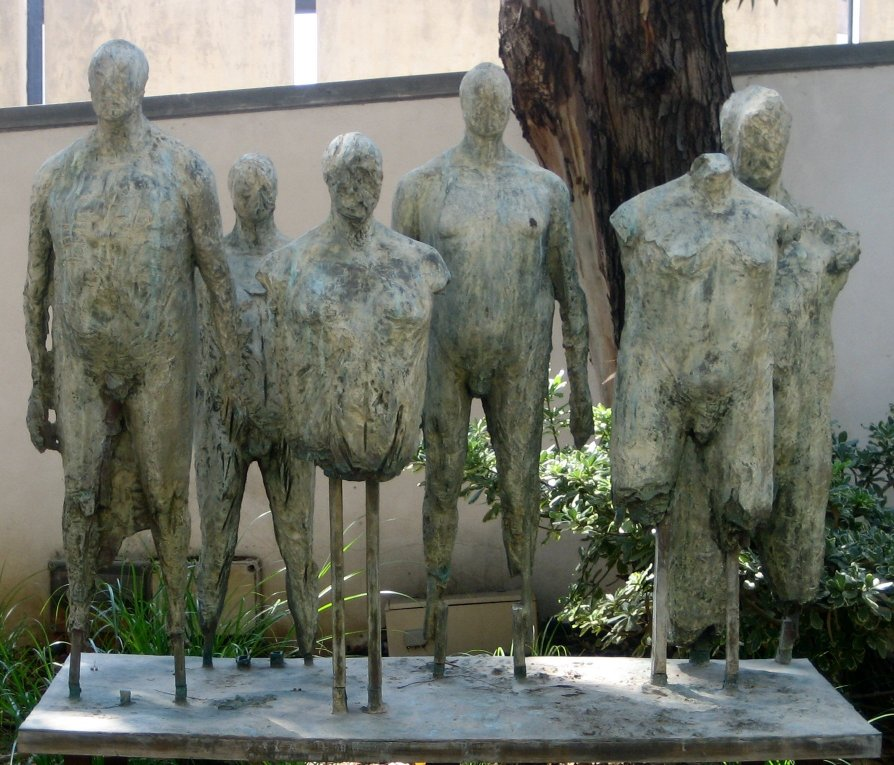
'The Atelier', plaster and iron sculpture by Ofer Lellouche, 2001, Tel Aviv Museum of Art, Tel Aviv, Israel

He returned to Paris to study with the sculptor César Baldaccini (1921–1998) and earn a master's degree in literature with a thesis on Stéphane Mallarmé. In the late 1970s, he worked in video art and painted self-portraits. During the coming years, he drew and etched self-portraits, often in violent industrial colors.

In 1979, he produced several videos related to the subject of the mirror. In the early 1980s, he began painting landscapes in addition to self-portraits. His 1987 painting "Figure in a Landscape" was exhibited at the 19th São Paulo Art Biennial.

In the early 1990s, Lellouche produced more than 600 etchings, illustrated Stéphane Mallarmé's poem, "Un coup de dés jamais n'abolira le hasard", and published the books "Panim" (faces) and "Ein Karem". He also produced large-format paintings, which he called the "Atelier César" in homage to his former teacher. In 1991, he returned to Paris and visited the location of César's studio, where he found some clay models on their bases and decided to make a series of works that would remind him of what he had seen. Since the late 1990s, he has been engaged primarily in sculpture and etching.

In 2023, A major retrospective exhibition were held at the Albertina Museum, Vienna.

== Solo Exhibitions ==
- 2023 - Ofer Lellouche: New Works and Artist Book Launch, Gordon Gallery, Tel Aviv, Israel
- 2023 - A Retrospective, The Albertina Museum, Vienna
- 2021 - New works, Gordon Gallery, Jerusalem, Israel
- 2020 - New Sculptures, Gordon Gallery, Tel Aviv, Israel
- 2018 - Atelier, Gordon Gallery, Tel Aviv, Israel
- 2017 - Gordon Gallery, Tel Aviv, Israel
- 2014 - The Hymalayas Museum, Shanghai
- 2014 - Galerie Ditesheim Maffei, Neuchatel, Switzerland
- 2013 - Zemack Gallery, Tel Aviv, Israel
- 2012 - The CAFA Museum, Beijing
- 2011 - Installation of sculpture Head II, Tel Aviv Museum, Israel
- 2008 - The Tel Aviv Museum of Art, (A head for Meina), Tel Aviv, Israel
- 2008 - Jan Krugier Gallery, Geneva
- 2006 - Installation of sculpture “Two”, Garden of sculpture, Israel Museum, Jerusalem, Israel
- 2006 - The Open Museum, Tefen, Israel
- 2001 - "Ofer Lellouche self-portrait 1977-2001", The Tel Aviv Museum of Art, Tel Aviv, Israel
- 1998 - Musée Fleury, Lodève, France
- 1997 - Musée des Beaux Arts, Chartres, France
- 1997 - DeBeyerd Museum, Breda, Holland
- 1994 - The Genia Shreiber University Gallery, Tel Aviv, Israel
- 1993 - The Calouste Gulbenkian Fondation, Lisbonne, Portugal
- 1990 - Mabel Semmler Gallery, Paris, France
- 1980 - Gordon Gallery, Tel Aviv, Israel
