= Hermann Struck =

German Jewish artist (1876–1944)

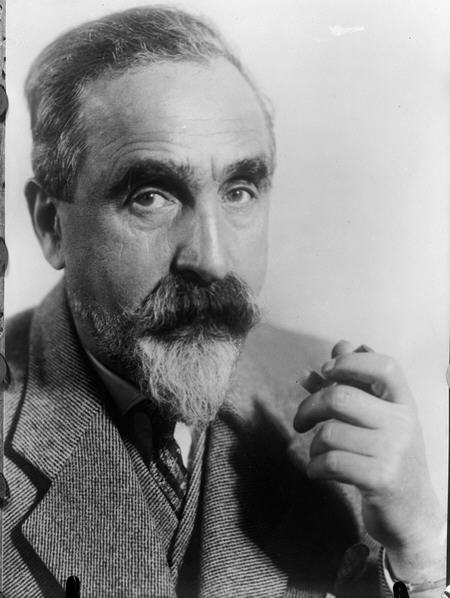
- Hermann Struck, 1944
- Born: Chaim Aaron ben David; 6 March 1876; Berlin, Kingdom of Prussia, German Empire
- Died: 11 January 1944 (aged 67); Haifa, Mandatory Palestine
- Education: Berlin Academy of Fine Arts
- Occupations: Artist, Etcher
- Known for: Etchings
- Notable work: Die Kunst des Radierens
- Awards: Iron Cross 1st Class

Hermann Struck (6 March 1876 – 11 January 1944) was a German Jewish artist known for his etchings.

== Biography ==
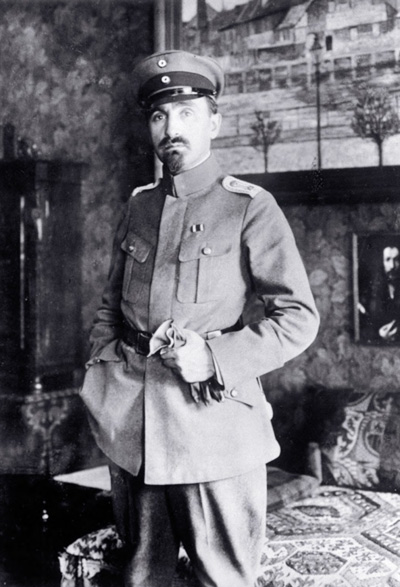
Hermann Struck, 1916

Hermann Struck (Chaim Aaron ben David) was born in Berlin. He studied at the Berlin Academy of Fine Arts. In 1904, he joined the modern art movement known as the Berlin Secession. In 1900, Struck met Jozef Israëls, a Dutch artist, who became his mentor. Both were recognized as leading artists of their time.

In 1908, Struck published "Die Kunst des Radierens" ("The Art of Etching"), which became a seminal work on the subject. It was a textbook that offered both theory and practical instruction. Struck's students included Marc Chagall, Lovis Corinth, Jacob Steinhardt, Lesser Ury and Max Liebermann.

In 1899, upon completing his studies at the Berlin Academy, he was banned from teaching there because he was Jewish. He signed his work with his Hebrew name, Chaim Aaron ben David, and a Star of David. Struck did commission portraits of Ibsen, Nietzsche, Freud, Albert Einstein, Herzl, Oscar Wilde and other leading figures of the time.

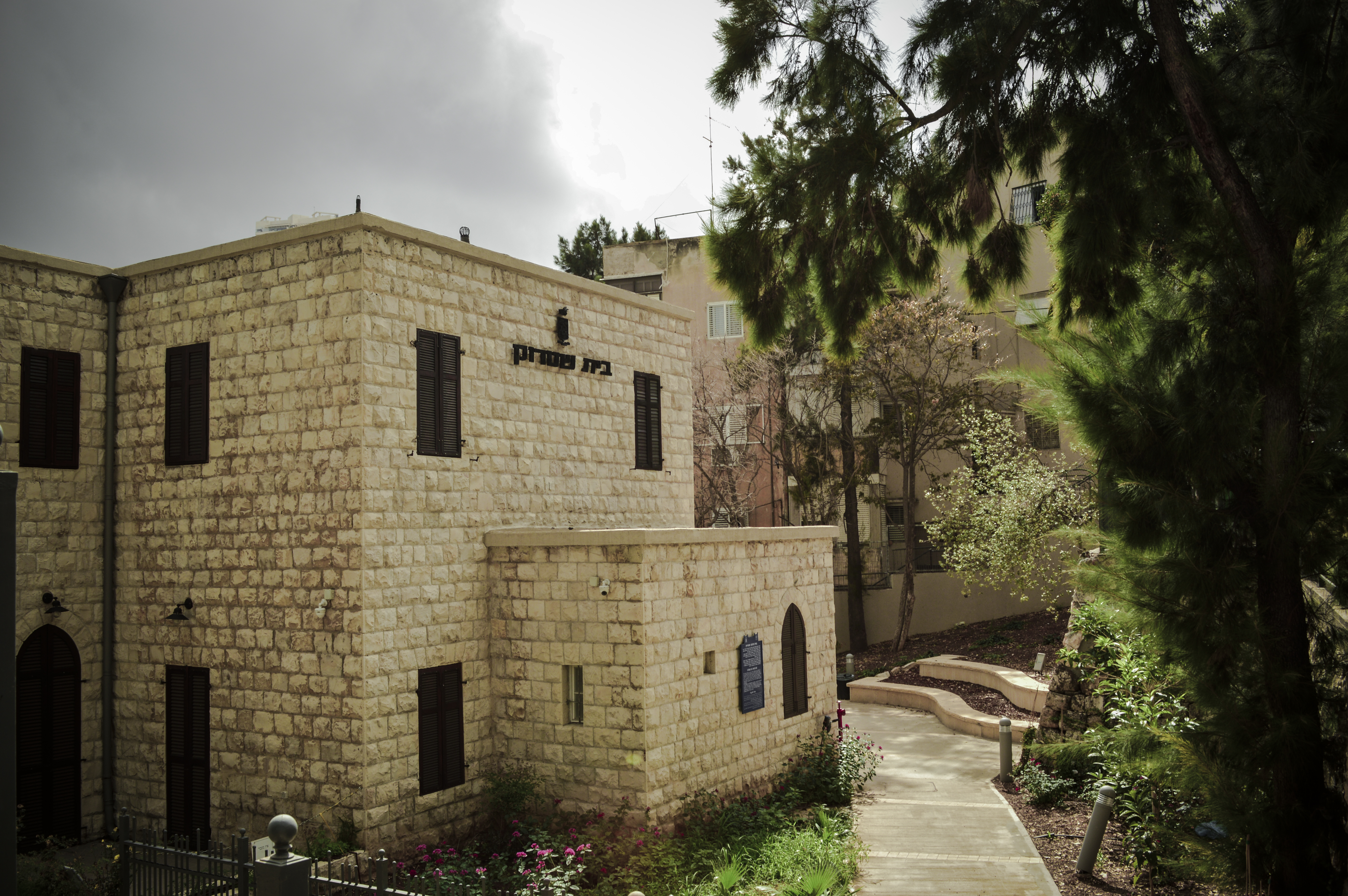
Hermann Struck Museum, Haifa

Struck was a fervent Zionist and Jewish activist. He visited the Land of Israel in 1903, then part of the Ottoman Empire, and displayed his art at the Fifth Zionist Congress, and was a founder of the Mizrachi Religious Zionist movement. At the same time, he was a German patriot and volunteered for military service in World War I serving as a translator, liaison officer and military artist. He was awarded the Iron Cross 1st Class and promoted to an officer for bravery, in 1917 he became the referent for Jewish affairs at the German Eastern Front High Command.

Struck immigrated to Palestine in 1922, taught at Bezalel Academy and helped establish the Tel Aviv Museum of Art. He visited Berlin every summer until the Nazis rose to power.

He died in Haifa, Mandatory Palestine in 1944.

== Collections ==
=== Hermann Struck Museum ===
Struck's home in Haifa has been open as the Hermann Struck Museum since 2013. It preserves and displays Struck's personal items, books, and oil paintings, operates a children's creativity center, and offers workshops in printmaking, sculpture, and painting. The museum also runs a program of temporary exhibitions of art relating to Struck's work or themes.

=== Other institutions ===
Besides the Hermann Struck Museum, Struck's work is held in the collections of several other institutions worldwide. These include the Brooklyn Museum, the Jewish Museum (Manhattan), the Haifa Museum of Art, the Leo Baeck Institute, New York, the University of Michigan Museum of Art, the British Museum, the Museum of New Zealand Te Papa Tongarewa, and the Fine Arts Museums of San Francisco.

== Selected works ==
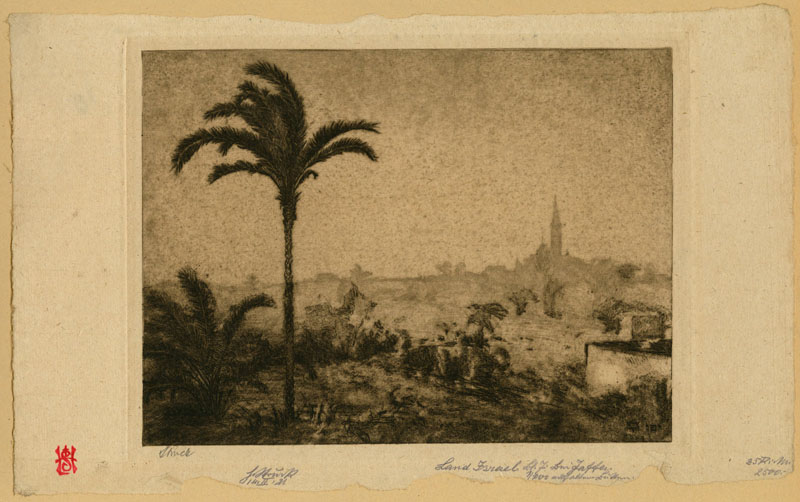
Jaffa

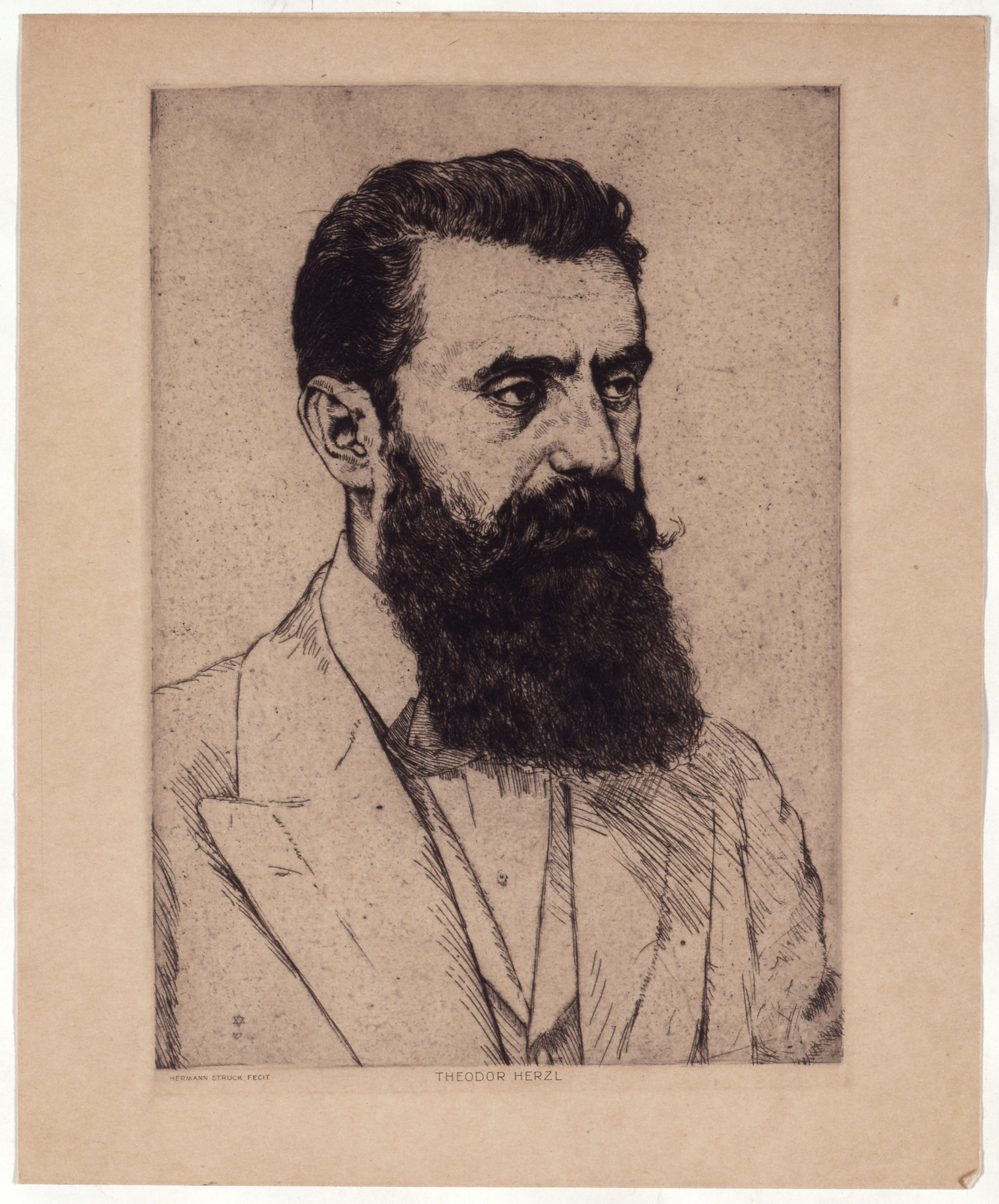
Portrait of Theodor Herzl

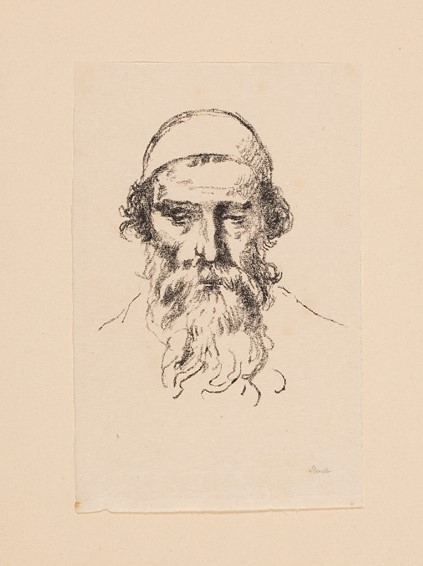
Lithograph of a rabbi. In the collection of the Jewish Museum of Switzerland.

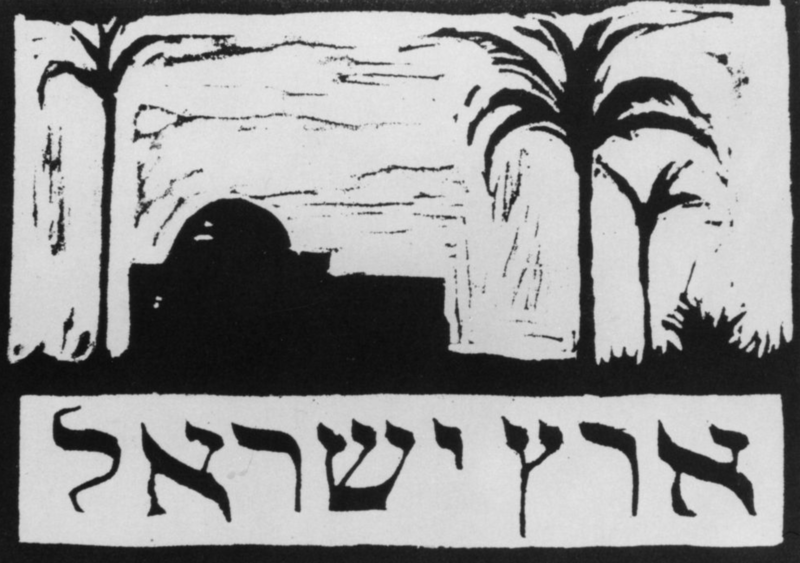
Woodcut by Hermann Struck which reads "The land of Israel" in Hebrew. In the Leo Baeck Institute's collection.

== See also ==
- Israeli art
