= Leo Roth =

Israeli painter (1914–2002)

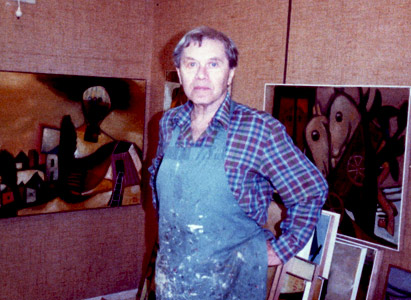
Leo Roth, 1975

Leo Roth, Flute Players, oil on canvas, 1967

Leo Roth (1914–2002), also known as Lior Roth, was an Israeli painter, born in 1914 in Austria-Hungary.

In 1920, Roth moved to Germany and, in 1933, immigrated to Palestine. He studied at the École des Beaux-Arts in Paris and completed frescoes in Italy and France in the 1950s. Roth first settled in Tel Aviv, then moved to Kvutzat Kinneret, then finally to Kibbutz Afikim where he remained until his death. He served as Director of the Art Academy of the Kibbutzim. In 1959, he was awarded the Jordan Valley Prize for Painting. Roth exhibited in the United States, Israel, Mexico, Spain, Holland, Sweden, and Denmark. He died in 2002.

Roth's work was influenced by Cubism and bears much in common with the work of compatriot painter Naftali Bezem. His colourful canvases contain biblical imagery and references to early Israeli pioneer culture.

== Selected exhibitions ==
- 2000: Chaim Atar Art Museum, Ein Harod, Israel: The Works of Leo Roth: An Exhibition

== Selected collections ==
- Israel Museum, Jerusalem
- Museum of Art Ein Harod, Israel

== Published works ==
- Reproductions in Colour and Black & White (Reproduktsyot bi-tsevaim uve-shahor-lavan) [portfolio of plates]. [1973].
