= Larry Abramson =

Israeli artist (born 1954)

Larry Abramson לארי אברמסון
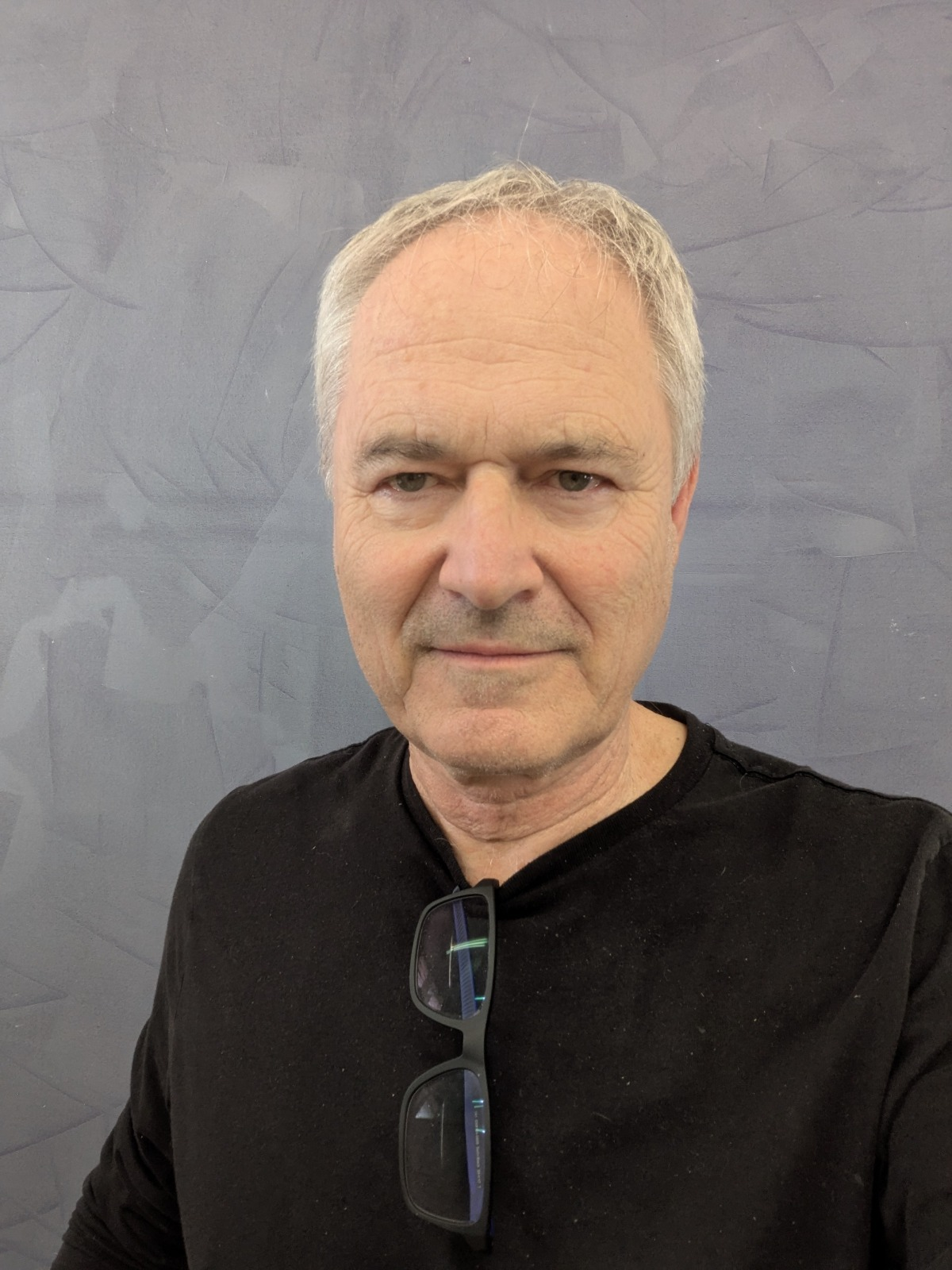
- Abramson in 2025
- Born: 1954 (age 71–72); South Africa
- Education: Chelsea College of Art and Design
- Known for: Painting
- Notable work: Hevel (1989–1990)
- Movement: Israeli art

Larry Abramson (Hebrew: לארי אברמסון; born 1954) is a South African-born Israeli artist.

== Biography ==
Larry Abramson was born in 1954 in South Africa. In 1961, his family immigrated to Israel and lived in Jerusalem. He attended high school in the Hebrew University Secondary School. In 1970, as a high school senior, he was one of the signators of a conscientious objectors to Israeli rejection of Egyptian President Nasser's peace initiative. In 1973 Abramson studied a Foundation Course at the Chelsea College of Art and Design, London. Upon his return to Israel he took a position as printer and curator of exhibitions at the Jerusalem Print Workshop, where he worked for nine years, until 1986.

== Art career ==
Abramson's first solo exhibition was in 1975. His work during the 1980s dealt with a variety of iconic symbols from modernist European art, particularly the "Black Square" by Kazimir Malevich, which he used to create dynamic situations combining abstraction and a figurative art idiom.

During 1993 and 1994 Abramson created the series of work "tsooba," which was exhibited at the Kibbutz Art Gallery, Tel Aviv. The series was composed of 38 landscape paintings (oil on canvas), 38 impressions on newspaper of the landscape paintings, and a group of still life paintings after samples of flora taken from the site.

This series relates to a mound of ruins near Kibbutz Tzova, a site which was painted a decade earlier by the artist Joseph Zaritsky. While Zaritsky ignored the Palestinian ruins found on the site and thus abstracted the landscape, Abramson painted the view realistically and then defaced it. By "seeing" the ruins of the Palestinian village, he criticizes the Israeli point of view which seeks to erase the Palestinian identity from the appropriated territory.

In 1984, Abramson joined the teaching staff of the art department of the Bezalel Academy of Arts and Design in Jerusalem. In 1992, he was appointed head of the Fine Art department, and in 1996, he founded and headed the Bezalel Program for Young Artists (Master of Fine Art).

In 2000 and 2003, he was invited as a guest lecturer at the San Francisco Art Institute, and in 2002, he joined the academic team planning the establishment of a new art department at the Shenkar College of Engineering and Design in Ramat Gan, Israel.

In May 2002, Abramson published in the journal Studio an article entitled "We Are All Felix Nussbaum", in which he raised the problematic relationship between art and history in the post-Holocaust era.

In 2005, Abramson mounted an exhibition of works under the name "The Pile," which included charcoal drawings of piles of construction debris, relating to the issue of representation of ruins in art and the figure of Jewish-German painter Felix Nussbaum. This series was exhibited at the Felix Nussbaum Haus Museum in Osnabrück, (Germany, and at the Chaim Atar Museum of Art on Kibbutz Ein Harod in the Jezreel Valley.

In 2007, Abramson held an exhibition of recent paintings at the Gordon Gallery in Tel Aviv, and in 2010, an extensive retrospective exhibition of his work was held at the Tel Aviv Museum of Art.

== Awards and recognition ==
- 1979 The Beatrice S. Kolliner Award for a Young Israeli Artist, Israel Museum, Jerusalem
- 1988 America Israel Cultural Foundation
- 1991 Jacques Ohana Prize, Tel Aviv Museum of Art
- 1993 Sharet Award for Culture and Art, Science, Culture and Sport Minister of Israel
- 1998 The Minister of Education, Culture Prize, Ministry of Culture and Education
- 2007 Mendel and Eva Pundik Prize for Israeli Art, Tel Aviv Museum of Art

== Gallery ==
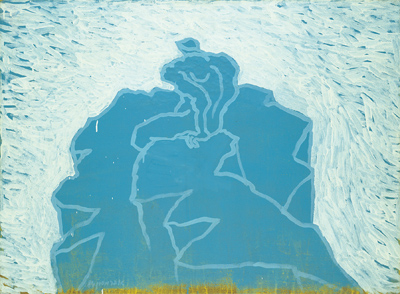
Nevo, 1984
acrylic on canvas
private collection

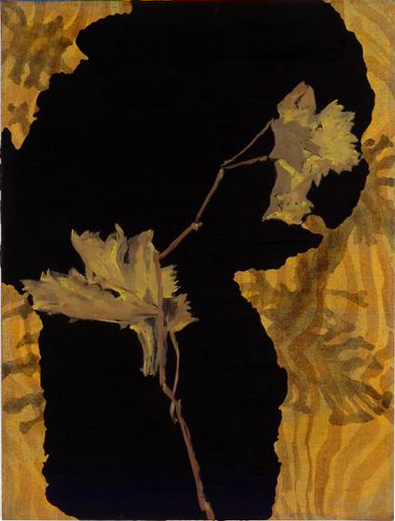
Beam XXIII (From the series "Beams"), 1992
Israel Museum Collection
B94.0723

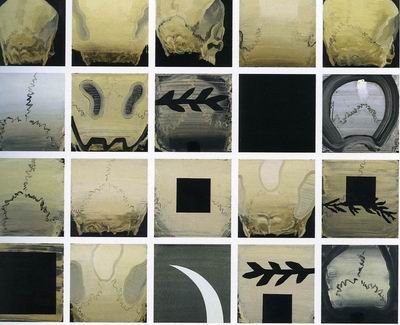
Hevel, 1989-1990
Israel Museum Collection
B94.0029

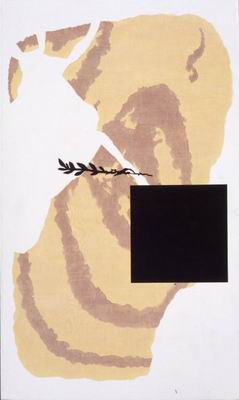
Return of the Black Square IV, 1990
Israel Museum Collection
B92.1558

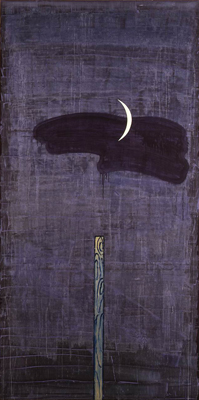
Column VII, 1988
Israel Museum Collection
B90.0049

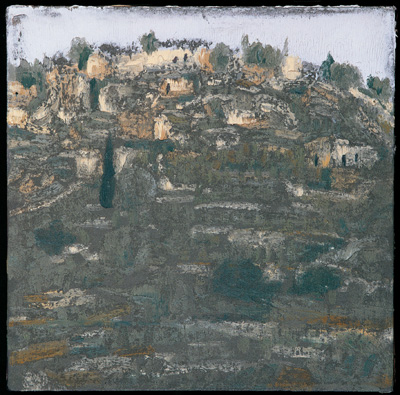
from tsoba, 1993-4
oil on canvas
private collection

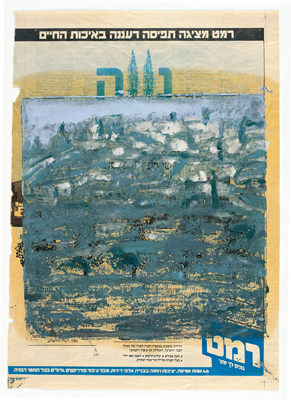
from tsoba, 1993-4
impression on newspaper no.XIV
private collection

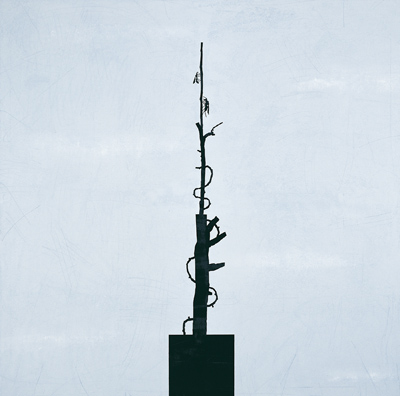
Panic III, 2009
oil on canvas
Collection of Gordon Gallery, Tel Aviv

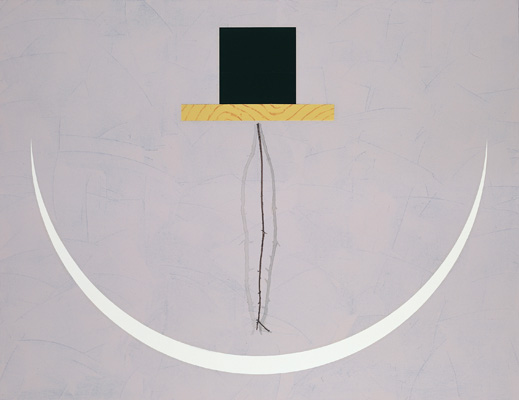
Israel-Palestine I, 2010
oil and acrylic on canvas

== See also ==
Visual arts in Israel
