= Jacob Steinhardt =

Israeli artist

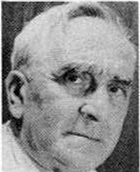
- Steinhardt in 1960 (age 72–73)
- Born: May 24, 1887; Zerkow
- Died: February 11, 1968; Nahariya

Jacob Steinhardt (Hebrew: יעקב שטיינהרדט; 1887–1968) was a German-born Israeli painter and woodcut artist.

== Biography ==
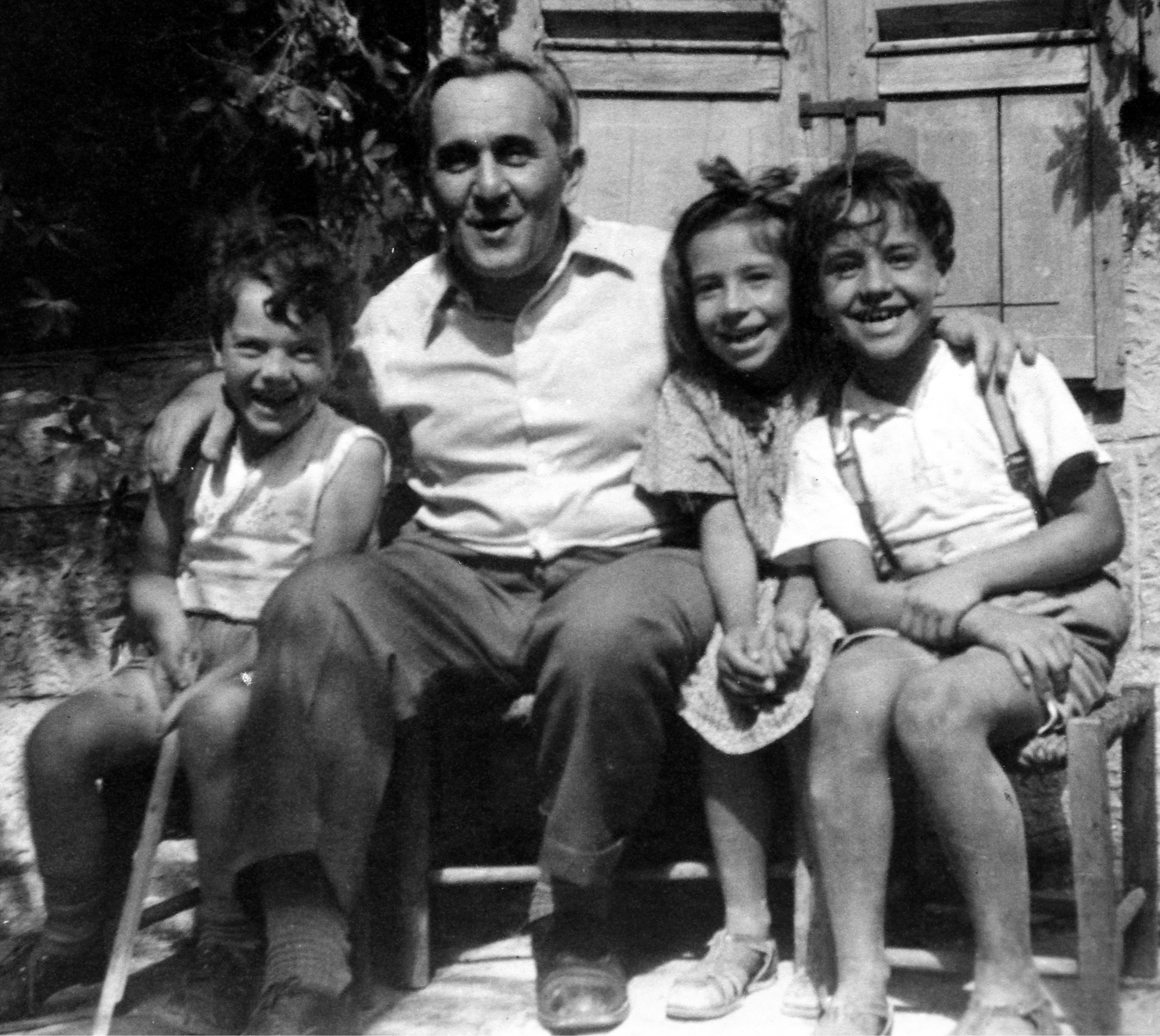
Jacob Steinhardt (age 54–55) with his daughter, Josepha, and the children of a friend, in Jerusalem in 1942. The photograph was taken by a friend of Steinhardt, Josef Tal.

Jacob Steinhardt was born in Zerkow, German Empire (now Żerków, Poland). He attended the School of Art in Berlin in 1906, then studied painting with Lovis Corinth and engraving with Hermann Struck in 1907. From 1908 to 1910, he lived in Paris, where he associated with Henri Matisse and Théophile Steinlen, and in 1911, he was in Italy. When World War I broke out, he enlisted in the German Army, and served on the Eastern Front in Poland and Lithuania, and then in Macedonia. After the war, he returned to Berlin, and in 1922 married Minni Gumpert. They immigrated to Palestine in 1933, after he was harassed by the German police, dominated by the Nazis who had recently come to power.

Steinhardt died in 1968. He is buried in Nahariya.

== Artistic career ==
"Groteske X", a woodcut from 1952. This was part of a series of grotesque woodcuts which he started in 1950.

Jacob Steinhardt worked mainly in woodcuts depicting biblical and Jewish subjects. He participated in the Berlin Secession and founded the Pathetiker Group. He was a member of the Bezalel school group. In 1934, Steinhardt opened an art school in Jerusalem. In 1948, he became Chairman of the Graphics Department at the Bezalel Academy of Art and Design. He served as director of the school during 1954–1957.

== Collections ==
The largest collection of Steinhardt's art is at the Jewish Museum Berlin. A great number of works were donated by his daughter, Josefa Bar-On Steinhardt, and their collection has subsequently been expanded by further purchases. The museum show ran during the winter of 2003–4, for the eightieth birthday of his daughter. The Jewish Museum's collection includes hundreds of prints, drawings and illustrated books, as well as several paintings and unpublished works. It is also possible to find some of his work at the Jewish Museum Frankfurt and at the Jewish Museum of Switzerland in Basel.

== Bibliography ==
- Flisiak, D. (2022). Jakob Steinhardt (1887–1968): Życie i działalność [Jakob Steinhardt (1887–1968): Life and Work]. Chrzan.
