= Kibbutz crisis =

1980s economic crisis in Israel

The Kibbutz crisis (Hebrew: משבר הקיבוצים) was an acute economic crisis experienced by many kibbutzim in Israel during the 1980s, with some still facing challenges today. The crisis began in the early 1980s and worsened after the Israeli economic stabilization program of 1985, during which the inflation rate dropped dramatically. It was characterized by the accumulation of large debts and low returns for the kibbutzim. In addition to the economic hardships, many kibbutzim also faced social and demographic crises.

In 1989 and 1996, the Israeli government, Israeli banks, and kibbutz movements agreed on two debt arrangements to help resolve the economic crisis. The demographic and social crises were significant catalysts for the changes that many kibbutzim have undergone since the 1990s.

While many kibbutzim experienced an economic crisis, a smaller group of kibbutzim managed to avoid it. These kibbutzim largely remained loyal to the traditional values and way of life of the kibbutz. Many of them played a significant role in helping to repay the debts of the economically weaker kibbutzim.

== The historical background of the crisis ==
The kibbutz crisis of the 1980s was not the first financial crisis faced by the kibbutzim. Prior to this, there were several other crises, each followed by debt settlements. The first debt settlement occurred in 1924, and since then, such settlements have taken place roughly once every decade and a half.

In the 1950s Ben-Gurion shifted the place of the kibbutz in the state, by putting pressure on the movement to dedicate their full efforts to the agenda of the state. This shift towards a greater collective than small community opened up the possibility for kibbutz members leaving their communities in favor for higher education, and the capitalist economy that the state was adopting. This led to a deep crisis within the kibbutz movement, and a new department was established in the Ministry of Agriculture with the primary purpose of developing a recovery program for the kibbutzim. In 1958, this department introduced a centralized credit plan, under which each kibbutz was assigned to one of three banks: Bank Hapoalim, Bank Leumi, and the Agriculture Bank. As part of this arrangement, many of the kibbutzim's debts were forgiven, while the remaining debt was restructured. These banks were then responsible for providing the kibbutzim with credit for their development.

Over the years, a consensus developed among the Israeli governments, banks, and the kibbutz movement that the Israeli government was expected to guarantee the kibbutzim's debt and ensure that payments would continue to be made in one way or another. This understanding solidified when the Israeli government had full control over the capital market and allocated credit to selected, favored destinations based on its priorities.

The role of banks in this system was primarily technical: they served as a means for the government to transfer credit without engaging in the financial risk management typically required in a free market system.

In addition to receiving credit from the banks, the kibbutzim also obtained additional credit from kibbutz movement funds and regional and national purchasing organizations. As part of this arrangement, guarantees were established, ensuring that each kibbutz was responsible for the debts of the kibbutz movement funds, and by extension, for the debts of all the kibbutzim. These credit guarantees created a false sense of security within the kibbutzim and the banks, leading them to believe they would be able to overcome any future financial crises.

== Economic background of the crisis ==
In the discussions that emerged following the kibbutz crises, various explanations were proposed. The banks, naturally, along with a significant portion of Israeli society, viewed the conduct of the kibbutzim as the primary cause of the crisis. On the other hand, the kibbutzim tended to place much of the responsibility on the banks and the Israeli government.

The main arguments raised against the kibbutzim focused on the following points:

- Investments made without economic justification: Due to easy access to credit, the kibbutzim invested large sums of money in industry and agriculture, often without economic justification and frequently without adequate financial risk management.
- Inefficient allocation of personnel and capital: It was argued that investments in industry and agriculture were made either to reduce the use of wage workers for ideological reasons or due to the unwillingness of certain kibbutz members to work in specific positions or shifts.
- Borrowing money at fixed interest rates: From the mid-1970s to the mid-1980s, inflation rates skyrocketed, exceeding 100 percent annually for five straight years (including a peak of 450% from 1985 to 1986). During this time, the primary financial instrument used to raise capital was fixed-rate loans, which often had very high nominal interest rates. When inflation subsided, the burden of these loans became overwhelming. The kibbutzim, like other financial businesses, were unable to generate profits at such high inflation rates, leading to an increase in debt due to the loans.
- Making speculative investments in the stock market: Contrary to kibbutz ideology, which emphasized productive work and condemned speculative profits, the kibbutzim—particularly through kibbutz movement funds—engaged in stock market trading and incurred heavy losses during the collapse of bank shares in 1983.

Recent studies by anthropologists in the kibbutzim indicate how social factors contributed to these errors. The main social factor was the lack of effective leadership resulting from the rotation norm encouraged by the kibbutz movement to maintain control. Conservative kibbutz managers, who were loyal to the kibbutz movement but lacked critical thinking skills, were promoted at the end of their short terms. In contrast, managers who were critical thinkers and innovators were often not promoted or left their kibbutzim as a result.

Claims directed at the banks included:

- Reliance on the government to cover the kibbutzim's debt: Despite knowing that the credit given to the kibbutzim was not adequately secured, the banks continued to provide credit based on the assumption that, when necessary, the government would ensure that the debt would be covered.
- Depriving debt calculation: The banks calculated debt estimates in ways that did not comply with the law, leading to massive debt increases from the mid-1980s. This was achieved by employing methods that disadvantaged the debt owners. According to the kibbutzim, the use of these methods, combined with high real interest rates, significantly exacerbated the debt.

It was argued that the inflation-stabilization plan implemented by the government in July 1985 was too drastic, leading to real interest rates of hundreds of percent. This situation particularly affected the agricultural sector, which has long credit needs due to the extended duration of agricultural production processes. Additionally, many investments in agriculture yield profits only years later—such as plantations, cattle and sheep farming, and export-oriented industries encouraged by the government—all of which required substantial credit.

== The development of the crisis during the 1980s ==
In May 1977, the Likud party came to power for the first time in thirty years of Labor rule. The new Prime Minister, Menachem Begin, appointed Simha Erlich as Finance Minister. Erlich introduced economic reforms aimed at shifting the Israeli economy from its socialist characteristics to a more capitalist model. Following these measures, which were not accompanied by reductions in government budgets, inflation surged from 34 percent in 1977 to 131 percent in 1980.

Despite later changes in Finance Ministers and economic programs designed to curb inflation, the crucial step of reducing government budgets was not implemented. As a result, inflation continued to rise, peaking at about 374 percent in 1984. These years were notable for contemporary financial experts, who successfully managed to balance rampant inflation and a gradually strengthening dollar against the pound and the shekel, while profiting from the volatility and uncertainty in the capital markets. Although the kibbutzim, which were aligned with the Israeli Labor Party, lost their political influence when the Likud party came to power, many continued to operate as they had under the Labor Party, maintaining confidence that the government would provide them with a safety net if needed, as it had in the past.

== The debt settlements with the kibbutzim ==
The first debt settlements with the kibbutzim were preceded by attempts to establish plans to address the various financial problems. Initially, these plans were initiated by the kibbutz movement, but later they were developed in conjunction with the Israeli banks. All of these plans ultimately failed. By the end of 1989, after a year of discussions, a settlement was achieved between the kibbutz movement, Israeli banks, and the Ministry of Finance. The main principles of the settlement were:

- The banks would forgive the kibbutzim's debts amounting to 2 billion NIS (at 1993 values).
- An additional 1.3 billion NIS in debt would be forgiven with government funding.
- Raising 1.7 billion NIS to repay the entire kibbutz debt to the banking system.
- Long-term restructuring of 6.7 billion NIS of the debt, with an interest rate of 4.5% per year.
- Cancellation of mutual co-signing among the kibbutzim.
- A reimbursement assessment was established for each kibbutz based on its means of production.
- Establishment of a governing body to monitor the implementation of the settlement, defined as a trustee representing all three parties involved.

In practice, not all debt cancellations originally included in the settlement were carried out. The actual debt interest turned out to be much higher than stipulated, leading to many kibbutzim failing to pay their debts, which continued to grow. At the beginning of the 1990s, new discussions commenced for an additional settlement. Ultimately, it was decided that the "complementary settlement" would begin in 1994, but the agreement itself was signed only in 1996. The main principles of the complementary settlement were:

- The kibbutzim were divided into two groups: "Real Estate Kibbutzim" and "Peripheral Kibbutzim."
- The debts of all the kibbutzim were redefined to be fully paid off within 20 years. The remaining debt for the other kibbutzim was classified as a "bubble."
- The "bubble" debt of the "Peripheral Kibbutzim" was forgiven. It was determined that the "bubble" debt of the "Real Estate Kibbutzim" would be forgiven once their real estate was transferred to the Israel Land Administration, with compensation provided for the land.
- The kibbutzim would transfer 25 percent of their holdings in Tnuva to the state.

Since the signing of the complementary settlement and until the end of 2003, most kibbutzim (out of the 135 originally intended) joined the settlement. The settlement faced considerable criticism within Israeli society. Many argued that it demonstrated the state's preference for a particular sector, while other Israeli businesses that collapsed during those years due to government actions were left without similar support. However, the settlement not only benefited the kibbutzim but also served the interests of the other parties involved. The banks improved their financial situation after receiving government deposits and significantly increased the repayment of kibbutz debt compared to before the complementary settlement. Similar settlements were made with various other institutions in Israel, including factories, business groups, and local authorities.

== The status of kibbutzim today ==
In the discussions leading up to the debt arrangements with the kibbutzim, many kibbutz movement leaders opposed the arrangements, arguing that they would effectively end the kibbutzim. They claimed that the defined repayment capacity was set too high, preventing any new growth for the kibbutzim. To some extent, they were correct, as many kibbutzim that signed the debt arrangements were unable to repay the agreed-upon debt, despite improvements in their business performance in recent years. Additionally, during the 1990s, many kibbutz members, particularly those in leadership roles, decided to leave. They did so because they felt that, under the debt arrangements, the kibbutz was unable to grow and that members' standard of living would be stagnant for the duration of the arrangements (until 2013). The debt arrangements accelerated the brain drain from the kibbutzim, rendering them less innovative and leading to their transformation into economic entities that adopted organizational solutions from a capitalist society, ultimately leading to the dismantling of most kibbutzim.

Some argue that the debt arrangements, which included monitoring and supervising the kibbutzim's conduct by the banks, eventually led to better economic management in most kibbutzim, allowing them to improve their business performance in recent years. Nevertheless, despite this improved performance, most of the collective and collaborative culture in the kibbutzim disappeared. Only a few kibbutzim remained collaborative while also adapting to capitalist arrangements over the years. Since the change was driven by economic and demographic distress, coupled with brain drain and disillusionment with the collaborative past that contributed to the crisis, attempts to rebuild the kibbutzim as collaborative and democratic entities ceased. The prosperous capitalist Israeli economy became the model for the kibbutzim.

Monetary compensation mechanisms were introduced based on members' occupations, which immediately lowered the standard of living for most kibbutz members to that of non-professional or lower-level professional workers, while raising the standard of living for kibbutz managers. Many of these managers, who grew up in the kibbutz and received their education at its expense, now earned salaries comparable to those of private-sector managers, which were 5-10 times higher than those of kibbutz members who financed their own studies. These managers were expected to ensure a fair pension for the veteran kibbutz members. However, most did not adequately compensate the veterans who had contributed to building the kibbutz, and the pensions provided did not meet the minimum standards agreed upon by the kibbutz movement.

In January 2008, the kibbutz movement fulfilled its part of the debt arrangements by transferring 25% of its holdings in Tnuva to the state, a financial value of about $100 million. Meanwhile, new debt arrangements were made with several kibbutzim based on funds they received from the sale, which were allocated to pay off delayed debts to the banking system and the Jewish Agency.

== See also ==
- Shock therapy (economics)
- Washington Consensus
- Balcerowicz Plan
- Supreme Decree 21060
- "Miracle of Chile"
