= Israeli ceramics =

Israeli ceramics are ceramics designed either in Mandatory Palestine or Israel from the beginning of the 20th century. In addition to traditional pottery, in Israel there are artists whose works were created in an industrial environment. Until the late 1970s there existed in Israel a local tradition that emphasized the local values of nature as an expression of Zionist identity. From the 1980s artistic expressions that sought to undercut this tradition began to appear in the works of Israeli artists, who combined ceramics with other artistic media and with personal, critical agendas.

== Beginning of ceramics in the Land of Israel, 1900–1930 ==
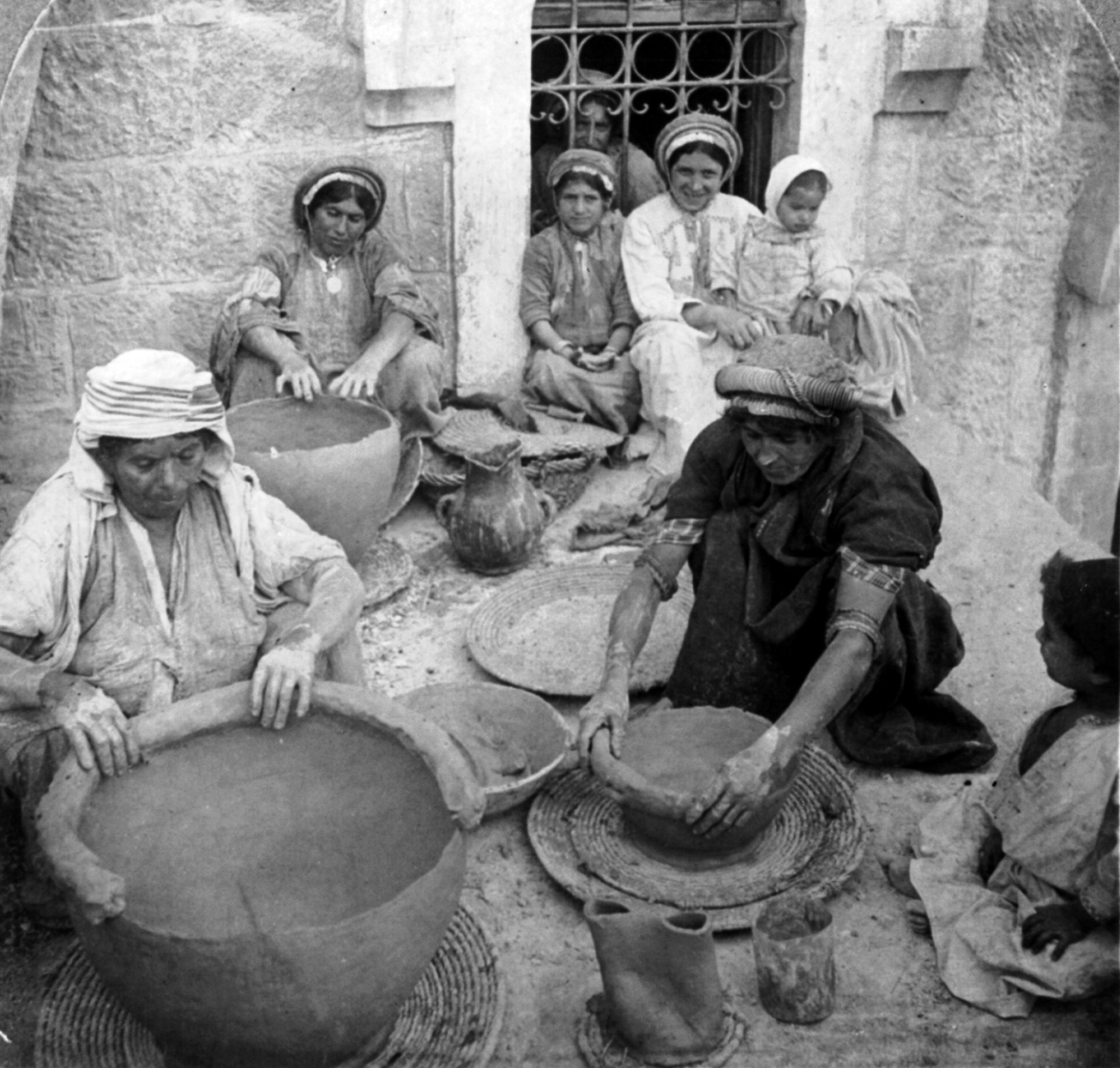
Arab women making clay jars, Ramallah

=== Palestinian ceramics ===
At the beginning of the 20th century the Palestinian tradition of designing pottery from local materials dominated in Israel. The pottery was primary functional, intended primarily for the use of the local population in the Land of Israel. Other vessels were imported from neighboring areas.

Pots were thrown on potter's wheels mostly in urban areas or in pottery villages. It was a craft traditionally worked by men. In the census carried out on the streets of the land of Israel in 1928 during the British Mandate, 77 pottery villages (of individuals or groups) were listed, while in the 1931 census, 211 different pottery villages were listed. Many of the pottery villages were centralized, based on geographical proximity of the potters' families. Examples of this can be found in the pottery workshops held in the pottery villages in Rashia al Fakhar (Tel Faher) at the foot of Mount Hermon. Or in Hebron, at the various workshops of the Alfahori family. These pots were fired at a low temperature in traditional kilns that burned wood, charcoal, or animal droppings. Different workshops were held in Gaza as well, where they produced unique black pottery (فخار اسود), produced by adding organic materials, such as barley husks, to the kiln or by reduction firing. The smoke from the process of the burning of these materials within the kiln lent the pottery its characteristic black color.

In addition, a tradition existed of producing pots made of clay mixed with straw or gravel for cooking and other utilitarian uses by the local population. This work was carried out by hand by women, and the pots were fired in improvised kilns, in kitchen ovens, or sometimes not fired at all. Pottery of this type, which was produced in the Samaria area and in Ramallah, for example, was typically decorated with color made from rusted iron that originated in the Jordan Valley.

As the century progressed, this tradition began dying out as a result of industrialization, and in addition, from the 1980s competing pottery from other countries began to be imported. Until 1989, for example, 11 different workshops were active in Hebron. However, by 2007 there remained only 8 potters there. In 1983 The Eretz Israel Museum mounted an exhibition displaying the pottery of the Lebanese village of Rashia al Fakhar.

=== Armenian ceramic art ===
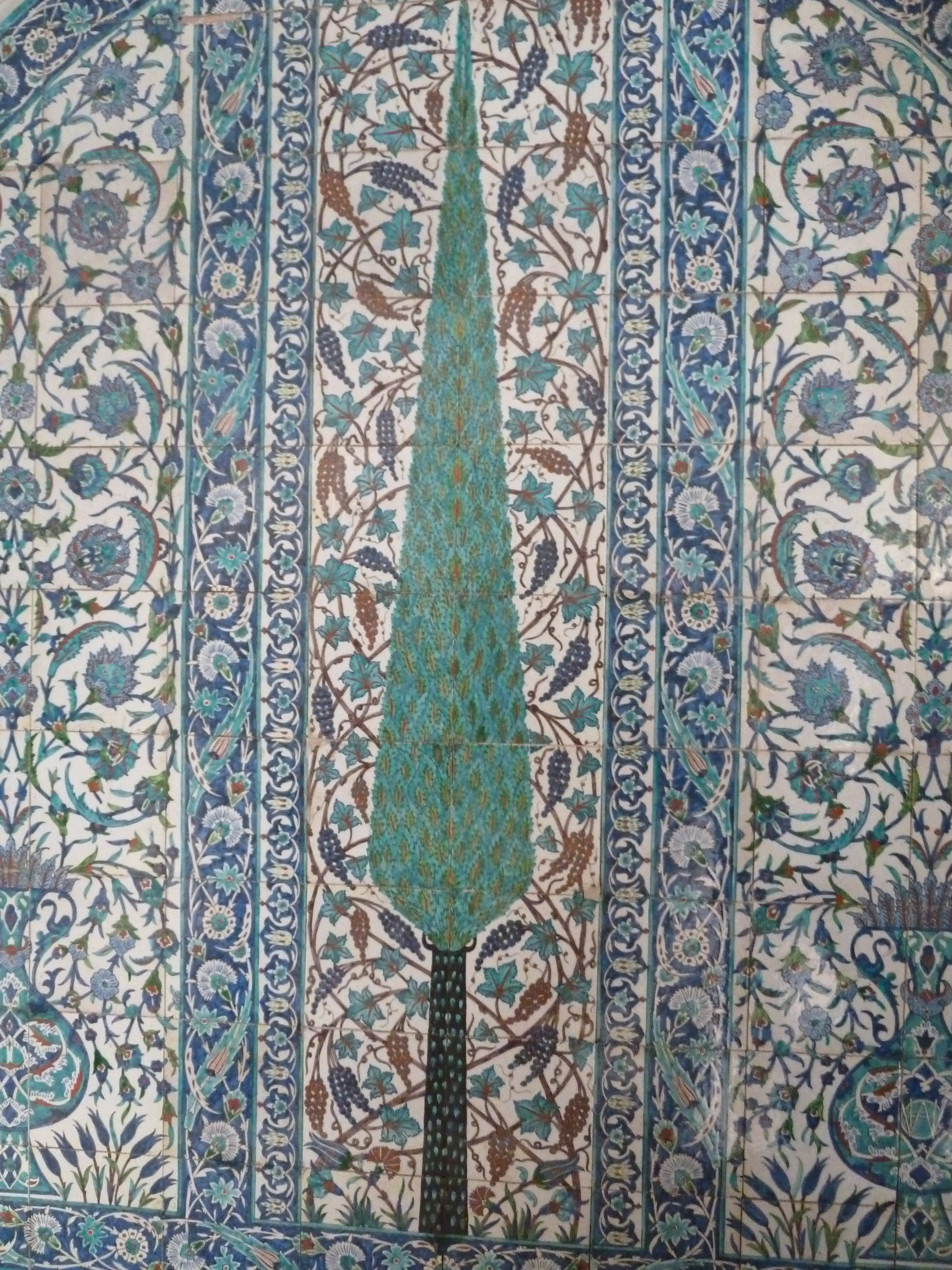
Armenian Ceramics at the Jerusalem House of Quality (Saint John Eye Hospital Group), Jerusalem

At the end of 1918, members of the British Military Administration and the Pro-Jerusalem Society invited David Ohannessian, a master Armenian ceramicist from Ottoman Kütahya and a survivor of the Armenian Genocide who was living as a refugee in Aleppo, to travel to Jerusalem to renovate the ceramic tiles of the Dome of the Rock. In the late summer of 1919, Ohannessian returned to Kütahya, under the protection of the British Military Administration, to obtain the necessary raw materials and recruit remaining Armenian ceramicists to return to Jerusalem with him and participate in his workshop. This first Armenian atelier was supported, in part, by the British interest in traditional arts in the context of the Arts and Crafts movement. Armenian ceramic art can be traced back to the 15th century, to the Ottoman Anatolian cities of İznik and Kütahya, but the combination of the ancient art of the Land of Israel and Christian motifs created a unique artistic synthesis.

David Ohannessian opened a workshop that also produced utilitarian and decorative pottery. He created tiles for the American Colony Hotel (1923), the fountain house in St. John's Hospital, the tiled dome in the Rockefeller Museum garden, etc. Motifs in his work are Cypresses trees, tulips and grapevines typical of traditional Seljuk and Ottoman decorative art. He also used figures derived from Armenian medieval illuminations, designs from European renaissance majolica, and bird motifs based on an Armenian 5th-6th century mosaic floor, discovered during an archeological dig in Jerusalem during the 1890s.

The workshop that Ohannessian founded in Jerusalem followed the tradition of ceramic making as he had practiced and overseen it in his atelier in Kütahya, in Ottoman Anatolia, which had flourished prior to World War I and his deportation to the Syria. According to traditional methods, the processes of clay and glaze mixing, wheel throwing, design, painting, and firing were performed by a variety of artisans, all supervised by Ohannessian, some of whom specialized in design and others who were experts at the potter's wheel. Ohannessian was skilled himself in all facets of the art and trained a variety of apprentices, as he had done in Anatolia. He maintained particular expertise in painting ceramics and design. Upon the founding of his workshop on the Via Dolorosa, he cooperated with Near East Relief, to train a number of Armenian orphans of the genocide, giving them the skills to engage in the art on a professional basis. Some of his workshop's output, especially the monumental architectural tile works, were signed by the chief artist. Numerous other vases and plates identified their respective makers through small glazed initials on the bottom, usually painted in ochre. Ohannessian's workshop used a stone wood-burning kiln, built to his specifications in 1919. The model implemented in this workshop was used for other Armenian workshops founded subsequently in Jerusalem.

The artists Megardish Karakashian and Nishan Balian, who left Ohannessian's workshop in 1922, founded a workshop together called "Palestine Pottery," where they developed a line of design with figurative images that were alien to traditional Turkish ceramic art (with the exception of Kütahya's own figurative tradition, as practiced by its Armenian ceramicists).. For example, the two of them combined designs from ancient mosaics discovered in the Land of Israel, such as the "Birds Mosaic" (Jerusalem) or the mosaic from Hisham's Palace in Jericho. Often these images were imbued with Christian theological interpretations. The joint workshop functioned continually until 1964, when Stefan Karakashian and Marie Balian, heirs of the founders, founded two separate workshops that made use of images from the past as well as new images that they created.

=== The ceramics of Bezalel ===
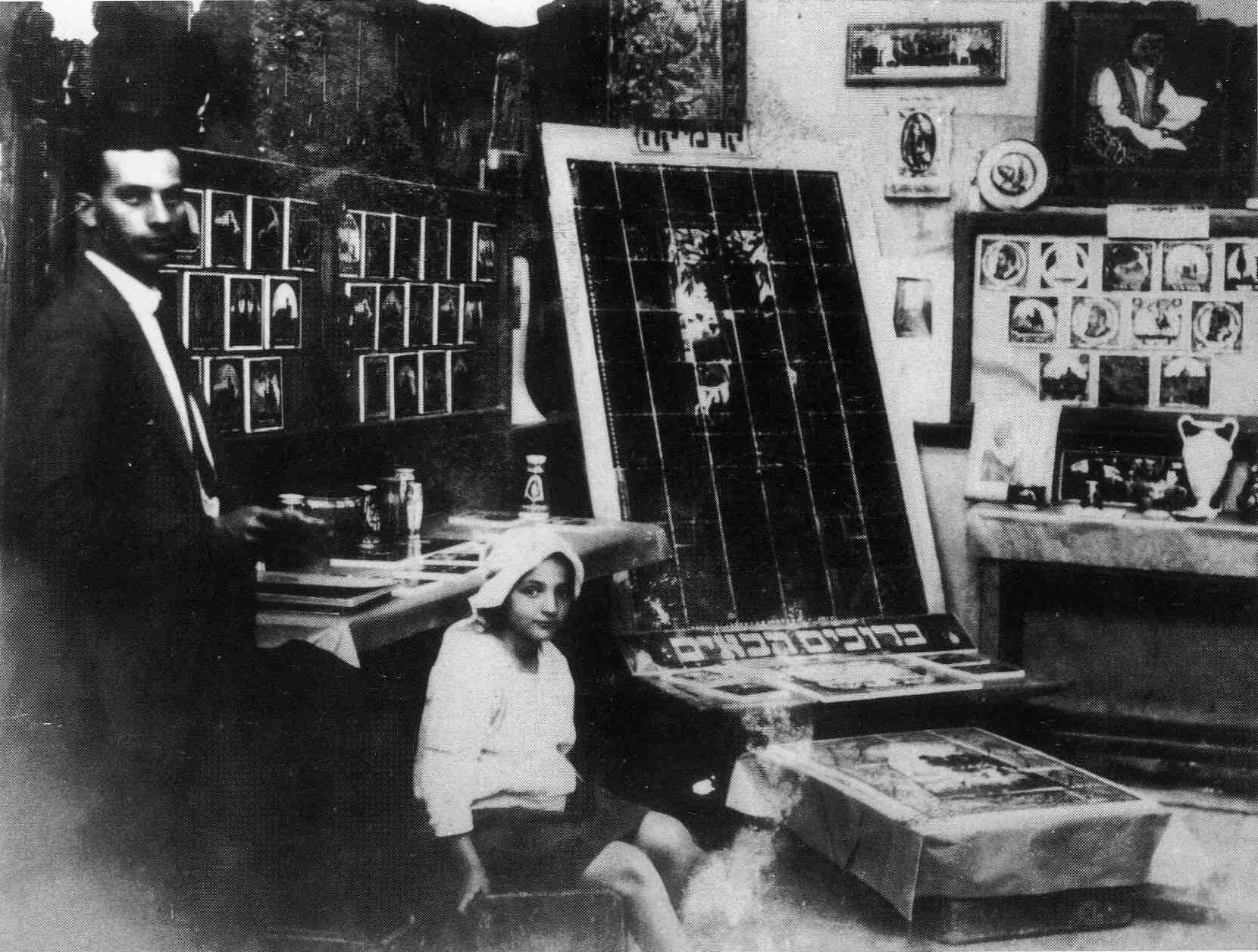
Tiles and ornamental vessels, plaques and decorations for house facades, produced at the workshop. standing left – Y. Eisenberg; seated: Zahara Schatz. mid-twenties. Jerusalem city archives.

Within the framework of the "Bezalel School of Art and Craft", a ceramics studio was founded in 1924, with Jacob Eisenberg at its head. By 1917 Boris Schatz was considering opening a department for the design of cast decorative items, as well as a department of painting on "porcelain." This craft was already being taught at Bezalel using ready-made porcelain brought in from outside Palestine for use at Bezalel. Schatz saw in the activity of the factory for bricks and roofing tiles that operated on the grounds of the "Schneller Orphanage" in Jerusalem from approximately 1895, proof of the practicality of such a local industry, which would make use of local materials brought from Motza.

Eisenberg, who was a student at Bezalel from 1913 to 1919, after his graduation went to study in Vienna, at the School for Arts and Crafts, where he took a continuing education course in ceramic design and production. The department separated the design of the ceramics, mostly taught by Bezalel instructors and particularly by Ze'ev Raban, from the practical production of the pieces. Of the objects produced in this department, the best known are the wall tiles and decorations from the 1920s and 1930s. These works include the tiles on the walls of the Ahad HaAm School, the Bialik House, and the Lederberg House in Tel Aviv, and in the synagogue of Moshav Zekanim.

The style of tile design was influenced by Art Art Nouveau and by the "Jugendstil style. This style is expressed in the flatness of the area described and in the richly decorated borders. With regard to ideas, "Bezalel tiles" expressed a tendency toward transcendentalism, seen in their borders cast with images taken from Jewish tradition and Zionist content.

== Beginning of Hebrew ceramics, 1932–1950 ==
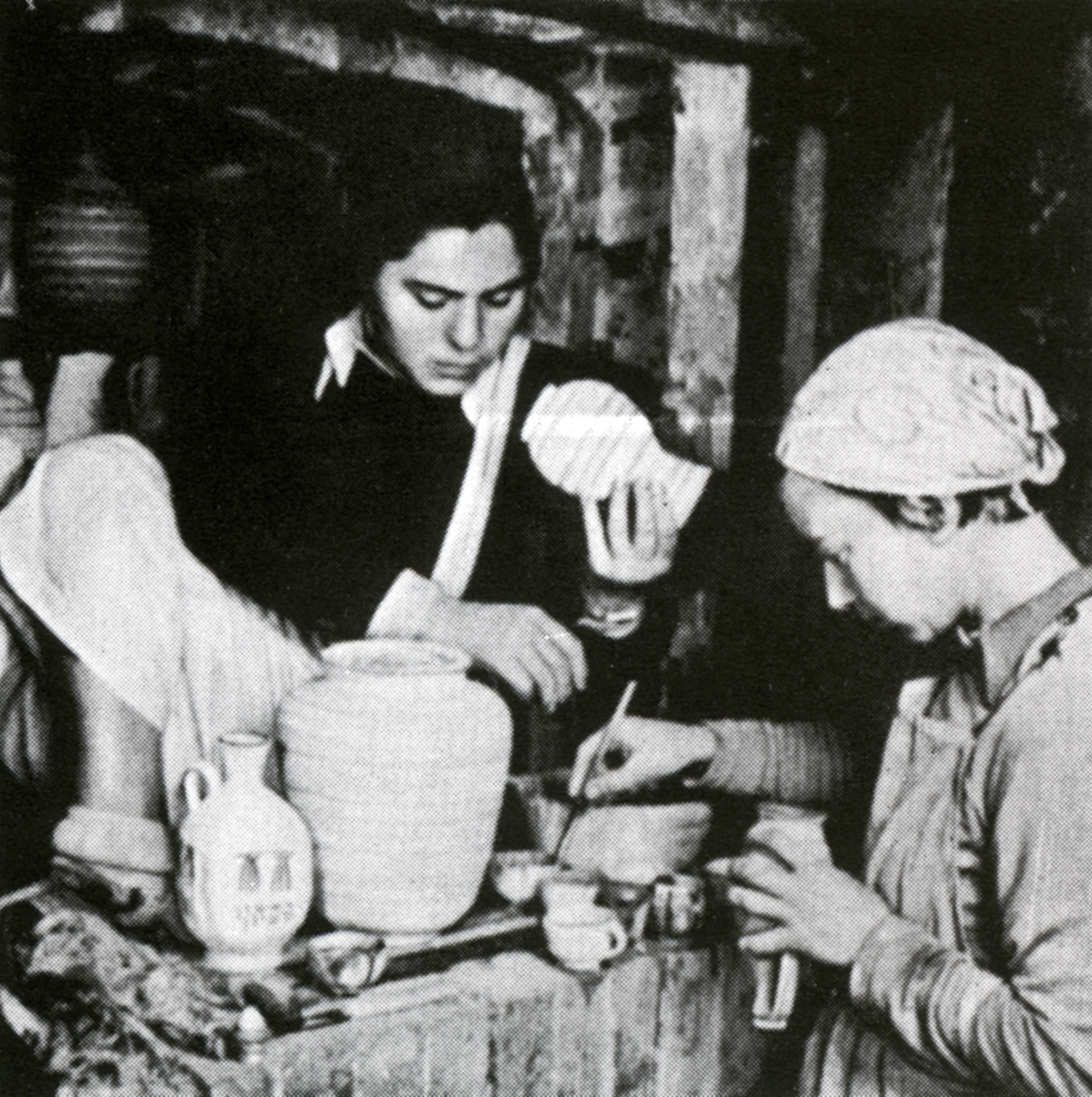
Mira libes (left) and Chava Samuel (right) next to the kiln, Rishon LeZion

In her article "Techno Tools: The Logical Ones" (2011), Shlomit Bauman maintained that contemporary Israeli ceramics is characterized by a disconnect from the Palestinian tradition and by "a lack of a local ceramics industry that would permit a dialog of understanding between local ceramic artists."

At the same time as the Armenians and the Arabs living in the Palestine worked within independent traditions, Jewish artists had to create a synthesis between European art and art in the Land of Israel under the conditions that existed there in the early 20th century. This can be seen both in the design of the models and in the work techniques, which tended to be mechanized. In addition, while local pottery depended on family-led workshops and on cooperative activity by the artists, the Jewish potter saw himself both as an artist and as an expression of the language of art.

Chava Samuel, who Immigrated to the Palestine in 1932, founded "Hayozer" [The Creator], the first ceramics workshop in the Jewish community in Jerusalem. "Kad VeSefel" [Jug and Cup], the ceramics workshop founded in 1934 in Rishon LeZion with Paula Ahronson, produced a variety of utilitarian pots and decorative pottery, using a combination of potter's wheel and ceramic casting. The style of the pots was, for the most part functional, influenced both by the spirit of modernism and the European Bauhaus style. Mira Libes, a pupil in the workshop of Samuel and Ahronson, described the pottery produced in the workshop as the direct result of "create pottery that is simple, functional, and beautiful," a philosophy intended also to improve public taste, which was deemed at that time indescribably bad. The pottery produced was generally influenced by the "Bauhaus" style, which Paula had studied, and the simple and beautiful decorative-colorful style of Eva."[18]

The motifs of the decorations on Samuel's pottery were also influenced by the archeology of the Land of Israel, as well as by Oriental art, under whose influence she produced "Eastern" images and images from the Jewish world. As opposed to the figures from the Jewish world created by the artists of the "Bezalel" school, Samuel's imaged lacked the religious dimension. The images that remained, for the most part looked like images from folklore. The decorative style of Samuel's pottery focused on individual images, drawn primarily freehand and glazed.

In contrast to the pottery of Samuel and Ahronson, the works of Hedwig Grossman displayed an attempt to formulate a Land of Israel "localness" in their ceramic design. Grossman made Aliyah to the Land of Israel in 1933 after studying pottery in Germany. During her first years in Palestine, Grossman already began to carry out soil surveys to determine how local materials were used in pottery production. In addition, Grossman researched how pottery was made in the Land of Israel in ancient times and what where the work methods of Arab and Armenian potters throughout the Land. In her work Grossman emphasized the use of materials from the Land of Israel. Some of her work was even influenced by local archaeological findings. Her techniques for working the material included basic geometric decoration, using local non-glaze slips (engobes) in assorted colors.

An echo of Grossman's views can be seen in the 1940s, when Jacob Lev, who served from 1939 as the head of the Sculpture Department in the "New Bezalel," began to offer classes in pottery in the department. Most of the pots that were made in this institution were not fired in a kiln and so did not survive, but in his article "The Pretty Pot" (1941), he emphasizes the modernist approach to design of the pot and the relationship between its parts in the "Bauhaus" spirit. However photographs of the pots show the influence of the architecture of the Land of Israel in the choice of the types of pots, as well as in the avoidance of decoration in the rough texture of their design.

The works of Hedwig Harag Zunz, who arrived in the Land of Israel at the beginning of the 1940s, also represent an attempt at creating pottery with a Land of Israel "localness." In Zunz's works this was expressed primarily in her choice of local materials. Most of her work was produced using a potter's wheel, but she also created pottery with an architectural bent. In spite of her consistent use of local materials, Zunz's works differ from the archaeological direction of Hedwig Grossman's works or the oriental decoration of Eva Samuel's. The shape of her pottery was influenced by European Modernism in its lack of decoration and in its organic tendency toward the use of the glossy surface slips of Terra sigillata or ceramic glazes. In addition to her independent works, Harag Zunz also produced technical academic research and participated in various industrial projects.

== From landscape to clay, 1950–1980 ==
In the 1950s and 1960s there was an upswing in ceramic activity in Israel, and steps were taken toward institutionalizing ceramics as a branch of art. Alongside traditional pottery and the newly established "Studio Pottery", other forms of media began to develop, including ceramic sculpture and industrial initiatives, a small-scale industry that took its spiritual roots from European Modernism. In general, ceramic artists, like many other Israeli artists, strove toward "localness", with its identification with the land, the landscape, and the archaeology of the Land of Israel.

=== Industrialization ===
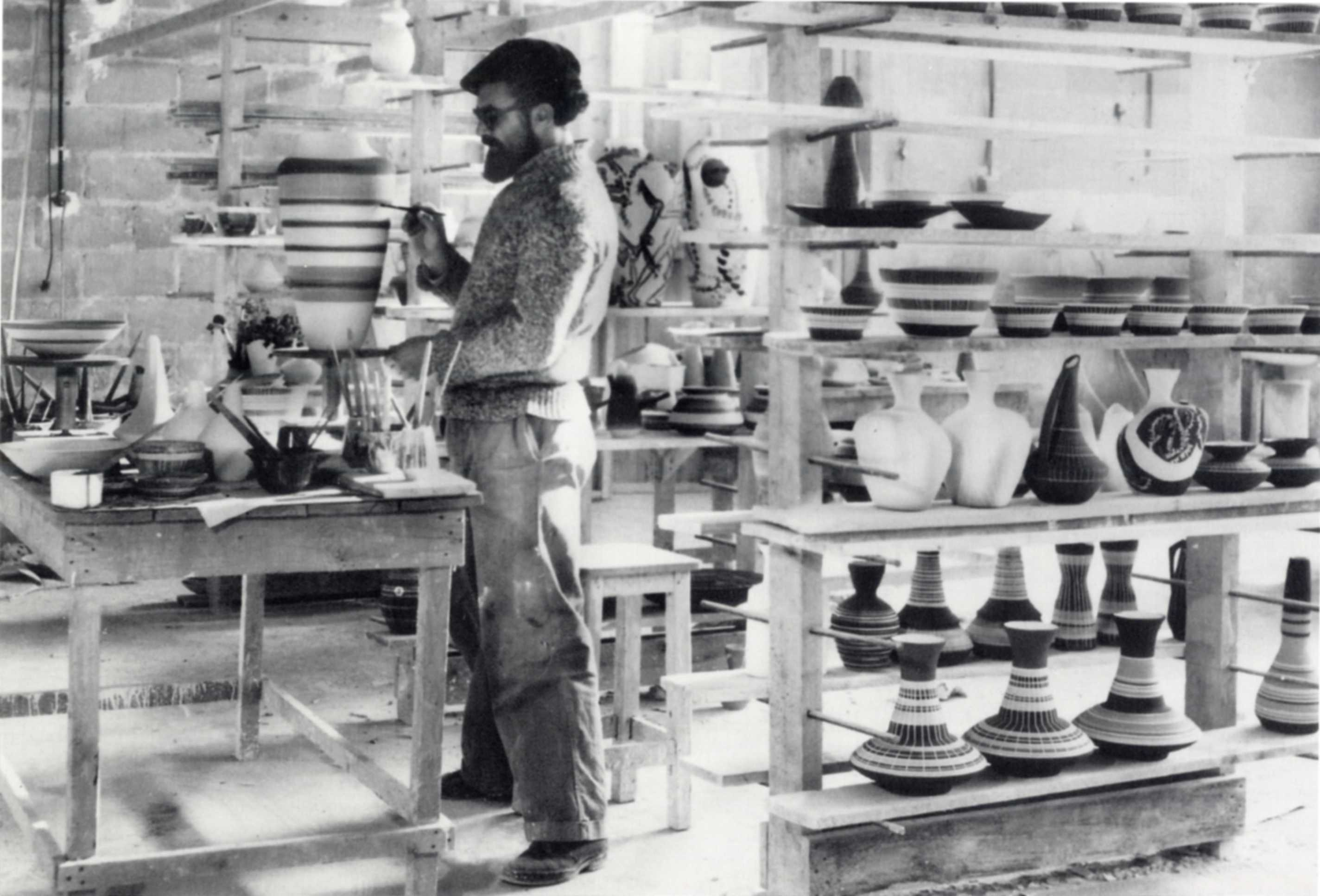
Nehemia Azaz at Harsa Ceramics

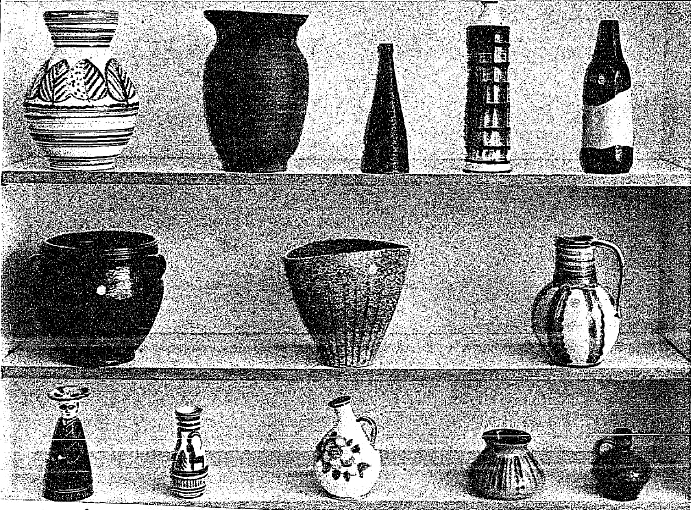
Vases from Lapid and Harsa Ceramics, Davar, 23 October 1959

From the very beginning of the ceramics industry in Israel, ceramic objects were produced in casting molds. However, the development of the Zionist industry gave impetus to speedy industrialization.[24] The main area in which the ceramics industry developed was Haifa, where in 1938 "Naaman" where cast porcelain objects were produced, was founded.[25] In the exhibition "Applied Art and the Prescription for Industry in the Land of Israel," held in the Bezalel Museum in Jerusalem in 1947, glazed pots were displayed by Hanna Harag Zunz as an example of cooperation among various elements of the industry.[26] In 1955 in the Haifa Museum of Art an exhibition entitled "The Ceramic Society" was mounted, in which objects and the processes of their production in the local ceramics industry were displayed.

The 1950s saw the beginning of practical cooperation between the ceramics industry and the designers and artists in the young state, with an eye to advancing the industry and raising its prestige. Similar initiatives took place in the 1960s in Israel Ceramic and Silicate Institute in the Technion, and in Bezalel, where they began testing ceramic materials for design.

Aharon Kahana - who with his wife founded "Beit Hayotzer" [Artisan's Workshop] (Haifa), which was so large he employed three assistant potters—succeeded in defining a widespread style that combined modernist abstraction with decorative folk motifs. This combination succeeded in "returning art to the people." and "making use of many shapes, which had been unacceptable in the eyes of the viewers, as decoration for ceramic creations.

Among the better known ceramic production plants were "Kol-Keramic" (Haifa), "Carnet" (Netanya Ceramics),"Ceramit" (Netanya) "Beit Halachmi" (Tel Aviv), "Bror Hayil (Bror Hayil), "Keramaklin" (Nes Tziona), "Palkeramic" (Haifa), and "Beit Hayotzer" (Ramat Gan/Petah Tikva), the ceramics workshop of Kfar Menachem, etc. At the same time, the two most important factories were "Lapid Pottery" (1951) and "Harsa Ceramics (1956)," which combined technology with handmade techniques.

In 1952 Elisabeth Cohen came to work as a designer for Lapid Pottery. Elisabeth Cohen had studied with Hedwig Grossman and founded the "art" department in the company. By 1959 this department employed 20 people. In the beginning the company produced utilitarian pots cast from the materials used to cast toilets, but little by little both the methods and the designs of the company became more sophisticated. In addition to Cohen other designers, including Maud Friedland, came to work for the company. Another art department produced ceramics in the Harsa Ceramics company from 1956 to 1966. The department was founded by Nehemia Azaz, who designed his pots using local colors and materials. At its peak, the department employed 30 workers. After Azaz left the department, it was run by Pnina Zamir Amir.

The articles made in both companies were modernist in style and were characterized by the use of geometric styles and primarily abstract decoration. These designs were influenced by the tradition of modernist design, from designs created in Europe during this same period, and therefore by what was perceived as the expression of Land of Israel "localness." Azaz, for example, stated that his forms were influenced by the desert landscape.

The use of porcelain by ceramics companies was concentrated for the most part in the "Naaman" and "Lapid" factories, both of which produced primarily utilitarian utensils. At the same time it is known that the industry tried to encourage local design. Shimon Badar, for example, who was the first designer for "Naaman," also served as a lecturer on ceramic technology at the Ceramic Department of Bezalel. An example of a large scale technological–artistic project is the covering of the entrance to Asia House (1977-1979) in tiles produced in the porcelain molds next to "Naaman" and designed by the artist Pinchas Eshet.

=== Studio pottery ===
The 1950s and 1960s were the most important years of ceramic activity in the field of Israeli art. For the first time ceramic artists began to be trained in many private workshops and a variety of academic institutions. In addition, decorative arts –including ceramic art – were no longer perceived as a foreign element in the young Israeli culture. To a large extent these forms of media were encouraged by various government agencies. Finally, an examination of the creations of the artists demonstrates the inculcation of a local artistic "tradition" that chose to cut itself off from the Arab ceramic tradition, the Armenian tradition, and even that of Bezalel, in favor of "modernism" and "localness," which determined the central direction of Israeli ceramics until the 1980s.

Along with Hedwig Grossman, who taught most young ceramicists in her Jerusalem studio and in Ein Hod, and from 1964 in Givatayim, Hanna Harag Zunz also taught them in the Oranim Seminar (today Oranim Academic College), Paula Ahronson at Wizo in Tel Aviv, and Gedula Ogen at Havat HaNoar HaTzioni (Israel Goldstein Youth Village). In 1957 the department of ceramics at The Arts Institute at Tel-Hai College opened. In 1958 the Department of Ceramics and Glass Design at Bezalel Academy of Arts and Design was founded, next to the Schneller Orphanage. The department was headed by David Wachtel, who had worked previously at the "Palkeramics" factory. His teaching faculty included David Calderon, Pnina Amir-Zamir, and Maud Friedland. In 1962 Gedula Ogen was appointed head of the department. Between 1961 and 1963 the number of students in the department grew from 26 to 50, and the amount of work space in the department greatly increased.[38] Another teaching institution was the "Visual Arts Center" in Beersheba.

From the standpoint of design, the ceramicists continued the tradition of Harag Zunz and particularly the tradition of Grossman, in everything connected to the spirit of European Modernism and in the aspiration toward the expression of what was local in their works. Among the most significant followers of Grossman are Amnon Israeli and Gedula Ogen. From the 1960s both of them took the inspiration for their work from archaeology and the Land of Israel landscape, expressed in works that were unglazed and coated in slip or exposed to an open fire during their firing. Other prominent ceramic artists were Yehudit Meir and Yocheved Marx, who worked together in Beersheba from 1958, using local materials from the earth of the Negev and fired their works at very high temperatures (1250-1300 degrees C), which was atypical for Israeli ceramicists of that period. The works they created spanned the field from decorative to practical.

The opportunities for exhibiting and selling ceramics during that period were limited and led to the production, for the most part, of practical ceramic ware. Along with exhibitions at "Mikra-Studio" gallery (Tel Aviv, 1946–1956), which combined emphasizing artistic values with exhibiting female ceramic artists, and "Atelier 97" (Tel Aviv), ceramics were sold at the Maskit stores (Tel Aviv, 1959- ?), which emphasized folkloristic elements. In addition there were a number of exhibitions of ceramic art at the Tel Aviv Museum of Art and at the Bezalel Museum and at a variety of private stores. The overwhelming majority of ceramic artists were not members of a professional artists' union, and if they were, like Grossman and Samuel, within that framework they exhibited primarily paintings and prints. In 1966 in Tel Aviv the "Clay Museum" opened as part of the Eretz Israel Museum, exhibiting ancient ceramics next to exhibitions of Israeli artists who exhibited in the open courtyard of the pavilion. In 1968 the Ceramic Artists Association of Israel was founded, headed by Joseph Blumenthal.

In 1963 the book Art in Israel was published, under the editorship of Benjamin Tammuz. The book devoted an entire chapter to art that John Cheney compiled. In this chapter, which was accompanied by a number of photographs, Cheney surveyed such areas of art as design, jewelry making, and ceramics, which he juxtaposed to media such as drawing, sculpture, and architecture. The presentation of ceramics and the rest of the arts as equal to other artistic media, bears witness to the importance of art during those years and its promotion by exhibitions and competitions organized by institutions such as the Israel Packaging Institute and the Israel Export Institution, etc. On 24 September 1970, an exhibition opened in the Tel Aviv Museum of Art that surveyed the field of ceramics in Israel and was the ultimate expression of this trend. The exhibition – "Israel Ceramics 70" – displayed 284 works of 64 artists, along with a detailed catalog that included photographs of the works as well. In addition the works produced by another five factories ("Beit Hayotser," "Lapid," "Naaman," "Palkeramic," and "Carnet."

=== The Ein Hod school ===
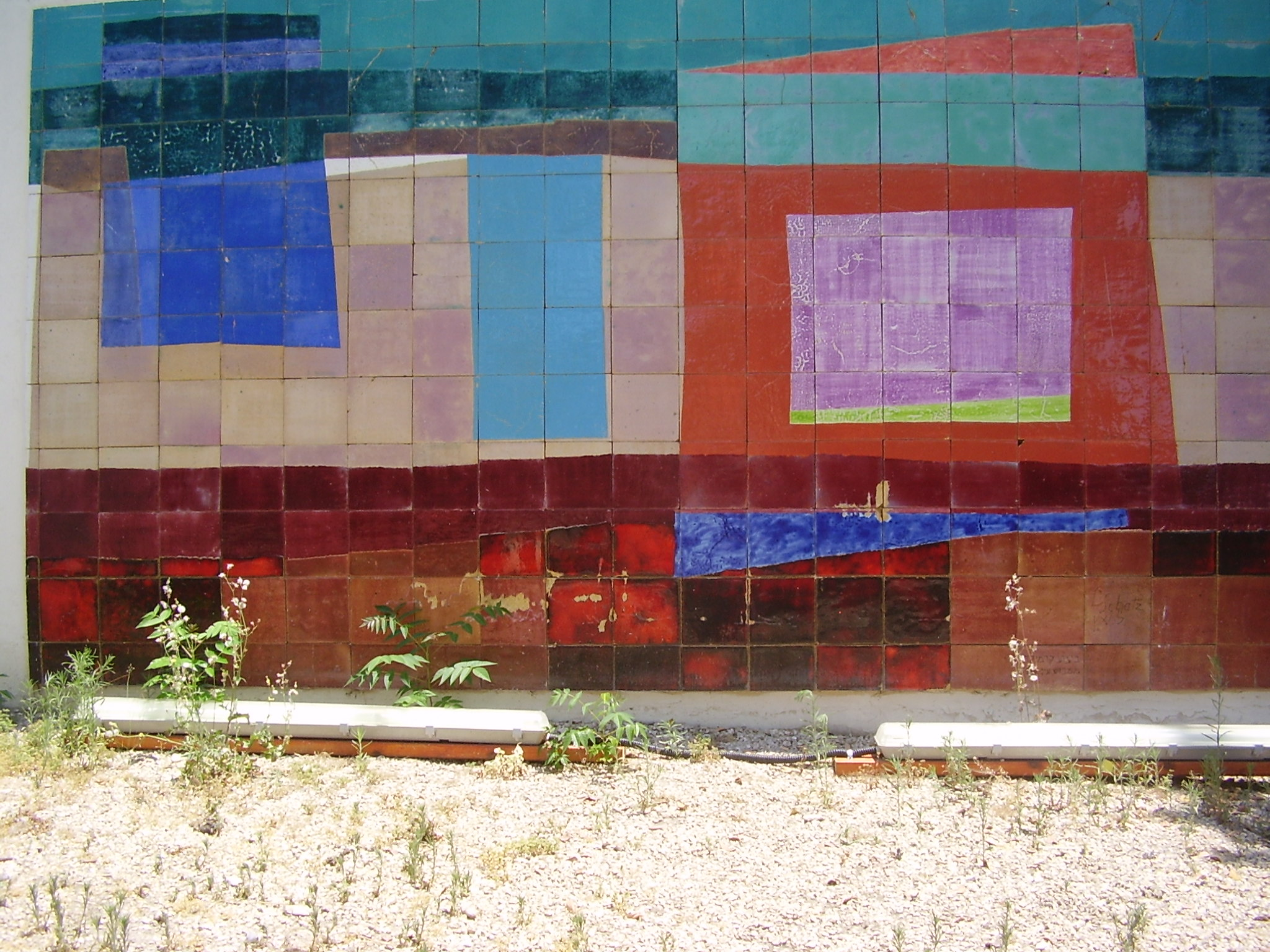
Ceramic wall by Louise Schatz, Ein Hod

In 1957, in close proximity to one another, Itche Mambush and his wife Aviva Margalit opened pottery workshops in Ein Hod Artists Village. The village was founded in 1953 by Marcel Janco, as a village for the arts and artists. Around the workshops a group of resident artists and artists who lived nearby began to add ceramics to one of the media in which they worked. Some of these artists were identified with "New Horizons," that is, Janco, Yehezkel Streichman, Pinchas Abramovich, and Aharon Kahana, who worked alongside artists for whom the decorative style was an integral part of their art, such as Louise Schatz, Bezalel Schatz, Jean David, Genia Berger, etc.

In their works we see a colorful, expressive approach with an emphasis on glazes not typical of the "material" tradition in local ceramics. In addition to a small amount of ceramic sculpture, these artists produced many paintings using glazing techniques, and murals using a variety of glazed ceramic tiles. Some of the artists worked the materials themselves, while others produced detailed sketches for items to be implemented in different workshops, such as the ones in Ein Hod or the one in Kfar Menachem.

These decorative walls were part of the trend towards combining art with local architecture, and were used by other artists along with other techniques such as sgrafitto and mosaics. One of the best known artistic event in this field took place in 1954, when a group of ceramic wall paintings by Aharon Kahana, Jean David, and Gedula Ogen were put in place on the Givat Ram campus of The Hebrew University of Jerusalem. In 1958 sketches of these walls were even presented in the exhibition "Ten Years of Architecture in Israel" in the Tel Aviv Museum. The peak of this creativity was in 1966, when an international hands-on seminar in ceramics took place in Ein Hod, at Berger's initiative.

=== From pottery to ceramic sculpture ===
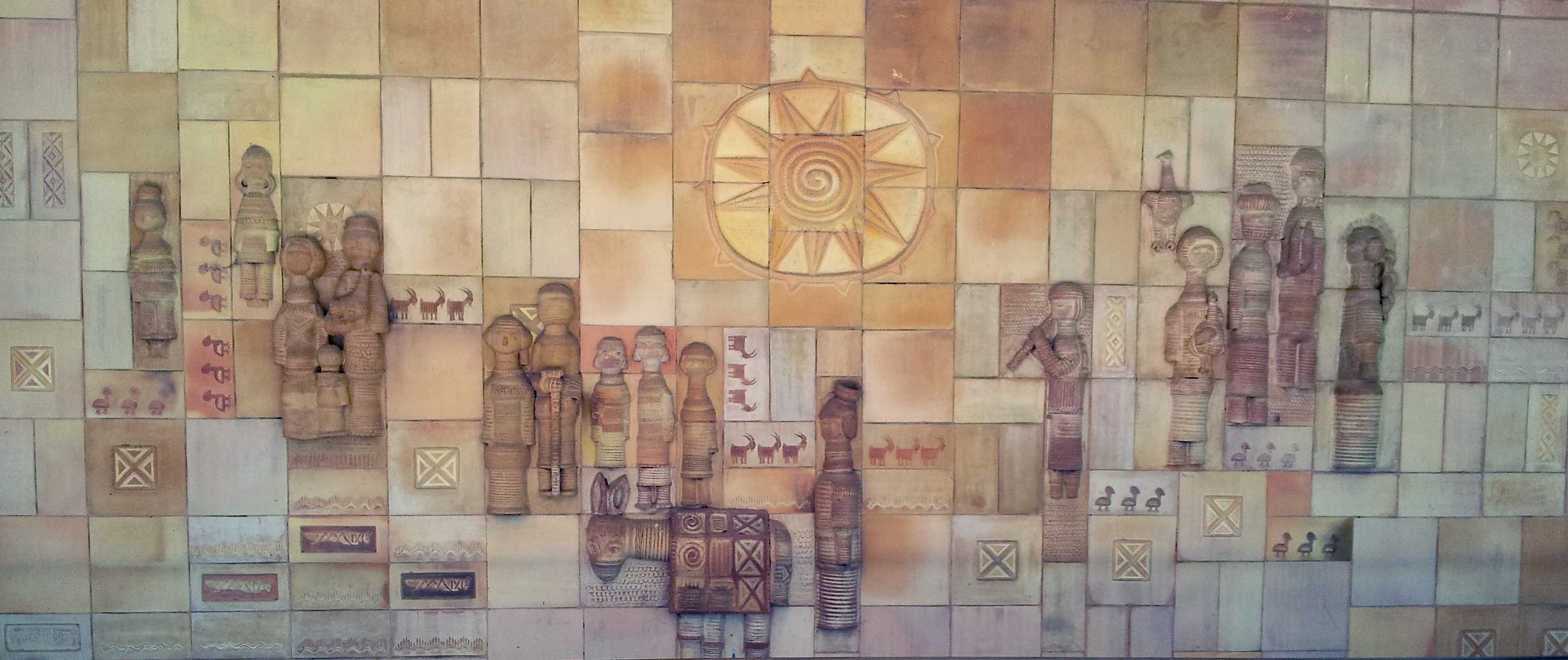
The Gathering of Israel (1963) by Gedula Ogen

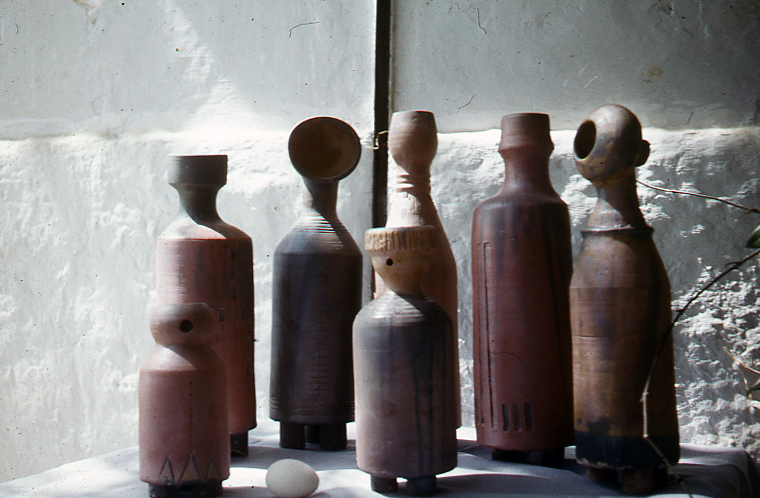
Untitled (1963-5) by Nora and Naomi

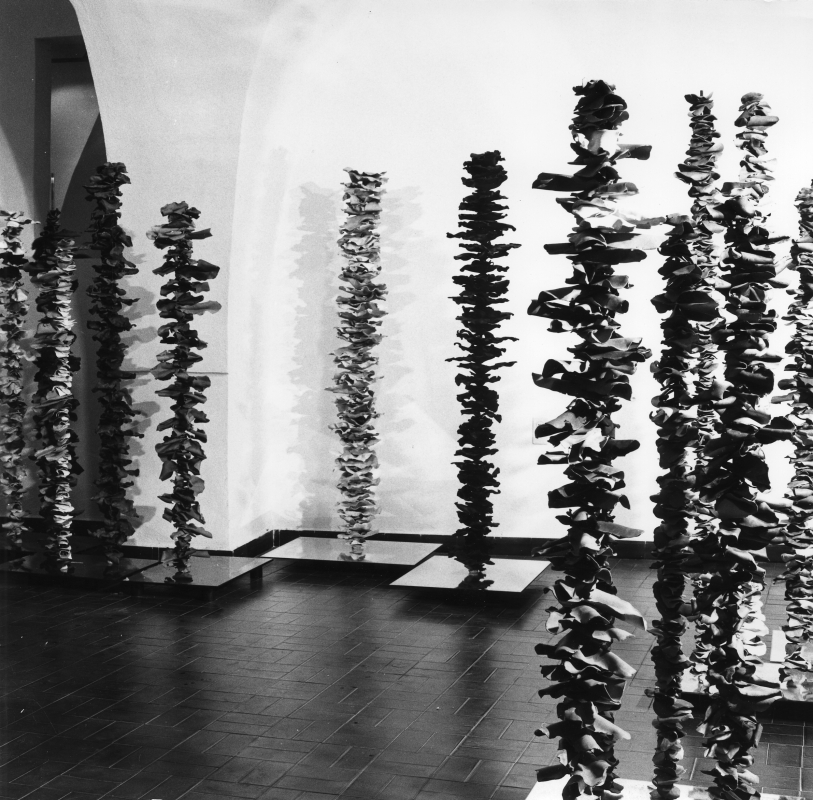
Tobacco leaves (1977) by Shelly Harari

In the second half of the 1960s the influence of different kinds of media began to appear in the works of Israeli ceramicists. In particular the influence of Israeli sculptors could be seen. Along with the continuing use of "architectural" images and the trend toward "localness," it could be seen in the use of images of the land and desert landscapes, a divergence from the boundaries of traditional ceramics. The aspiration toward copying nature into works of art forced the artists into seeking new artistic expressions.

The status of Land of Israel architecture as the expression of Zionist nationalism attracted not only the broad public, but also many ceramicists, to it. Many of them utilized the skills they had acquired in the restoration of pottery, which was found in great numbers in the archeological digs of the 1950s. It was natural, therefore, that architectural images appeared in the works of Israeli artists. A whole group of artists such as David Ben Shaul, Agi Yoeli, David Calderon, Moshe Shek, and Shelly Harari, in addition to their ceramic works, produced during this period human sculptures or animal images inspired by figurines and statuettes from antiquity. Their works included a pioneering Zionist element that expressed an attempt to connect the young Israeli state with its historical and biblical past. At the same time, Israeli ceramicists showed a tendency toward modernism, which emphasized the geometric character of the shape and the work and showed the influence of European modernism.

Most of the characteristics of sculpture can be found in works that originated on potter's wheels during those years. A central element in the widespread distribution of works of this genre was the teaching of Gedula Ogen at Bezalel. Ogen developed a style using the potter's wheel to achieve the volume needed for large scale relief sculpture and figurative sculpture. In her works she continued Grossman's style of design in her emphasis on the naturally colorful quality of the material. Most of her work dealt with images from nature and with the relationship between it and culture and art.

The main reason for the shift in style during the 1960s that deviated from the previous tradition by opening the field of Israeli ceramics to varied new points of view, was the arrival and influence of ceramics producers and professional ceramic artists, the practical implementation of which could be seen in the works of David Morris, Magdalena Hefetz, Sonia Natra and others who studied and became specialists in the United States and Europe.

An article from 1972 describes the creation of one of these sculptures by Rina Peleg, a graduate of Bezalel, who "leaning heavily on the potter's wheel and round motions, creates the body of her sculpture. Only after this does she knead and shape the finished form with her hands, creating its decoration and ornamentation." However she soon began to request that the artists "jettison the jug" and the decorative dimension of traditional ceramics in favor of freestanding art. Artists such as Neta Avraham, Shelly Harari, Nora and Naomi, Jean Meir, Maud Friedland, and others, deviated from the tradition of "sculpting with the potter's wheel" in order to try out different techniques, particularly freestanding sculpture. A central motif was the imitation of formations found in local landscapes and their conversion into objects of sculpture.

The Israeli landscape, especially the desert landscape, was perceived as isolated from modern westernized society, and served as an inspiration to artists in creating the form, texture, and color of artistic objects. In this way these artists joined the general trend among many other Israeli artists who created in their works images of an archaic utopia, many of them even under the late influence of "Canaanite" art. The objects they created tended towards abstract plant structures or towards the building of objects that suggested archaic cultural structures.

As ceramics drew closer to the field of art, however, foreign influences also creeped into the Israeli tradition. Siona Shimshi, for example, during these years returned from studies in the United States, where she had been exposed to postmodern art, such as Pop Art. Her ceramic works combined these influences with biographical works and psychological images. For example, in her works such as "Puppet Theater" or "Class Photo 1939" (1965), the artist aimed to express psychological and social themes, something that was unusual in Israeli ceramics of the time.

Starting in the 1960s, large scale sculptures began to appear in Israeli art, such as the bronze sculpture "Sheep of the Negev" by Itzhak Danziger, Assemblage art works, such as those of Igael Tumarkin and Yehiel Shemi, or works making use of various techniques such as installations or the use of non-artistic materials, such as those created by the artists of the group "Ten Plus," while at the same time ceramic works continued to be limited by the size of the kilns in which they were fired. However, apparently it was the influence of conceptual art, which arrived in Israel in the 1970s, that cut off ceramic activity from Israeli art. This is particularly noticeable against the background of "earth" and "place" imagery among the Israeli artistic vanguard of this period.

== From deconstruction to reconstruction, 1980–2010 ==
In the 1980s a fundamental change occurred in the way Israeli ceramic art was perceived. The primary cause of the change was the disruption of the local tradition in Israeli ceramics. Some of the reasons can be discerned in the perception of a break which Israeli society felt in a delayed reaction to the Yom Kippur War, and in reaction to the First Intifada. In addition the influence of postmodern culture began to trickle into the local culture.

Even though postmodernism had once been described as the expression of "the personal, [with a tendency towards the] hand-made, metaphorical, figurative, [and] decorative", traits that came naturally to Israeli ceramic artists and their art, paradoxically the distance between them and mainstream Israeli art widened. At the same time, in painting, sculpture, and photography objections began to be heard against the status of the object as a work of art, whereas until the 1990s the field of Israeli ceramics had primarily adopted the attitude of "identity politics," as the central tenet of postmodernism. In place of historical and archeological relationships, a series of personal relationships began to appear, most of them expressivist, which deviated from the traditional Israeli ceramic tradition that had existed up to this time.

This sidelining of ceramics, and especially of pottery, from the main museums, led to the establishment of a number of independent cooperative galleries in Jerusalem and Tel Aviv, for the display and merchandising of ceramics, such as "Ruach Cadim" (1987), the "Altogether 8" group (1990), and "Shlush Shloshim (1992). In 1991 Aharon Kahana's house in Ramat Gan was opened as a ceramics gallery.

=== Myths in the material, 1980-1990 ===
In spite of the marginal place the medium occupied, postmodern expressions in ceramics did have a certain impact because of the works of Gideon Ofrat, one of the most important of the artists who translated postmodern thinking into an aesthetic in the 1980s. In 1985 Ofrat curated the exhibition "Toward a Myth Without God" in the Jerusalem Artists House. In the exhibition catalog, Ofrat described ceramics as an expression of metaphysics, and pottery and pots as a means of direct connection to nature. A connection that Ofrat described as a dialectic of "proceeding toward a double eternity – an eternity of absorbing living and an eternity of absorbing dying" connected to the practicality and the symbolism of the pottery. In this Ofrat reflected the phenomenology of Martin Heidegger and Jacques Derrida, who emphasized earth and object (and the pitcher as a characteristic expression of this) as an intersection between life and death.

Many of the artists sought to probe the personal and the biographical through archetypal images, and thus express the symbolic dimension of art. From the point of view of form, it was manifested by developing means of sculptural expression in a more figurative direction and with a tendency toward ignoring the individual object in favor of the sculptural array. Siona Shimshi, for example, developed her ceramic sculpture as a series of archetypal human forms made of bare material. Nora and Naomi began to communicate with the sculptural field when they started to make use of motifs of journeys or nature images. The works of Moshe Shek are somewhere on the spectrum between ceramics and sculpture, expressed in a sort of postmodern incarnation of the Israeli ceramic tradition. The enormous pieces he created, which he called "containers" (1986), were decorated with simple designs that emphasized the natural colors of the material, and these sculptures displayed stylized imaginary animals made of clay cylinders that emanated echoes of "Canaanite" sculpture. Other artists, such as David Morris and Mark Yudell, used images specifically in order to create a private mythological world, which reflected their personal experiences, along with a dollop of humor and irony.

Another aspect of the preoccupation with the biographical can be seen in the infiltration of religious motifs into Israeli art in general, and into Israeli ceramic art in particular. Marie Balian, for example, an Armenian artist, from the 1970s geared her art towards monumental wall paintings made of glazed tiles. Her images were drawn from the Armenian ceramic tradition, with changes that were expressed in the design of the composition, which was transformed into the fantastic.

A similar trend can be seen in the work of Jewish ceramicists, whose Judaica works were no stranger to their culture of the material. Abraham and Pnina Gofer, for example, in the 1970s and 1980s displayed Seder plates made using casting molds, with images done in the ethnographic style, decorated with colorful glazes. In contrast, Meira Una, in the mid-1980s created a series of Chanukah lamps that combined images from Orthodox Judaism with architectural images. Her work is typified by the use of untreated material (without clay slips or glazes), with scribbles or engraved writing, and with no polishing or finishing of the form. All of these works emphasized the status of the personal and the preoccupation with ars poetica in ceramics and art.

At the same time, the most prominent ceramic artist who made use of Jewish motifs came from the field of art and painting. In the mid-1980s Moshe Gershuni began to create what became known as "Jewish ceramics." Gershuni made use of ready made plates that he bought second hand. On these he drew with ceramic paints for low-fire pottery. The images that appeared on his pottery combined excerpts from prayers, swastikas, and Magen Davids, which also can be seen in his paintings from these years. Exhibitions of these works in 1988 at Bezalel and in 1990 at the Tel Aviv Museum of Art generated wide publicity.

=== Body, fragments, and slivers of identity ===
Clear signs of the coming transition from pottery to ceramic sculpture could be seen during the second half of the 1980s and the first half of the 1990s. A large number of ceramic artists began to adopt ideas from painting and sculpture in their art. These ideas, in the eyes of these artists, conferred a new legitimacy on pottery and on the objects they created, both as an expression of their personal feelings and as an expression of ars poetica.

An example of the renewed relationship between sculpture and pottery can be seen in the works of artists on the border between traditional pottery and contemporary art. Rayah Redlich, for example, created large scale pots, which she presented as a renewed esthetic and cultural examination, and on which she used techniques of printing and painting "on the shards." Many of these works were displayed on pedestals that were part of the exhibit. And Daniel Davis used his potter's wheel to create large scale pots whose "shards" were then joined in bundles by steel strips. A group of about 70 of them appeared as part of "A Woman of the Pots," a performance and film created by his wife, Adina Bar-On, in 1990. Besides being used for musical percussion instruments, the pots pointed to themes like death and Judaism. Another group that dealt with the imagery of the material and of pottery by means of a representative medium was the Zik Group, whose works include a pot as a central image. In the installation "Anarzik" (1997), for example, the group created, on the structure of a potter's wheel, a complex pot that underwent a transformation of its technology and its form before the eyes of the public.

Another prominent artist was Lidia Zavadsky, who even served as the head of the Department of Ceramics and Glass Design at Bezalel Academy of Arts and Design in Jerusalem. Like other artists, Zavadsky inserted sculpture into her work as an integral part of her postmodern approach. Between the years 1992-1994 Zavadsky produced a series of pot-sculptures that turned out to be the highlight of her artistic output. The pots were monumental in size, glazed in intense colors, and a combination of work on the potter's wheel and sculpture. In spite of her themes of corporeality and death, the form and the internal relationships were the central artistic concern of Zavadsky's work. Through them the artist grappled with European and Asian pottery traditions. These works received more artistic recognition than any ceramic works up to that time and were displayed as well in the Israel Museum.

Only at the end of the 20th century and the beginning of the 21st did ceramic artists begin to make more consistent use of installation art within ceramic art. Artists such as Talia Tokatly, Hadass Rosenberg Nir, Shlomit Bauman, Yael Atzmony, Maya Muchawsky Parnas, and others created installations that combined different media, such as sculpture, ceramics, video, etc. In their works we see a combining of elements of their personal identity through the disassembly and assembly of objects saturated with political or personal history.

An opposing philosophy to this sculptural trend was the return to the pottery tradition of which one expression was the increasing adoption of porcelain as the material used on potter's wheels and in casting beginning in the 1990s. This happened both because this material began to arrive in Israel on a regular basis, and because artists began to be trained in the use of this material within the academic framework as well as privately. Among the artists who began to use porcelain on potter's wheels was Irit Abba. The use of this material sharpened her concentration on the form of the pot and allowed her to develop a deconstructionist concept of the pot, of her perception of pottery, and of her view of European culture. She emphasized the materiality of the pots and jugs she produced in the early 2000s by using slotting and chinking on their surface, by combining the porcelain with "paper clay," Egyptian paste, and shavings, and by using intense colors. In other artists as well, such as Esther Beck and Shulamit Teiblum-Millar, we can see this renewed interest in pottery and in the materials of ceramics to emphasize the work processes used in the creation of artistic objects.

In spite of massive training in the technology of design, the disappearance of the ceramics industry in Israel pushed artists, and particularly designers, to the creation of individual objects or of objects in small series, and sometimes in large ones, using hand casting techniques. The most prominent of these artisPrimitive technologyts are designers such as Ami Derech, Dov Ganchrow, and Jonathan Hopp.

== See also ==
- Stone vessels in ancient Judaea
