= Siona Shimshi =

Israeli artist (1939–2018)

- ציונה שמשי
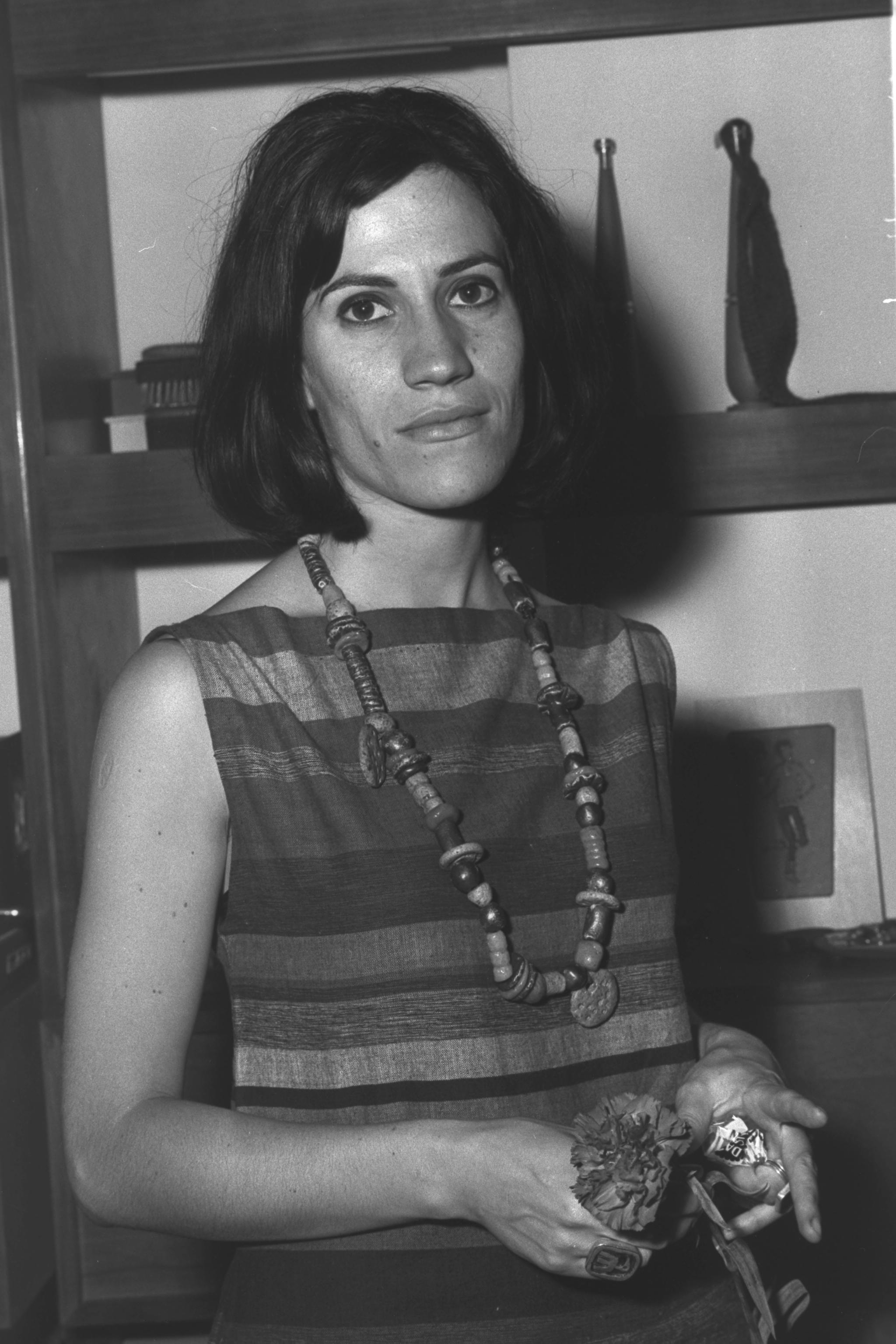
- Shimshi in 1963
- Born: July 14, 1939; Tel Aviv, Mandatory Palestine
- Died: October 16, 2018 (aged 79); Tel Aviv, Israel
- Education: Avni Institute, Alfred University, Greenwich House Pottery
- Known for: Painter, sculptor, textile designer
- Notable work: 33 solo exhibitions, 50 group exhibitions, curator of 21 thematic exhibitions and the Israeli Internet Art Biennial (2012–2014)
- Spouse: Jachin Hirsch (1934–2011)
- Awards: Arie El-Hanani: Prize for Art in Architecture (1988)
- Patrons: Collaborated with architects Dora Gad. Aba Elchanani, Rafael Blumenfeld, Heinz Penchel
- Website: art-sionashimshi.com

Siona Shimshi (also "Ziona"; Hebrew: ציונה שמשי; July 14, 1939 – October 16, 2018) was an Israeli painter, sculptor, ceramist, and textile designer.

== Early life ==
Siona Shimshi was born on July 14, 1939, in Tel Aviv, to Haya Rivka (Kuklanski) and Avraham Shimshi, who had immigrated to Mandate Palestine from Lithuania in 1933. She married Jachin Hirsch, an Israeli filmmaker, in 1961.

She studied at the Avni Institute in Tel Aviv from 1956 to 1959, with Avigdor Stematsky, Yehezkel Streichman, and Moshe Mokady. She also studied ceramics at Alfred University in New York, from 1959 to 1962, as well as at Greenwich House Pottery in New York City.

== Art career ==
In 1965, she was a co-founder of a group of artists called the "10+ Group", along with artists Buky Schwartz, Raffi Lavie, and others.

Shimshi was head of the Ceramic Design Department and taught as a professor at the Bezalel Academy of Art and Design in Jerusalem, from 1979 to 1987. In 1979, she designed the set for a performance of A Simple Story by Shmuel Yosef Agnon for the Habimah Theater in Tel Aviv.

In 1993–94, she was the curator of an exhibition of Dora Gad, in the Tel Aviv Museum of Art.

Among her creations are a work in wood that is exhibited in the King David Hotel in Jerusalem, a wall hanging at the Tel Aviv Hilton, a 1998 sculpture for Israel's 50th anniversary that is exhibited in Holon, glass walls at Kennedy Airport in New York City, and a 2004 portrait painting of Natan Alterman that appears on the facade of Tel Aviv City Hall.

== Awards ==
Shimshi was awarded the 1988 Arie El Hanani Prize by the Joshua Rabinowitz Foundation for Arts, for her sculpture in Goren Goldstein Park in Tel Aviv.

== Death ==
Shimshi died in Tel Aviv on October 16, 2018, at the age of 79. She was buried at Yarkon Cemetery.

== See also ==
- Israeli ceramics
