= Zahara Schatz =

Israeli artist

- זהרה ש"ץ
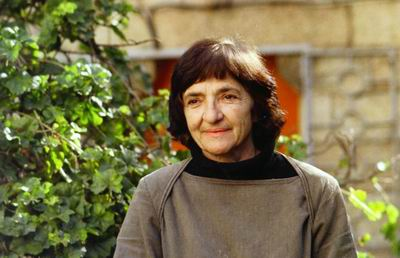
- Born: Zohara Schatz; July 20, 1916; Jerusalem, Jerusalem Sanjak, Ottoman Empire
- Died: August 4, 1999 (aged 83); Jerusalem, Israel
- Other names: Zohara Sandow, Zahara Sandow, Zahara Schatz Sandow
- Education: École nationale supérieure des arts décoratifs, Académie de la Grande Chaumière
- Occupations: Artist, craftsperson, designer
- Known for: Painting, sculpture, plastic arts
- Movement: Israeli art
- Spouse: Elliott Franz Sandow
- Father: Boris Schatz

Zahara Schatz (Hebrew: זהרה ש"ץ; 1916–1999), was an Israeli artist and designer. She was the daughter of Boris Schatz, who founded the Bezalel Academy of Art and Design in Jerusalem. She was best known for the six-branched menorah she designed for the entrance to the Yad Vashem, Israel's official memorial to the victims of the Holocaust.

== Biography ==
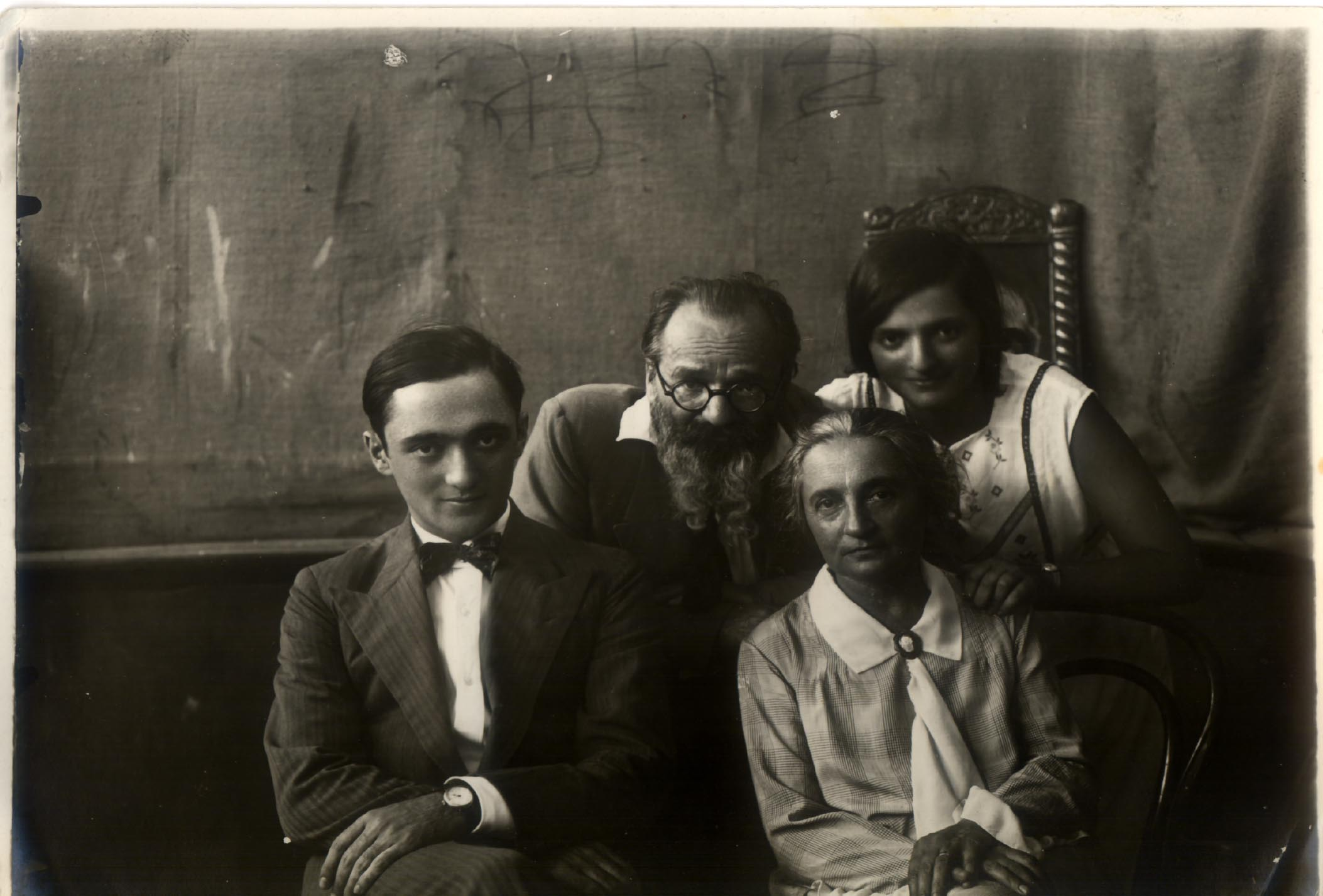
Zahara Schatz, with her parents and brother

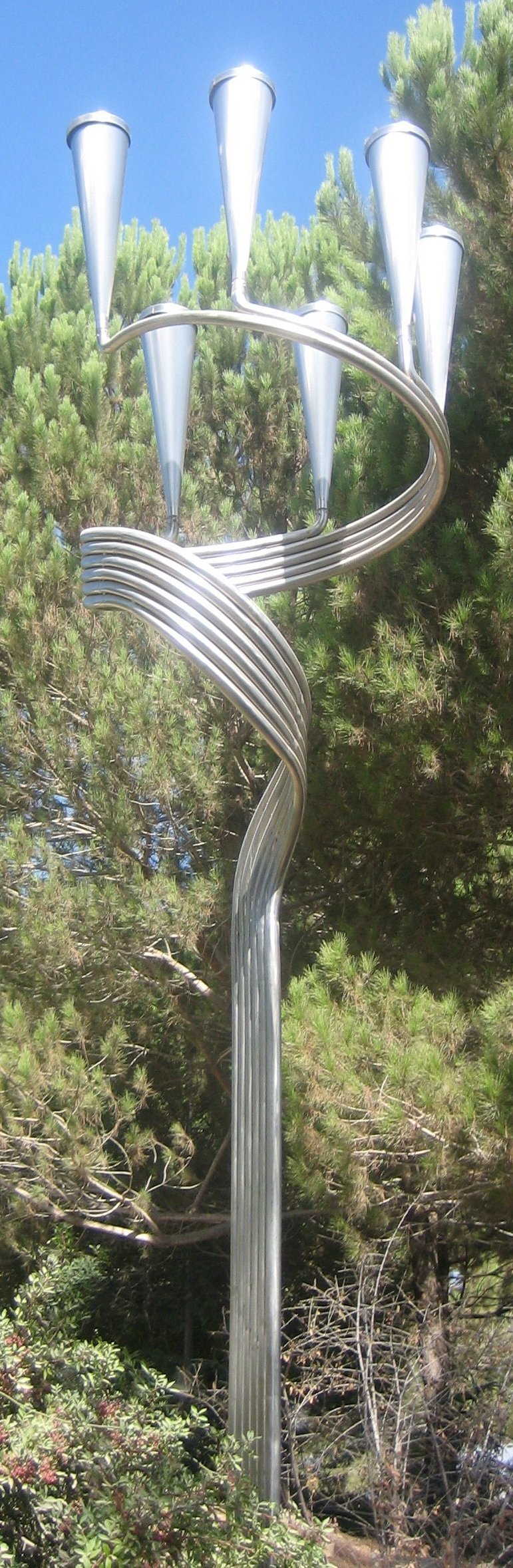
Six-branch candelabrum by Zahara Schatz, Yad Vashem, Jerusalem, Israel

Zohara ("Zahara") Schatz was born on July 20, 1916, in Jerusalem, Jerusalem Sanjak, Ottoman Empire. Her father was Boris Schatz and her brother was artist Bezalel or "Lilik".

She studied at the École nationale supérieure des arts décoratifs (English: National School of Decorative Arts) in Paris from 1934 to 1937. As well as classes at Académie de la Grande Chaumière.

The Schatz children were both artists. They abandoned their father's predilection for Romantic Classicism and his search for a Jewish Eretz Israel-style in favor of a European-American modernism. However Zahara followed her father's dualism: the pursuit of both fine art and crafts (or design).

== Art career ==
After graduation Schatz moved to the United States, settling in California. She married American sculptor Elliott Franz Sandow (1910–1976). In the 1940s Schatz taught art classes at the California Labor School in Berkeley. She started working in plastic in the 1940s, designing and building acrylic lamps.

Schatz was part of the Big Sur artists'/writers' colony that included San Francisco sculptor Benny Bufano, author Henry Miller, her sister-in-law Louise Schatz, and her brother Bezalel Schatz. She lived in Berkeley, California, where she was close with courtroom sketch artist Rosalie Ritz, her husband Erwin Ritz and their daughter, publisher and managing editor of The Environmentalist, Janet Ritz.

Schatz exhibited in the U.S. and Europe. In 1951, Schatz won an award for the Table Lamp Model No. T-4-S, at the Museum of Modern Art (MoMA) in New York City. Her winning table lamp design was manufactured by the Heifez Company, the sponsor of the MoMA competition.

In 1951, she returned to Israel, however she maintained a residency in Berkeley, California up until the 1970s. In 1951, Zahara Schatz, Bezalel Schatz, and her sister-in-law Louise Schatz formed a craft workshop "Yaad" located in Israel, and rooted in European-American modernism.

In 1959, she participated in the Venice Biennale of 1959 and designed the gate, built at the Bezalel Academy for Art and Design for the President's House.

She worked as an adviser on industrial design at the Ministry of Commerce and Industry for Israel.

Schatz died of a long illness in Jerusalem on August 4, 1999, at the age of 83.

== Awards and recognition ==
- 1951: award for a table lamp design, Table Lamp Model No. T-4-S, "Low-Cost Lighting Competition/Exhibition", the Museum of Modern Art, New York City, New York
- 1955: Israel Prize, for the Fine Arts Award
- 1954: medal of honor, Milan Triennial (Triennale di Milano)
- 1959: Dizengoff Prize for Sculpture
- 1959: participation in the Venice Biennale
- 1960: Yad Vashem Prize, for a six-branch candelabrum
- 1991: Shoshanna Ish-Shalom Prize, Jerusalem

== Exhibitions ==
- 1951, New Lamps, juried group exhibition, Museum of Modern Art, New York City, New York, US; jury chaired by Rene d'Harnoncourt
- 2006, Zahara Schatz: A Retrospective. The Third Exhibition in the Schatz House Series, solo retrospective exhibition, Jerusalem Artists House, Jerusalem; curated by Gideon Ofrat
- 2022–2023, California Modernist Women, group exhibition, Harvey Milk Terminal 1, San Francisco International Airport, San Mateo County, California, US

== See also ==
- List of Israeli women artists
- List of Israel Prize recipients
- Visual arts in Israel
