= The Environmentalist =

- Website type: Political weblog
- Website: the-environmentalist.org
- Launched: December 6, 2006

The Environmentalist is a public interest, eco-investigative journalism website that reports on the geopolitics and science of climate change, general politics, sustainable living, business impact and the history of affected regions.

== Founding ==
Founded in November, 2006, The Environmentalist's writers include Huffington Post environmental and geopolitical contributor, Janet Ritz; Presidential Climate Action Plan executive director, William S. Becker; award-winning playwright and author, Sherman Yellen; author of The Real McCain, Cliff Schecter; filmmaker Greg Reitman, producer of the 2008 Sundance Film Festival award-winning documentary, Fields of Fuel; Democratic activist Terry Leach; as well as scientists, environmental lawyers and various guest contributors.

Founding publisher and managing editor, Janet Ritz, is the daughter of award-winning Associated Press courtroom artist and journalist, Rosalie Ritz. An environmental activist and writer who was mentored in her youth by writer and composer Joaquin Nin-Culmell, concert promoter Bill Graham and artist Zahara Schatz, Janet Ritz founded The Environmentalist in 2006 as a forum for unfiltered climate science information after learning from colleagues about the editing of James E. Hansen's climate science reports by the Bush administration.

In August, 2007, Ritz wrote an article for the Huffington Post which reported cuts in climate science satellites that were concurrent with a declaration by the Bush administration to become more involved in fighting global warming. This led to an expansion of The Environmentalist's format to include topics beyond the environment. In January, 2008, The Environmentalist began to be picked up by wire services. In April, 2008, the editorial page was launched when Ritz published a tribute to her late mother's work on both the Huffington Post and The Environmentalist. World news, history and resource pages followed soon after.

== Format ==
The Environmentalist displays articles under the following sections (verticals): Home, Politics, Climate, World, Science, History, Business, Resources, Editorial, Lifestyle, Eco-Links, Tags and Archive. The articles are noted for their use of illustrations, photographs, charts and diagrams to clarify article points and conclusions.

A public interest website, The Environmentalist, is published under a Creative Commons 3.0 license with many of its articles carried by various online wire services, including Reuters, Chicago Sun-Times, Atlanta Journal-Constitution, Fox News, IBS and USA Today.

== Notable articles ==
In November, 2008, The Environmentalist published an editorial by Presidential Climate Action Plan (PCAP) executive director, Bill Becker, entitled "Struggling for Obama's Soul" that followed a review of Becker's book, The 100 Day Action Plan to Save the Planet summarizing the PCAP developed for the incoming administration.

In August 2008, The Environmentalist published filmmaker Greg Reitman's personal account, "A Filmmaker's 'Fields of Fuel'" of his journey that led to the 2008 Sundance Film Festival Audience Award-winning documentary Fields of Fuel.

In July 2008, The Environmentalist published an article entitled: "James Hansen to the G8: We've passed safe CO2 levels" which included a letter from Dr. James E. Hansen of NASA's Goddard Institute for Space Studies, in which Hansen warned that the maximum safe level of atmospheric CO_{2} (350 ppm) had been exceeded (385 ppm):

My address tomorrow to the United Nations University G8 Symposium summarizes scientific data revealing that the safe level of atmospheric carbon dioxide (CO_{2}) is no more than 350 ppm (parts per million), and is likely less than that. Implications for energy policy are profound, as atmospheric CO_{2} is already 385 ppm.

Hansen's letter was addressed to Prime Minister Yasuo Fukuda of Japan, host of the 2008 G8 Summit. He requested Fukuda's leadership in addressing the findings.

In May, 2008, an article by contributing writer, Terry Leach, entitled: "Hillary Clinton's 'Victory' in Pennsylvania: The Rush Limbaugh Effect" and subsequently picked up by Reuters, the Huffington Post, and the Chicago Sun-Times, which posited that the votes for Hillary Clinton cast during the Pennsylvania primary should be explored to assess the impact by Rush Limbaugh's Operation Chaos. This resulted in the phrase "The Limbaugh Effect" being used across the media sphere, which earned a response from Rush Limbaugh that was answered by The Environmentalist's managing editor in an article entitled: "Why Rush Limbaugh Thinks This Site is Unfriendly".

== Endorsements ==
On February 4, 2008, The Environmentalist endorsed Senator Barack Obama for President of the United States, citing his environmental policy positions as the reason for choosing him over the other candidates.

On January 31, 2008, managing editor, Janet Ritz, writing outside the environmentalism genre, reviewed and endorsed, a new release, Crossing the Line, by Ryko recording artist, Bill Cutler, an album that included deceased Grateful Dead lead guitarist, Jerry Garcia, among other surviving notables of the last three decades, many of whom had endorsed Senator Obama.

== See also ==
- Bill Graham
- James Hansen
- Joaquin Nin-Culmell
- Greg Reitman
- Rosalie Ritz
- Zahara Schatz
- Sherman Yellen
- George Witte
