= Nora and Naomi =

Pair of Israeli artists

Nora and Naomi נורה ונעמי
- Education: Bezalel Academy of Art and Design
- Known for: Ceramics, Sculpture
- Awards: 1986 Certificate of Excellence, The International Art Competition - New York; 1998 Film "Escape" nominated for screening at the first International Film Festival on Ceramics, Montpellier, France

"Nora and Naomi" (Hebrew: נורה ונעמי) are Naomi Bitter (born 1936) and Nora Kochavi (1934–1999), a pair of Israeli artists who worked together between 1962 and 1999.

Nora and Naomi began their joint work in 1962, after they met as students at the first class of the Bezalel Ceramics department. During the last year they opened a joint studio in the Talpiot neighborhood of Jerusalem. In the early years of their work they mainly as potters, using Potter's wheel. When the family of Kochavi moved to Tel Aviv, the two continued to work simultaneously in the two studios.

Nora and Naomi's transition to sculpture, which began during the 1970s, was an attempt to relate to nature and archaeological evidence of Eretz Israel, as well as an evidence to the influence of abstract art. In 1972 they held the first sculpture exhibition, named "Impressions from Sinai", which its works influenced by the natural forms of the Sinai deserts. During the 1980s references to the human figure began to appear in their work, through the use of symbolic forms such as trees or boats.

Nora died in 1999. Naomi continued to work in her studio until 2003. The Nora and Naomi Archive is held at the Information Center for Israeli Art at the Israel Museum, Jerusalem.

== Prizes ==
- 1986 Certificate of Excellence, The International Art Competition - New York
- 1998 The film Escape was nominated for screening at the first International Film Festival on Ceramics, Montpellier, France

== See also ==
- Israeli ceramics
