= Lidia Zavadsky =

Israeli visual artist

Lidia Zavadsky לידיה זבצקי
- Born: 1937; Drohobycz, Poland
- Died: November 8, 2001 (aged 64); Jerusalem, Israel
- Known for: Ceramic design

Lidia Zavadsky (Hebrew: לידיה זבצקי; 1937 – November 8, 2001) was an Israeli visual artist. Her work mainly focused on ceramic sculpture. She was head of the ceramics department at Bezalel Academy of Art. She was a Holocaust survivor.

== Early life ==
Lidia Zavadsky (originally Felicia Schindler) was born in 1937 in Drohobycz, Poland (today Drohobych, Ukraine). When she was 2 years old her father was exiled to Siberia and later was recruited to the Red Army and his traces were lost. After the Nazi invasion she stayed with her mother in the Drohobycz ghetto. After the end of the ghetto they hid in a cellar for two years. Towards the end of World War II they were taken to Wrocław, Poland. There her mother remarried and gave birth to her half-brother in 1946.

In 1958 her family immigrated to Israel while she stayed in Poland. She graduated in law studies at the University of Wrocław. After graduation she joined her family in 1961. In Israel she found difficulties in adapting and could not use her academic skills for employment. As a result, she worked in cleaning and soon felt discontented, turning to the Polish embassy to ask for a permit to return. There she met a young man Pyotr who came with the same purpose. They found support in each other and decided to stay in Israel and start a new career in art studies at the Bezalel Academy.

Due to the lack of a sculpture studies department at Bezalel Academy, she opted to study in the ceramics department instead. During those days the department was focused on pottery. She supported her studies through cleaning the department's works, as well as restoring pottery at archaeological digs.

In 1966 her elder daughter was born followed by her son in 1977.

== Career ==
She excelled in her studies and after graduation she joined the department in 1965.

In 1982 she was invited as guest lecturer for McGregor Art School at Toowoomba, In 1981 she published a book about Rakou techniques and working processes. She was later appointed professor at Bezalel Academy. In the same year she was guest lecturer for a series of workshops in Canada. In 1987 she was nominated to be the head of the ceramics department.

During her years in Bezalel she transformed the department of ceramics from a department of pottery into an advocate of ceramic sculpture. Her art was characterized by deep intellectual curiosity and neverending experimentation with techniques, materials and ways of expression. She studied ancient traditional Chinese glazing methods of the Tang Dynasty in China and applied them to her art while creating human size jars in bright colors derived from lead.

She won numerous grants and awards, among them the Sandberg Prize (1992). It was the first time ever that this prize was awarded to an artist in the ceramics medium. This prize enabled her to start her research and experimentation with ancient traditional Chinese glazes.

Her last monumental work was a life-size realist sculpture in the image of a bright green donkey. it was displayed at the first Biennial of ceramics in Haaretz Museum and later she gifted it to the museum. This image was inspired by a donkey whom she cured and cared for in her back yard.

As a consequence of using toxic lead for her art, Lidia developed cancer and died at age 64 in November 2001. Her works are kept in local and international public collections.

One person Exhibitions

- 1977 – Ha'aretz Museum, Tel Aviv
- 1985 – "Contemporary Porcelain" New York.
- 1993 – Israel Museum, Jerusalem.
- 1994 – European Ceramics Work center
- 's-Hertogenbosch, Netherlands.
- 1994 – Kagelbanan gallery, Stockholm, Sweden
- 1995 – Kamaras Gallery, Borholm, Sweden
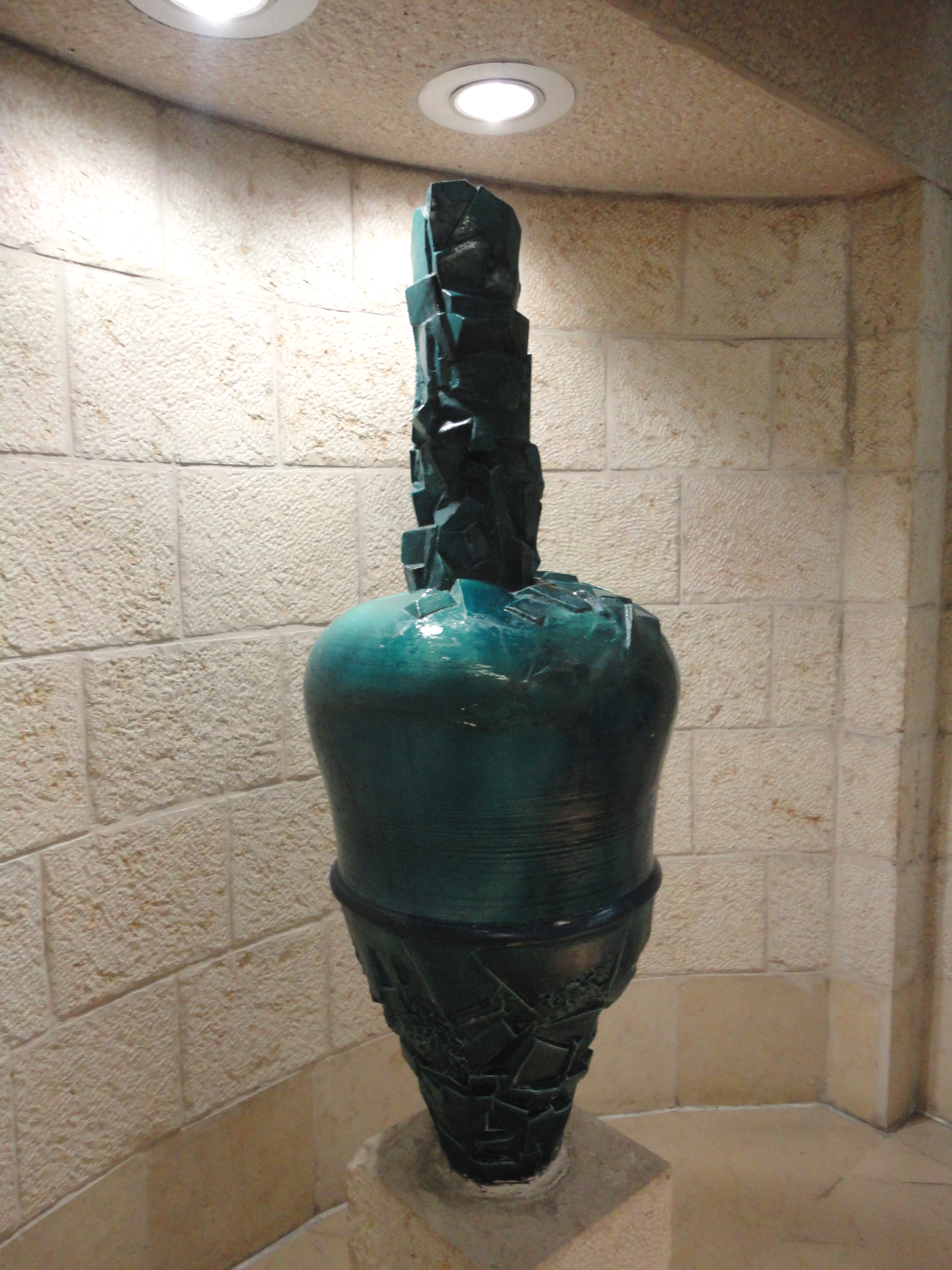
Stone Jar Jerusalem Municipality.

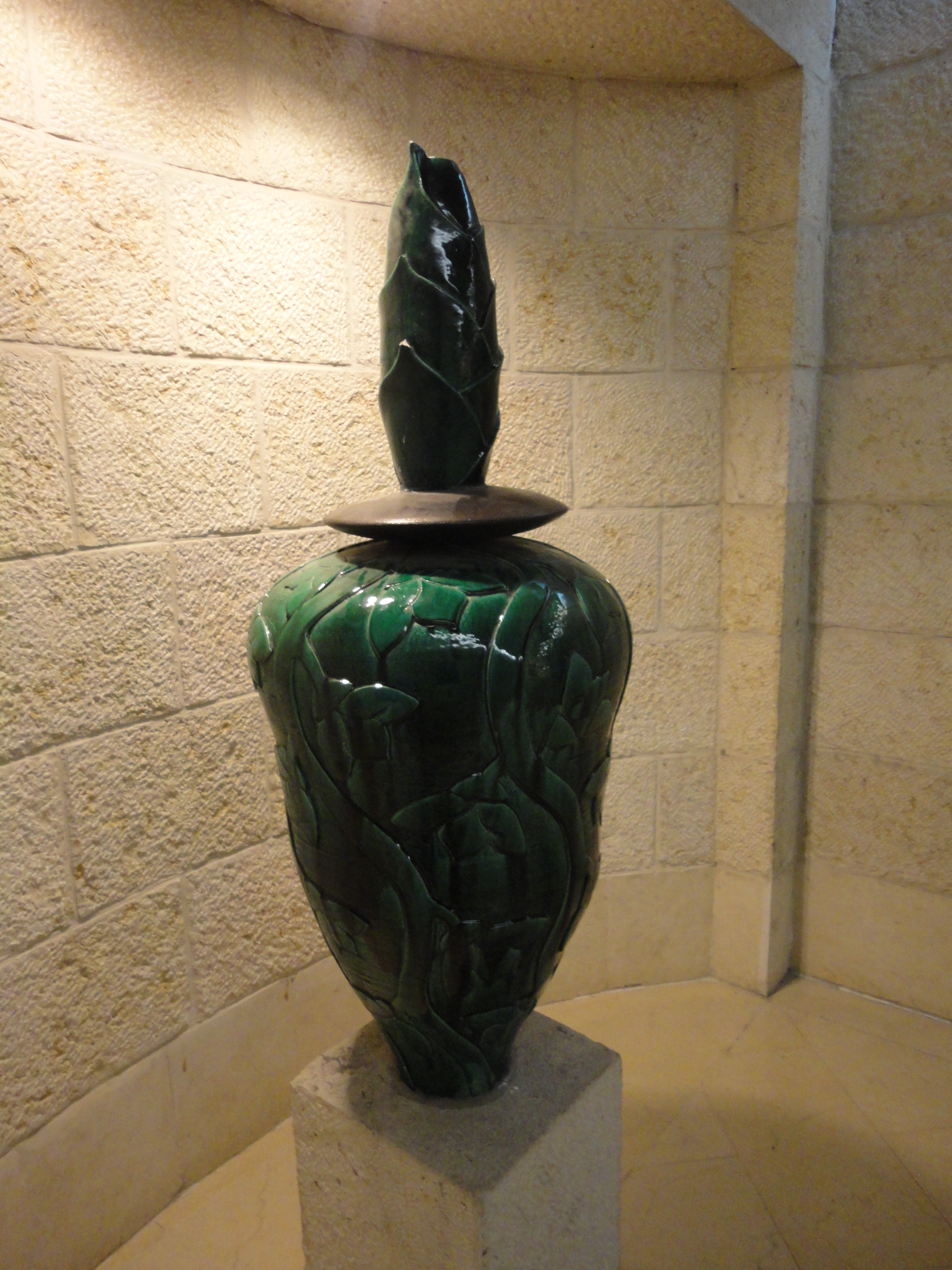
Jar 1993 Jerusalem Municipality

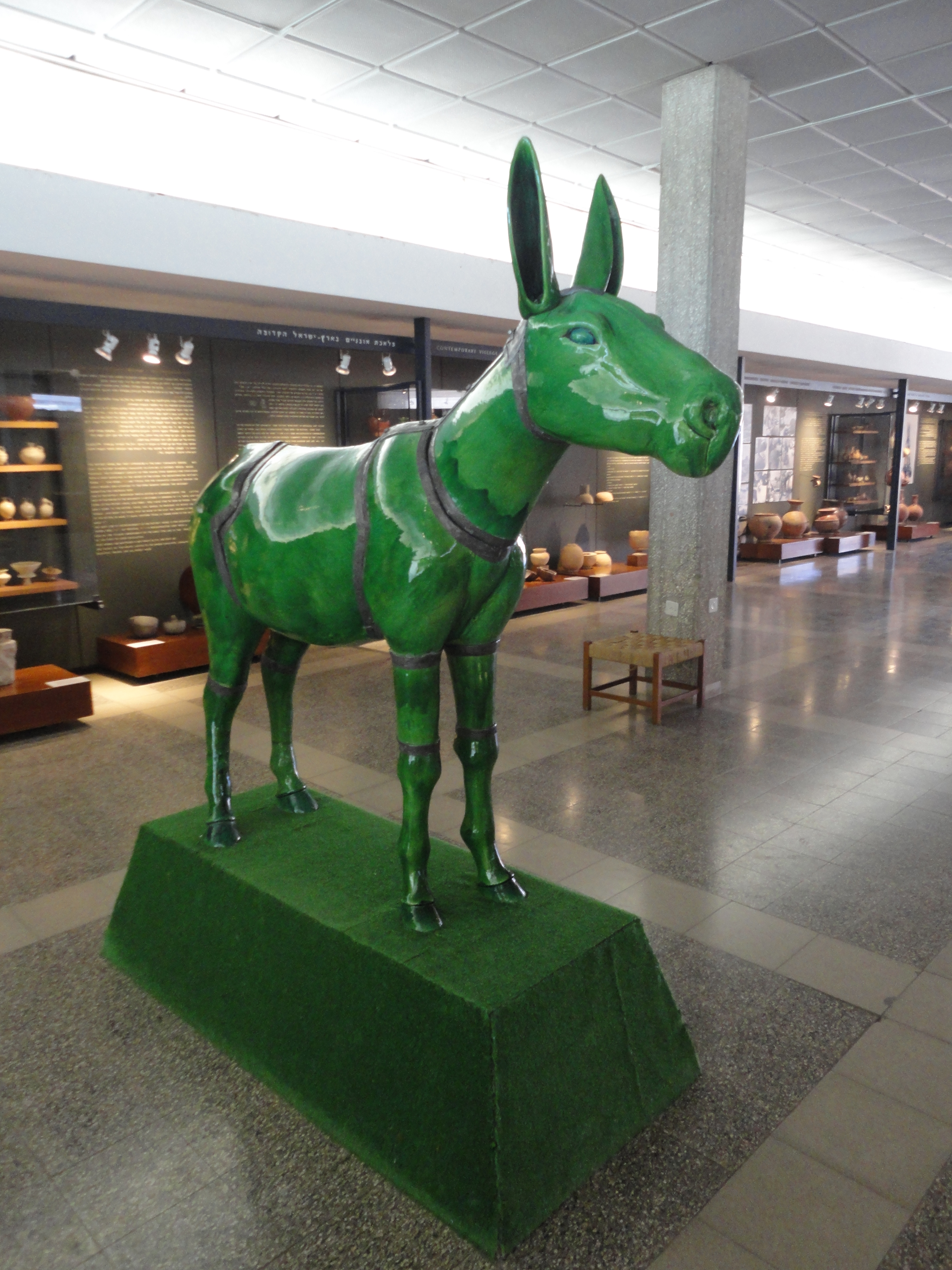
Efrayim, Efrayim 2000 Ha' aretz Museum

== See also ==
- Israeli ceramics

== Grants and awards ==
- 1990 Jerusalem Prize for Sculpture and Painting
- 1992 The Sandberg Grant for Development the Israel Museum, Jerusalem.

== Bibliography ==
- Levin, Michael, Large Jars- The series as an adventure, in: Lidia Zavadsky -Jars1993-1994
- הקרט, שרה (עורכת), 1280°, גיליון מס' 7, קיץ 2003 (גיליון המוקדש לזבצקי)
- זבצקי, לידיה, רקו: טכניקות ותהליכי עבודה, הוצאת המחלקה לקדרות, בצלאל, ירושלים, 1981
- זבצקי, לידיה, 13 בחומר, תיאטרון ירושלים, ירושלים, 1984
- זבצקי, לידיה, לידיה זבצקי, כדים 1993-1994, מוזיאון ישראל, ירושלים, 1995
- זבצקי, לידיה, בין עיצוב לפיסול: שישה בוגרי המחלקה לעיצוב קרמי, האקדמיה לאמנות ועיצוב בצלאל, ירושלים, עיריית ירושלים, האגף לתרבות, המחלקה לאמנות ועיצוב, ירושלים, 2001
- עפרת, גדעון, לידיה זבצקי: מעל ומעבר לחרס, ע. וי. זבצקי, תל אביב, 2011
