= Jacob Eisenberg =

Israeli artist

Jacob Eisenberg (Hebrew: יעקב איינזברג; 1897–1965) (also Yaakov Eisenberg) was an Israeli artist and a member of the Bezalel school.

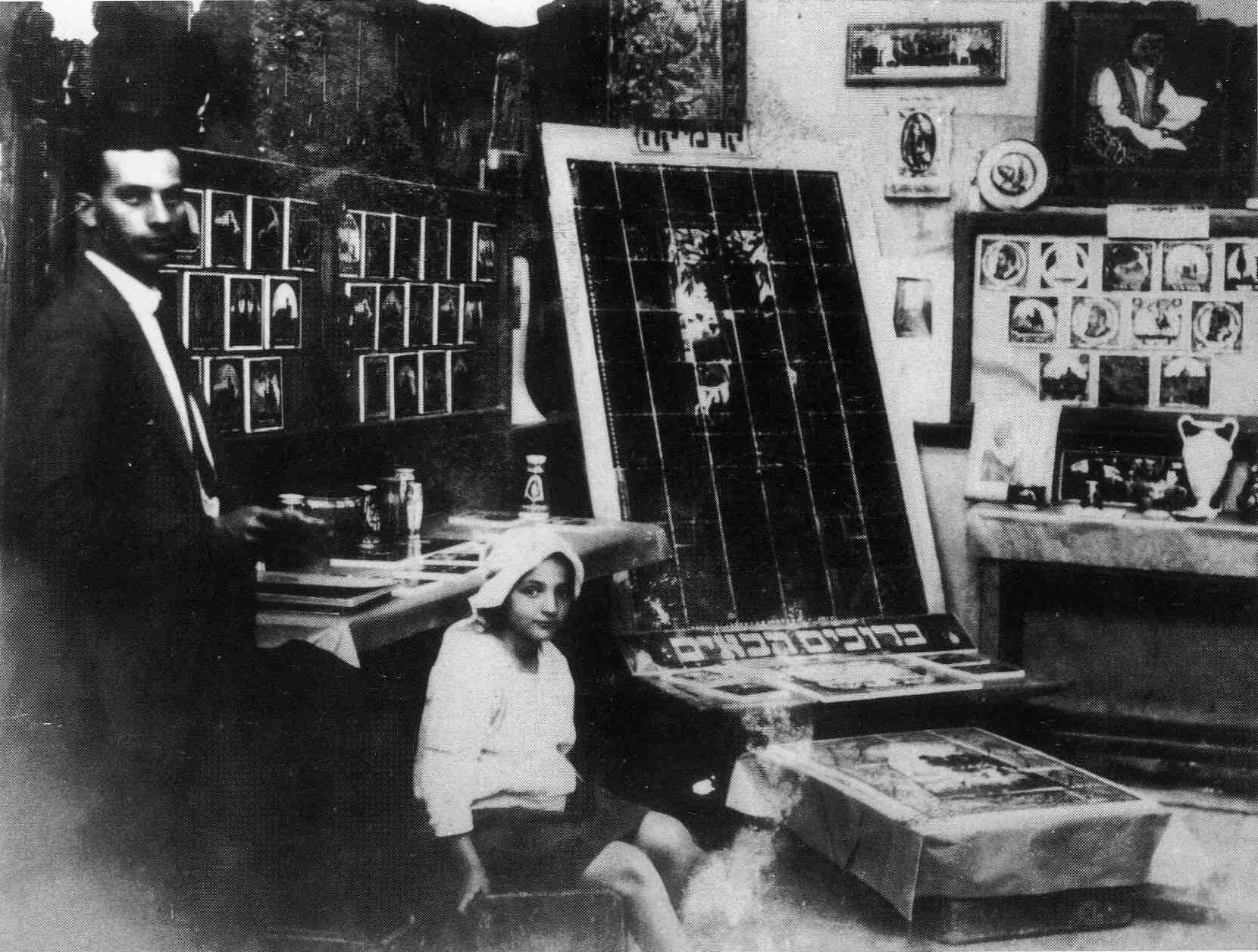
Tiles and ornamental vessels, plaques, and decorations for house facades, produced at the workshop. Standing left - Y. Eisenberg; seated: Zahara Schatz.

Eisenberg was born in Pinsk and immigrated to Mutasarrifate of Jerusalem in 1913. He studied art at the School for Arts and Crafts in Vienna, specializing in ceramics and at the Bezalel Academy of Art and Design in Jerusalem, where he continued as a teacher for many years.

Particularly notable was his creation of a series of ceramic plaques and murals for the early buildings of Tel Aviv. These included the city's first street signs, ceramic plaques in deep blue inscribed with the street names in Hebrew, Arabic and English that were affixed to the corners of buildings. The surviving plaques are now treasured historic landmarks. Large Eisenberg murals enliven the facades of several Tel Aviv buildings, including the 1925 Lederberg house, at the intersection of Rothschild Boulevard and Allenby Street. The four murals show a Jewish pioneer sowing and harvesting, a shepherd, and Jerusalem with a verse from Jeremiah 31:4, "Again I will rebuild thee and thous shalt be rebuilt."

== Works ==
- Stained Glass, Great Synagogue, Tel Aviv
- Ceramics and stained glass, Y.M.C.A., Jerusalem

== Exhibitions ==
- Jerusalem Artists' House, 1957
