= Rosalie Ritz =

American journalist

Rosalie Ritz (August 6, 1923 – April 18, 2008), born Rosalie Jane Mislove in Racine, Wisconsin, was an American journalist and courtroom artist who covered major United States trials in the 1960s through the 1990s. She worked with both CBS and Associated Press, and was presented with the Associated Press Award for Excellence in 1972.

== Personal life ==
The seventh of ten children, Ritz showed artistic talent at an early age. She attended the Layton School of Art, married World War II navy veteran and athlete, Erwin Ritz in 1946 and is the mother of four children: Barbara Bray, Sandra Ritz, Terry Leach and The Environmentalist publisher and managing editor, Janet Ritz.

== Early career ==
After her marriage to Erwin Ritz in 1946, Ritz moved from Milwaukee, WI, where she grew up, to Washington DC. There, she worked with a group of artists in Georgetown. During this time, several of Ritz's selected works (oil paintings) won places in national juried shows at the Corcoran Gallery of Art, the Smithsonian, and received an honorable mention at the Flower Gallery.

It was during these years in Washington DC, that Ritz first covered US Senate and US Congressional hearings, including the McCarthy Hearings, where cameras were barred. Ritz worked under contract for the Washington Post, CBS, Public TV, and the Associated Press. Selected drawings appeared in the Washington Post from these hearings.

== Courtroom art ==
In 1966, at the height of the Haight Ashbury counter-culture era, Ritz moved with her family to the San Francisco Bay Area. Ritz's sketches of the street scenes were published in the City Magazine and the San Francisco Examiner. Her work in Washington DC brought her to the attention of the local public television station KQED. From there, she began a career covering trials for the local CBS outlet, (KPIX) and for the Associated Press. This included the Patty Hearst trial, the Sirhan Sirhan trial, the Charles Manson trial, the trials of the Black Panthers, including Huey Newton, Eldridge Cleaver and David Hilliard, the trials of Angela Davis and Ruchell Magee, and the trials of the Soledad Brothers, the San Quentin Six, Mass Murderer Juan Corona, John Linley Frazier, the Presidio Mutiny Court-Martial at Fort Ord, the court-martial of Billy Dean Smith, Inez Garcia (second trial), Bill and Emily Harris (Symbionese Liberation Army), Russell Little and Joseph Remiro (Murder of Marcus Foster/Symbionese Liberation Army), Wendy Yoshimura, Camarillo State Hospital Grand Jury Hearings, the Hell's Angels, Alioto-Look Magazine Libel Trial, Alioto Conflict of Interest Trial, the Bonanno Brothers, Stephanie Kline, Larry Layton, Dan White, San Francisco Proposition Hearings, Sara Jane Moore, and Daniel Ellsberg and Anthony Russo/Pentagon Papers.

While covering these trials, Ritz worked with several journalists, including the late New York Daily News reporter Theo Wilson, Associated Press senior trial reporter and special correspondent, Linda Deutsch, and Associated Press chief United Nations correspondent, Edie Lederer.

Ritz's courtroom drawings of the Angela Davis trial were featured in the 2012 documentary, Free Angela and All Political Prisoners.

Ritz continued to cover trials through the early 1980s. In the 1990s, the Associated Press brought Ritz out of retirement to cover the O. J. Simpson civil trial.

== Shows and exhibitions ==
Early in Ritz's career, selected works (oil paintings) went on display at national juried shows at Corcoran Gallery of Art and at the Smithsonian.

During her years as a Courtroom Artist, Ritz's sketches appeared in numerous publications, including the Washington Post and various Associated Press affiliates. Ritz's sketches were also used on CBS news broadcasts and other media outlets.

In 1993, Ritz donated 1,837 courtroom drawings to the UC Berkeley Bancroft Library.

In 2005, the UC Berkeley Art Museum held an exposition of Ritz's sketches.

Later that year, the California Senate followed up with an exposition of Ritz's selected works.

== Death ==
Rosalie Ritz died in California on April 18, 2008, nine months after the passing of her husband of 61 years, Erwin Ritz. She is survived by four children, five grandchildren and one great-granddaughter.
