= Louise Schatz =

Canadian-born Israeli artist (1916–1997)

- לואיז שץ
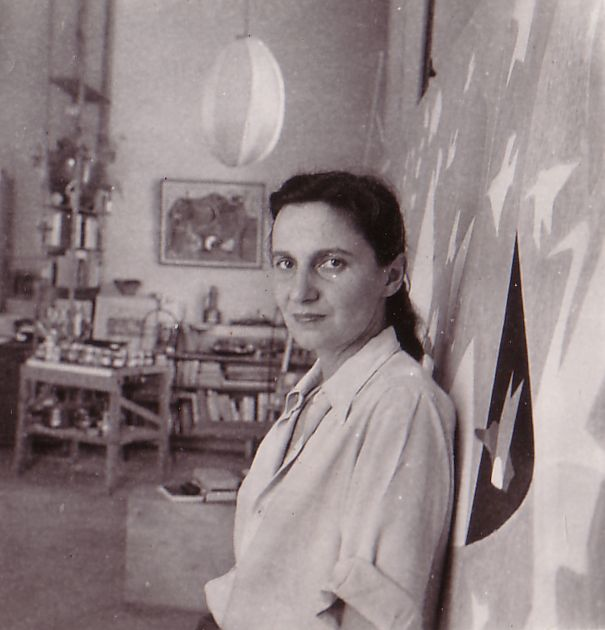
- Born: Louise Burton McClure; 1916; Vancouver, British Columbia, Canada
- Died: 1997 (aged 80–81); Jerusalem, Israel
- Other name: Luʼiz Shats
- Education: University of California, Berkeley
- Occupations: Painter, ceramist, textile designer
- Years active: 1930s–1990s
- Spouse: Bezalel Schatz (married 1948–1978)

Louise Schatz (Hebrew: לואיז שץ; née Louise Burton McClure; 1916–1997) was a Canadian-born Israeli painter, ceramist, and textile designer. She is one of the best known abstract watercolorist from Israel. She was active in Berkeley, Big Sur, Haifa, and Jerusalem.

== Biography ==
Louise McClure was born in 1916 in Vancouver, British Columbia, Canada, to a family of English descent. Her father John "Jack" McClure was a vaudeville theatre director. Her mother Evelyn (née Burton) was a dental assistant. At the age of 3, her family moved to Minnesota to be closer to her paternal grandparents. As a result of the Great Depression the McClure family moved to the San Francisco Bay Area for work.

She attended the University of California, Berkeley, where she received a bachelor's degree in art in 1939. During World War II between 1943 and 1945, she worked as a draftsman at a shipyard in San Francisco. She was a member of the "Californian Group of Seven", a Big Sur artist collective from 1945 to 1948.

She married Bezalel "Lilik" Schatz in 1948, the son of sculptor Boris Schatz. In 1951, Bezalel and Louise emigrated to Israel, settling 5 years later in the artist village of Ein Hod. Their home in Ein Hod was designed by architect David Resnick. She did not speak Hebrew nor have strong connections to Israel, besides that of her husband's family.

In 1951, Louise Schatz, Bezalel Schatz, and her sister-in-law Zahara Schatz formed a craft workshop "Yaad" in Israel, rooted in European-American modernism.

Her husband died in Jerusalem in 1978. She died in Jerusalem in 1997. Schatz's work is in museum collections including at the British Museum, and the Israel Museum, Jerusalem.

== Personal life ==
Louise had two sisters. Her sister Evelyn "Eve" Burton McClure, was the ex-wife of film director Jack Carr; actor Lyle Talbot; novelist Henry Miller; and sculptor Harry Dick Ross.
