= Israel Museum =

National museum of Israel in Jerusalem

The Israel Museum, Jerusalem

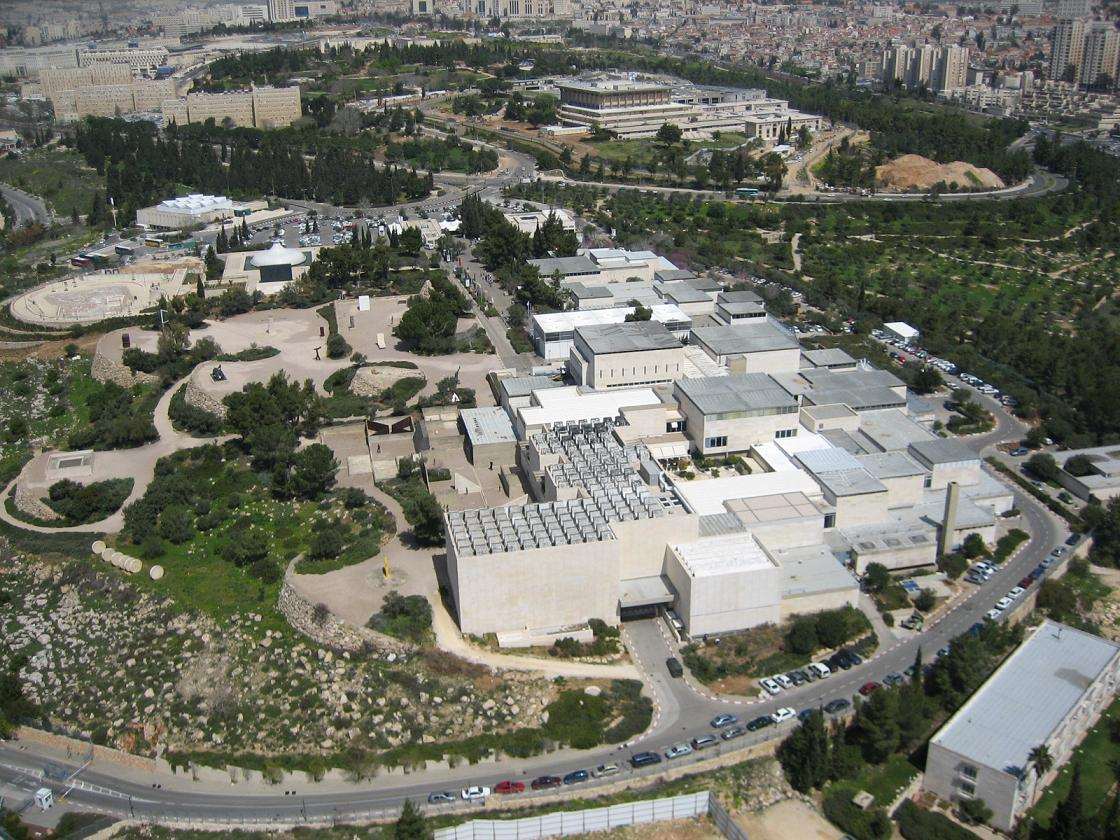
- Aerial photograph of the Israel Museum, with the Knesset building in the background
- Interactive fullscreen map
- Established: May 1965
- Location: Rupin 11; Givat Ram; Jerusalem, Israel
- Coordinates: 31°46′21″N 35°12′15″E
- Type: Art and history
- Key holdings: Dead Sea Scrolls, Holyland Model of Jerusalem, Mosaic of Rehob, Pilate stone, Tel Dan Inscription, Tzedek ve-Shalom, Venus of Berekhat Ram
- Collections: Archaeology, Jewish Art, Fine Art
- Collection size: Approx. 500,000 (2021)
- Visitors: 827,000 (2012)
- Director: Suzanne Landau
- Public transit access: Israel Museum/Wise
- Website: www.imj.org.il/en/

The Israel Museum (Hebrew: מוזיאון ישראל, romanized: Muze'on Yisrael, Arabic: متحف إسرائيل) is an art and archaeology museum in Jerusalem. It was established in 1965 as Israel's largest and foremost cultural institution, and an encyclopedic museum. It is situated on a hill in the Givat Ram neighborhood of Jerusalem, adjacent to the Bible Lands Museum, the National Campus for the Archaeology of Israel, the Knesset, the Israeli Supreme Court, and the Hebrew University of Jerusalem.

The Israel Museum houses a collection of approximately 500,000 items. Its holdings include the world's most comprehensive collections of the archaeology of the Holy Land, and Jewish art and life, as well as significant and extensive holdings in the fine arts, the latter encompassing eleven separate departments: Israeli Art, European Art, Modern Art, Contemporary Art, Prints and Drawings, Photography, Design and Architecture, Asian Art, African Art, Oceanian Art, and Arts of the Americas.

Among the unique objects on display are the Venus of Berekhat Ram, the interior of a 1736 Zedek ve Shalom synagogue from Suriname, necklaces worn by Jewish brides in Yemen, a mosaic Islamic prayer niche from 17th-century Persia, and a nail attesting to the practice of crucifixion in Jesus' time. An urn-shaped building in the grounds of the museum, the Shrine of the Book, houses the Dead Sea Scrolls and artifacts discovered at Masada. It is one of the largest museums in the region.

== History ==
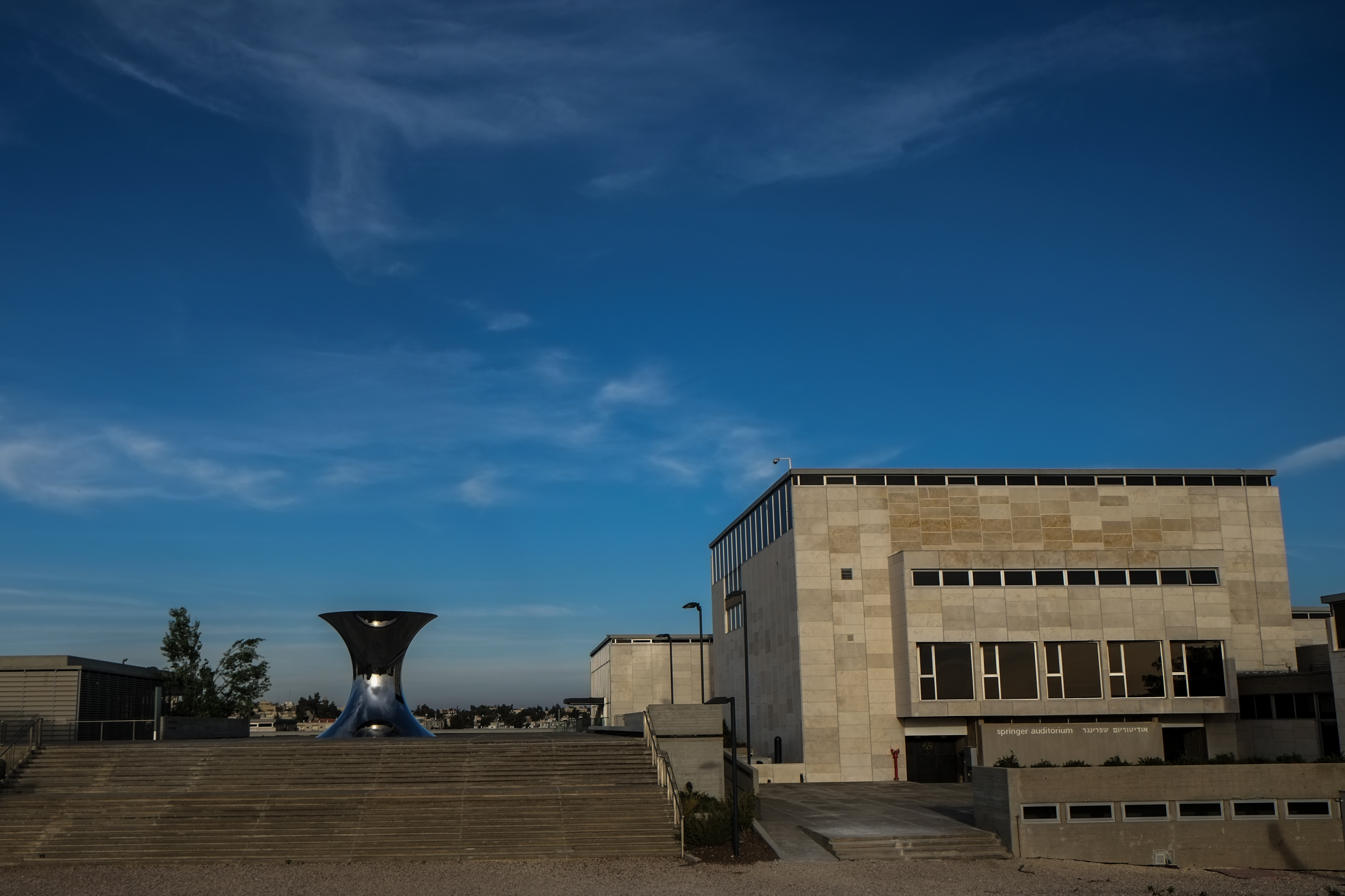
View of museum from its upper level, with Anish Kapoor sculpture

Jerusalem mayor Teddy Kollek was the driving spirit behind the establishment of the Israel Museum, one of the leading art and archaeology museums in the world. The museum houses works dating from prehistory to the present day in its Archaeology, Fine Arts, and Jewish Art and Life Wings and features extensive holdings of biblical and Land of Israel archaeology. The museum was established in May 1965. By 2005 its collection contained around 250,000 objects, increasing to nearly 500,000 objects, representing a broad sample of world material culture.

In 1982, the museum bought 1,000 items from the collection created by the late Moshe Dayan, including pieces which were acquired illegally. The museum paid US$1 million which was funded through donations, (Note: The donations were made by Laurence and Wilma Tisch ($900,000), Reuben Hecht ($50,000), and Leon Fiszman ($50,000).) leading to criticism from archaeologists. In 1988 the museum bought an ivory pomegranate from an anonymous seller for $550,000; its inscription was later identified as a forgery. In 1999, the museum received around 800,000 visitors which fell to 350,000 in 2003 during the First Intifada and then increasing. In 2012, the museum received around 827,000 visitors.

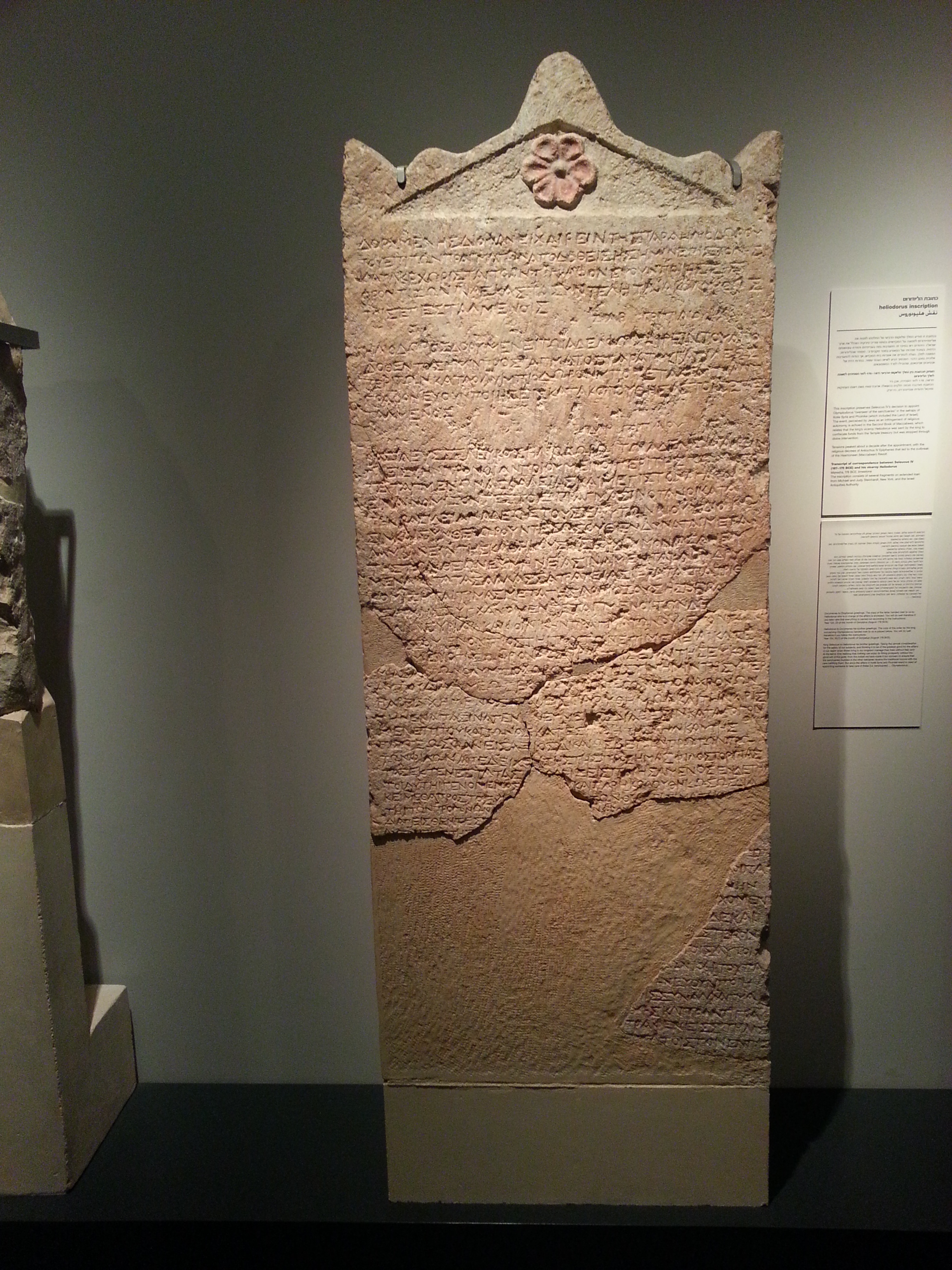
Heliodorus Stele

From 1965, the museum was housed in a series of masonry buildings designed by the Russian-born Israeli architect Alfred Mansfeld. A $100-million campaign to renovate the museum and double its gallery space was completed by Israeli architects Efrat-Kowalsky Architects who renovated the existing buildings in July 2010. The wings for archaeology, the fine arts, and Jewish art and life were completely rebuilt and the original buildings were linked through a new entrance pavilion. The passageways that connect between the buildings and five new pavilions were designed by James Carpenter.

=== Mishkafayim ===
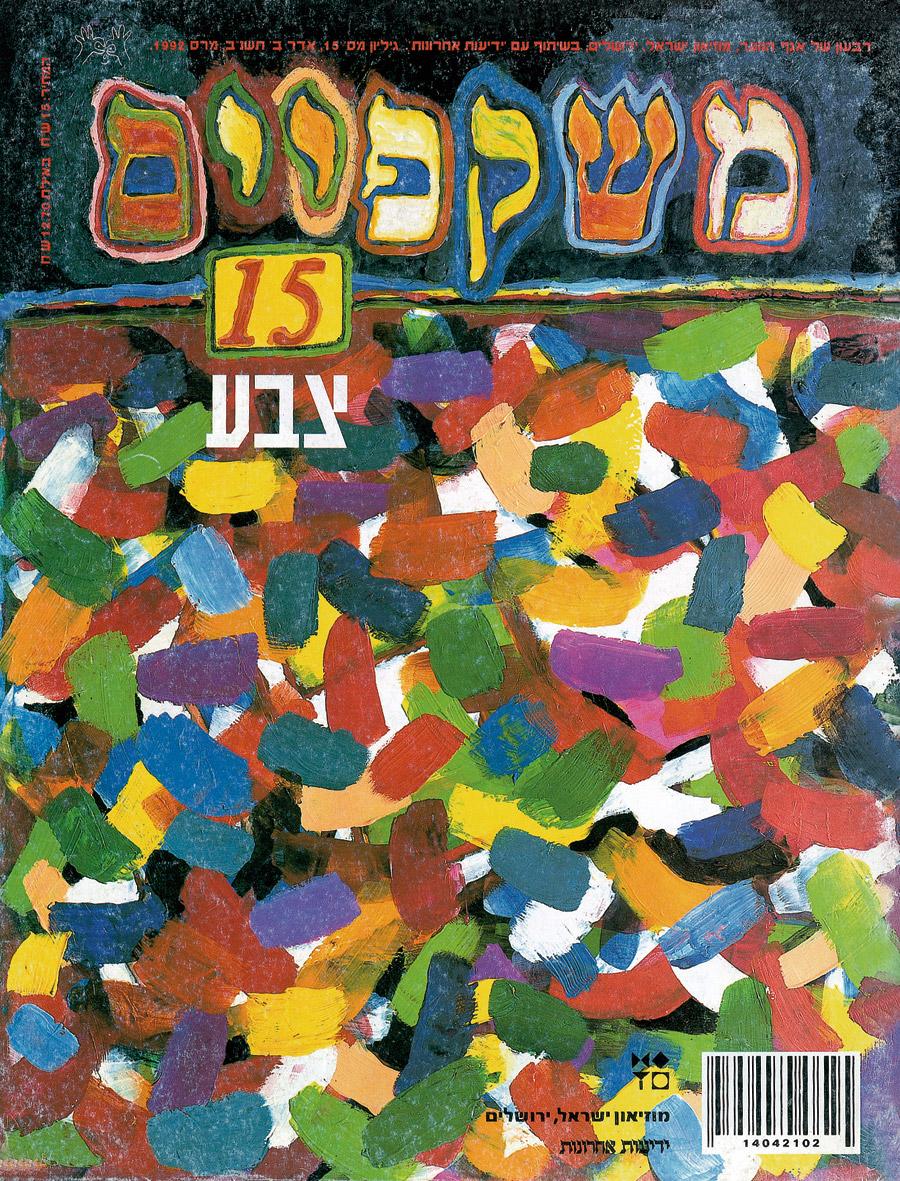
Mishkafayim, issue devoted to color

Mishkafayim (Hebrew for “glasses”) was a Hebrew-language art magazine published by the museum from 1987 to 2001. Tamir Rauner was the founding editor in 1987 and served in this capacity for nine years. For its first two years, Mishkafayim was a joint project of the Israel Museum's youth wing and the weekly magazine, Koteret Rashit (Hebrew for “main headline”). Koteret Rashit closed after the fifth issue of Mishkafayim. As a result, from the sixth issue onward, the daily newspaper Yedioth Ahronoth replaced Koteret Rashit as a partner in the publication of Mishkafayim.

Mishkafayim was an innovative addition to the Israeli cultural scene. It was a multidisciplinary magazine dedicated to culture that combined written and visual content, providing a stage to new and established writers, artists, and illustrators.

In 1994, after Mishkafayim had appeared for seven years, Tamir Rauner launched Einayim, (Hebrew for "eyes"), a children's magazine that was presented as "the younger brother of Mishkafayim", that is, a children's magazine with an outlook similar to that of Mishkafayim. In 1996, after two years of editing both magazines, Tamir Rauner left Mishkafayim and editor Smadar Tirosh replaced him starting with issue 26. Under Tirosh, the magazine's character changed, taking a less innovative approach in content and form and beginning to appeal to a more mature audience. From issue 29 onward, its subtitle changed accordingly, from the "quarterly of the youth wing" to "art quarterly"; similar changes were made in its graphic design, including the design of its name. In 2000, Monica Lavi replaced Smadar Tirosh and the magazine's name was changed to Muza (Hebrew for "muse") which ceased publication in 2001.

Each issue of Mishkafayim was dedicated to a main theme, such as drawing, writing, portraiture, comics, photography, legend, light, games, packaging, chair, material, illustration, artists, nature, movement, childhood, love, politics, time, sex and art, heroes, forgery, language, madness, dreams, maps, television, food, earth, and stone. In some cases, the theme of the magazine was chosen in coordination with exhibitions at the Israel Museum Youth Wing, such as "Earth".

== Archaeology Wing ==
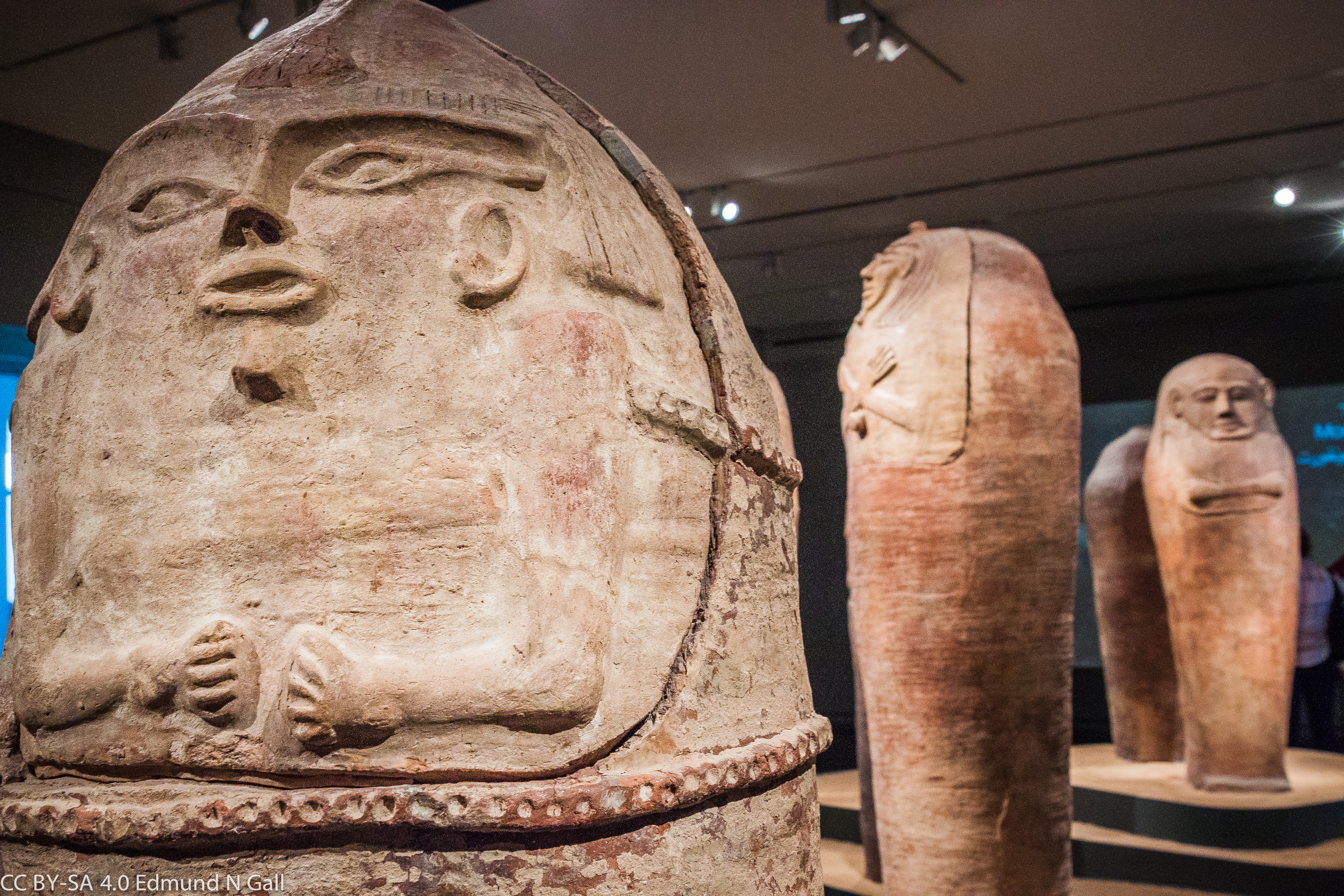
Canaanite anthropoid sarcophagi found in Deir al-Balah in the Gaza Strip.

The Samuel and Saidye Bronfman Archaeology Wing tells the story of the ancient Land of Israel, home to peoples of different cultures and faiths, using unique examples from the museum's collection of Holy Land archaeology, the foremost holding in the world. Organized chronologically, from prehistory through the Ottoman Empire, the transformed wing presents seven "chapters" of this archaeological narrative, weaving together momentous historical events, cultural achievements, and technological advances, while providing a glimpse into the everyday lives of the peoples of the region. This narrative is supplemented by thematic groupings highlighting aspects of ancient Israeli archaeology that are unique to the region's history, among them Hebrew writing, glass, and coins. Treasures from neighboring cultures that have had a decisive impact on the Land of Israel – such as Egypt, the Near East, Greece and Italy, and the Islamic world – are on view in adjacent and connecting galleries. A special gallery at the entrance to the wing showcases new findings and other temporary exhibition displays.

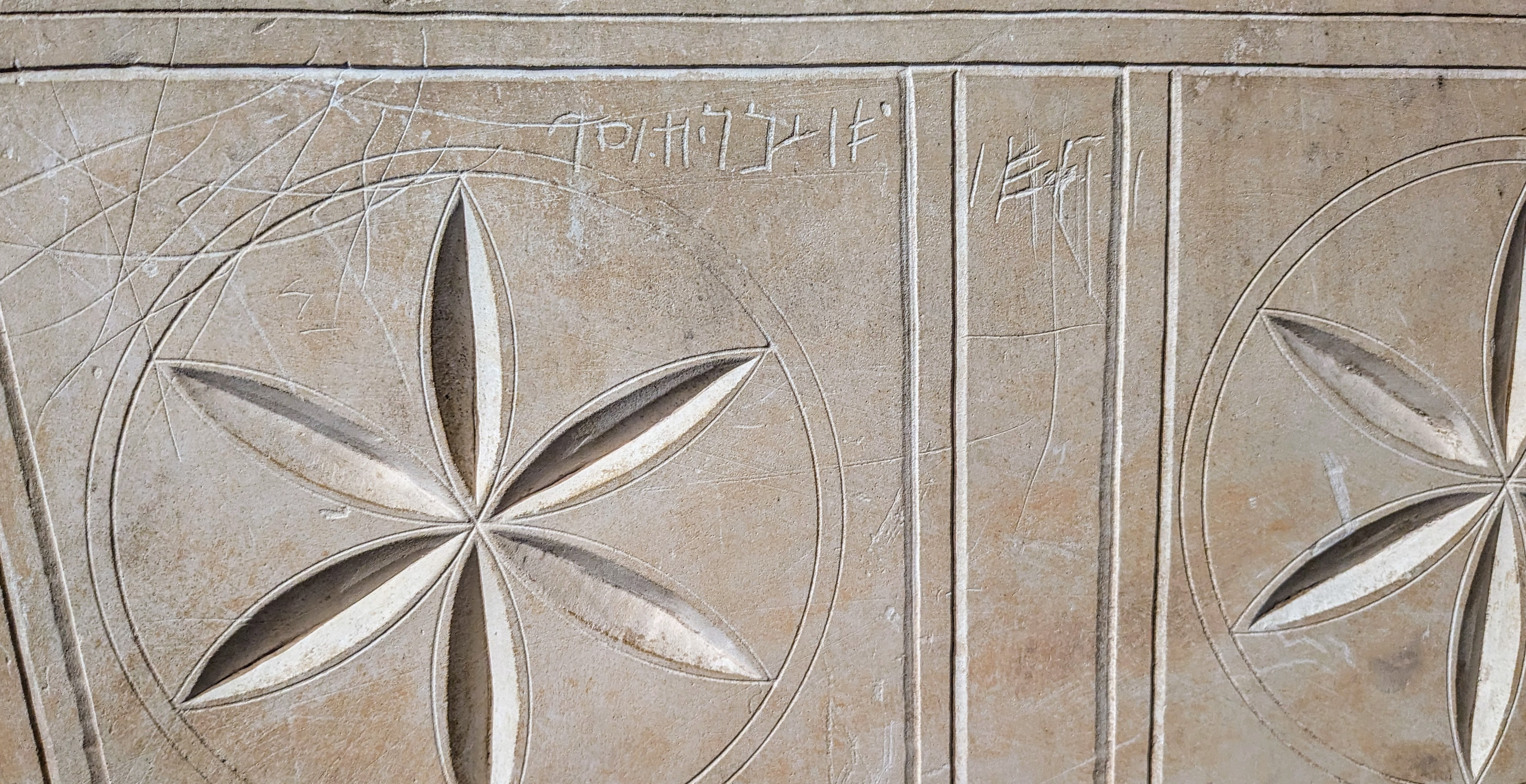
Ossuary of Jesus son of Joseph

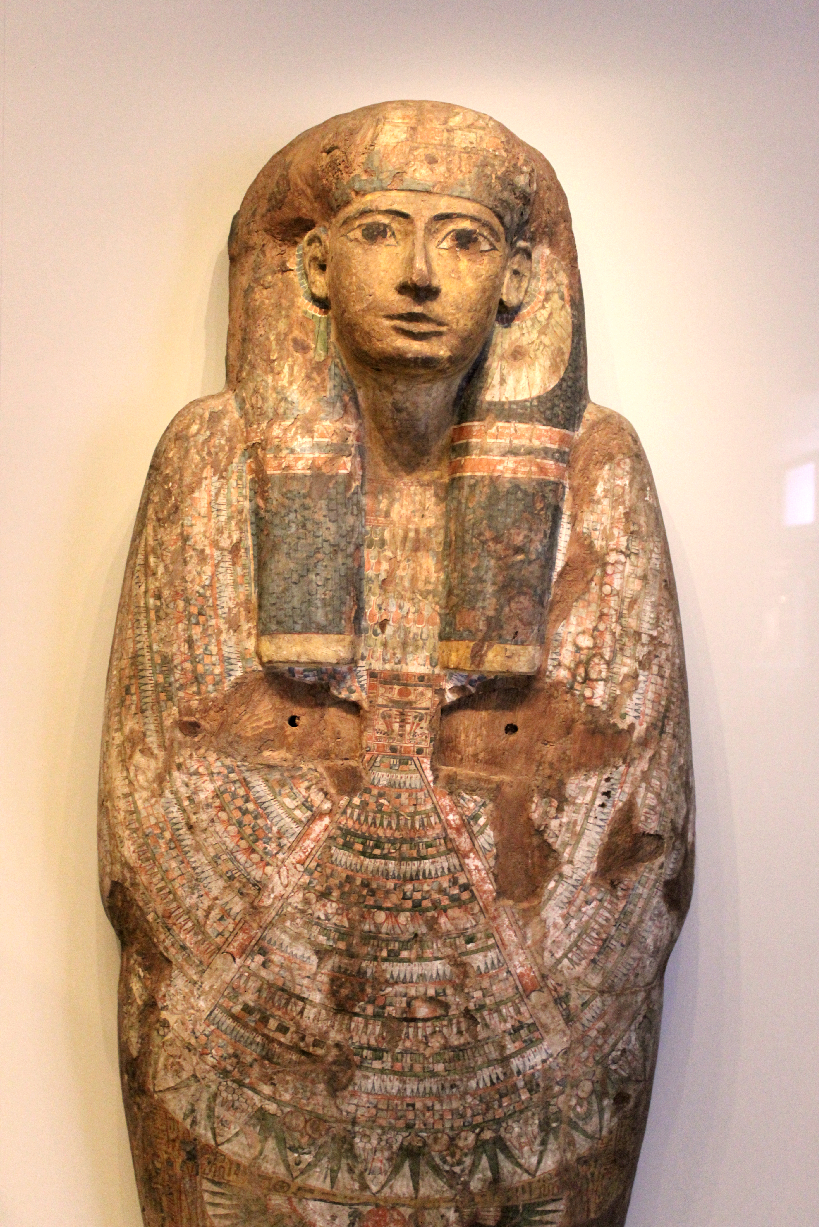
Elaborate wooden burial coffin, housed in the Israel Museum

Highlights on view include Pilate Stone, "House of David" inscription (9th century BCE), a comparative display of two shrines (8th–7th century BCE); the Heliodorus Stele (178 BCE), royal Herodian bathhouse (1st century BCE); the Uzziah tablet and the Ossuary of Jesus son of Joseph (1st century CE); Hadrian's Triumph: inscription from a triumphal arch (136 CE), the Mosaic of Rehob (3rd century CE) and gold-glass bases from the Roman catacombs (4th century CE).

== Administration ==
Karl Katz was the founding curator of the Israel Museum. James Snyder was appointed museum director in 1997, serving in this position for twenty years. During this period, the museum grew, including a $100 million expansion and renewal of the institution. Annual attendance doubled to over 800,000 visitors a year during his tenure.

On October 25, 2017, Ido Bruno, a professor of industrial design at the Bezalel Academy of Arts and Design, was appointed director of the Israel Museum, succeeding James S. Snyder. Bruno assumed the position in November 2017. He was succeeded by Denis Weil, former dean of the Institute of Design at the Illinois Institute of Technology, who served as director from 2022 to 2023. In September 2023, Suzanne Landau, former director of the Tel Aviv Museum of Art, became interim director of the Israel Museum, serving until February 2026. On March 1, 2026, Jacob (Yasha) Grobman, a professor of architecture and former dean of the Technion's Faculty of Architecture and Town Planning (2019–2022), assumed the position of director of the museum.

=== Funding ===
The Israel Museum receives only 10–12% of its operating budget from state and municipal sources. The Israeli government provides varying amounts of funds each year. The institution must raise 88% of its yearly operating budget, all of its $200 million endowment and $100 million for its recent capital project, while paying 17.5% VAT as well as real-estate taxes on the campus property.

The most active of the international support groups of the museum, the American Friends of the Israel Museum, raised $270 million in cash, of which $47 million is in endowment funds, and donated $210 million in the art from 1972 to 2008. In 2009, the Israel Museum received $12 million from the Edmond J. Safra Philanthropic Foundation, towards the renovation, reinstallation, and endowment of its fine arts wing, which will be renamed after Edmond and Lily Safra.

== Shrine of the Book ==
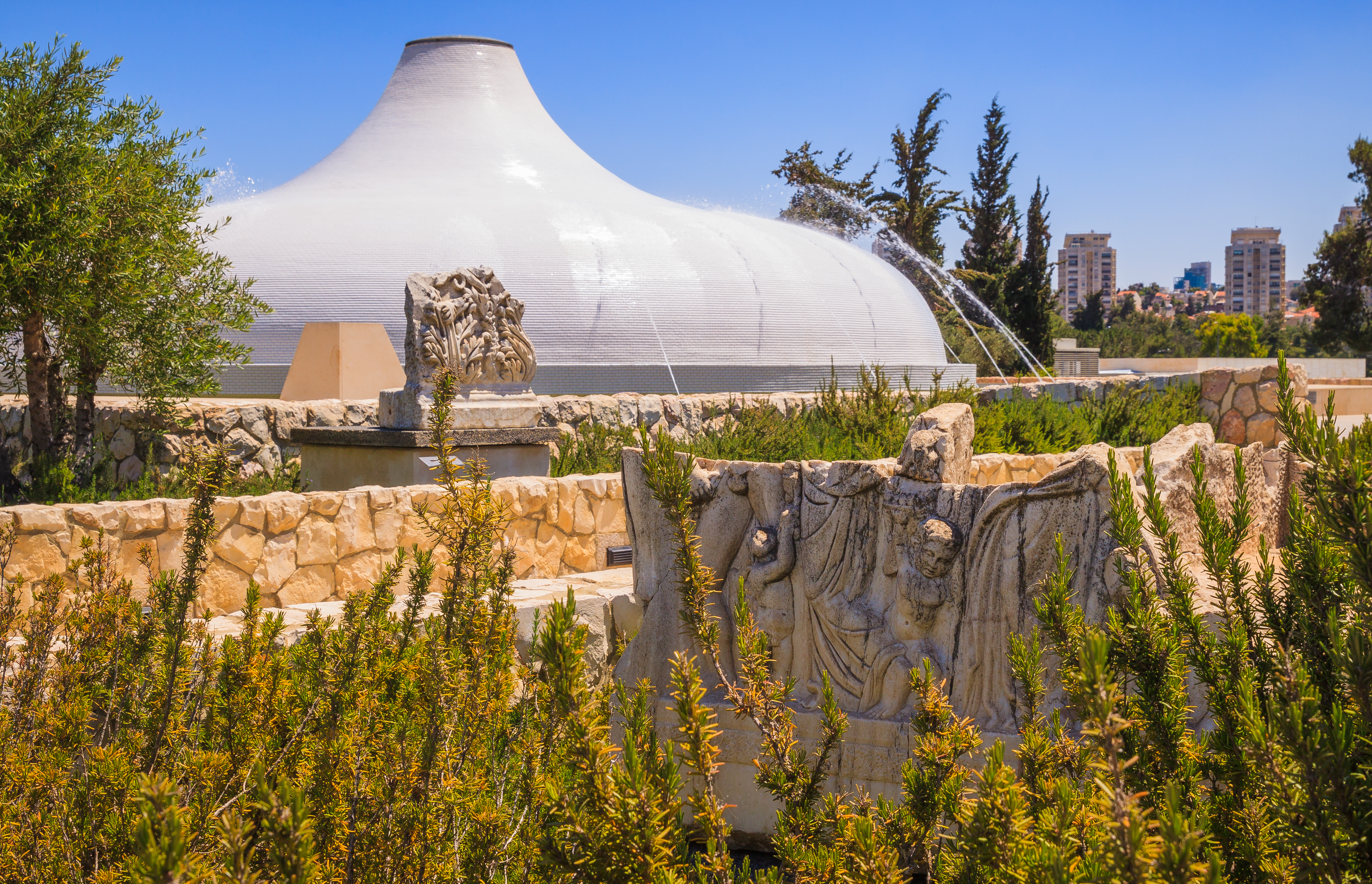
Shrine of the Book

The Shrine of the Book houses the Dead Sea Scrolls, the oldest biblical manuscripts in the world, as well as rare early medieval biblical manuscripts. The scrolls were discovered in 1947–56 in 11 caves in and around the site of Qumran. An elaborate planning process of seven years led to the building's eventual construction in 1965. This was funded by the family of David Samuel Gottesman, a Hungarian émigré, the philanthropist who had purchased the scrolls as a gift to the State of Israel.

The building consists of a white dome over a building located two-thirds below the ground. The dome is reflected in a pool of water that surrounds it. Across from the white dome is a black basalt wall. The colors and shapes of the building are based on the imagery of the scroll of the War of the Sons of Light Against the Sons of Darkness; the white dome symbolizes the Sons of Light and the black wall symbolizes the Sons of Darkness. The interior of the shrine was designed to depict the environment in which the scrolls were found. There is also a permanent display on life in the Qumran, where the scrolls were written. The entire structure was designed to resemble a pot in which the scrolls were found. The shrine was designed by Armand Bartos and Frederick Kiesler, and was opened in 1965.

As the fragility of the scrolls makes it impossible to display them all on a continuous basis, a system of rotation is used. After a scroll has been exhibited for 3–6 months, it is removed from its showcase and placed temporarily in a special storeroom, where it "rests" from exposure. The museum also holds other rare ancient manuscripts and displays the Aleppo Codex, which is from the 10th century and is believed to be the oldest Bible codex in Hebrew.

== Second Temple model ==
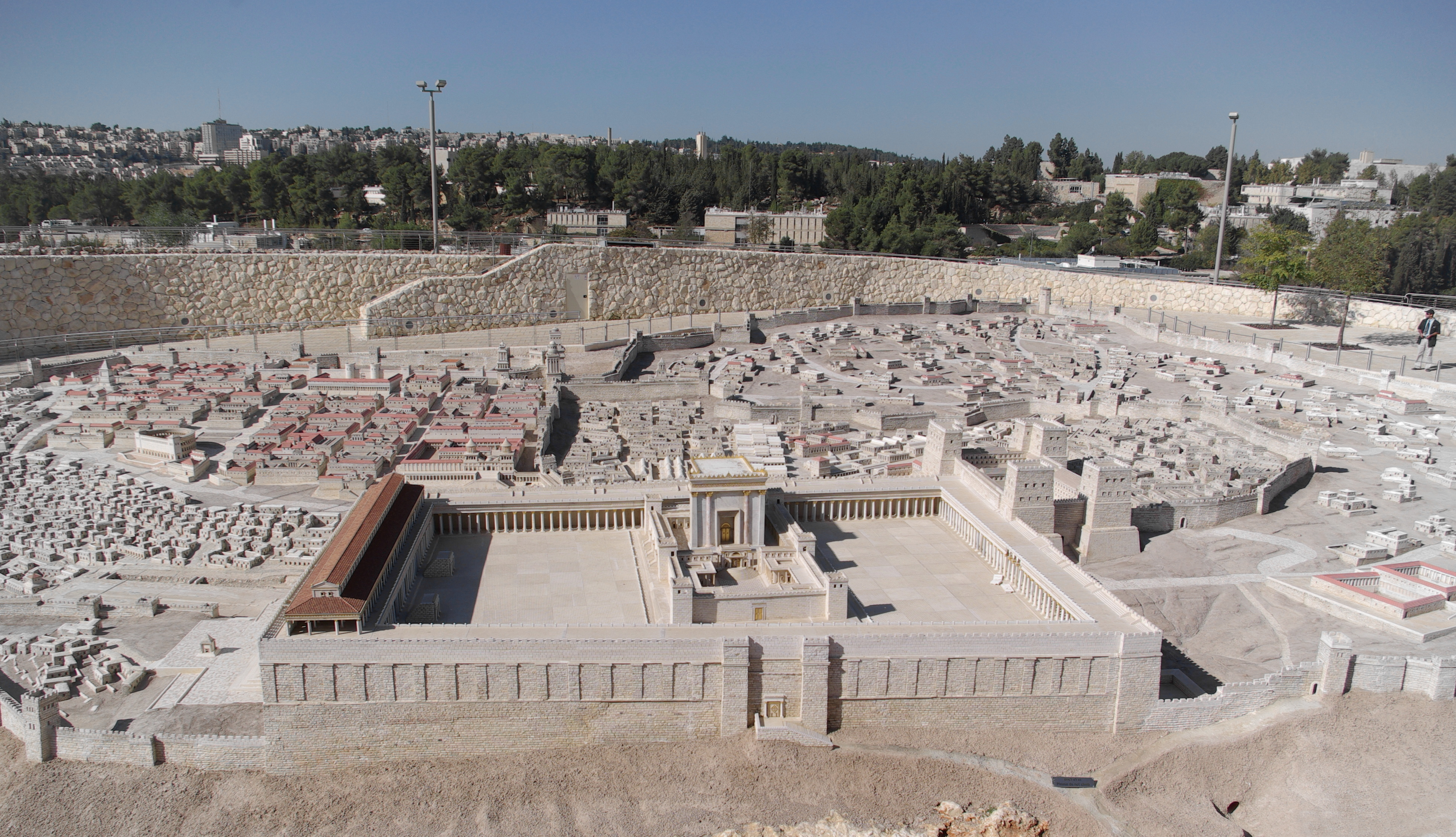
Second Temple model at Israel Museum

Adjacent to the Shrine of the Book is the Model of Jerusalem in the Second Temple Period, which reconstructs the topography and architectural character of the city as it was prior to its destruction by the Romans in 70 CE and provides historical context to the Shrine's presentation of the Dead Sea Scrolls. Originally constructed on the grounds of Jerusalem's Holyland Hotel, the model, which includes a replica of Herod's Temple, is now a permanent feature of the museum's 20-acre (81,000 m^{2}) campus.

== Fine Arts Wing ==
The Edmond and Lily Safra Fine Arts Wing reflects the wide-ranging, interdisciplinary nature of the museum's collections, encompassing works of art from across the ages in Western and non-Western cultures. The wing has been reorganized to highlight connections among works from its diverse curatorial collections, which include European Art, Modern Art, Contemporary Art, Israeli Art, the Arts of Africa, Oceania, and the Americas, Asian Art, Photography, Design and Architecture and Prints and Drawings. Installations are organized to underscore visual affinities and shared themes and to inspire new insight into the arts of different times and places, as well as an appreciation of the common threads of human culture. The reconfigured wing includes the museum's first permanent galleries for Israeli art, more than doubled gallery space for the museum's extensive collections in modern art, providing meaningful connecting points between Western and non-Western holdings, and a full 2,200-square-meter (7,200-square-foot) gallery floor devoted to changing displays from the museum's collection of contemporary art.

Highlights newly on view include The Noel and Harriette Levine Photography Collection, The Jacques Lipchitz Collection, Gustave Courbet, Jura Landscape with Shepherd and Donkey (c. 1866), Alberto Giacometti, Alfred Barye, Diego in the Studio (1952), Ohad Meromi, and The Boy from South Tel Aviv (2001).

=== European, Modern, and Israeli art ===
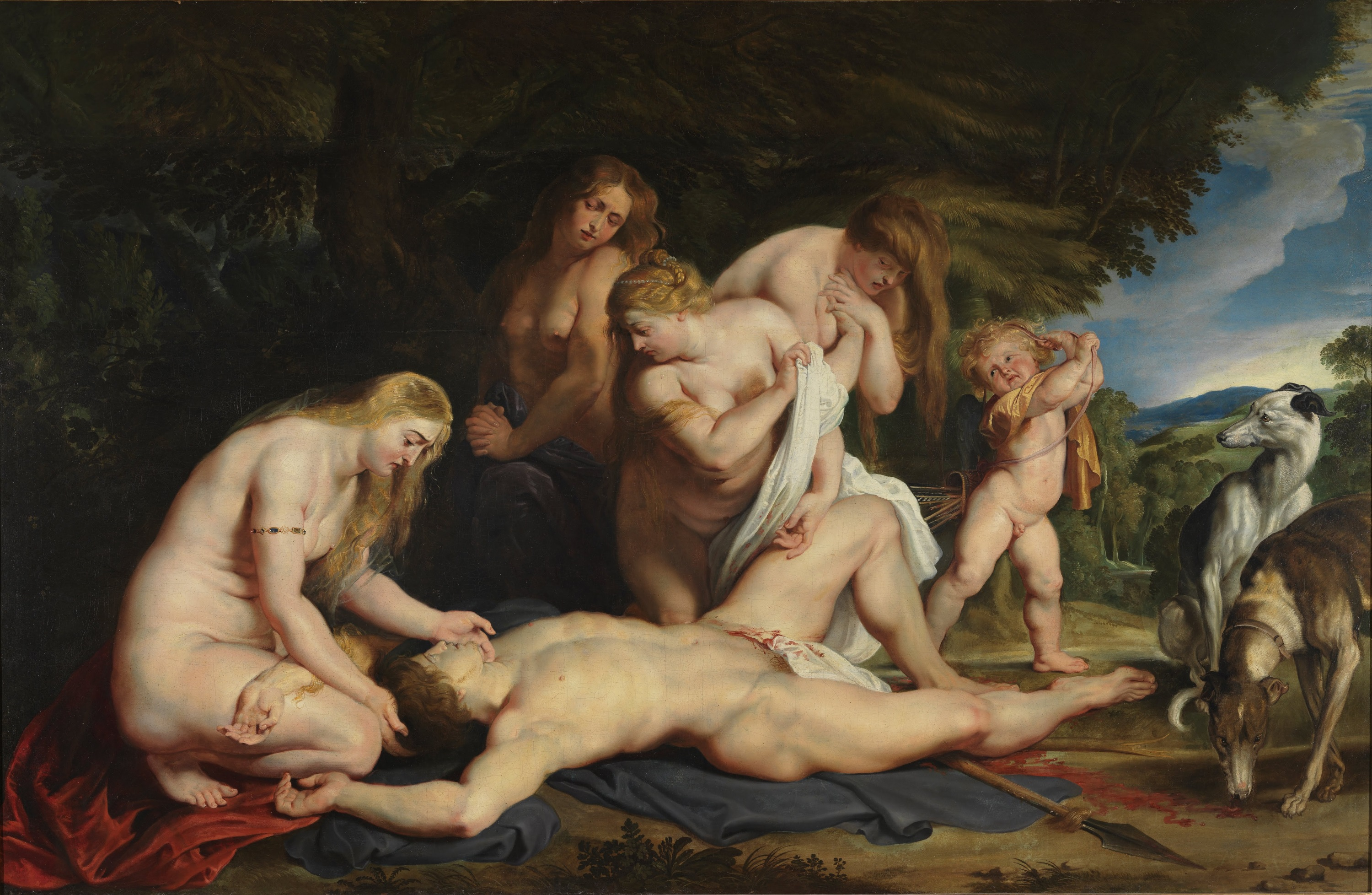
The Death of Adonis, c. 1614 by Peter Paul Rubens

The Israel Museum holds a large collection of paintings representing a wide range of periods, styles, subjects, and regions of origin. Painters in the collection include such international figures as Rembrandt and Camille Pissarro as well as such Israeli and Jewish artists as Marc Chagall, Abel Pann, and Reuven Rubin.

The Israel Museum's commitment to Israeli art is central to its mission. As the country's national museum, it plays a major role in preserving Israel's artistic heritage by collecting works by Israeli artists – in Israel and abroad – and by encouraging Israel's artists to develop in their careers. The museum's Israeli Art collection spans the late 19th century through today, and it reflects the evolution of Israel's cultural history in the visual arts. The Information Center for Israeli Art provides scholars and the public with comprehensive archival information on several thousand Israeli artists, including biographical notes, press materials, videos, photographs, and other forms of documentation.

== Mandel Wing for Jewish Art and Life ==
The holdings of the Jack, Joseph, and Morton Mandel Wing for Jewish Art and Life represent the religious and secular material culture of Jewish communities worldwide, spanning centuries from the Middle Ages to the present day. The collection reflects the depth and beauty of Jewish heritage and creativity as well as the aesthetic and stylistic influences of other cultures in places where Jews lived.

The origins of the collection can be traced to the early twentieth century with the establishment of the Bezalel National Museum under the directorship of Mordechai Narkiss, who expanded significantly the collection of ritual art objects through important treasures rescued between the two world wars and after the Holocaust. Later on, this treasure was integrated in the newly established Israel Museum in 1965 into the departments of Jewish Art and of Jewish Ethnography. In 1995 they were united into a new independent wing. Over the years, the wing's holdings have been strengthened through gifts and acquisitions of individual objects, gifts of private collections, and fieldwork within communities in Israel and abroad. The wing's prominent collections are the Stieglitz Collection and the Feuchtwanger Collection for Jewish ritual objects, Torah scroll ornaments, and life cycle objects, as well as the Schulmann Collection and Rathjens Collection for North African and Yemenite material culture, dress, jewelry and ritual objects.

The wing's collection contains many unique treasures, among them, are rare manuscripts, four reconstructed synagogue interiors, a wide variety of ceremonial and ritual objects, as well as diverse material culture including dress, jewelry, and everyday artifacts.

In the new permanent display, objects drawn from this extensive collection from the public and the private realm, are integrated into a multifaceted narrative. This comparative display explores the objects' history and the social context in which they were used while underscoring their aesthetic qualities and emotional resonance. It reflects a vivid cultural tapestry weaving together the individual and the communal, the sacred and the mundane, the heritage of the past and the creative innovations of the present.

Five principal themes unfold as you walk through the galleries:

- The Rhythm of Life: Birth, Marriage, Death – highlighting the coexistence of joy and sadness, life, and death, memory and hope at each of these junctures in the life cycle.
- Illuminating the Script – a display from our collection of rare medieval and Renaissance Hebrew manuscripts, shedding light on their history and revealing their artistry.
- The Synagogue Route: Holiness and Beauty – Four restored interiors of synagogues from Europe, Asia, and the Americas, along with Torah scroll ornaments, show the unity and diversity of Jewish religious architecture and ritual objects.
- The Cycle of the Jewish Year – The sanctity of the Sabbath and the traditional celebration of religious holidays, as well as the new commemoration of special days in the State of Israel, have given rise to a wealth of finely crafted objects and imaginative artworks.
- Costume and Jewelry: A Matter of Identity – Environment, custom, and religious law all play their role in creating the rich variety of Jewish dress and jewelry from East and West presented here.

=== Isidore and Anne Falk Information Center for Jewish Art and Life ===
The Information Center has a research library and a constantly growing archival collection of some twenty thousand photographs documenting the daily life of Jewish communities around the world. The collection includes images of synagogues, cemeteries and ceremonial objects, some no longer extant.

The information center offers access to resources of the collections as well as virtual tours in former exhibitions in order to broaden and deepen knowledge behind the objects in the wing's collections.

== Art Garden ==
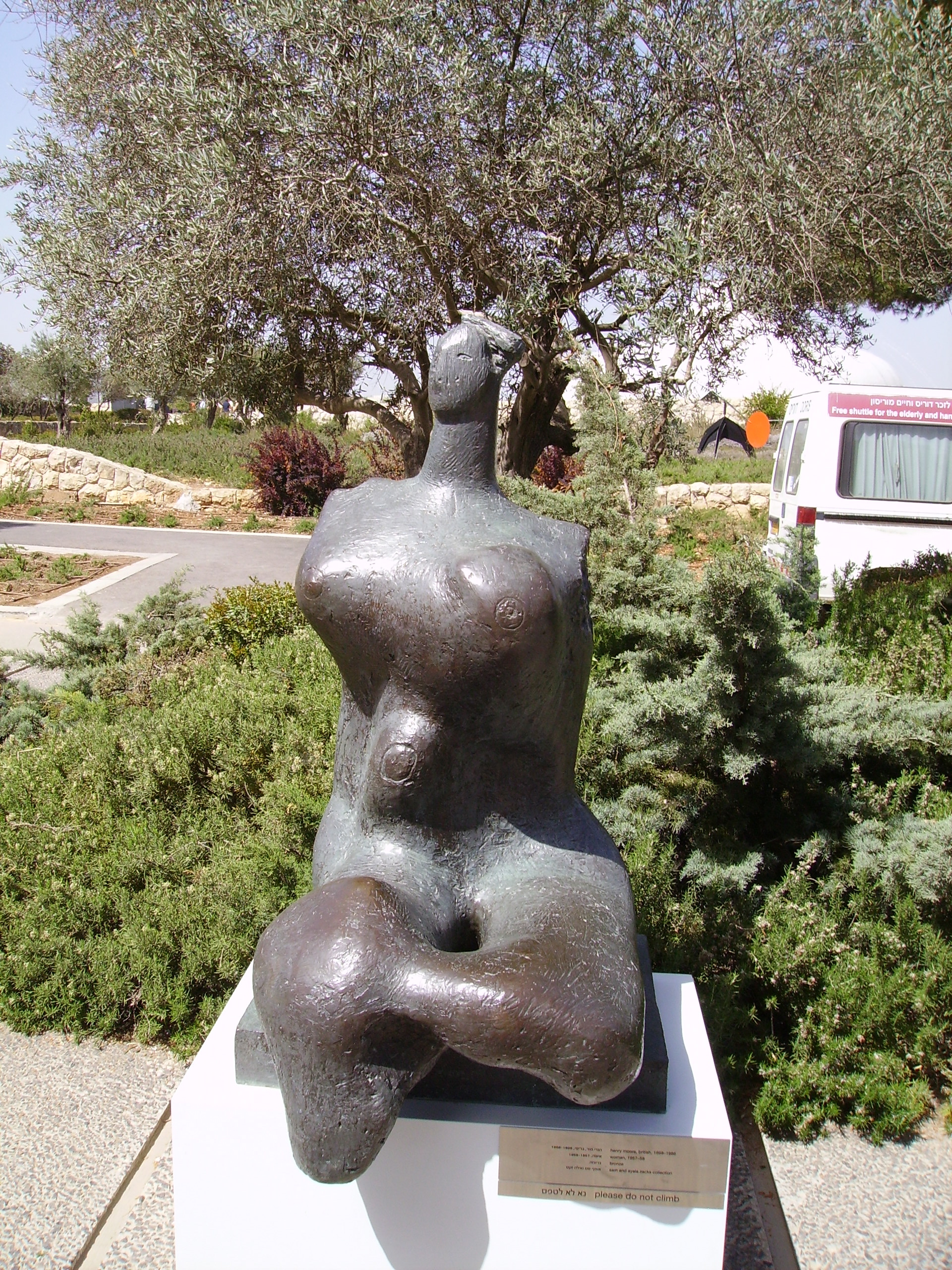
Henry Moore's A Woman

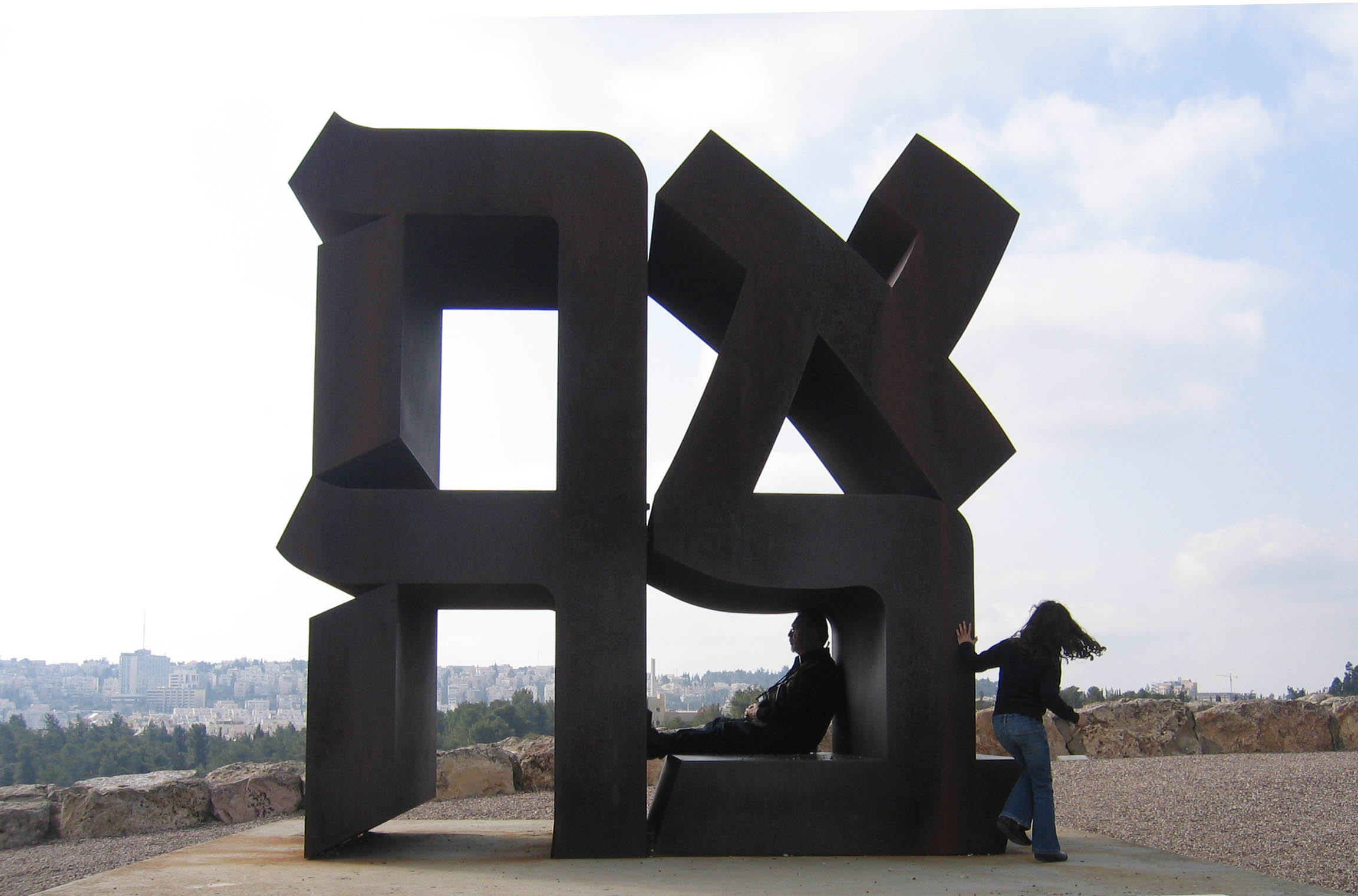
Robert Indiana's Love sculpture

The Billy Rose Art Garden is a 20-dunam garden featuring modern and abstract sculptures. The garden, designed for the original campus by Japanese American sculptor Isamu Noguchi, is counted among the finest outdoor sculpture settings of the 20th century. An Oriental landscape combined with an ancient Jerusalem hillside; the garden serves as the backdrop for the Israel Museum's display of the evolution of the modern western sculptural tradition. On view are works by modern masters including Jacques Lipchitz, Henry Moore, Claes Oldenburg, Pablo Picasso, Auguste Rodin, and David Smith, together with more recent site-specific commissions by such artists as Magdalena Abakanowicz, Mark Dion, James Turrell, and Micha Ullman.

== Youth Wing ==
The Ruth Youth Wing for Art Education was opened in 1966. It is unique in its size and scope of activities, presents a wide range of programming to more than 100,000 schoolchildren each year, and features exhibition galleries, art studios, classrooms, a library of illustrated children's books, and a recycling room. Special programs foster intercultural understanding between Arab and Jewish students and reach out to the wide spectrum of Israel's communities. The wing combines annual original artworks of Israeli and international artists, with educational activities. There are also a variety of workshops for children and adults.

== Rockefeller Archaeological Museum and the Ticho House ==
In addition to the extensive programming offered on its main campus, the Israel Museum also operates two off-site locations: the Rockefeller Archaeological Museum that opened in 1938 for the display of artifacts unearthed mainly in the excavations conducted in Mandatory Palestine, in the 1920s and 1930s; and Ticho House, which offers an ongoing program of exhibitions by younger Israeli artists in a historic house and garden setting.

== Prizes awarded by the museum ==
Among the prizes awarded by the museum is the Jesselson Prize for Contemporary Judaica Design, which recognizes outstanding design of Jewish ritual objects. Winners include Moshe Zabari (1990).

== Incidents ==
On 5 October 2023, a 40-year-old Jewish-American tourist was arrested at the museum after hurling a marble head of the Greek goddess Athena and a statue of a griffin grasping the wheel of fate of the Roman god Nemesis into the floor, shattering the latter artefact. Police described him as a radical who considered the artefacts "to be idolatrous and contrary to the Torah", while his lawyer claimed he was suffering from Jerusalem syndrome. The damaged artefacts, both of which dated from the second century CE, were placed under restoration.

== Gallery ==
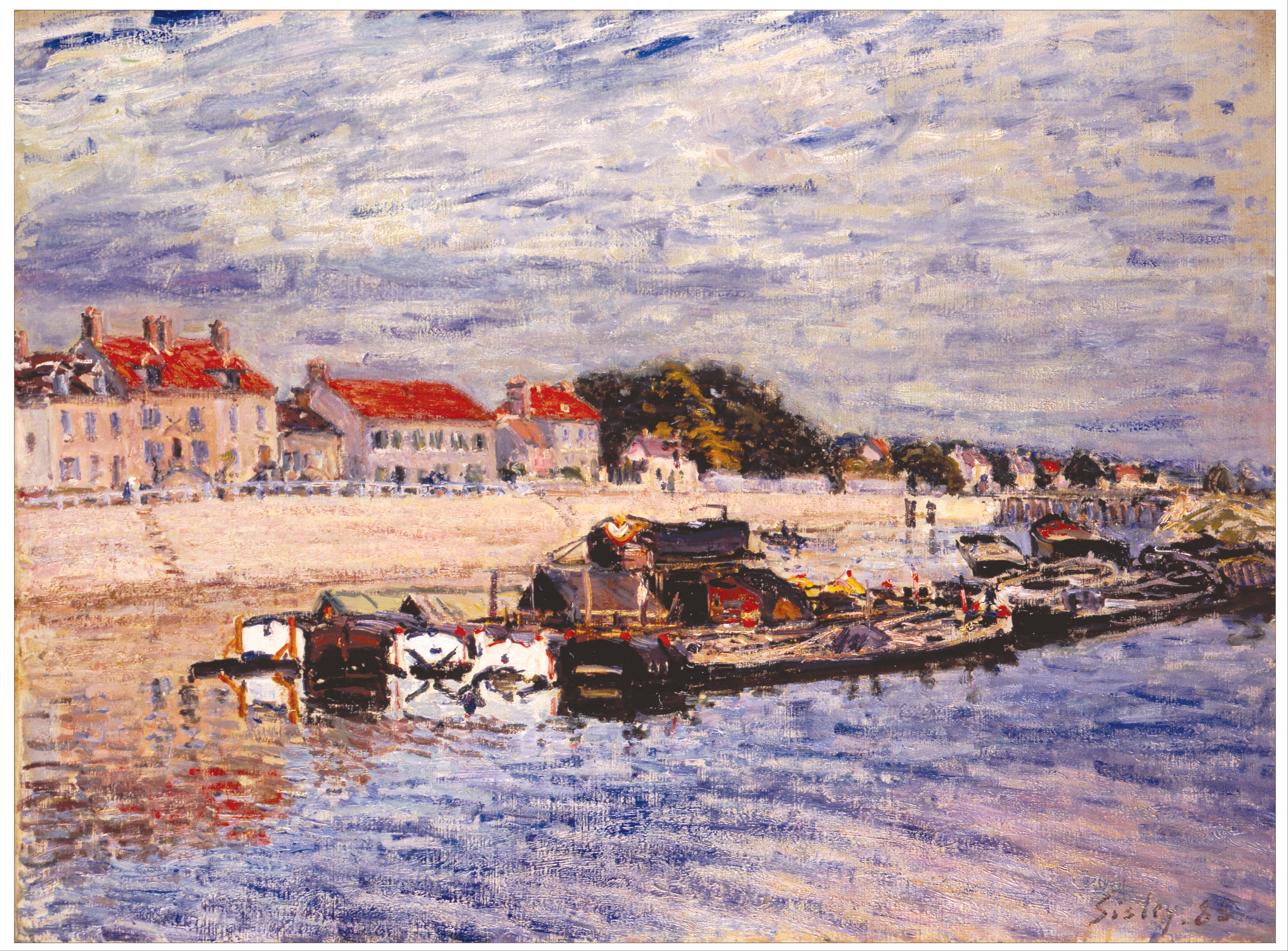
Alfred Sisley

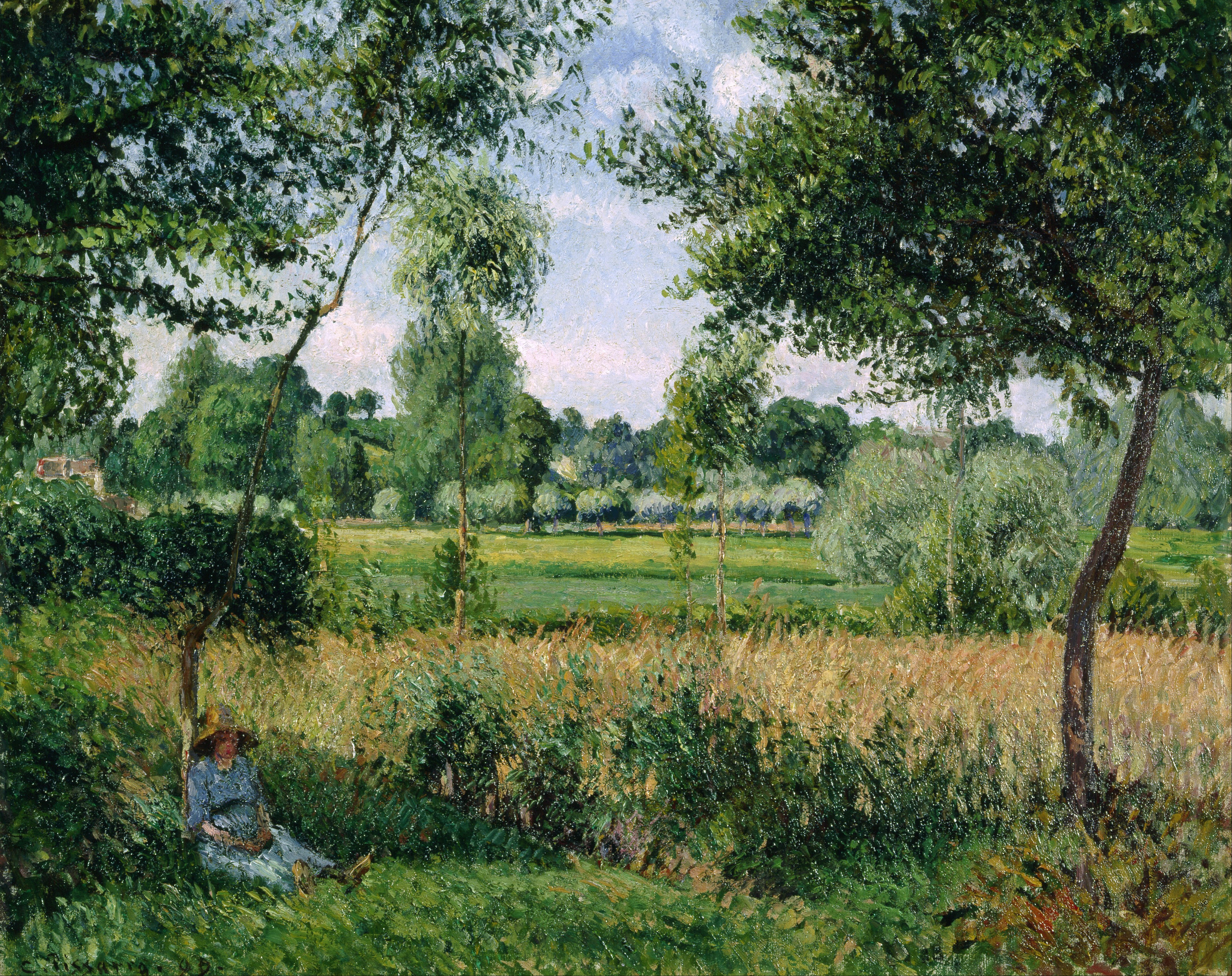
Camille Pissarro

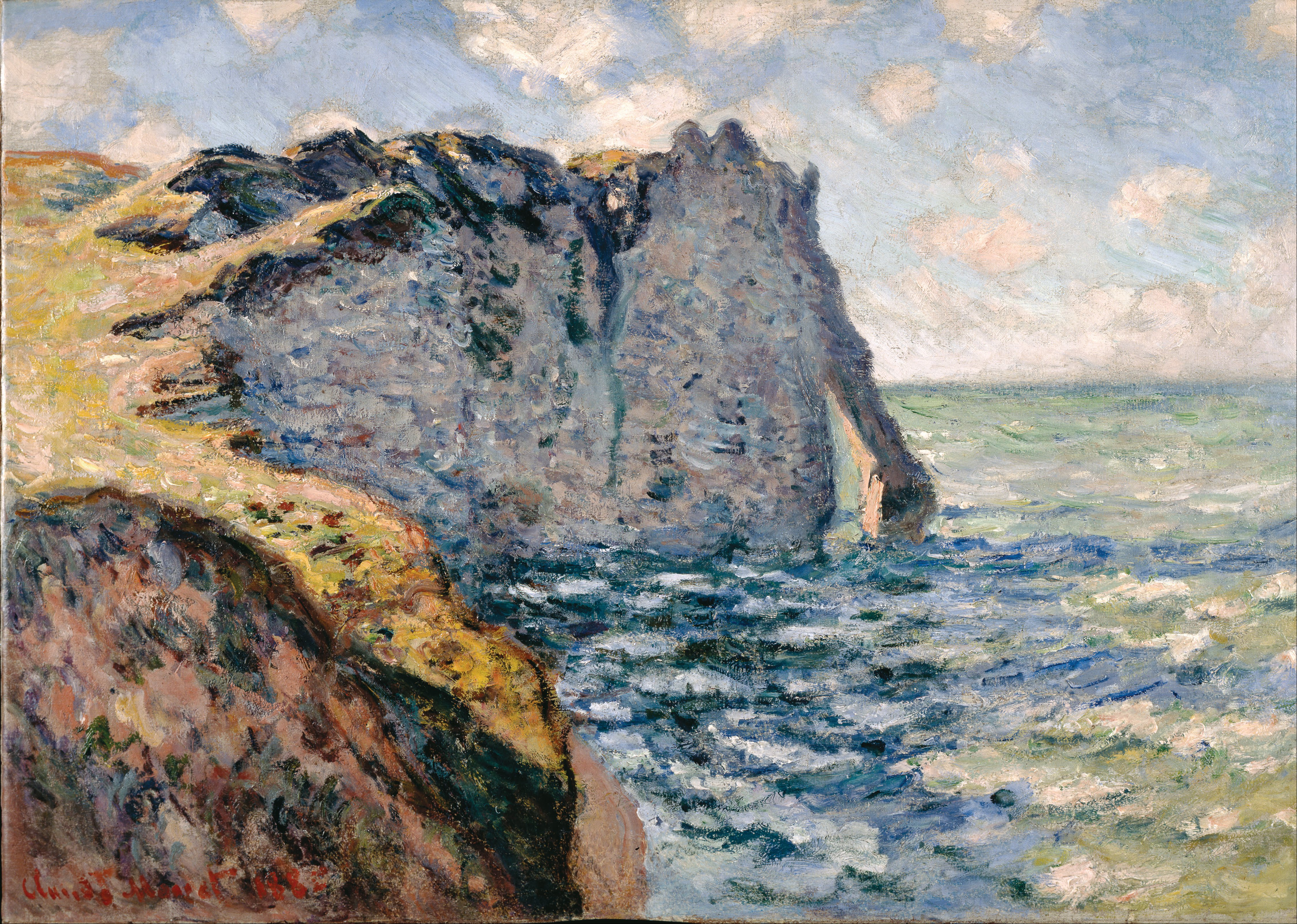
Claude Monet

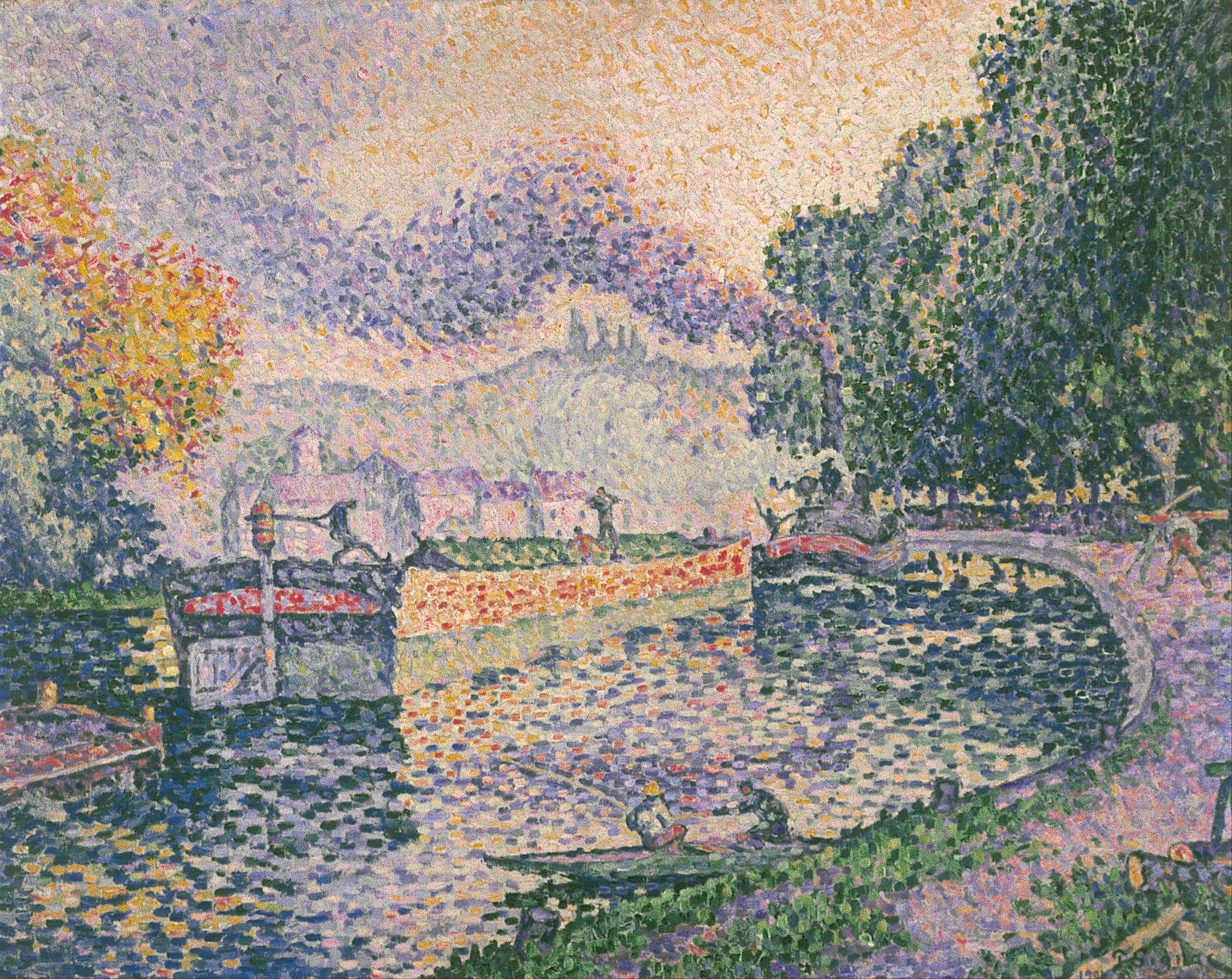
Paul Signac

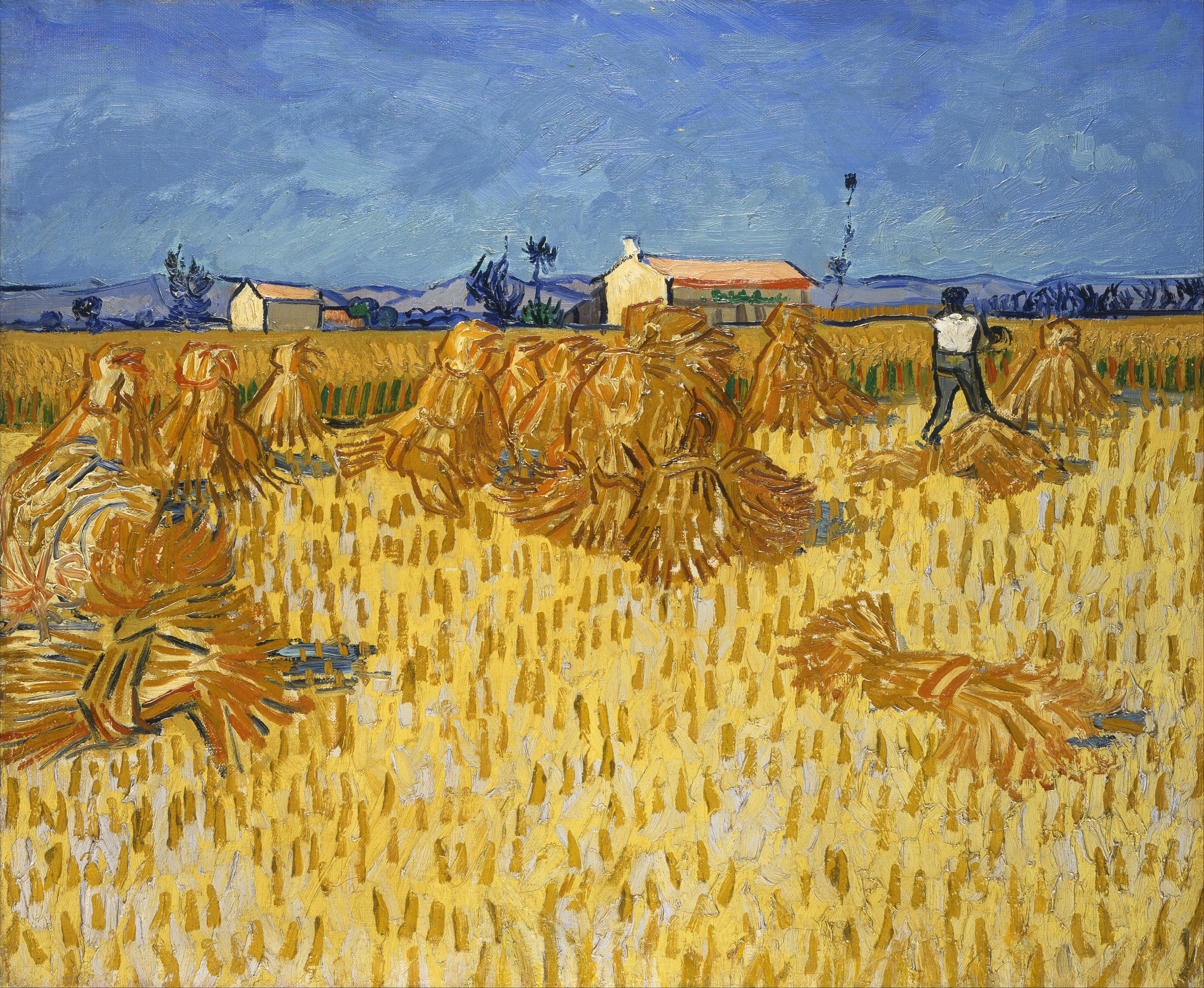
Vincent Van Gogh

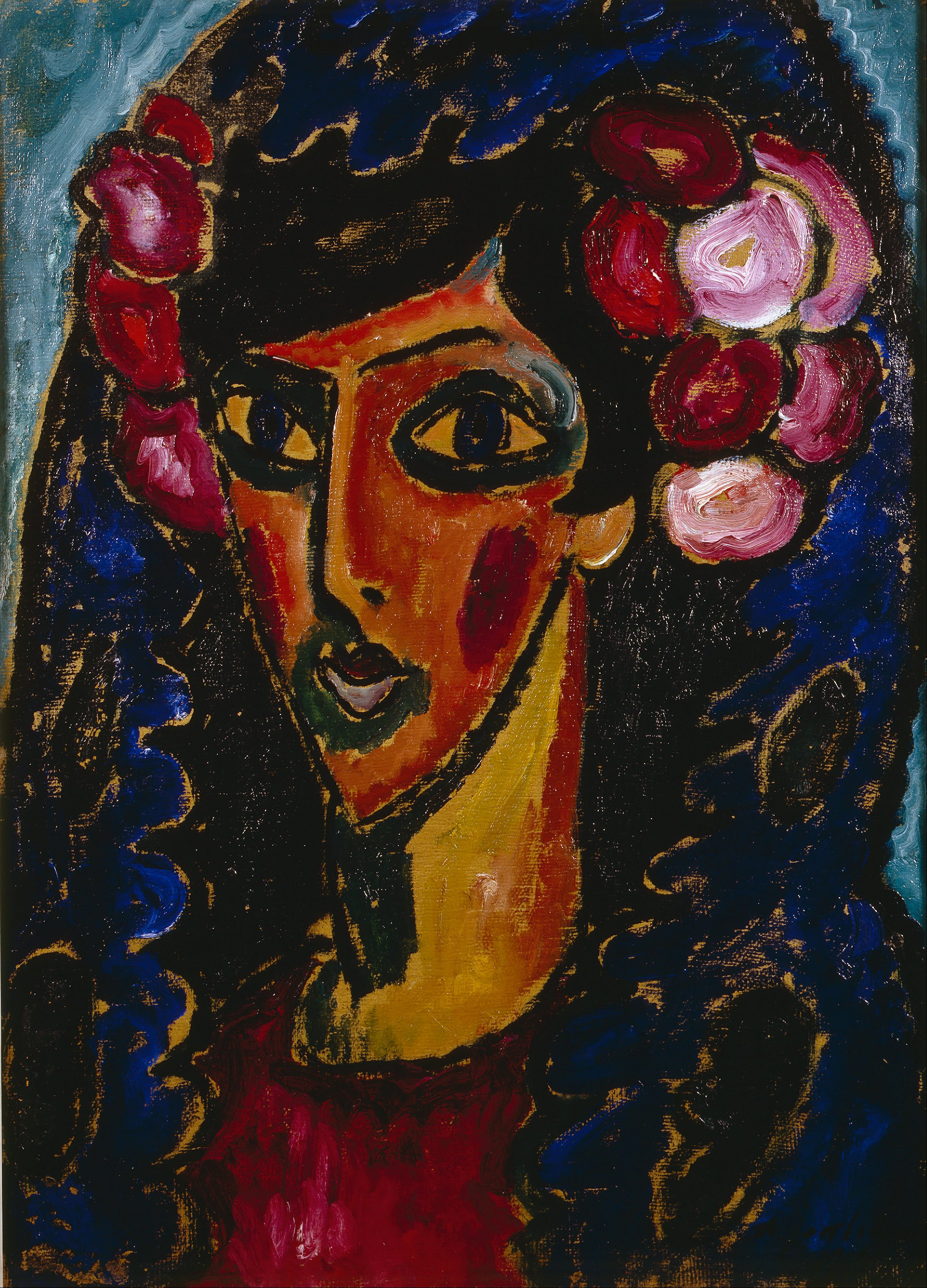
Alexej von Jawlensky

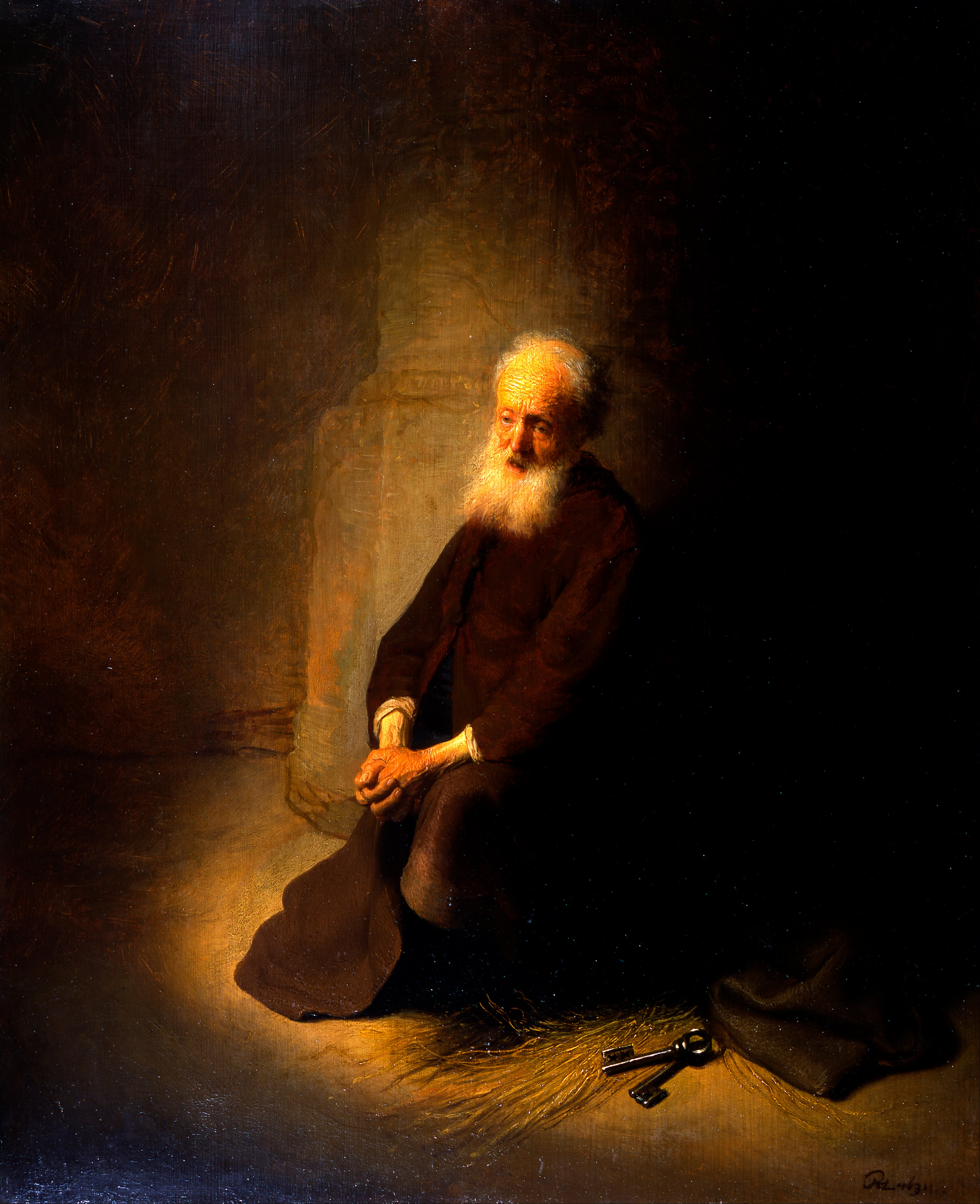
Rembrandt van Rijn

== Notable staff ==
- Elisheva Cohen
- Haim Gitler
- Dov Gottesman
- Susan Hazan
- Adina Kamien
- Nissan N. Perez
- James S. Snyder
- Yigal Zalmona

== See also ==
- Bible Lands Museum – an archaeology museum also located in Jerusalem's Museum Row
- National Library of Israel – library dedicated to collecting the cultural treasures of Israel and of Jewish heritage, located nearby
- Eretz Israel Museum – history and art museum in Tel Aviv
- List of largest art museums
- Visual arts in Israel
