= Einayim =

Hebrew children's magazine

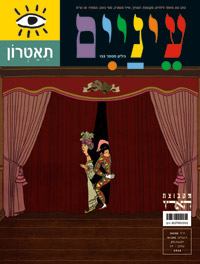
Einayim's issue about theatre, cover page

Einayim (Hebrew: עיניים, meaning “eyes”) is a Hebrew children's magazine edited by Tamir Rauner.

== History and profile ==
The first issue, whose theme was paper, was published in November 1994 as a “younger brother” to the Mishkafayim magazine. The magazine's first three issues were published in cooperation with the youth wing of the Israel Museum, Jerusalem, after which the publisher, Rauner, partnered with the Haaretz Group to publish the magazine.

A 64-page magazine with high-quality visuals and texts, Einayim features many photographs, drawings, and illustrations. Each issue is devoted to a theme, such as water, air, or mirror. The magazine also has regular columns. The texts in the magazine are partially vowelized.

Several books have been published based on columns in the magazine. Maniera the Witch features all of the stories that Ronit Heyd wrote about a witch named Maniera between 1994 and 2002. Pand is an anthology of all the comic strips about Pand the Red that appeared between 1994 and 2006 and were written by Tamir Rauner and drawn by Noam Nadav.

Einayim has a special binder that is designed to preserve the issues of the magazine and prevent them from getting torn or lost.

== I Have a Riddle ==
Several riddles are published in every issue. They sometimes include a riddle on the content of the magazine or the page numbers. Usually only four riddles about the issue's theme are published. The subsequent issue contains the answers to the riddles and the names of the children who won prizes for solving them correctly. This column has appeared since the first issue, whose theme was paper, was published in November 1994.

== The World through My Eyes ==
Iris Baum-Ronen, Nira, Neil Menussi, and Naftali Israeli answer personal questions that children ask them. This column also features poems that children wrote on the issue's theme (for example, “Disorder,” a poem on disorder). The questions are not necessarily about the issue's theme. This column first appeared in May 1995 in the second issue of the magazine, whose theme was color.

== The Unfinished Comic Strip ==
This column first appeared in March 1998 in issue 11, which was dedicated to comics. It is the work of Michel Kichka. Each issue features endings for the comic that appeared in the previous issue. This column is always published at the end of the magazine.

== The Unfinished Story ==
This column first appeared in 2003. Shay Golden and Amit Weisberger write a story, and the children are invited to complete it. Five of the endings that children submit are published in the subsequent issue.

== Draw Me a Picture ==
This column first appeared in June 2005 in the issue whose theme was spring. The artist (Talja Keinan) describes a picture (for example, when the theme was law, the artist described a courtroom), and the readers are requested to draw and submit it. A selection of the submissions are published with comments by the artist in the following issue.

== My Photograph ==
This column first appeared in August 2005 in issue 60, whose theme was red. Children take photographs of the issue's theme. In addition, Tzur Kotzer offers his personal opinion of the photographs and explains what to photograph for the next issue.

== Tom and Moby (Brainpop) ==
This column first appeared in issue 69, which was dedicated to shadow and published in May 2006. The column does not appear in the printed version of the magazine, which only publishes a link where it can be found on the Einayim website. Tom and Moby discover something new every month that is related to the issue's theme.

== New Friends ==
This column first appeared in August 2006 in issue 72, whose theme was chocolate. Children interested in corresponding with new friends are invited to write a letter to Einayim, which will be published in the magazine and on its website.

== With Closed Eyes ==
This column was first published in June 2010 in issue 118, whose theme was round. This column presents 10 questions to be answered, just like “I Have a Riddle.” Unlike that column, however, the answers to the questions are hidden in different articles in the issue, and there is a stripe above each question that hints at the article in which the answer can be found.

== Pand ==
The comic strip about Pand the Red has appeared in the magazine since the very first issue. Pand was created by a boy named Yoav Yarden in November 1994 on a paper napkin. In each issue, Pand learns something new with the help of the Yarden family: Yoav (the son), Noga (the mother), and David (the father). He also learns from his sister Chalila (who first appeared in the issue on yellow and she got a friendship with Oded) and with the help of his friends Ruti (which is a feminist), Oded (which is the "nerd" character, he's also vegan and colorblind), and Tamar. The comics are created by Tamir Rauner and Noam Nadav.
