= Michael Bruno (economist) =

Israeli economist

- מיכאל ברונו
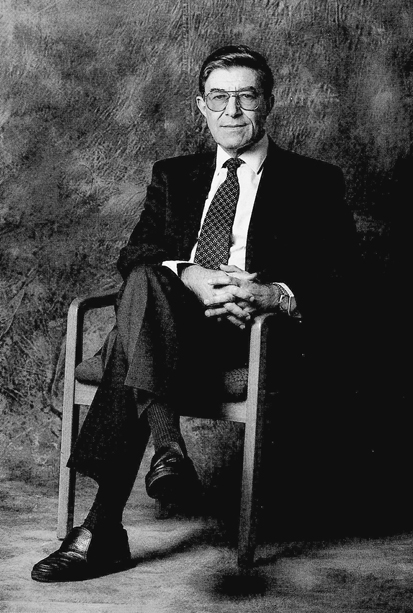

Chief Economist of the World Bank
- In office 1993–1996
- President: Lewis Preston
- Preceded by: Lawrence Summers
- Succeeded by: Joseph Stiglitz

Personal details
- Born: Michael Peter Bruno; 30 July 1932 Hamburg, Germany
- Died: 26 December 1996 (aged 64) Jerusalem, Israel
- Education: Hebrew University (BA); King's College, Cambridge (MA); Stanford University (PhD)

Academic background
- Doctoral advisor: Kenneth J. Arrow
- Influences: Don Patinkin

Academic work
- Discipline: Macroeconomics

Michael Peter Bruno (Hebrew: מיכאל ברונו; 30 July 1932 – 26 December 1996) was an Israeli economist. He was governor of the Bank of Israel and a former World Bank Chief Economist.

== Biography ==
Michael Peter Bruno was married to Ofra Hanoch (née Hirshenberg), with whom he had three children, daughter Yael and sons Ido and Asa. He died of cancer at home in Jerusalem. He is survived by his second wife Netta (née Ben-Porath).

== Awards and recognition ==
- In 1970, Bruno was appointed the Carl Melchior chair of international economics.
- In 1974, he was awarded the Rothschild Prize for Social Science.
- In 1994, he was awarded the Israel Prize, for economics.

== Published works ==
- Bruno, Michael; Di Tella, Guido; Dornbusch, Rudiger; Fischer, Stanley, eds. (1988). Inflation Stabilization: The Experience of Israel, Argentina, Brazil, Bolivia, and Mexico. Cambridge: MIT Press. ISBN 0-262-02279-6.
- Crisis, Stabilization, and Economic Reform: Therapy by Consensus, New York: Oxford University Press, 1999, ISBN 0-19-828663-5
- Bruno, Michael; Sachs, Jeffrey (1985). Economics of Worldwide Stagflation. Cambridge: Harvard University Press. ISBN 0-674-23475-8.

== See also ==
- List of Israel Prize recipients

Diplomatic posts
| Preceded by Lawrence Summers | Chief Economist of the World Bank; 1993–1996 | Succeeded by Joseph Stiglitz |
