= James S. Snyder =

American art historian

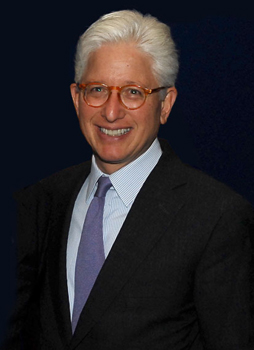
- Born: 1952 (age 73–74); Pittsburgh, Pennsylvania, U.S.
- Education: Harvard University
- Occupation: Director of The Jewish Museum

James Stewart Snyder is an American art historian and museum director. He is director emeritus of the Israel Museum in Jerusalem and a senior fellow at the Middle East Initiative at the Harvard Kennedy School. He was executive chairman of the Jerusalem Foundation. In 2023, Snyder was named director of the Jewish Museum in New York.

== Biography ==
James Snyder was born in a small town south of Pittsburgh, Pennsylvania. He is a graduate of Harvard University, where he studied literature and art history, and a Loeb Fellow of Harvard's Graduate School of Design. He holds an honorary doctorate of humane letters from Hebrew Union College. He is married to Tina Davis, a graphic artist and designer, and they have two children, Lily, a director at Alexander Gray Associates, and Daniel, a horticulturist in New York City.

== Art career ==
Snyder held a number of positions at The Museum of Modern Art, New York, culminating as Deputy Director from 1986 to 1996. At MoMA, Snyder oversaw the $60-million, 350,000-square-foot expansion of the Museum in 1984 and had significant organizational responsibility in such international loan exhibitions as Pablo Picasso: A Retrospective (1980) and Henri Matisse: A Retrospective (1992).

Snyder served as the Anne and Jerome Fisher Director of the Israel Museum from 1997 through 2016 and then as International President for an additional two-year term through 2018. As director, Snyder led the Museum through a dramatic period of growth, doubling its annual attendance to nearly one million visitors and increased its endowment to $200 million. Snyder also conceived and realized a series of initiatives to upgrade and enhance the experience of art and architecture across the Museum's 20-acre campus, culminating in a comprehensive $100-million, 300,000-square-foot expansion by James Carpenter Design Associates and Efrat-Kowalsky Architects.

Under Snyder's leadership, the Museum expanded its encyclopedic holdings with the addition of more than 55,000 individual objects and works of art, including a collection-building campaign during the Museum's 50th Anniversary in 2015. Among the notable works acquired during Snyder's tenure include: in Archaeology, the Renée and Robert Belfer Collection of Ancient Glass and Greek and Roman Antiquity and the Demirjian Family European Bronze Age Collection; in Jewish Art and Life, an illuminated Mishneh Torah of Maimonides, acquired jointly with the Metropolitan Museum of Art (ca. 1457); and the restored 18th-century Tzedek ve-Shalom Synagogue from Paramaribo, Suriname; and, in the Fine Arts, Nicolas Poussin’s "Destruction and Sack of the Temple of Jerusalem" (1625), Rembrandt van Rijn’s "St. Peter in Prison" (1631), Gustav Klimt’s "Die Medizin (Kompositionsentwurf)" (1897-1898); the Arturo Schwarz Collection of Dada and Surrealist Art, Jackson Pollock’s "Horizontal Composition" (1949), the Noel and Harriette Levine Collection of Photography, Yayoi Kusama’s "Ironing Board" (1963), Alina Szapocznikow’s "Cleaning Woman" (1965), and Gerhard Richter’s "Abstraktes Bild" (1997); together with acquisitions of emerging contemporary art and site-specific commissions by such artists as Ai Weiwei, Olafur Eliasson, Anish Kapoor, and Doug and Mike Starn.

Snyder strengthened the Museum's regional and international presence with collection and loan exhibitions in Jerusalem and traveling exhibitions worldwide, extending to North and South America, Europe, and Asia. These included: Ai Weiwei: Maybe, Maybe Not (2017); the Museum's 50th Anniversary exhibitions, among them A Brief History of Humankind (2015), featuring 14 pivotal objects from across the Museum's collections from prehistoric times through the present day, complemented by signature works from the Museum's contemporary holdings; James Turrell: Light Spaces (2014); Dress Codes: Revealing the Jewish Wardrobe (2014); Herod the Great: The King’s Final Journey (2013); A World Apart: Glimpses into the Lives of Hasidic Jews (2012); William Kentridge: Five Themes (2011); Looking for Owners and Orphaned Art (2008), two ground-breaking exhibitions on art looted during World War II; and Surrealism and Beyond (2007), which completed major international tours in 2009 and then again in 2014–15.

In 2017, he became director emeritus and international president for the Museum's worldwide activities. In that newly created role, Snyder spearheaded the ongoing development of the Museum's extensive international network of Friends organizations, continuing to build the Museum's relationships with sister institutions and collectors worldwide, and supporting the Museum's leadership in strategic planning, professional staff development, and program planning.

== Public service career ==
Snyder was appointed executive chairman of The Jerusalem Foundation in 2019. In this position, Snyder worked closely with the Foundation's international leadership to champion the vision of founder Teddy Kollek, Jerusalem's mayor from 1965 to 1993, to promote the city as an urban model for cross-communal coexistence.

== Awards and recognition ==
Snyder has been awarded the Commendatore dell’Ordine della Stella della Solidarietà Italiana (Commander of the Order of the Star of Italian Solidarity) by the Republic of Italy and the Chevalier de l’Ordre des Arts et des Lettres (Knight of the Order of Arts and Letters) of the French Republic. In 2011, he was awarded the Jerusalem Foundation's Teddy Kollek Award and, in 2012, Jerusalem Mayor Nir Barkat conferred on him the title of Honorary Citizen of Jerusalem, an honor first awarded to Israel's first President Chaim Weizmann.

== Published works ==
Snyder's publications include Museum Design: Planning and Building for Art (Oxford University Press) in 1993 and RENEWED: The Israel Museum Campus Renewal Project (Israel Museum) in 2011 and 2015 (revised).
