= Ido Bruno =

Israeli museum director

Ido Bruno (Hebrew: עידו ברונו; born 1963) is an Israeli designer, professor of design at the Bezalel Academy of Art and Design and former Director of the Israel Museum.

== Life ==
Bruno was born in Jerusalem in 1963 to Ofra and Michael Bruno. Bruno studied industrial design at the Bezalel Academy of Art and Design, Jerusalem. He joined the teaching staff at Bezalel in 1993, and received a full professorship in 2014.

He is one of Israel's most prominent designers and has overseen a larger number of important museum exhibitions, including Herod the Great: The King’s Final Journey at the Israel Museum in 2013. His works and exhibitions have been displayed in Israel and around the world, including MoMA, New York; the Museum of Contemporary Design and Applied Arts, Lausanne; the Design Museum in London; the Tel Aviv Museum of Art; the Israel Academy of Science and Humanities, Jerusalem, and many more.

Bruno was appointed Director of the Israel Museum in November 2017. It was announced that he would be stepping down in 2021.

=== Awards ===
- Medical Design Excellence Award (2007)
- The Israel Museum’s Sandberg Prize (2008)
- The Minister of Culture’s Prize for Design (2012)
