= Encyclopedic museum =

Type of museum showcasing diverse cultures

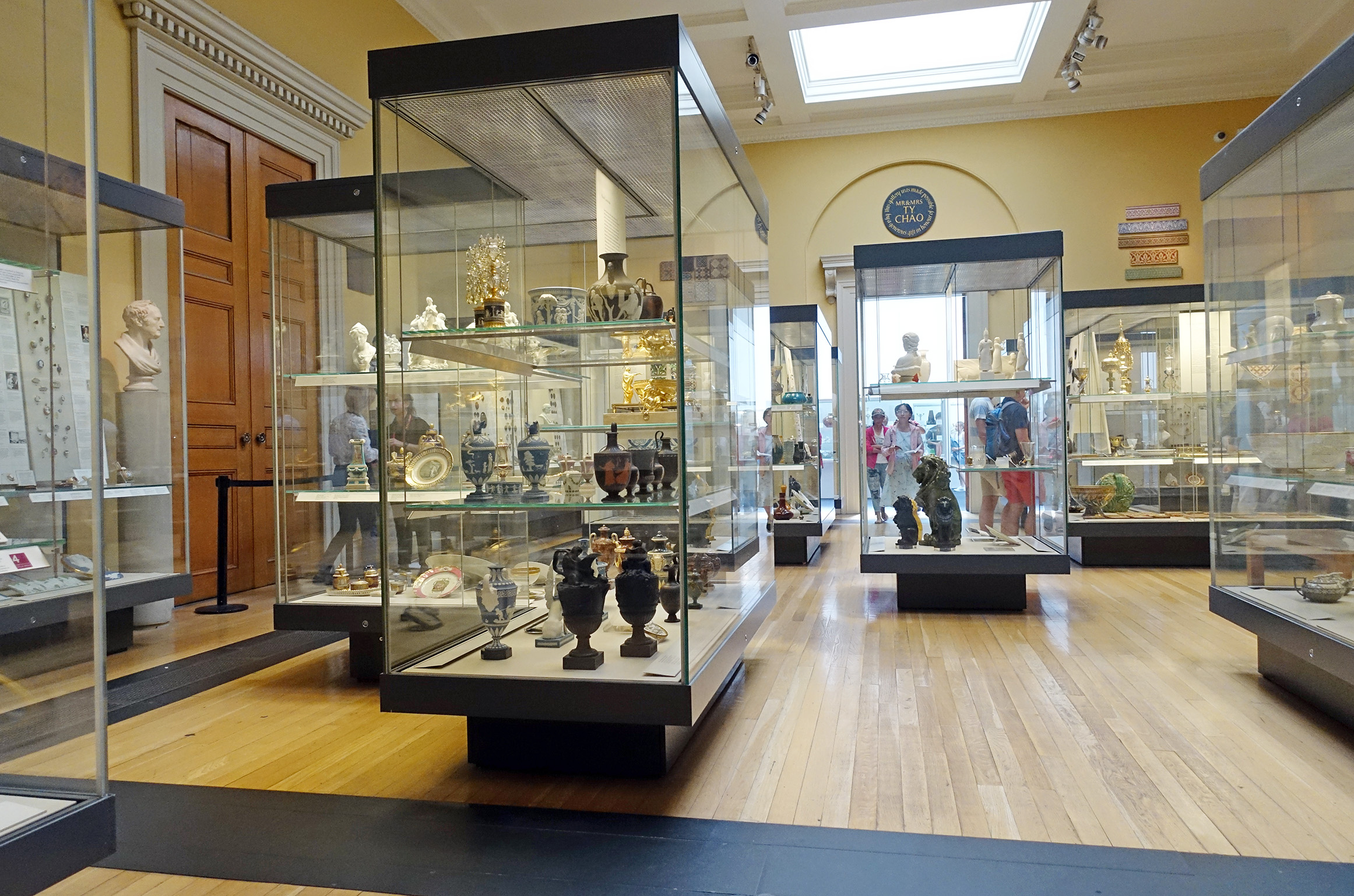
Collections at the British Museum.

Encyclopedic museums are large, mostly national, institutions where objects from all over the world, representing different cultures are kept in one building or a complex of buildings. They offer visitors an abundance of information on a variety of subjects that tell both local and global stories. The aim of encyclopedic museums is to provide examples of each classification available for a field of knowledge. Some scholars note the importance of encyclopedic museums in building civil society, especially given the significant number of people living outside their country of birth. They argue that these institutions benefit society by exposing visitors to a wide variety of cultures, fostering a sense of shared human history. However, other scholars and archaeologists critique encyclopedic museums, contending that they remove cultural objects from their original settings, thus losing their context.

== Historical origins ==
Encyclopedic museums originated during the Enlightenment period but gained prominence in the 18th and 19th centuries. The British Museum, established in London, 1759, pioneered the concept of the "encyclopedic museum," aiming to tell humanity's story through artifacts from around the world. This model inspired other major institutions including the Metropolitan Museum of Art in New York City (opened in 1870). These museums were shaped by imperial nations like Britain, France, and Germany, which amassed collections through colonization, exploration, and donations from collectors. In the United States, encyclopedic museums were built later, relying on private donations rather than royal collections.

== Universal museum ==
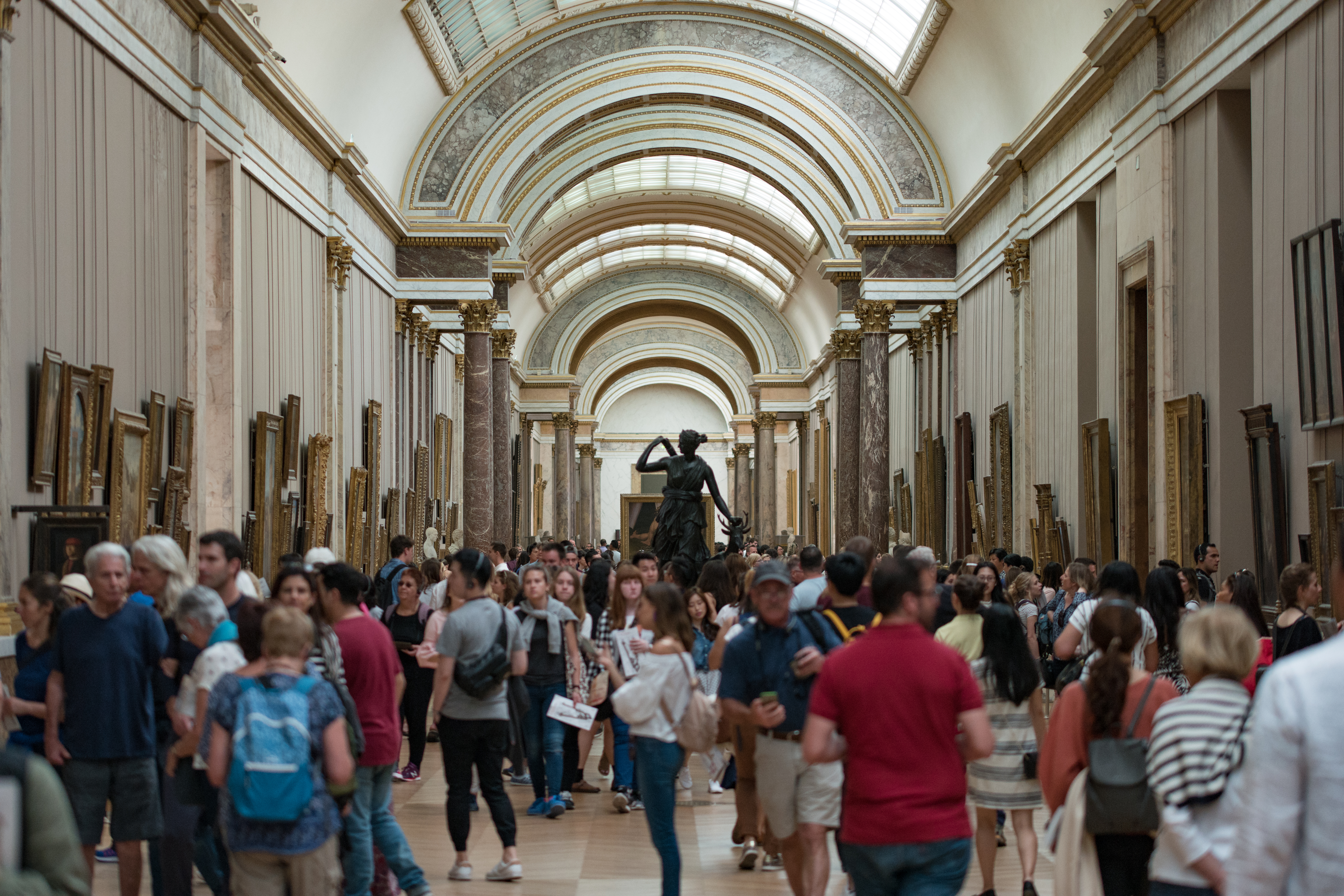
Visitors in the Grande Galerie of the Louvre.

The term "musée universel" emerged during the early 19th century in France. The Louvre, originally called "Muséum Central des Arts," exemplifies this model. Universal museums were rooted in the French tradition of presenting art as part of a unified human story. The universal museum concept focuses on the idea of the unity of mankind and its creations. It seeks to present a cohesive narrative that ties together human history and creativity across cultures. The term "universal" suggests a global ambition to represent humanity as a whole, rather than emphasizing individual cultural distinctions.

The terms encyclopedic museum and universal museum are often used interchangeably to describe institutions that collect and display artifacts from diverse cultures worldwide. However, they differ in their underlying philosophies, historical origins, and approaches to presenting cultural narratives. Encyclopedic museums focuses on diversity and connections between cultures. Universal museums Emphasizes unity and shared human history.

Both museum types face criticism for their historical ties to imperialism and the acquisition of artifacts under questionable circumstances. Debates over restitution—returning looted cultural objects—have intensified since the early 2000s. Reports have called for ethical reforms, urging museums to return stolen artifacts to their countries of origin.

== Challenges ==
In recent years, debates about returning stolen or looted artifacts have put pressure on encyclopedic museums. Critics also question whether encyclopedic museums can truly represent all cultures equally or if they reflect the power of empires that built them. While these museums aim to tell a global story, some argue that they still focus too much on Western perspectives. Encyclopedic museums are evolving to address these challenges. They are rethinking how they present their collections and trying to create more inclusive narratives that involve dialogue between different cultures. For instance, modern encyclopedic museums aim not just to display objects but also to connect them with stories about humanity's shared history.

Experts suggest that humanity could benefit from new global museums built on consent, where nations voluntarily lend artifacts to represent interconnected cultures. Such institutions would avoid past mistakes by respecting cultural traditions and embracing diverse approaches to heritage. These museums could be spread across continents, making them accessible to more people worldwide.
