= Israel Painters and Sculptors Association =

Organisation in Israel

Israel Painters and Sculptors Association איגוד הציירים והפסלים בישראל
- Born: 1934 (age 91–92); Israel
- Known for: Painting and sculpting
- Movement: Israeli art

The Israel Painters and Sculptors Association (Hebrew: איגוד הציירים והפסלים בישראל) was established in 1934 and has been associated with many painters and sculptors who worked in Israel. With the establishment of the State of Israel, the name of the association was changed to the "Association of Painters and Sculptors in Israel". In 2002, the name was changed again to "Painters and Sculptors Association (Tel Aviv)" and three independent associations of painters and sculptors were established in Jerusalem, Haifa and Be'er Sheva.

== Hebrew Artists Association ==
The association was founded in October 1920 by the Association of Hebrew Artists, in its committee were the following artists: Meir Gur-Arie, S. Ben-David, Abel Pann, Avraham Melnikov and Shmuel Opel. The aim of the association was to "develop and disseminate among the people the arts, the art work and taste and beauty in the Hebrew spirit." In April 1921 the members of the association presented an exhibition at the Tower of David.

Since 1923, the association has exhibited 19 different group exhibitions. These were eclectic exhibitions with many works of art on various artistic levels. Alongside these exhibitions, occasional group exhibitions were held on a commercial or artistic basis.

In addition, the Society created the Painting and Sculpture Section of the journal "Theater and Art" which was published in 1927.

== Association of Painters and Sculptors ==
On August 4, 1934, the first convention of the Association of Painters and Sculptors was held in Tel Aviv. There was talk about building a pavilion for exhibitions and a permanent exhibition, establishing a cooperative of painters, a club, mutual help and housing for the members of the association. A committee was chosen, composed of Chaim Gliksberg, Nahum Gutman, Newman, Avni, Yishai Kolbiansky, Leoben and Eliahu Sigard. Gliksberg was the association secretary. On August 14, a parallel assembly was held in Jerusalem, in which a committee was appointed that included Zeev Ben Zvi, Meir Gur-Arie and Jacob Steinhardt.

One of the association's exhibitions, "The Eighth Exhibition," took place in December 1942 at Habima Theatre, where the works of Arie Aroch, Aharon Giladi, Zvi Meirovitch, Avraham Natan (Nathanson), Avigdor Stematsky and Yehezkel Streichman were exhibited. Another sculptor, Dov Feigin appeared in the catalog but did not participate in the exhibition at last. Another exhibition – "The Shiva Exhibition" – took place in 1947 at the Tel Aviv Museum, with the participation of Aroch, Giladi, Meirovitch, Natan, Streichman, Jacob Wexler and Yosef Zaritsky. In these exhibitions, the artists aspired to the creation of modern art under European influence and to create "an original style, rooted in our reality." In these exhibitions, although they did not establish a clear artistic platform, there was a tendency to emphasize the painterly means. In addition, these exhibitions symbolized a certain separation and a "positive appearance" of the artists against the background of the "generalism" regime ... which helps blur the boundaries and dimensions, in order to impose mediocrity "

In 1948,Yosef Zaritsky served as chairman of the association, and when an invitation came to present an exhibition of Israeli artists in the Italian pavilion at the Venice Biennale, he chose not to share the list of participating artists because of his concern about the selection of medium-sized artists. In the wake of the accusations, several artists, including Moshe Castel, Streichman and Yohanan Simon, announced their immediate retirement from the association, and they established with Zaritsky the "Ofakim Hadashim".

From 1964 to 1967, Ruth Horam served as the chairperson of the Association

From 1969 to 1981, Alexander Bogen served as chairman of the Association.

In the years 1989–2005, Rachel Shavit-Bentwich served as chairperson of the Association and as Chairperson of the Honorary Council.

== Members (partial list) ==
- Alima
- Orna Lutski, since 1996
- Zvi Yehuda Aldouby
- Ora Lahav Chaaltiel
- Abraham Hasak, since 1959
- Moshe Kassirer, since 2008
- Fain Maureen, since 1990
- Gad Ullman (see Hebrew Gad Ullman)
- Arie Wachenhauser, since 1962
- Igor Zeiger

== See also ==
Visual arts in Israel
