= Lea Nikel =

Israeli artist

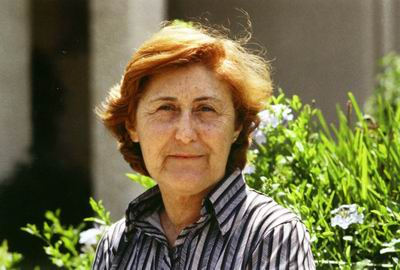
- Photograph of Lea Nikel, 1979; Photographer: Stanley I. Batkin
- Born: December 6, 1918; Zhitomir, Ukraine
- Died: 10 September 2005 (aged 86)
- Known for: Painting
- Movement: Israeli art

Lea Nikel (Hebrew: לאה ניקל; born 1918, died 2005) was an Israeli abstract artist.

== Biography ==
Lea Nikel (Lea Nikelsberg) was born in Zhitomir, Ukraine, on December 6, 1918. Her family immigrated to Mandatory Palestine in 1920. She had one sister, Sara (Bock), who was born in 1926. She began studying with painter Chaim Gliksberg in Tel Aviv in 1935, later studying with Yechezkel Streichman and Avigdor Stematsky. From 1961 to 1977, Nikel lived in Greenwich Village (one year), Rome (three years) and New York (four years), before returning to Israel in 1977. She was married to Sam Leiman and had one daughter, Ziva Hanan. She lived in Moshav Kidron.

== Artistic career ==
Nikel held her first solo exhibition in 1954 at the Chemerinsky Art Gallery in Tel Aviv and her first solo show in Paris at Galerie Colette Allendy in 1957. She took part in numerous international group exhibitions, including the Venice Biennale in 1964. The Tel Aviv Museum of Art organized a retrospective exhibition of her paintings in 1995. Nikel continued to paint until just a few days before her death on September 10, 2005.

In 2023 her work was included in the exhibition Action, Gesture, Paint: Women Artists and Global Abstraction 1940-1970 at the Whitechapel Gallery in London.

== Artistic style ==
Nikel's style was a form of expressionistic abstraction sometimes called lyrical abstraction. She painted with a brusque, generous touch and favored high-keyed colors. She was known for buoyant compositions consisting of rough-edged blocks of color and scribbly, calligraphic lines that together conveyed a sense of imaginative excitement and urgent sensuousness.

== Awards ==
- In 1972, she was awarded the Sandberg Prize for Israeli Art from the Israel Museum.
- In 1982, Nikel was awarded the Dizengoff Prize for Painting.
- In 1985, she was awarded a medal from the UNESCO workshop on experimental activities in Nice, France.
- In 1987, she won the Gamzo Award.
- In 1995, she was awarded the Israel Prize, for painting.
- In 1997, she was made a Chevalier of Arts and Letters by the French Minister of Culture.

== See also ==
- List of Israel Prize recipients
