= David Hendler =

Israeli painter (1904–1984)

David Hendler דוד הנדלר
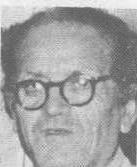
- Born: 1904; Kyiv, Russian Empire
- Died: 2 May 1984 (aged 79–80)
- Resting place: Kiryat Shaul Cemetery
- Education: Prague Art Academy, Isaac Frenkel's Studio in Tel Aviv
- Spouse: Aviva
- Children: 2
- Awards: Dizengoff Prize 1938,1940,1945-46

David Hendler (Hebrew: דוד הנדלר; 1904 – May 2, 1984) was an Israeli painter. Known as "the painter of Tel Aviv", he was the winner of the Dizengoff Prize for painting.

== Early life and career ==
David Handler was born in the city of Kiev in the Russian Empire (later Ukraine) in 1904. In 1924 he immigrated to the Mandatory Palestine in his own right. Handler privately studied drawing with Professor Pichel from the Academy of Art in Prague, in Tel Aviv he continued his studies with the painter Yitzhak Frenkel, from whom he drew the influence of modern French art.

Hendler is best known for his drawings; He had a fine sense of color, and his pencil drawn sketches varied with little spots of water color, were common in many homes in Tel Aviv and other cities of the country. Hendler was in his essence as sketchiest; This is evident by the lightness of his touch on the paper and the delicacy of drawn line. In his nude paintings, the influence of Henri Matisse, the teacher of his own teacher, Isaac Frenkel, was evident.

However, he also painted in oil colors on canvas and industrial wood (Masonite), but these works are relatively rare compared to his paintings on paper. During his lifetime, Handler painted many works of art in order to survive. It is said that he would finish a painting in a few minutes. At times due to the severity of his economic situation, he would go through Tel Aviv homes with his pictures, knocking on doors and trying to sell his pictures for a few pennies.

Starting in 1981, Handler was confined to his bed due to muscular dystrophy. Aviva Uri dined him at their home and later when he was hospitalized at Levinstein Hospital.

David Handler died on the first of Ayar 5744 (1984), and was buried in the Kiryat Shaul cemetery. He was survived by his wife, Aviva.

Later, a memorial plaque was placed on the home of Hedler and Uri on Jericho Street in Tel Aviv.

== Influence and achievements ==
Hendler's influence on drawing in Israel was great, and it is evident in the works of Arieh Navon, Avigdor Stimatsky (also students of Yitzhak Frenkel) and others. The main motifs in his paintings are laborers, horses and other work animals, the old houses of Tel Aviv, the Tel Aviv promenade. During his lifetime.

Handler won the Dizengoff Prize three times (1938, 1940, 1945–46). He presented a solo exhibition at the Bezalel Home for the Disabled in 1961 and at the Tel Aviv Museum of Art in 1981 (in an exhibition named: "The Hendlers of Hendler").
