= David Rakia =

Israeli painter (1928–2012)

David Rakia (Hebrew: דוד רקיה; 1928-December, 2012) was an Israeli painter known for his dream-like depictions of Jerusalem and use of Hebrew letters in his compositions.

== Biography ==
David Rakia was born in Vienna, Austria into a religious Jewish family. His grandfather was a sofer, a traditional religious scribe, and though his father was a tailor, he also was trained in the same tradition. In 1938 Rakia's family emigrated to Mandatory Palestine following the Anschluss. He fought in the 1948 Arab–Israeli War, during which he was wounded and his brother killed. It was while recovering in a sanatorium that Rakia received his first art lessons from Mordecai Ardon. After his discharge, Rakia enrolled at Bezalel Academy of Arts and Design in 1953, and there he studied under Isidor Ascheim and Yaacov Eisenscher among others. In 1955 Rakia completed the program there and left for the Beaux-Arts de Paris where he worked under Jean Souverbie.

In Paris, Rakia befriended numerous artists including Ossip Zadkine, Max Ernst, Emmanuel Mane-Katz, and Marc Chagall. It was under the suggestion of Samuel Bak that he change his name from Sternfeld (Star-field) to Rakia (Hebrew, for heavens). In 1960 Rakia returned to Israel.

== Influences and Styles ==
The Israeli critic Gideon Ofrat sees Rakia as practically the only true Surrealist in Jewish art. Contemporaries and others who speak of Rakia will mention Expressionism at least as frequently. In his later works many invoke Abstract expressionism or even action art. Many make note of his Kabbalistic symbols, while others discuss his abstract geometric pieces. More cautious observers will simply write of "abstraction." All this speaks to a striking range and versatility of an entire gamut of modern styles. Nearly all mention his treatment of Jerusalem as a subject, and speak of his portrayal of the heavenly and terrestrial Jerusalem. Nearly all also note his incorporation of Hebrew letters in his works, to varying degrees.

Ofrat says that Rakia was an adherent of Rudolf Steiner's Anthroposophy, but that after his return to Israel, Rakia became more interested in Jewish themes and subjects. That eventually precipitated a break with the movement. Rakia himself said that the Six-Day War was what caused him to address Jerusalem as a recurring motif. On the one hand Rakia seems unusually free to absorb all modern styles and shift between them. On the other, there seems an arc of stylistic development that constitutes an artistic journey, largely ending in increasingly abstract painting.

Rakia speaks of the influence of his grandfather and his fascination with Hebrew letters. At the same time, the clearest artistic influence on his use of letters and Kabbalistic symbols is Mordecai Ardon. Ruth Dorot reads a language of color in Rakia's work, with the artist himself feeling profound affinity to Wassily Kandinsky, constantly revisiting his Concerning the Spiritual in Art. To her, Rakia uses a specific language of color that can be read just as much as his letters. This influence of Kandisnky might also indicate the geometric shapes and lyrical curves in some of Rakia's painting, and more prominently featured in his drawing.

Towards the end of his life, Rakia suffered from a chronic illness that made it difficult to even hold his brush. He shifted in style again to color studies made entirely of Hebrew letters, and more abstract expressionist pieces.

== David Rakia Plaza ==
In October 2020 Mayor Moshe Leon of Jerusalem dedicated David Rakia Plaza, not far from the Old City and the David Rakia Gallery.
