= Pinchas Cohen Gan =

Israeli painter and mixed-media artist

Pinhas Cohen Gan פנחס כהן גן
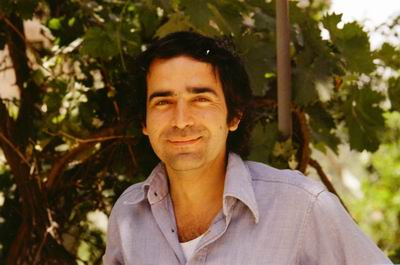
- Pinchas Cohen Gan (1978)
- Born: 1942 (age 83–84); Meknes, Morocco
- Known for: Painter and mixed-media artist
- Movement: Israeli art

Pinchas Cohen Gan (Hebrew: פנחס כהן גן; born November 3, 1942) is a Moroccan-Israeli painter and mixed-media artist. He was awarded the Sandberg Prize (1979), the Culture and Sport Ministry's prize for his life's work (2005), and the Israel Prize in Art (2008).

== Biography ==
Pinchas Cohen Gan was born in 1942 in Meknes, Morocco, to an observant Jewish upper-middle-class family. His father, Moshe HaCohen, was a painter who left his art to support his family as a merchant; and his mother, Rivka Gan, worked as a French teacher. He studied in a Talmud Torah where they also taught mathematics. In 1949 he made Aliyah to Israel with his parents and four brothers on the ship “Kedma,” and he grew up in Kiryat Bialik, in a neighborhood of German immigrants. In his youth, Cohen Gan also worked in construction in order to help support his family. He later described his feelings of loneliness as an Eastern Jew growing up in Israeli society in the early days of the State. As a young boy he was already interested in art and studied sculpture with Aharon Ashkenazi.

In 1954 he joined the youth movement “Hashomer Hatzair” [The Youth Guard] and continued as a counselor in the movement until he went into the army. He did his military service in a unit of Nahal [unit combining military service with work on an agricultural settlement]. In 1962 he left Kibbutz Lehavot HaBashan and moved to Jerusalem, where he began studies at the Bezalel Academy of Arts and Design, but he had to leave his studies after about a week because of lack of funding. He returned to Haifa, where he studied drawing with Marcel Janco and sculpture with Michael Gross at Oranim Academic College. In 1967 he began studying for a second time at Bezalel. In 1968, during his studies there, he was wounded in a terrorist attack in the Mahane Yehuda Market.

=== Activity, 1972-1975 ===
During the 1970s Cohen Gan created a variety of activities, some of them performance art. On February 22, 1972, an exhibition of 20 of his engravings opened, including those created while he worked in the stable of Kibbutz Nirim. The works, which were hung above the cows’ water troughs, made use of the techniques of photographic etching combined with aquatint. The subjects included images of buildings or human beings, to some of whom Cohen Gan added colored strings that he glued to the paper. Publicity for the exhibition, as an experiment in breaking established habits of looking at art, in addition to the anecdotal nature of the event, led to Cohen Gan's becoming famous and to his works being exhibited in the Dugit Gallery in Tel Aviv.

Other projects took on a more avant garde character, in that he did not put a conservative art object at their center. As part of “The Dead Sea Project,” which was created between 1972 and 1973, Cohen Gan created plastic sleeves that stretched from a spring in Ein Feshkha, south of Einot Tzukim (“Cliff Springs”), to the Dead Sea and floated on top of it. Within the plastic sleeves Cohen Gan raised fish, as a symbol of cultural isolation and in an attempt to integrate essential principles into the landscape. Other projects were of a more sharply political nature. In “Activities in Refugee Camps in Jericho” (February 10, 1974), for example, Cohen Gan erected a tent in a refugee camp near Jericho. In “Touching the Border” (January 7, 1974) Cohen Gan placed demographic information about Israel on steel bars that he placed on four of the country's borders, in places where security forces stopped him. These activities and others were displayed at an exhibition in the Israel Museum in 1974.

While the obvious content of these works hints at political issues, questions such as alienation, immigration, refugees, and mental states, expressed in the issue of the status of various ethnic groups in Israeli society, make up the hidden content. In 1974 he met his partner, the architect Aya Wald, at the opening of an exhibition of the works of Robert Rauschenberg at the Israel Museum. The two of them were together until 1980.

=== Figure, Form, Formula, 1972-1975 ===
During the second half of the 1970s Cohen Gan lived in New York City and studied at Columbia University. Among other things, he studied with the art historian Meyer Schapiro. During this period he mounted several exhibits at the gallery of Bertha Urdang and at the galleries of Max Protech in New York and Washington, D.C. Some of the works were painted on tablecloths acquired from a hotel that had gone into bankruptcy.

The art which Cohen Gan began to produce from this period abandoned conceptual “activity” for more traditional art objects. In 1978 he mounted a solo exhibition of new works in the Tel Aviv Museum of Art under the Name “Works After the Concept.” Sarah Breitberg Semel, curator of the exhibition, presented Cohen Gan's new works as expressing his disappointment with the combining of science and art, a combination that characterized the early conceptual works of Cohen Gan. At the same time Cohen Gan declared that he was not interested in concentrating on the graphic quality of works of art, but rather on an attempt to decrease the distance between the idea and its visual expression. In the eyes of the art critics, the works were perceived as “conceptual painting,” and as a retreat from the severe conceptualism of Cohen Gan's early works. Adam Baruch remarked about the exhibition that Cohen Gan was trying to create a human “idea picture.”

A common motif in these works is the conflict between “art” and “science.” This conflict signified what Cohen Gan called “the theory of relative art” – an epistemology within the framework of the laws of artistic creativity perceived as a system of dynamic attributions of culture and the varying laws of nature.

In the series of works entitled “Conflicts in formula and painting” (1982), for example, Cohen Gan divided the canvas into two parts. On the upper part of the canvas Cohen Gan painted a richly colored expressive work with anatomical human figures adorning it, comprising an innovation in painting when viewed against the background of conceptual art in Israel and the United States. On the lower part of the painting were three-dimensional body parts and formulas on a white background. The formulas were an expression of philosophical-esthetic texts, in which Cohen Gan divided artistic activity into units and the connections between them, and presented them as a linguistic-mathematical system.

In other works of this period, such as “The Other Science in Gray” (1982) or “Israeli Paradigm of the Prodigal Son No.1” (1982), a large number of images appear. Mordechai Omer pointed out with regard to the relationship between the images and the background in these works that they create a sealed space, that in spite of its tangibility, we were “unable to sense.”

Another expression of his preoccupation with the concept of space appears in works such as those exhibited in the series of works entitled “Area Drawings, Space Drawings, Abyss Drawings” (1981) in the Gimel Gallery, Jerusalem, and in the installation “Programmed Figure in Curved Space, or Painted Solution to Advance Problem no. 457617” (1981) in the Noemi Givon Gallery, Tel Aviv. In this installation Cohen Gan built sophisticated geometric bodies in wooden frames covered in painted canvas that comprised an attempt to examine the conventions of Euclidean geometry as an expression of his occupation with the epistemology of art.

=== Processing history ===
During the 1980s Cohen Gan converted the image of the anonymous figure into the image of the head without a body. The use of this floating image also made possible the change in the composition of Cohen Gan's works, which became more expressive. The unattached head, according to Mordechai Omer, symbolizes the lack of fusion between body and soul. In the places in which Cohen Gan continued to use an entire figure, he used line drawings, similar to stick figures.

In spite of the fact that even in his early works he relates to political and social issues, in the 1980s and 1990s he gives more attention to historical events. In a newspaper interview Cohen Gan contended that “all the philosophizing about the painful human problem has turned it into an esthetic problem.”

In addition to his treatment of the relation between East and West in culture, Cohen Gan devoted considerable space in his work to the Holocaust. In 1988, for example, he led a demonstration outside the Museum of Modern Art in New York City, which was exhibited at that time an exhibition of the work of the artist Anselm Kiefer. The carried a sign that read “Anselm Kiefer is the artist that Adolf Hitler wasn’t,” in protest against the process of legitimization that Germany was undergoing under the auspices of Kiefer's art. Within his treatment of this topic, the works that stand out most are those in the exhibition “And These Are the Names,” which was mounted as part of the Israeli exhibition at the Biennale in Istanbul, Turkey, in October 1992. In this exhibition Cohen displayed works dedicated to various Jewish communities from Europe and the Near East that perished in the Holocaust.

In 1991, in light of his contribution of 300 of his works to the Tel Aviv Museum of Art, a retrospective exhibition of his works on paper was mounted at the Helena Rubinstein Pavilion for Contemporary Art. At the time Cohen Gan was living in Paris, where he had been given a studio for half a year in “la Cite” artists’ quarter.

In addition to his work as an artist, during these years Cohen Gan continued to write articles on esthetics in which he also included various biographical treatments. The most important of these is “Dictionary of the Syntax of Painting and Sculpture,” which contained a fictitious dictionary of 200 entries translated into 6 languages. His book, "Art, Law, and the Social Order," documents his 1993 legal battle against the Bezalel Academy of Arts and Design in an attempt to receive the same conditions as a professor of Art that professors of science receive.

In 1995 he was awarded the Dizengoff Prize for his life's work, and in 2008 he won the Israel Prize in Painting.

== Gallery ==
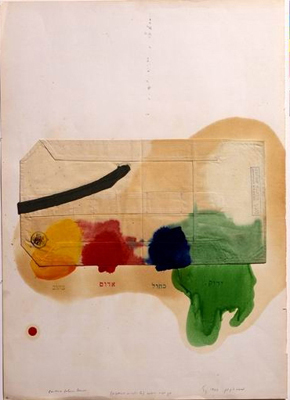
First Aid Kit (of the Primary Colours), 1974
Oil, collage, and stamps on paper
Israel Museum, Jerusalem

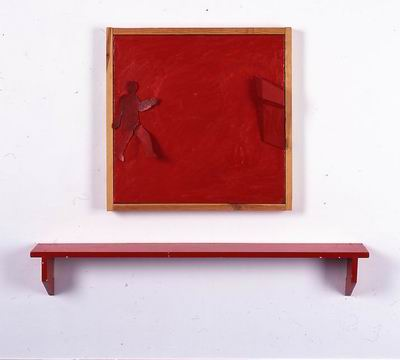
Figure and Correspondent Form with Red Shelf, 1978
Oil on canvas, cardboard and wood
Israel Museum, Jerusalem

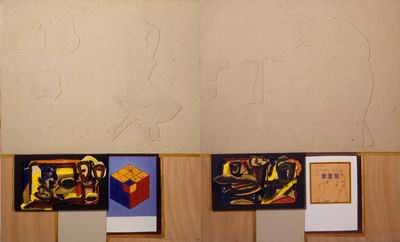
Memories A (with the Hungarian Dice), 1994
Mixed media
Israel Museum, Jerusalem

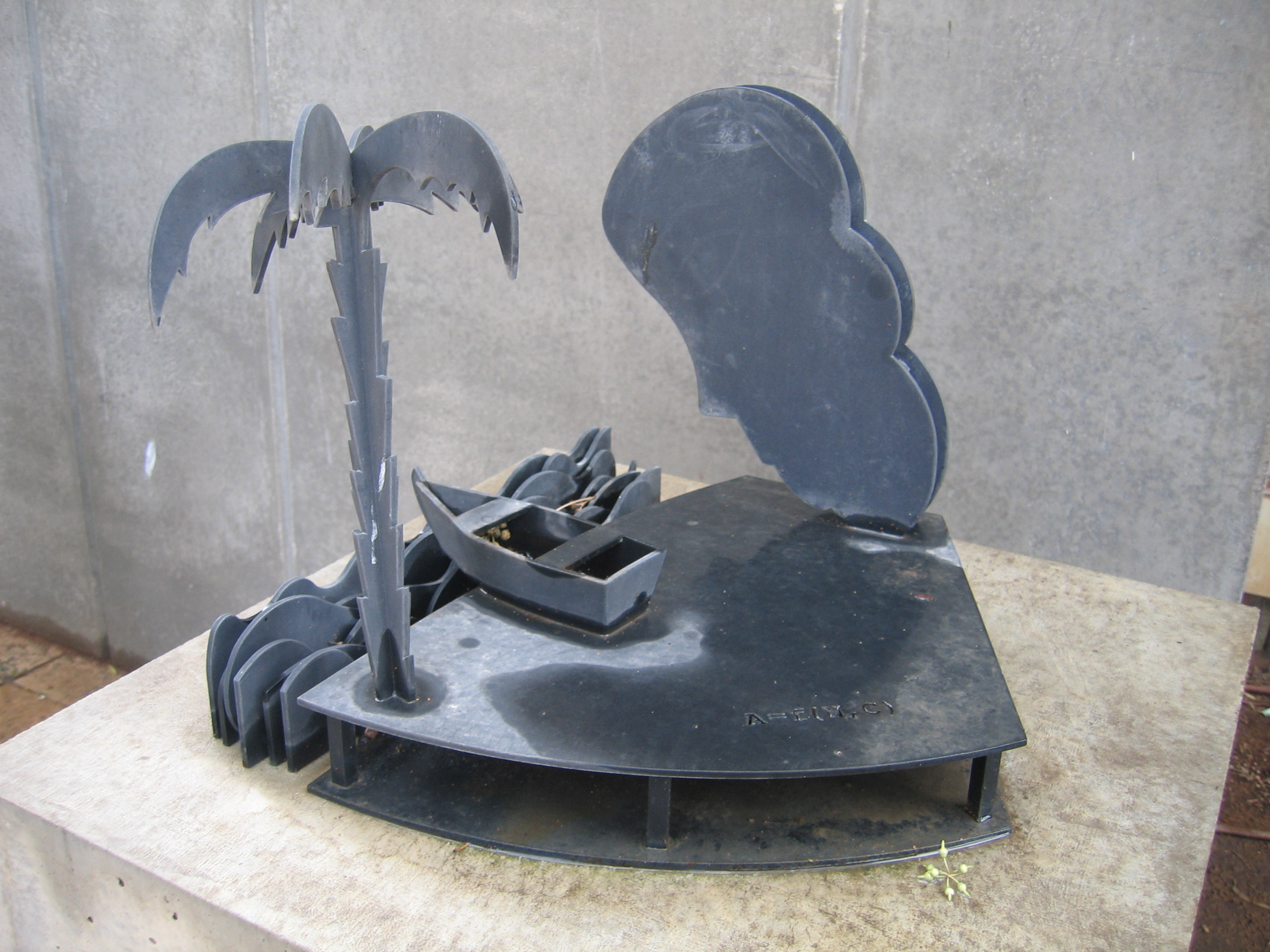
Utopian Architecture (detail), 2002
Iron
Tel Aviv Museum of Art, Tel Aviv

== Education ==
- 1967–70 Bezalel Academy of Arts and Design Academy of Art, Jerusalem, advanced studies
- 1971 Central School of Art, London
- 1971–73 B.A. social sciences and art, Hebrew University, Jerusalem
- 1975–77 M.F.A. in arts, Columbia University of Arts, New York

== Teaching ==
- 1971–75 Bezalel Academy of Arts and Design, Jerusalem

== Awards and prizes ==
- 1978 America-Israel Cultural Foundation
- 1978 Isaac Stern Creativity Prize
- 1979 Sandberg Prize, Israel Museum, Jerusalem
- 1991 Eugene Kolb Prize for Israeli Graphics
- 1991 Minister of Education Prize
- 1999 Acquisition Prize, Tel Aviv Museum
- 2005 Prize for Life's Work in Plastic Art, Ministry of Education
- 2005 Gan was awarded the Dizengoff Prize for Painting.
- 2008 The Israel Prize in painting.

== Solo exhibitions (selection) ==
- 1972 - “Total Art: From Landscape to Abstraction and from Nature to Art”, Dugit Gallery, Tel Aviv
- 1972 - “Exhibition of Etchings”, Cowshed of Kibbutz Nirim
- 1974 - “Activities”, Billy Rose Pavilion, The Israel Museum, Jerusalem; curator: Yona Fischer (catalogue)
- 1974 - “Newsprints and Drawings”, Rina Gallery, New York
- 1974 - “Plans”, Delson-Richter Gallery, Tel Aviv
- 1975 - “Alaska Project Drawings”, Sara Gilat Gallery, Jerusalem; Rina Gallery, New York
- 1975 - “Dislocation: Moving an Immigrant’s Physical Space Into a Gallery”, Delson-Richter Gallery, Jaffa
- 1976 - “Figurative and Electronic Circuits”, Max Protetch Gallery, New York (catalogue)
- 1976 - “New Works”, Rina Gallery, New York
- 1976 - “Figure, Form, Formula”, Max Protetch Gallery, Washington DC
- 1977 - “The Language of Art and the History of Art”, Max Protetch Gallery, New York
- 1978 - Tel Aviv Museum of Art, Tel Aviv; Curator: Sara Breitberg (catalogue)
- 1978 - “Deductive Figures in Painting”, Riebenfeld Gallery, Jaffa
- 1978 - “Deductive Premises in Space”, Gimel Gallery, Jerusalem
- 1979 - “Deductive Premises in Painting”, University of Rhode Island, Kingston (catalogue)
- 1979 - “Secret Exhibition”, Chelsea Hotel, New York
- 1980 - Max Protetch Gallery, New York
- 1980 - “Phrase, Utterance, Claim”, Mabat Gallery, Tel Aviv
- “Deductive Premises in Space: 1. Entropy (painting); 2. Imprisoned Geometry (etching)”, Gimel Gallery, Jerusalem
- 1981 - “Works on Paper”, Galleriet Gallery, Lund, Sweden
- 1981 - “Deductive Premises: The Curved Space (Non-Euclidean Geometry)”, Max Protetch Gallery, New York
- 1981 - “Image Drawings: The Curved Space (Non-Euclidean Geometry)”, Noemi Givon Gallery of Contemporary Art, Tel Aviv (catalogue)
- 1981 - “Area Drawings”, Gimel Gallery, Jerusalem
- 1981 - “Space Drawings”, Gimel Gallery, Jerusalem
- 1982 - San Francisco Art Institute; curator: Mark Rosenthal (catalogue)
- 1982 - “Black Sabbath”, Max Protetch Gallery, New York
- 1982 - “Abyss Painting”, Gimel Gallery, Jerusalem
- 1982 - “Sweet Poison: Light-Sensitive Drawings”, Gimel Gallery, Jerusalem
- 1982 - “Men at Work: Seven Large Paintings”, Givon Art Gallery, Tel Aviv
- 1983 - Museum of Art, Ein Harod, and Haifa Museum of Art; curators: Galia Bar Or, Mordechai Omer, Gavriel Tadmor (catalogue)
- 1984 - “Works”, Sara Gilat Gallery, Jerusalem
- 1984 - “Reinforced Photography”, Camera Obscura Gallery, Tel Aviv
- 1985 - “Metaformal Art”, Tat-Rama Gallery, Tel Aviv
- 1985 - “The 15th District”, Mabat Gallery, Tel Aviv
- 1985 - “Homeland B: A Painting Model”, Gimel Gallery, Jerusalem
- 1986 - “Paintings”, Maimad Gallery, Tel Aviv
- 1986 - “A Jewish Holocaust Touches Me”, Gimel Gallery, Jerusalem
- 1986 - “Painting and Antithesis”, Gimel Gallery, Jerusalem
- 1987 - Kibbutz Lohamei Hagetaot Gallery; Kibbutz Kabri Gallery
- 1987 - “Paintings”, Dvir Gallery, Tel Aviv
- 1987 - “Hovering Heads”, Maimad Katan Gallery, Tel Aviv
- 1987 - “Ten Commandments (Decalogue): Paintings”, Maimad Gallery, Tel Aviv
- 1987 - “Pictures Speak: Paintings from the Bank of Tears”,
- 1988 - “Prints 1968-1988”, Museum of Israeli Art, Ramat Gan; curator: Mordechai Omer (catalogue)
- 1988 - “Cosmos, Pathos, Chaos”, Dvir Gallery, Tel Aviv
- 1989 - “The Fourth World”, Gimel Gallery, Jerusalem
- 1989 - “Jew”, Maimad Gallery, Tel Aviv
- 1989 - A Thousand Years of Pain and Grace", Gimel Gallery, Jerusalem
- 1990 - “Paintings Remember”, Artists Studio, Tel Aviv
- 1990 - “New Works: Anafranil 25 mg”, Chelouche Gallery, Tel Aviv
- 1990 - “From the Private I to Inside Me”, Arad Museum
- 1992 - “And These Are the Names”, Istanbul International Art Biennial; curator: Galia Bar Or (catalogue)
- 1992 - “Works on Paper 1969-1992”, Helena Rubinstein Pavilion for Contemporary Art, Tel Aviv Museum of Art; curator: Talia Rapaport (catalogue)
- 1993 - “Religious Art:They and We”, Chelouche Gallery, Tel Aviv
- 1994 - “Remaking of History”, Museum of Art, Ein Harod; curator: Galia Bar Or (catalogue)
- 1996 - “Figure, Form, Formula”, Weatherspoon Art Museum, University of North Carolina; curators: Ruth Beesch, Kristine Stiles (catalogue)
- 1997 - Givon Art Gallery, Tel Aviv
- 1997 - “Where Are We Heading?: Blind Obedience to an Immoral Duty”, Minerva Gallery, Tel Aviv
- 2000 - The Architecture of Evil in the Third Reich: A Tri-Thematic Installation in Painting, Sculpture and Architecture", Givon Art Gallery, Tel Aviv (catalogue)
- 2001 - “A Response to the Aesthetics of Evil in the Third Reich from the Viewpoint of a Levantine Jew”, an installation in painting, sculpture and books, Kibbutz Nirim
- 2006 - “The Art of Excess”, Gallery of the Art Institute, Oranim College; curator: David Wakstein (catalogue)
- 2008 - “Large Format Works”, Givon Art Gallery, Tel Aviv
- 2012 - “When My Redemption Comes I Shall Treasure My Tears: Works 1970–2012”, Tel Aviv Museum of Art; curator: Galia Bar Or (catalogue)

== See also ==
- Visual arts in Israel
- List of Israel Prize recipients
