= Deganit Berest =

Israeli painter and photographer

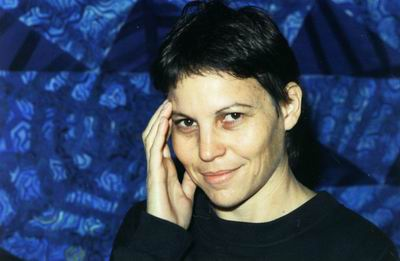
Deganit Berest

Deganit Berest (Hebrew: דגנית בֶּרֶסְט; born 1949 in Petah Tikva) is an Israeli painter and photographer.

Berest is a conceptual artist. She is best known for her painting David and I (1973-1974) and Piano Line (1986-1987).

Berest was a recipient of the Sandberg Prize in 1993, the Dizengoff Prize in 2007, and the Rappaport Prize for Established Israeli Artist in 2012.

== See also ==
- Visual arts in Israel
