= Histadrut Art Studio =

Art academy in Tel Aviv in mandatory Palestine

Histadrut Art Studio הסטודיו לציור של ההסתדרות

Location
- Yavne Street, Tel Aviv; Tel Aviv, Israel

Information
- Other name: Frenkel's Art Studio
- School type: Art Studio
- Established: 1925 C
- Founder: Isaac Frenkel
- Closed: 1929 C
- Director: Isaac Frenkel

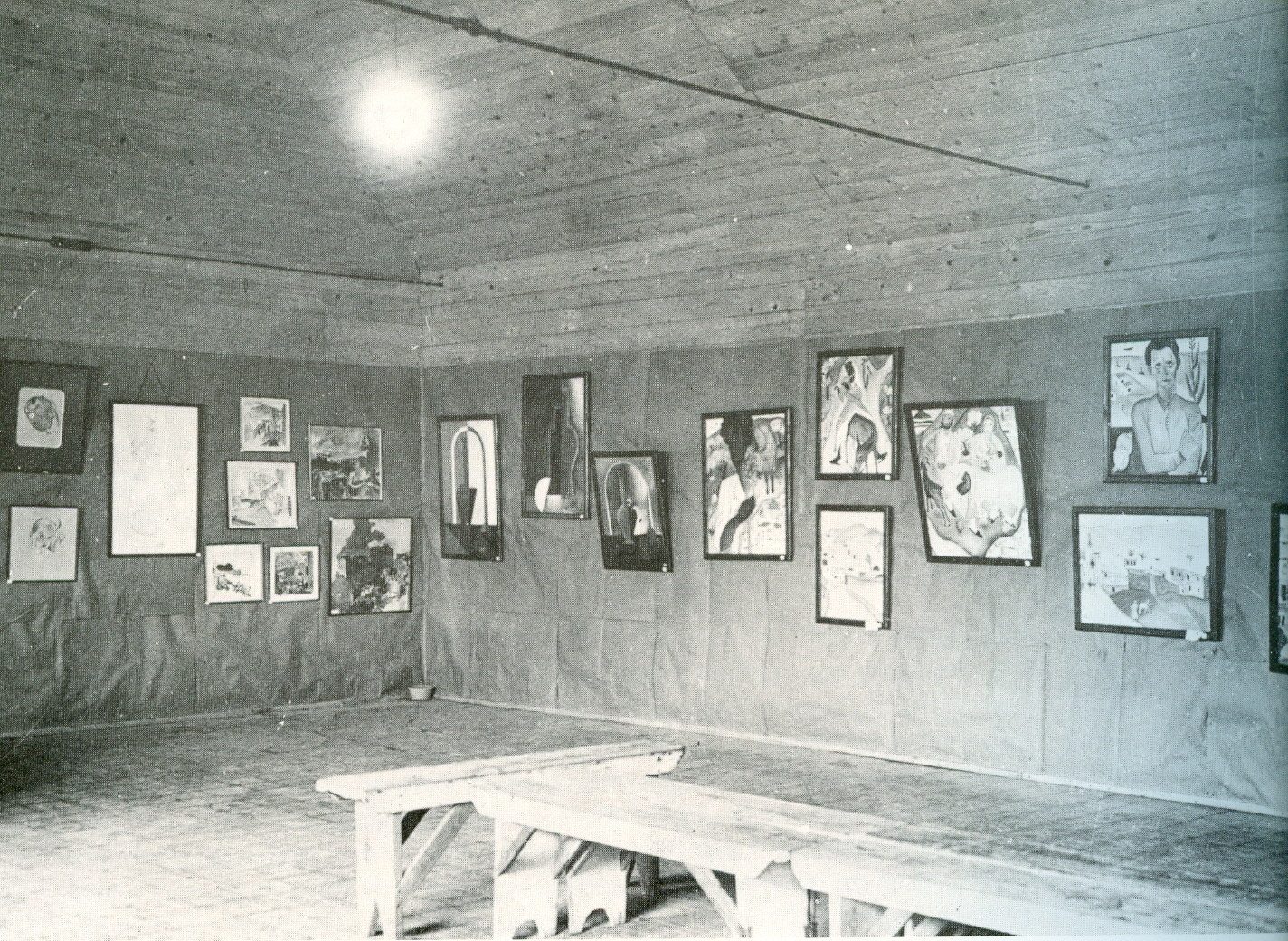
Modern Artists Exhibition at the Ohel Theatre, the Histadrut Art Studio played a major role in the exposition.

The Histadrut studio of art was the first art academy in Tel Aviv in Mandatory Palestine. Founded by Isaac Frenkel Frenel, it was active from 1926 to 1929. The Jewish labour union known as the Histadrut provided some funding and therefore the studio used the Histadrut name.

== History ==
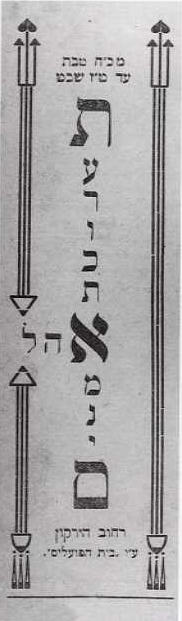
Modern Artists' exhibition, Ohel theatre, 1926

The art school was the first in Israel to adapt and teach modern art trends. It was particularly influenced by modern French art and the School of Paris. Isaac Frenkel, who studied in Paris, taught his students the modern Parisian art trends. Frenkel presented a modernist alternative to Bezalel's (a Jerusalem art school) Orientalist style. The art studio was one of many catalysts to Tel Aviv's rise in cultural prominence in the Yishuv; the studio's role was especially prominent in the sphere of art. Several Bezalel students would join the studio during the weekends in order to learn the new modern French art from Frenkel. These students include Moshe Castel, Avigdor Stematsky, Ziona Tagger, and, Yehezkel Streichman.

In September 1927 the studio was made up of 17 students of whom 6 were female. Due to the extreme poverty of his students, Frenkel did not even demand one grush in payment.

== Artistic Style and Teachings ==
The art studio emphasized the use of modern techniques in painting. Furthermore, at the studio, reproductions of Modern artists such as van Gogh, Degas, Cezanne and others were shown in the class. Some of these were the only reproductions of these artists available in Mandatory Palestine. Only 3 such reproductions were available in Tel Aviv in the beginning, one of van Gogh, of Cezanne and Gauguin. The school taught Post-Impressionism, unknown at the time in Mandatory-Palestine.

The artists were also exposed to the ideas and works of living artists, especially the Jewish artists of the Ecole de Paris, which include: Chaim Soutine, Michel Kikoine, Jules Pascin and others.

Frenkel, through his studio, encouraged the young students to travel to France following their studies in the studio. In the 1920s and 30s, a wave of students from the Histadrut Art studio left Mandatory Palestine to study in Paris, returning home a few years later and augmenting the influence of French art in the Jewish Yishuv.

== Exhibitions ==
Frenkel's studio participated in several major art exhibitions during the 1920s, including the Modern Artists Exhibition in the Ohel theatre and the tower of David exhibitions. In the Modern Artists' Exhibition they presented "New art" for a "New society".

The Histadrut Art Studio also presented its works in the Herzliya Hebrew Gymnasium, but several of the young artists were unable to frame their paintings due to their poverty.

== Students ==
- Shimshon Holzman
- Yosef Kossonogi
- Mordechai Levanon
- Arieh Navon
- Avigdor Stematsky
- Genia Berger
- Moshe Castel
- Yechekzel Streichman
- David Hendler

== See also ==
- Art in Tel Aviv
- Ha-Tomer
