= Dizengoff Prize =

Israeli art award

Dizengoff Prize for Painting and Sculpture
- Awarded for: painting and sculpture
- Country: Israel
- Presented by: Municipality of Tel Aviv-Yafo
- First award: 1934; 92 years ago
- Website: https://www.tel-aviv.gov.il/Pages/ItemPage.aspx?webId=f09859c7-1a46-40e0-8968-9ae31388b659&listId=229c1b0e-698e-4b08-af1e-e769ab00a112&itemId=6

The Dizengoff Prize for Painting and Sculpture is awarded annually by the Tel Aviv-Yafo Municipality since 1934.

The prize is named after Meir Dizengoff, the first mayor of Tel Aviv. According to the Tel Aviv municipality, the purpose of the prize is to turn Tel Aviv into a centre of Israeli art and culture.

== Recipients ==
The following is a table of Dizengoff Prize laureates in their respective art form:

Year	Painting	Sculpture
1934	Yitzhak Frenkel	
1937	Aharon Avni, Moshe Mokady, Arie Fein, Shimshon Holzman, Chaim Gliksberg	
1938	Alef Kahana, Nachum Gutman, David Hendler, Menachem Shemi, Meron Sima, Shmuel Ovadia, Arieh Allweil, Yitzhak Frenkel	Trude Chaim
1939	Pinchas Litvinovsky, Yishai Kulbiansky, Arieh Navon, Yitzhak Frenkel	
1940	Arie Orland, Miron Sima, Mordechai Levanon, Yitzhak Frenkel	Willy Levin, Jacob Brandenburg
1941	Moshe Castel, Chaim Schwarz, Avigdor Stematsky, Arie Aroch, Amiram Tamari	
1942	Moshe Mokady, Joseph Zaritsky, Menachem Shemi	
1943	Yisrael Paldi	Moshe Sternschuss
1944	Yechezkel Streichman, Arie Fein, Joseph Kossonogi	Batya Lishanski
1945–1946	Robert Bazer, Marcel Janco, Eliahu Sygard, Yohanan Simon, Moshe Castel, David Hendler, Esther Lurie	Yitzhak Danziger, Dov Feigin
1947–1948	Aharon Avni, Aliza Bak, Yitzhak Frenkel, Jakob Eisenscher, Yechiel Krize, Chaya Schwartz, Peretz Rozenfeld, Zvi Schorr	Aharon Priwer, Moshe Ziffer, Michael Karre
1950–1951	Marcel Janco, Moshe Mokady, Zvi Meirovitz, Menachem Shemi, Leon Isaacov, Yochanan Ben-Yaakov, Blanca Tauber, Moshe Proppes	Elul Kosso, Shoshana Heiman, Rudi Lehmann, Arie Resnik
1953	Shalom Sabba, Aharon Kahana, Yohanan Simon, Isidor Ascheim, Aviva Uri	Ze'ev Ben-Zvi
1954	Aharon Giladi, Yechezkel Streichman, Joseph Kossonogi	Yechiel Shemi
1956	Nachum Gutman, Chaim Glicksberg, Yosl Bergner, Avigdor Stematsky	Moshe Sternschuss
1957	Arieh Lubin, Leo Kahn, Naftali Bezem	Batya Lishanski
1958	Ephraim Lifshits, Mina Zisslman	Mordechai Pitkin
1959	Israel Paldi, Shraga Weil	Zahara Schatz
1960	Jean David, Elchanan Halperen, Chaya Schwartz	Aharon Priwer
1961	Yohanan Simon, Mordechai Levanon, Zvi Meirovitz, Mordechai Arieli	
1962	Yaakov Tesler, Yosef Halevi, Sima Slonim	
1963	David Meshullam	Zvi Aldouby
1964	Gershon Davidovitch, Yechezkel Kimchi, Reuven Rubin (honorary award)	
1965	John Byle	Buky Schwartz
1966	Tzila Naman, Kalman Hak	Rudi Lehmann, Pinchas Eshet
1967	Pinchas Abramovitz, Michael Gross	Shoshana Heiman
1969	Yechezkel Streichman, Kalman Hak	Robert Bazer
1976	Osias Hofstatter, Hava Mehutan, Oded Feingersh	Yaakov Loutchansky (honorary award), Ève Goldfarb-Borgese
1978	Eliahu Gat, Raffi Lavie	
1982	Avigdor Luisada, Lea Nikel	
1985	Uri Lifschitz	Yigal Tumarkin
1990	Shlomo Vitkin	Menashe Kadishman
1997	Michal Na'aman, Jan Rauchwerger	
2001	Michail Grobman, Drora Domini, Gil Shani	
2005	Pinchas Cohen Gan, Eli Petel	
2007	Dganit Berest (painting & photography)	Miri Segal (multidisciplinary)
2009	David Reeb	
2011	Arie Ben-Ron	Nahum Tevet
2013	Joshua Borkovsky, Simcha Shirman (photography)	
2015	Ido Bar-El, Nurit David	
2017		Uri Katzenstein

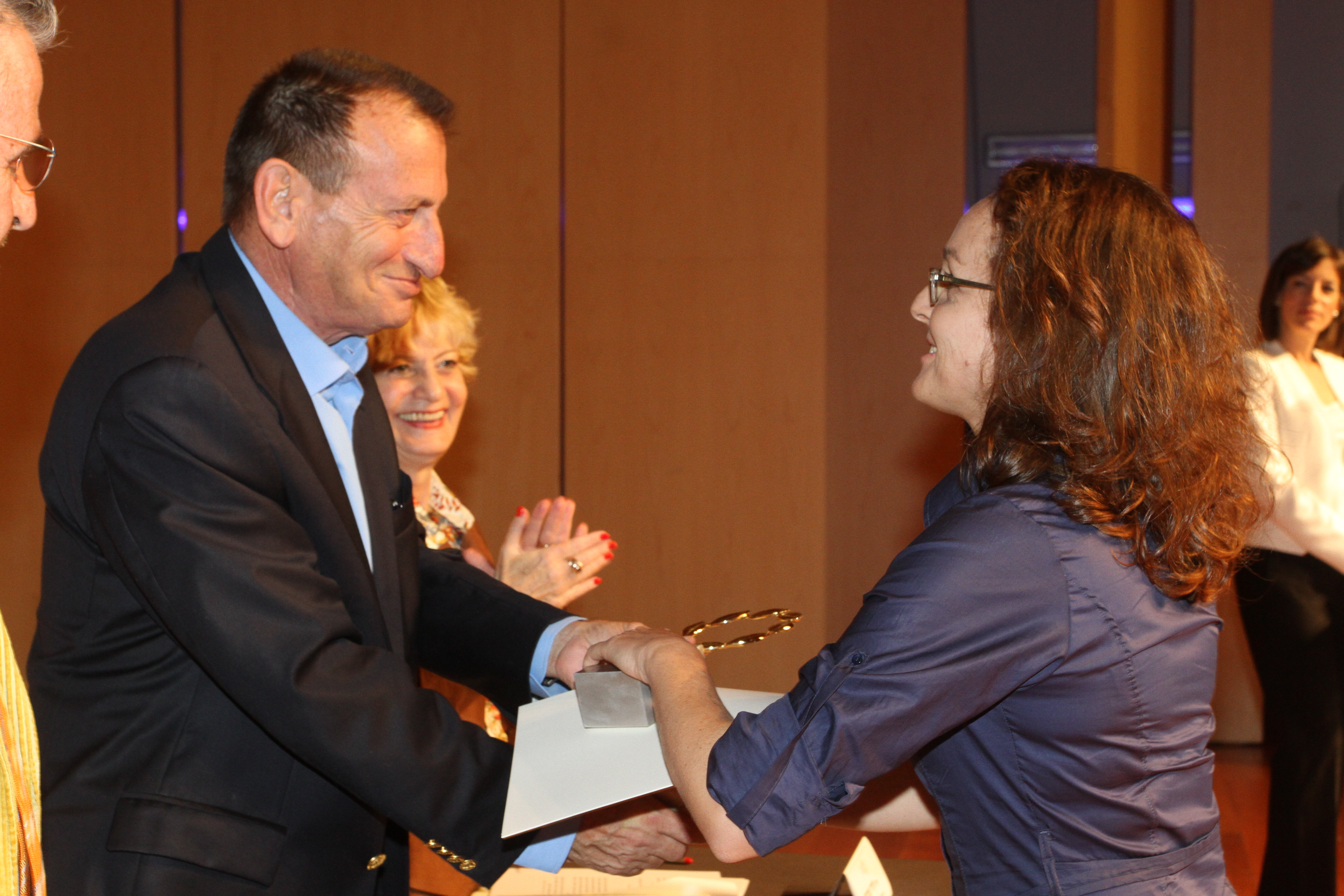
Ron Huldai awarding the Dizengoff prize, 2011

== See also ==
- Art in Tel Aviv
