= Moshe Mokady =

Israeli artist (1902–1975)

Moshe Mokady משה מוקדי
- Born: June 5, 1902; Tarnów, Poland
- Died: 1975; Ein Hod, Israel
- Education: Academy of Fine Arts Vienna
- Known for: Stage designer
- Movement: Israeli art

Moshe Mokady (Brandstatter) (Hebrew: משה מוקדי (ברנדשטטר); 1902–1975) is an Israeli artist.

== Biography ==
Mokady was born in Tarnów with the name Moshe Brandstatter, to Abraham and Helena Brandstatter. In 1914 his family moved to Vienna where he studied painting with Lazar Krestin until 1916. in 1916 Mokady moved to Zürich and studied music and the piano. In 1920 Mokady immigrated to the Mandate Palestine with his family, initially settling in Haifa. During the years 1922–1923 he continued his art studies in the Academy of Fine Arts Vienna. He lived in Paris during the years 1927–1933 where he continued studying art. Mokady returned to the Mandate Palestine in 1933, living in Jerusalem and then Tel Aviv. He co-directed a school for drawing and painting in Jerusalem between the years 1933–1935 and in 1949 became the Director of the Art Department of the Ministry of Education and Culture. He was the first Director of the Avni Institute of Painting and Sculpture in Tel Aviv. (1952–1965).

From 1934 to 1958 Mokady worked as a stage designer for the Habimah, Cameri and the Ohel Theaters. He received the Dizengoff Prize for painting in 1937, 1942, and in 1951. Mokady had 38 solo exhibitions and participated in numerous group shows in Israel and abroad. In 1952 he was one of the three Israeli painters who represented Israel in the Venice Biennale and again in 1958. Mokady was one of founders of the artist's village of Ein Hod where he moved in 1965 until his death in 1975.

Mokady married Verem, with whom he had one son, Refael Mokady, who died during the Six-Day War. A few years later the couple divorced. Following the divorce, Mokady married Haddie and had two children, Michael and Nina.

Mokady died in Ein Hod in 1975. A retrospective of his works was held at the Tel Aviv Museum of Art in 1999.

== Awards and recognition ==
- 1935 First Prize, competition for planning the grave of Hayim Nahman Bialik
- 1937 Dizengoff Prize for Painting and Sculpture
- 1942 Dizengoff Prize
- 1950 Award for the best painting, Israeli Artist exhibition, Washington, USA
- 1951 Dizengoff Prize for Painting and Sculpture, Tel Aviv Museum of Art, Municipality of Tel Aviv-Yafo
- 1958 Award from Mr. Mellen, exhibition celebrating the first decade of Israeli art, Safed

== Education ==
- 1914–20 Vienna and Zurich, art and music
- 1922–23 Academy of Fine Arts Vienna
- 1927–33 Paris, art

== Teaching ==
- 1933–35 School for Painting and Drawing, Jerusalem
- 1952–65 Director of Avni Institute, Tel Aviv

== See also ==
- Visual arts in Israel
