= Leo Kahn =

Leo Kahn may refer to:

- Leo Kahn (painter)
- Leo Kahn (entrepreneur)
