= Esther Lurie =

Israeli painter (1913–1998)

- אסתר לוריא
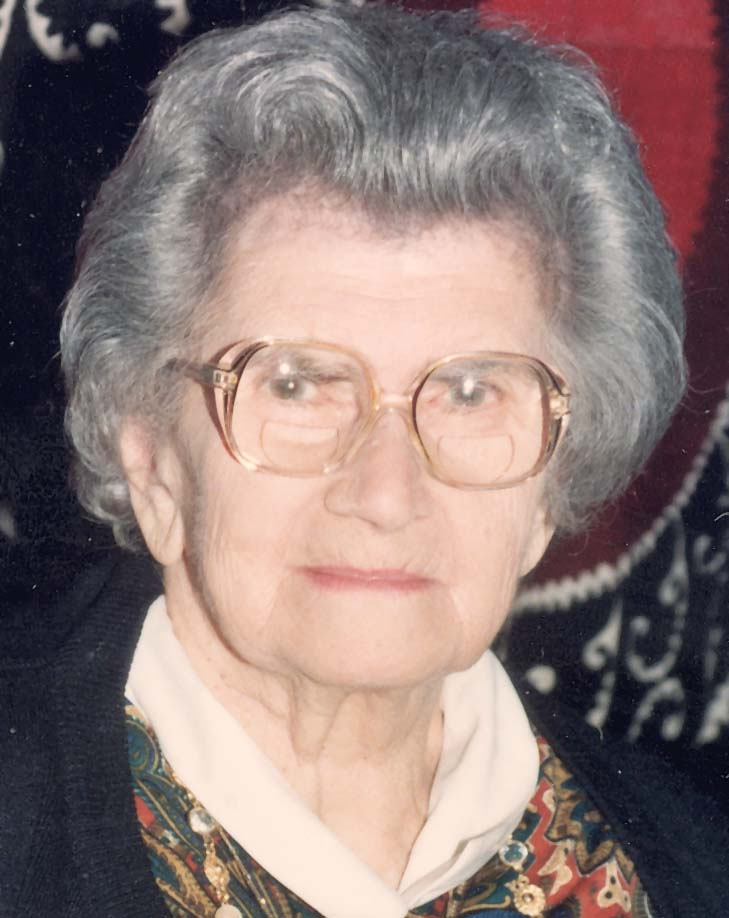
- Lurie in the 1980s
- Born: 1913; Liepāja, Latvia
- Died: 14 February 1998 (aged 84–85); Tel Aviv, Israel
- Resting place: Yarkon Cemetery
- Education: Institut des Arts Décoratifs (La Cambre); Royal Academy of Fine Arts
- Known for: Painting; documenting the Kovno Ghetto
- Notable work: The Palestine Orchestra (1938); Young Woman with the Yellow Patch; Jewesses in Slavery (1945)
- Children: 2
- Awards: Dizengoff Prize (1938, 1946)

Esther Lurie (Hebrew: אסתר לוריא; 1913 – 14 February 1998) was an Israeli painter.

After studying theatre set design and drawing in Belgium, and immigrating to Palestine in 1934, Lurie obtained work by painting and exhibiting her art in Tel Aviv. In 1941, while residing with family in Kovno, she was deported to the Kovno Ghetto during the German occupation of Lithuania. While imprisoned at the Kovno Ghetto, and later the Stutthof and Leibitsch concentration camps, she continued to paint and draw art, both under the surveillance of the Germans and clandestinely.

After the war, in 1945, Lurie published reproductions of her artwork in the sketchbook Jewesses in Slavery. Her sketches and watercolours documenting the Holocaust also served as part of the testimony in the 1961 trial of Adolf Eichmann.

She is a two-time recipient of the Dizengoff Prize—she received it first in 1938, for The Palestine Orchestra, and again in 1946, for Young Woman with the Yellow Patch.

== Early life and education ==
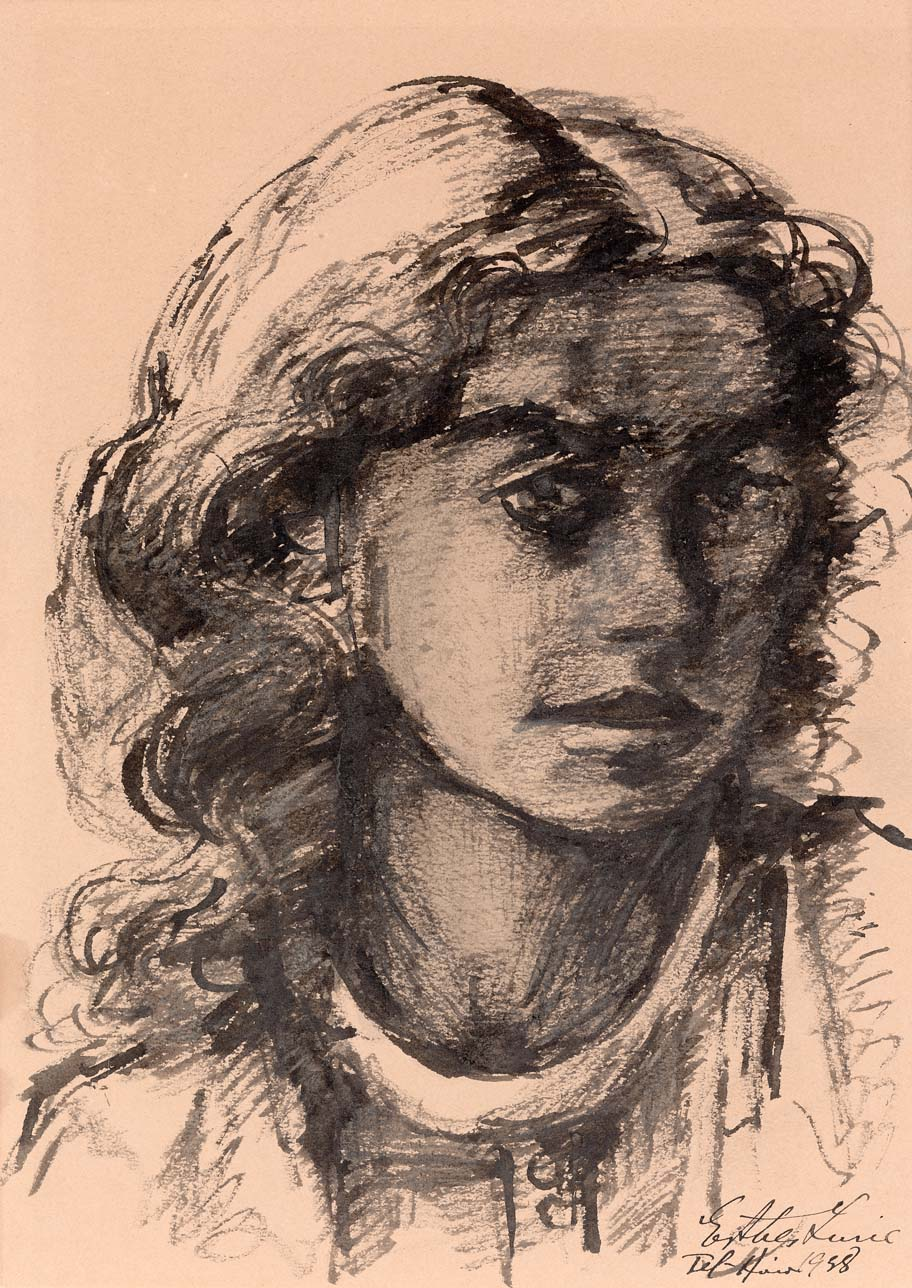
Self-portrait drawn in the 1930s

Born in Liepāja in 1913, Lurie was one of five children in a religious Jewish family. She studied at the Ezra Gymnasium in Riga, a Hebrew day school, and developed her artistic talent from the age of fifteen. She continued refining her talents by studying theatre set design at the Institut des Arts Décoratifs (later known as La Cambre) and drawing at the Royal Academy of Fine Arts in Belgium from 1931 to 1934.

== Career ==
Lurie immigrated to Palestine in 1934. There, she painted backdrops for the Adloyada parade, the Levant Fair, and the Hebrew Theatre in Tel Aviv, in addition to drawing. She won the Dizengoff Prize for Drawing in 1938, for The Palestine Orchestra, and was accepted into the Painters and Sculptors Association of Palestine later that year.

Lurie was especially inclined to depict musicians and dancers in her artwork. She held an exhibition of her work at the Cosmopolitan Art Gallery in Tel Aviv in 1938. The exhibit included Dancing, a painting which art critics praised and said it highlighted her developing artistic talent. After returning to Belgium to continue her studies, she moved to Kovno to help her sister Mouta and Mouta's son Reuben. She held several art exhibitions in Kovno before the German invasion of Lithuania in June 1941, including an exhibition at the Royal Opera House in 1940, where many of her works were bought by local Jewish institutions and the Kovno State Museum.

== Imprisonment during the Holocaust ==
Lurie was deported to the Kovno Ghetto, where she lived from 1941 to 1944. The ghetto's Judenrat learned of her artistic talent and arranged for her to create realistic depictions of life in the ghetto, in lieu of forced labour. She formed a collective of artists to work to that end, whose members included Josef Schlesinger, Jacob Lifschitz, and Ben Zion Schmidt. Under the order of the Germans, she painted portraits commissioned by German commanders as well as reproductions of masterpieces.

After receiving special permission to draw in the pottery workshop, Lurie asked Jewish potters to prepare ceramic jars that she could use to secure her artwork. She eventually used the jars to bury more than 200 works of clandestinely drawn art under her sister's house in 1943. When the ghetto was liquidated in July 1944, she was deported to the Stutthof concentration camp and then to the Leibitsch forced-labour camp at Lubicz, near Toruń, where she continued her work documenting life within ghettos. While a prisoner at Stutthof, she was asked by women to secretly draw their portraits in exchange for sliced bread.

None of the 200 original works that Lurie buried in the Kovno Ghetto were recovered. However, photographs of her original artwork were taken beforehand for the Kovno Ghetto's archive. Eleven of her sketches and watercolours, and twenty of these photographs of her works were hidden in crates buried underground by Avraham Tory on behalf of the ghetto's Judenrat, which he took to Israel after the war. She used these photographs to reproduce most of her other works from the war.

== Post-war career ==
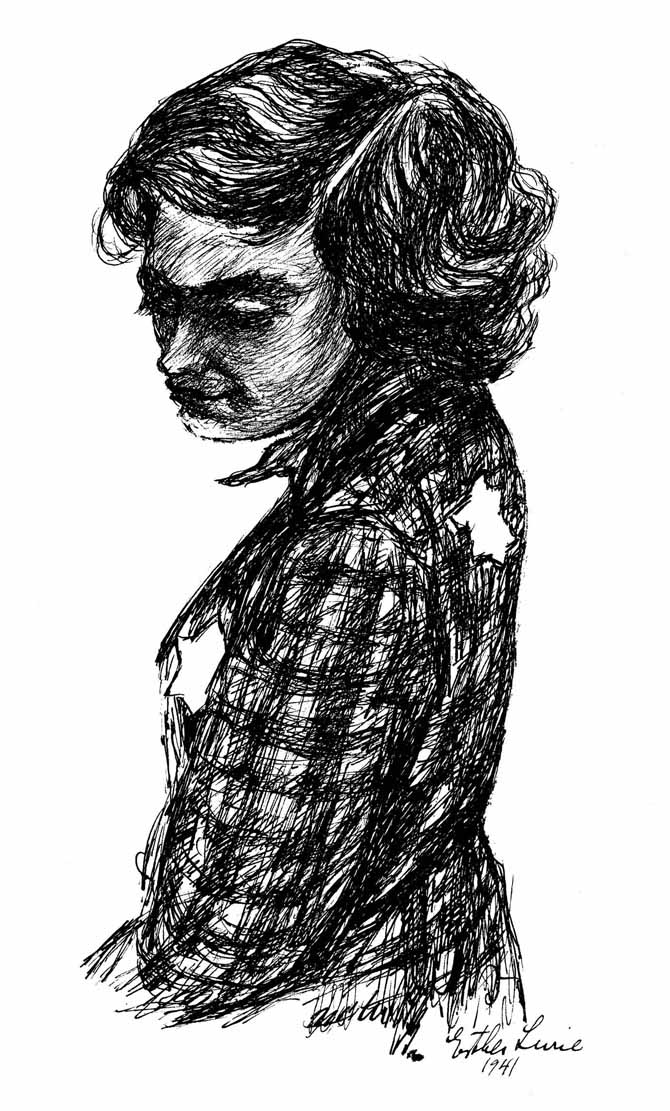
Young Woman with the Yellow Patch (c. 1941 – c. 1943)

Lurie was liberated by the Red Army in January 1945. Two months later, she reached a camp of Jewish soldiers from Palestine fighting in the British army in Italy. For the camp's military song and dance performances, Lurie created stage backdrops. She also authored a sketchbook titled Jewesses in Slavery, after an exhibition of drawings was organized by the painter Menahem Shemi, a soldier in the camp. The sketchbook, published by the Jewish Soldiers' Club of Rome, collected reconstructions of the works she drew at the Leibitsch camp.

Lurie returned to Palestine in July 1945. There, she married and had two children. While raising her family, she continued to paint and exhibit her work in Israel and abroad. In 1946, she again won the Dizengoff Prize with her sketch Young Woman with the Yellow Patch, which she drew in the Kovno Ghetto.

Prior to the Eichmann trial in 1961, in an interview with Maariv, she said, "I am a local Israeli painter. It's time I stopped being the Ghetto Painter." Although she was not required to testify in the trial herself, her sketches and watercolors documenting the Holocaust were approved by the Supreme Court of Israel for their documentary value and served as part of the testimony.

Lurie donated much of her work from the time of the Holocaust, which can be found in the collections of the Ghetto Fighters' House and Yad Vashem in Israel, both memorials to the Holocaust.

After the Yom Kippur War, her work mainly focused on depicting landscapes, especially that of Jerusalem. She died in Tel Aviv, Israel, in 1998.
