= Amiram Tamari =

Israeli illustrator and artist (1913–1981)

Amiram Tamari עמירם תמרי
- Born: 1913; Hadera, Greater Syria, Ottoman Empire
- Died: 1981 (aged 67–68)
- Education: Académie de la Grande Chaumière
- Known for: Painting
- Movement: Israeli art
- Awards: Dizengoff Prize for Painting

Amiram Tamari (Hebrew: עמירם תמרי; 22 March 1913 – 3 July 1981) was an Israeli illustrator and artist. Tamari was a Dizengoff Prize winner for painting in 1941.

== Biography ==
Amiram Tamari was born in the spring of 1913 in Hadera, the son of Tzipora and Michael Tamari-Teitelman, Hapoel Hatzair. Growing up in Tel Aviv, he studied at the Académie de la Grande Chaumière and the Académie Julian in Paris.

Tamari's oil paintings focused on landscapes of Eretz Yisrael in an abstract style. Tamari won the Dizengoff Prize for Painting in 1941. in addition, Tamari illustrated children's books published by Gadish Publishers, including the book "Hasamba Street Fighting in Gaza", which was published in 1957.

He taught painting at the Levinsky College of Education and at the Dugma School in Tel Aviv.

He was married to Chana née Schleselberg and had a daughter, Maya, born in 1947.

== Awards and recognition ==
- 1941–1942 Dizengoff Prize for Painting and Sculpture
- 1943 Dizengoff Prize for Painting and Sculpture, Municipality of Tel Aviv-Yafo
- 1944–1945 First Prize for Painting, Egypt
