= Yeva Sculptor =

Yeva Goldfarb-Borgese
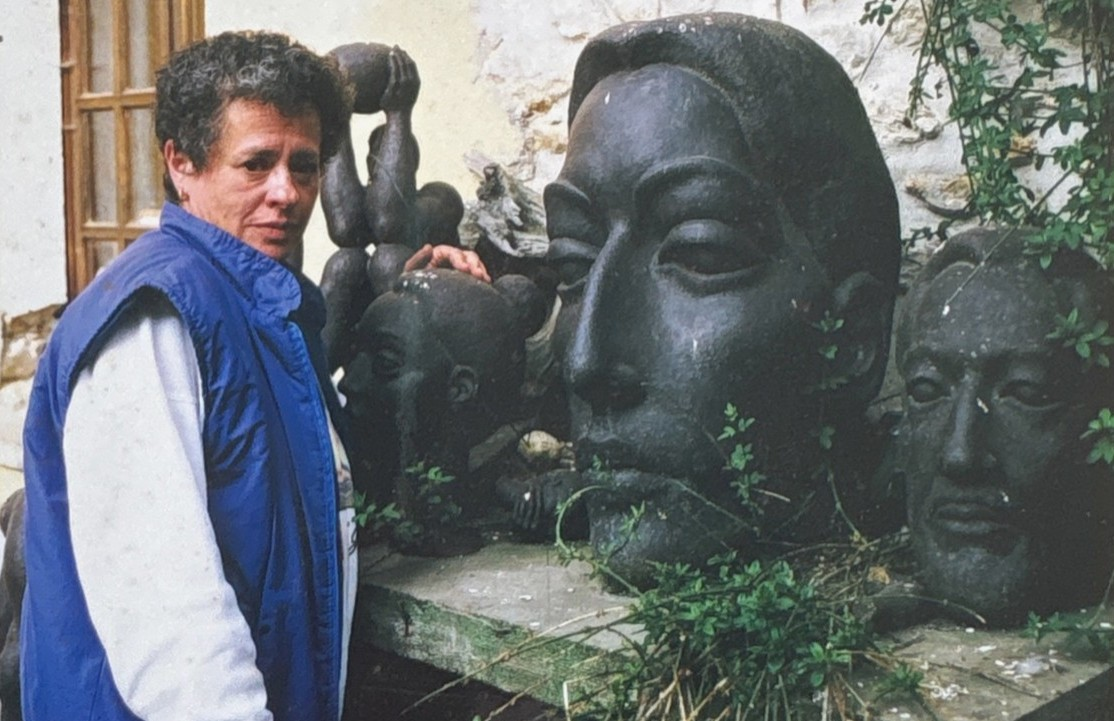
- Denonville (1987)
- Born: 1951 (age 74–75); Zhytomyr, Ukrainian SSR, Soviet Union
- Other name: Yeva
- Known for: Sculpture
- Website: yeva-sculpteur.fr

Yeva Goldfarb-Borgese (born 1951), professionally known as Yeva, is an Israeli-French sculptor.

== Biography ==
Goldfarb-Borgese was born in 1951 in Zhytomyr, then part of the Ukrainian Soviet Socialist Republic, Soviet Union. She received her artistic education at the studio of Naum Ostashinsky in Kyiv.

In 1973, Goldfarb-Borgese immigrated to Israel and settled in Tel Aviv. By the end of 1974, she had completed more than twenty bronze sculptures and wall reliefs. Her first solo exhibitions in Tel Aviv received positive reviews in the Israeli press.

The Jerusalem Post described her as a young sculptor whose works dealt with themes of suffering, endurance, and the human figure, noting her artistic talent and potential. The Hebrew newspaper Davar praised her fresh artistic approach and psychological depth. The French-language Le Journal d'Israel described her work as both expressionist and surrealist. In 1975, her first solo exhibition catalogue was published in Tel Aviv. In 1976, her exhibitions were presented in Italy, France, and the Netherlands. In October 1976, a solo exhibition opened at Engel Gallery in Jerusalem. The Jerusalem Post Magazine described her as "a young and very gifted Israeli sculptor" with a highly individual style. She later moved to France, where she continued her artistic career under the name Yeva.

== Artistic style ==
Yeva works primarily in bronze, terracotta, stone, and mixed media. Her work focuses on figurative sculpture, exploring the human body, movement, and emotional states. French art critics noted the dialogue between material, emptiness, and spatial composition in her work. Her works have appeared on the international art market and are listed in professional art databases.

French critics emphasized the tension between mass, space, and emotional expression in Yeva's work. The French writer and member of the Académie française, Henri Troyat, wrote:

Her sculptures seem to emerge from a permanent dialogue between matter and emptiness, between the inner strength of form and the space that surrounds it.

— Henri Troyat (1911–2007), member of the Académie française,

Her works immediately struck me, from the very first glance, as extraordinarily talented and profoundly serious. I would even say that it is astonishing how this small, slender young woman — with unexpectedly heavy, large masculine hands — works with such difficult materials as bronze and cast iron... How this young sculptor managed to express in her works despair and sorrow — the full depth of despair and the full depth of grief — with such extraordinary poignancy, conviction and restraint.

— Alexander Galich — Russian poet, playwright, screenwriter and singer-songwriter

== Awards and honours ==
In 1976, Goldfarb-Borgese received the Dizengoff Prize for young artists awarded by the municipality of Tel Aviv.

- 1977 – exhibition at the Galerie Larock-Granoff in Paris.

Later distinctions include:

- 1983 – Bronze Medal of Arts-Sciences-Lettres, Paris
- 1986 – Rubens Prize, Antwerp
- 1995 – Grand Prix and Petit Prix de Rome, Rambouillet
- 1999 – Édouard Leduc Prize, Paris
- 2000 – E. M. Sandoz Prize, Paris
- 2005 – Gaumont Prize of the Institut de France
- 2007 – Medal of Honour of the Society of French Artists
- 2023 – Sculpture Prize, Dourdan Art Salon

== Gallery ==
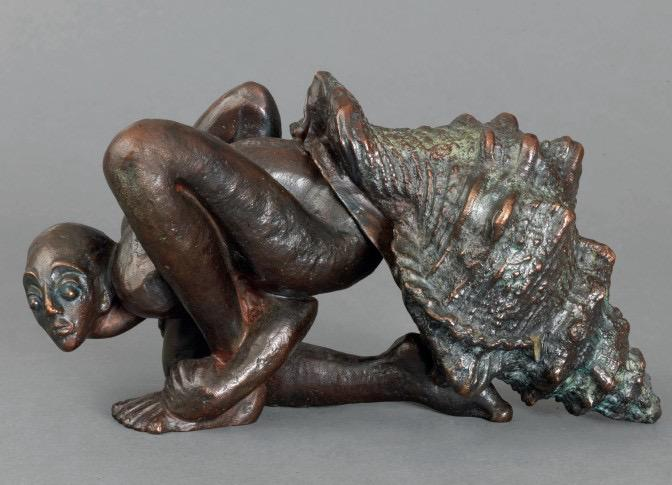
YEVA SCULPTOR «Woman in a Seashell»

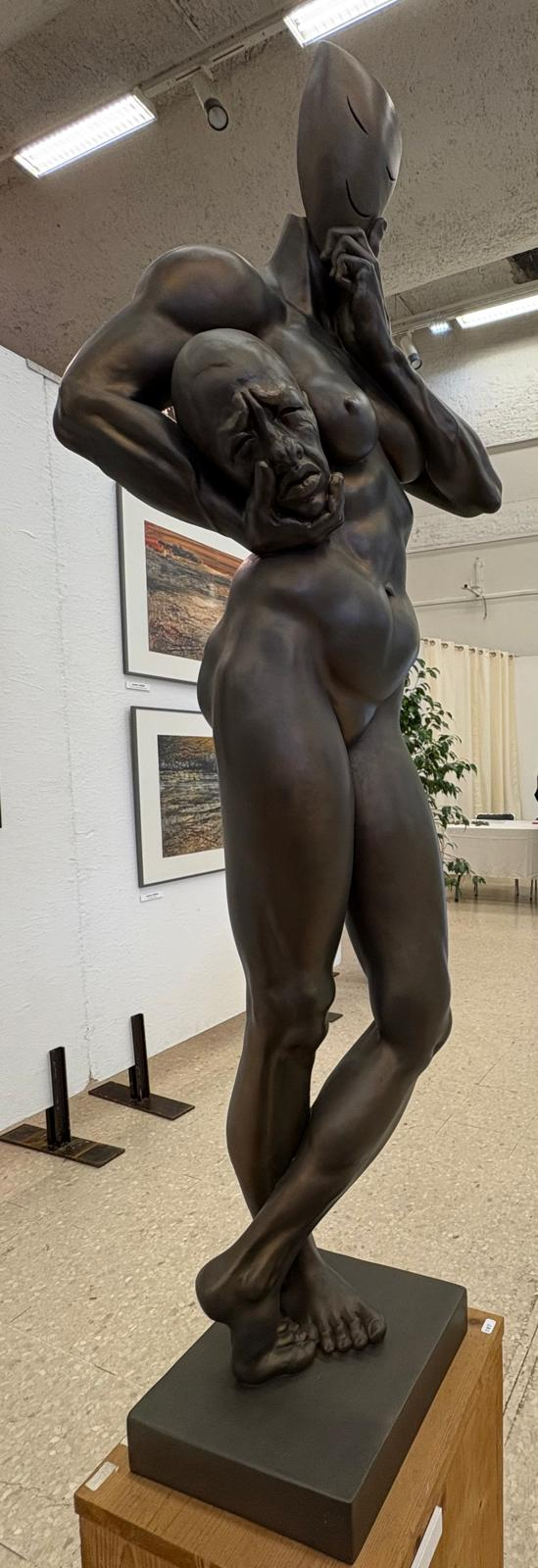
YEVA SCULPTOR «Mask»

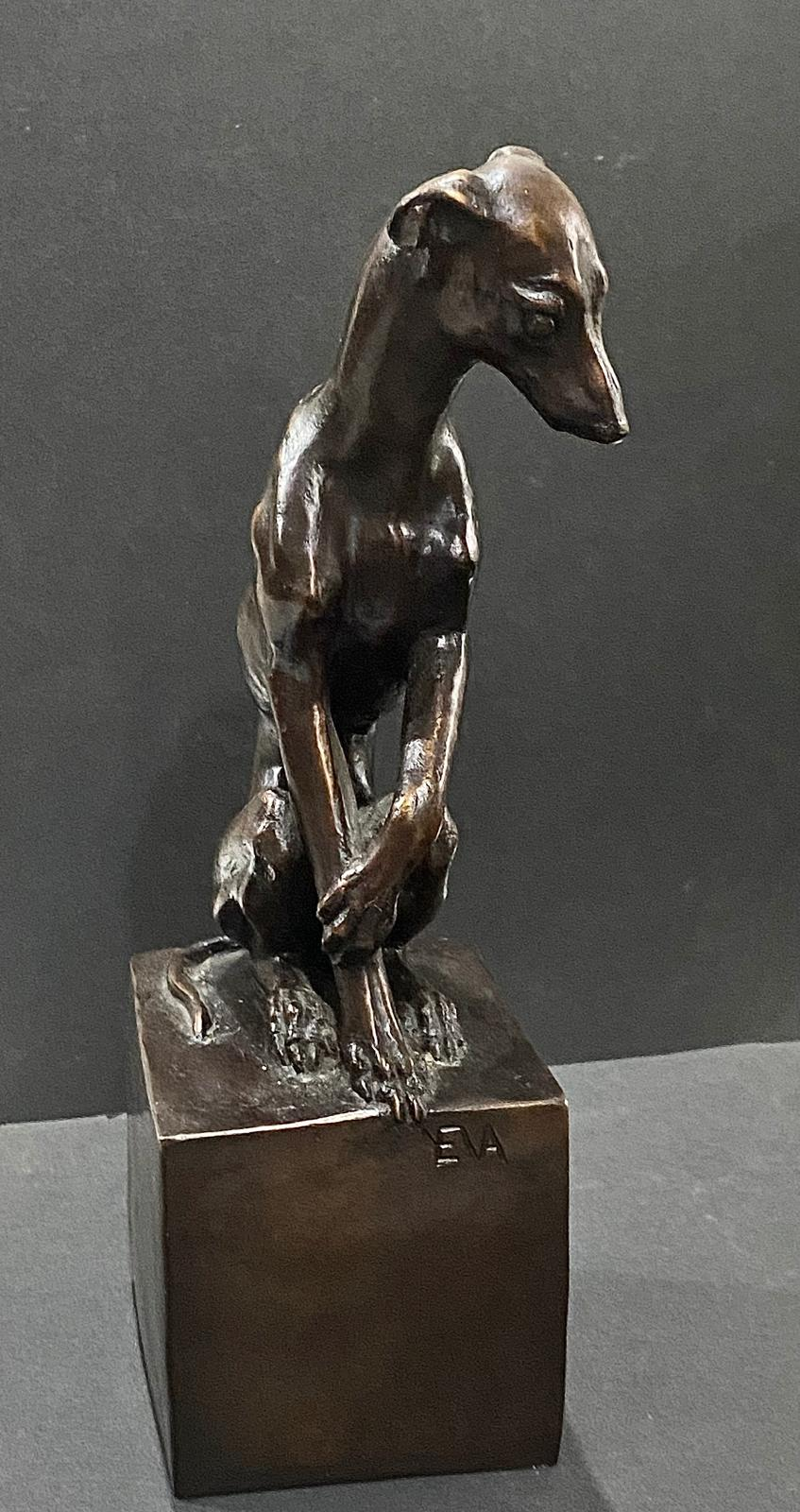
YEVA SCULPTOR «Italian Greyhound on a Cube»

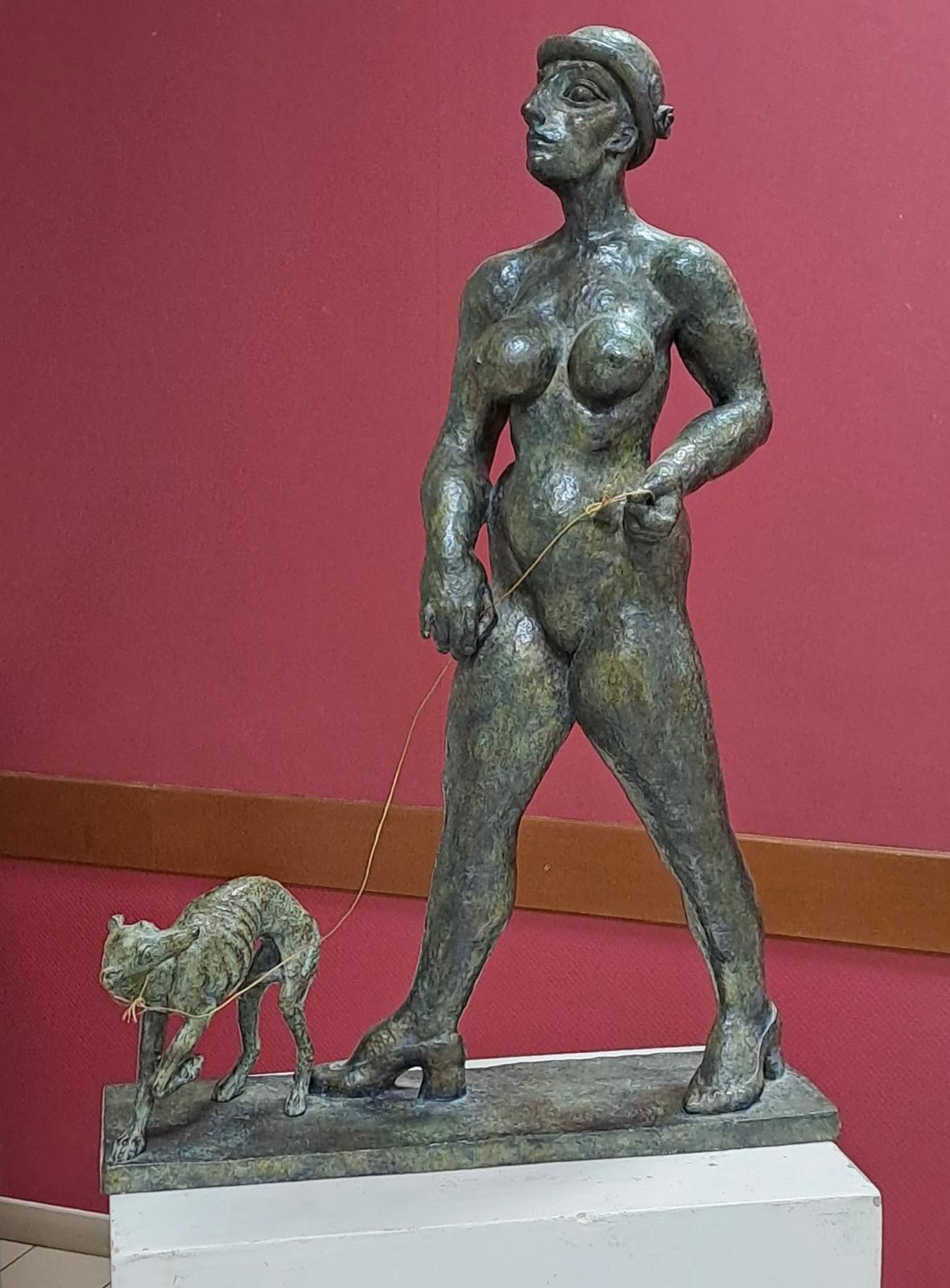
YEVA SCULPTOR «Dame de Longchamps»
