= Isidor Ascheim =

German painter (1891–1958)

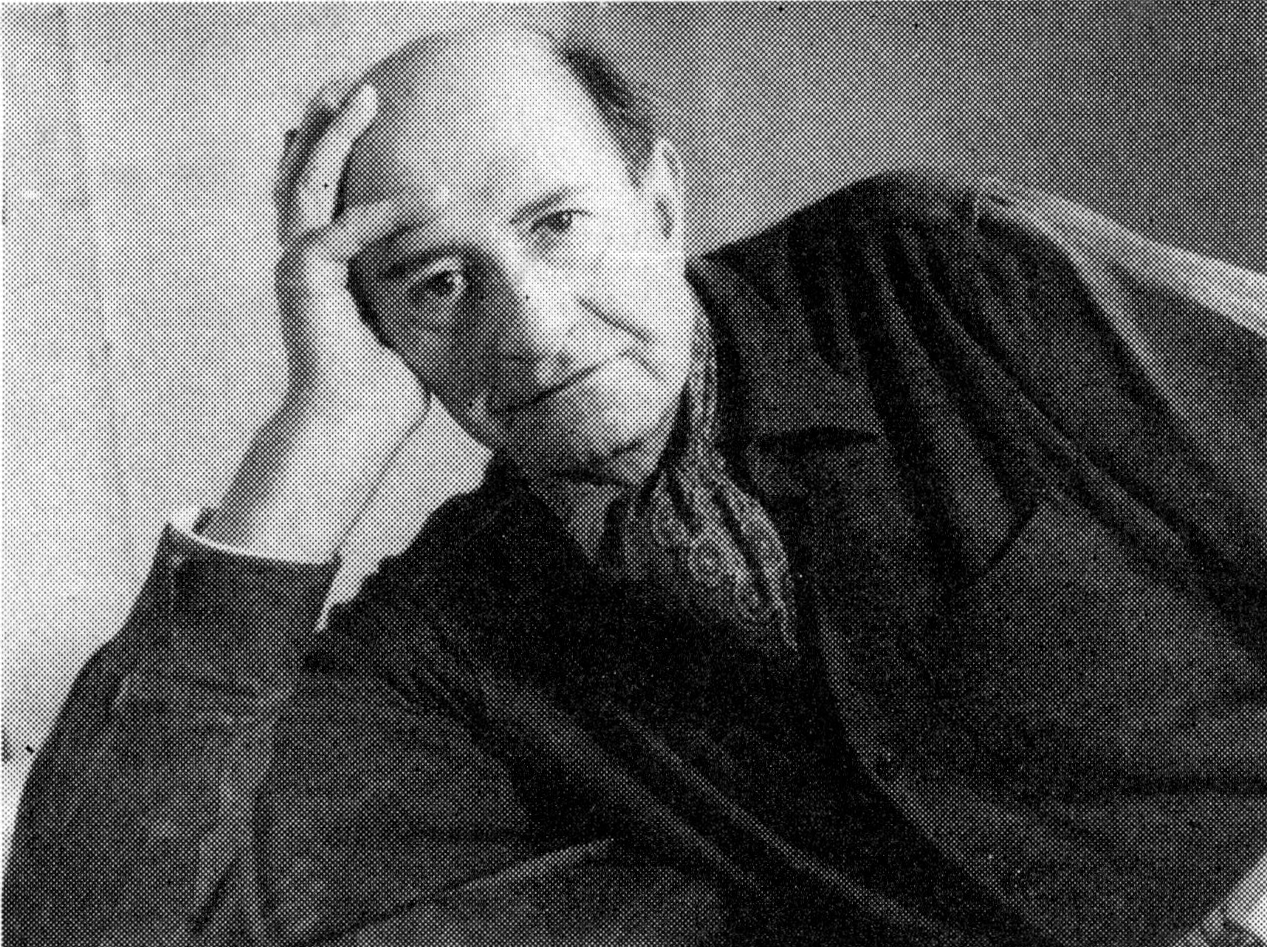
Isidor Ascheim

Isidor Ascheim (Hebrew: איזידור אשהיים; 1891–1968) was a German-born Israeli painter and printmaker. He is known for his work within the German Expressionist movement and his later contributions to Israeli art. Born in Margonin (present-day Poland), he studied in Breslau and was influenced by artists of the Die Brücke group. In 1940, he immigrated to Mandate Palestine, where he became an important figure in the Jerusalem art scene, notably teaching and later directing the Bezalel School of Arts and Crafts. His artistic output reflects a connection to nature and the human form, often executed with a dark palette characteristic of his German Expressionist roots

== Biography ==
Isidor Ascheim was born in Margonin (present-day Poland) in 1891. He was raised in an Orthodox Jewish family and served during World War I. In 1919–23, Ascheim studied under the German Expressionist Otto Mueller in Breslau and was influenced by Erich Heckel of the Die Brücke (The Bridge) group. He immigrated to Mandate Palestine in 1940 and settled in Jerusalem. He was married to the Israeli painter Margot Lange-Ascheim.

== Artistic career ==
He taught at the Bezalel School of Art and served as its director for several years. Ascheim's art is based on a direct impression of nature, life and the human form. His oeuvre represents a continuous connection with nature and the human figure, usually executed with a dark palette, the legacy of his German Expressionist roots.

== Awards and recognition ==
- In 1953, Ascheim was a co-recipient of the Dizengoff Prize for Painting.
- In 1955, he received the Jerusalem Prize for Art.
- In 1956, he participated in the Venice Biennale.

== Selected collections ==
- Fine Arts Museum of San Francisco
- Israel Museum, Jerusalem
