= Leo Kahn (painter) =

German painter (1894–1913)

Leo Kahn, Still Life, oil on canvas

Leo Kahn (Hebrew: ליאון כהן; 1894–1983) was a German-Israeli painter.

== Biography ==
Kahn was born in 1894 in Bruchsal, Germany. He served in the German army in 1914, then studied at the Academy of Fine Arts in Karlsruhe between 1919-1920 under the tutelage of Albert Hueinsen. Kahn travelled to Berlin (where he met and befriended Max Liebermann), Holland, and France in search of artistic inspiration. In 1926, he was commissioned for the decoration of an important synagogue in Bruchsal. Kahn exhibited in Karlsruhe, Munich, Ulm, Zurich, and Paris. In 1928, Kahn lived in the south of France where he befriended the important Fauve artist André Derain. He then moved to Paris where he maintained a studio until 1934.

Kahn emigrated to Israel in 1936, settled in Ramat Gan and founded Israel's first textile printing factory.

In 1960, he moved to Safed's Artist Colony.

He is primarily remembered as a landscape, still life and portrait artist, and the influence of Paul Cézanne is deeply felt in his work.

== Awards and honours ==
- In 1950, Kahn participated in the Venice Biennale.
- In 1957, he was a co-recipient of the Dizengoff Prize for Painting.
- In 1982, he was made Worthy of the City of Ramat Gan.

== Selected exhibitions ==
- 2008/2009: Bruchsal, Townhall, Die entscheidende Tat des Malers Leo Kahn: Erinnerung an den Künstler der Bruchsaler Synagogenausmalung
- 2001: Museum of the Holocaust, Los Angeles: Kaleidoscope: Works From the Collection of David Malek
- 1981: Ulmer Museum, Germany (major retrospective)

== Selected collections ==
- Israel Museum, Jerusalem
- Museum of the History of Łódź, Poland
- Tel-Aviv Museum of Art
