= Moshe Ziffer =

Israeli artist (1902–1989)

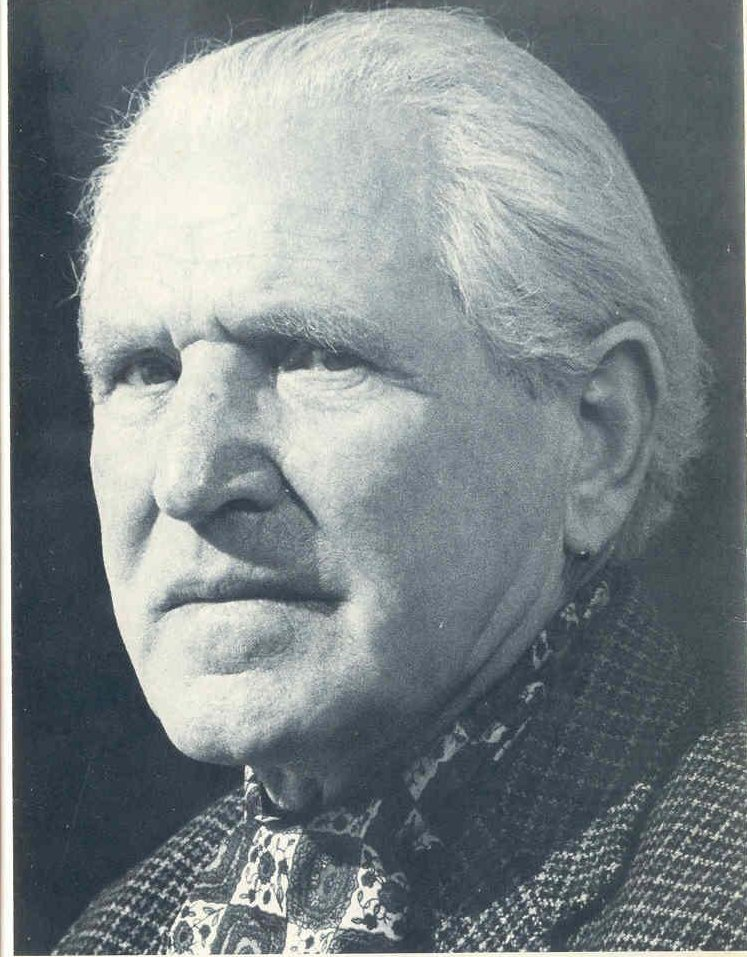
Moshe Ziffer

Moshe Ziffer (Hebrew: משה ציפר; 24 April 1902 – 9 April 1989) was an Israeli artist and sculptor.

== Biography ==
Moshe Ziffer was born in 1902 in Przemyśl, Austria-Hungary. He immigrated to Mandate Palestine in 1919. He arrived on the Ruslan along with other figures of Israeli culture including the painter Yitzhak Frenkel, the historian Joseph Klausner and the architect Yehuda Megidovitch. In 1924–33, he studied sculpture in Vienna, Berlin and Paris. Stone sculptures by Ziffer are on display at the campuses of Tel Aviv University and the Hebrew University of Jerusalem. Ziffer bequeathed his sculpture garden in Safed to the Safed Municipality. He left his home in Tel Aviv and many of his sculptures to Tel Aviv University.

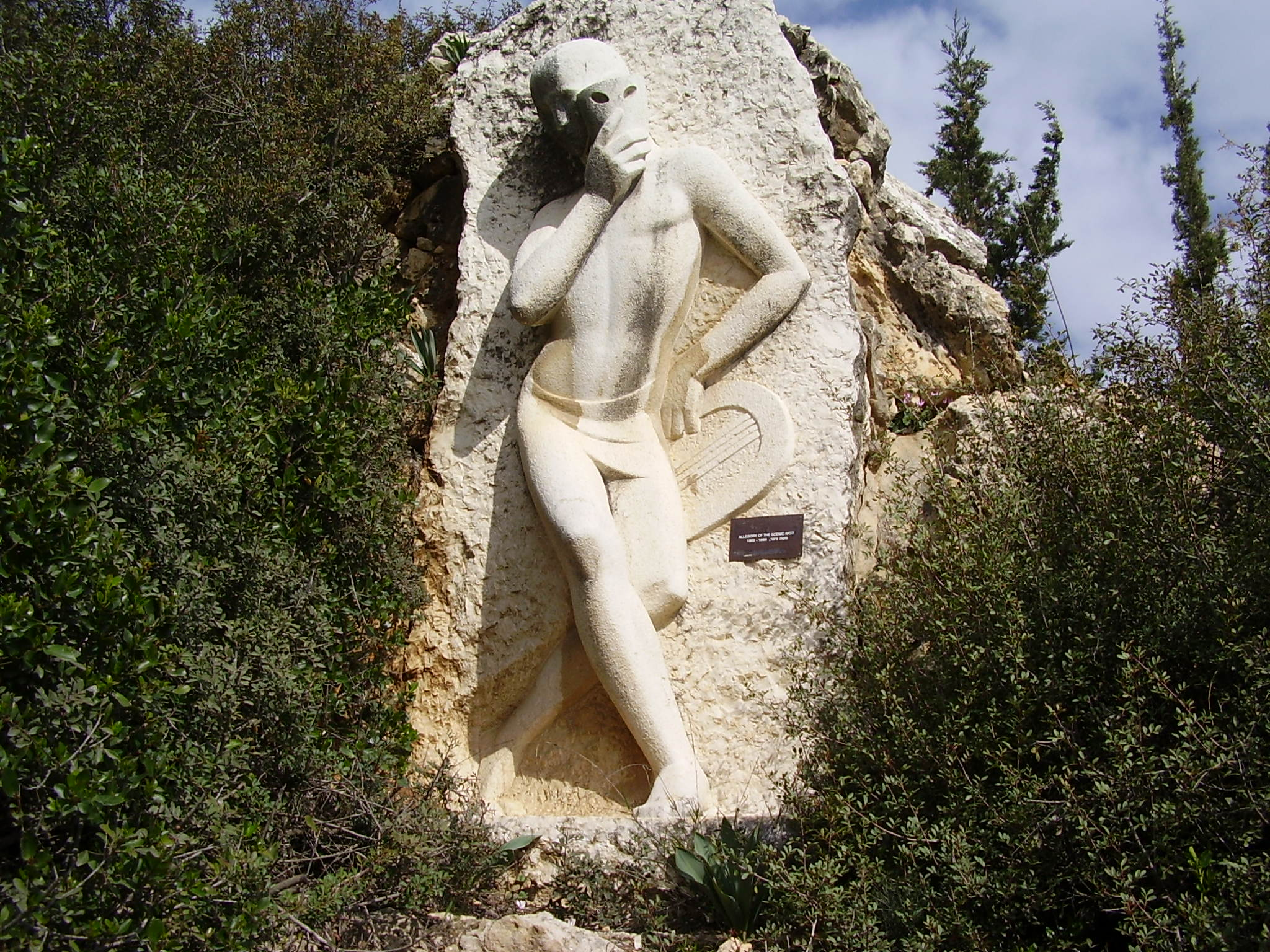
Allegory of the Sciences, Moshe Ziffer

Ziffer died in 1989 in Tel Aviv.

== Awards and recognition ==
Albert Einstein said of Ziffer:"Du bist ein Ziffer und ich bin Ein stein aber du arbeitest mit stein und ich arbeite mit ziffern" ("You are a figure (ziffer—figure, digit, number) and I am a stone (ein stein) but you work with stone and I work with figures"). Einstein also described his work as "simple and noble as the man who created it."

In 1947–48, Ziffer was awarded the Dizengoff Prize in Sculpture, for his design of a wall at Haganah House, Tel Aviv.

== Environmental sculptures ==
- 1938, "Unknown Pioneer", at New York International Fair
- Memorial in honour of the breakthrough at the Burma Road, Hulda
- Memorial in honour of the fighters of the Givati Brigade and members of Kibbutz Nitzanim killed in the 1947–1949 Palestine war,
- Sculpture Garden, Safed
- 1958, "Lot's Wife", Brussels International Exhibition

== Portrait busts ==
Ziffer sculpted busts of Albert Einstein, David Ben-Gurion and Chaim Weizmann.
