= Yohanan Simon =

German-born Israeli painter (1905–1976)

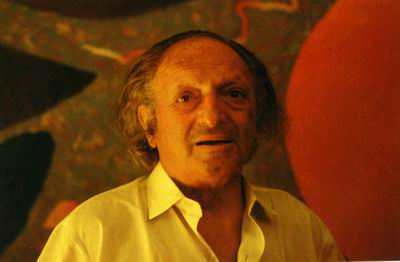
- Born: יוחנן סימון; November 3, 1905; Berlin, Germany
- Died: January 31, 1976 (aged 70); Tel Aviv, Israel
- Education: Academy of Fine Arts, Munich
- Known for: Painting
- Movement: Israeli art
- Awards: Dizengoff Prize

Yohanan Simon (Hebrew: יוחנן סימון; November 3, 1905 – January 16, 1976) was a German-born Israeli painter.

== Biography ==
Yohanan Simon, painter was born in 1905, Berlin. From 1927 he lived mainly in France. Beginning in 1934 he worked in New York for the magazine Vogue. In 1936 he immigrated to Mandate Palestine. Until 1953 he was a member of Kibbutz Gan Shmuel. He executed a number of murals for Israeli ships, public buildings and hotels, including Bank of Israel offices in New York and a hotel in Côte d'Ivoire. He also illustrated books and designed stage sets.

== Education ==
- Max Beckmann Art School, Frankfurt
- Academy of Fine Arts, Munich
- 1931–34 École des Beaux-Arts, Paris

== Awards and prizes ==
- 1945–46 The Dizengoff Prize for Painting and Sculpture, Municipality of Tel Aviv-Yafo, Tel Aviv
- 1951 Congress of Jewish Culture Prize, New York City
- 1952 Zichron Yaakov Prize
- 1953 The Dizengoff Prize for Painting and Sculpture, Municipality of Tel Aviv-Yafo, Tel Aviv
- 1956 Israel Olympic Committee Prize
- 1958 Ramat Gan Prize
- 1960 Histadrut Prize
- 1961 The Dizengoff Prize for Painting and Sculpture, Municipality of Tel Aviv-Yafo, Tel Aviv

== Outdoor and Public Art ==
- 1951 Congress of Jewish Culture, New York City
- 1956 Israel Olympic Committee

== Selected exhibitions ==
- 1948 Venice Biennale
- 1958 Venice Biennale
- 1953 São Paulo
