= Tarnowa, Łódź Voivodeship =

Tarnowa
- Village
- Location within Poland
- Coordinates: 51°54′5″N 19°1′30″E
- Country: Poland
- Voivodeship: Łódź
- County: Poddębice
- Gmina: Poddębice

Tarnowa [tarˈnɔva] is a village in the administrative district of Gmina Poddębice, within Poddębice County, Łódź Voivodeship, in central Poland.
