= Arieh Navon =

Israeli painter (1909–1996)

Arieh Navon אריה נבון
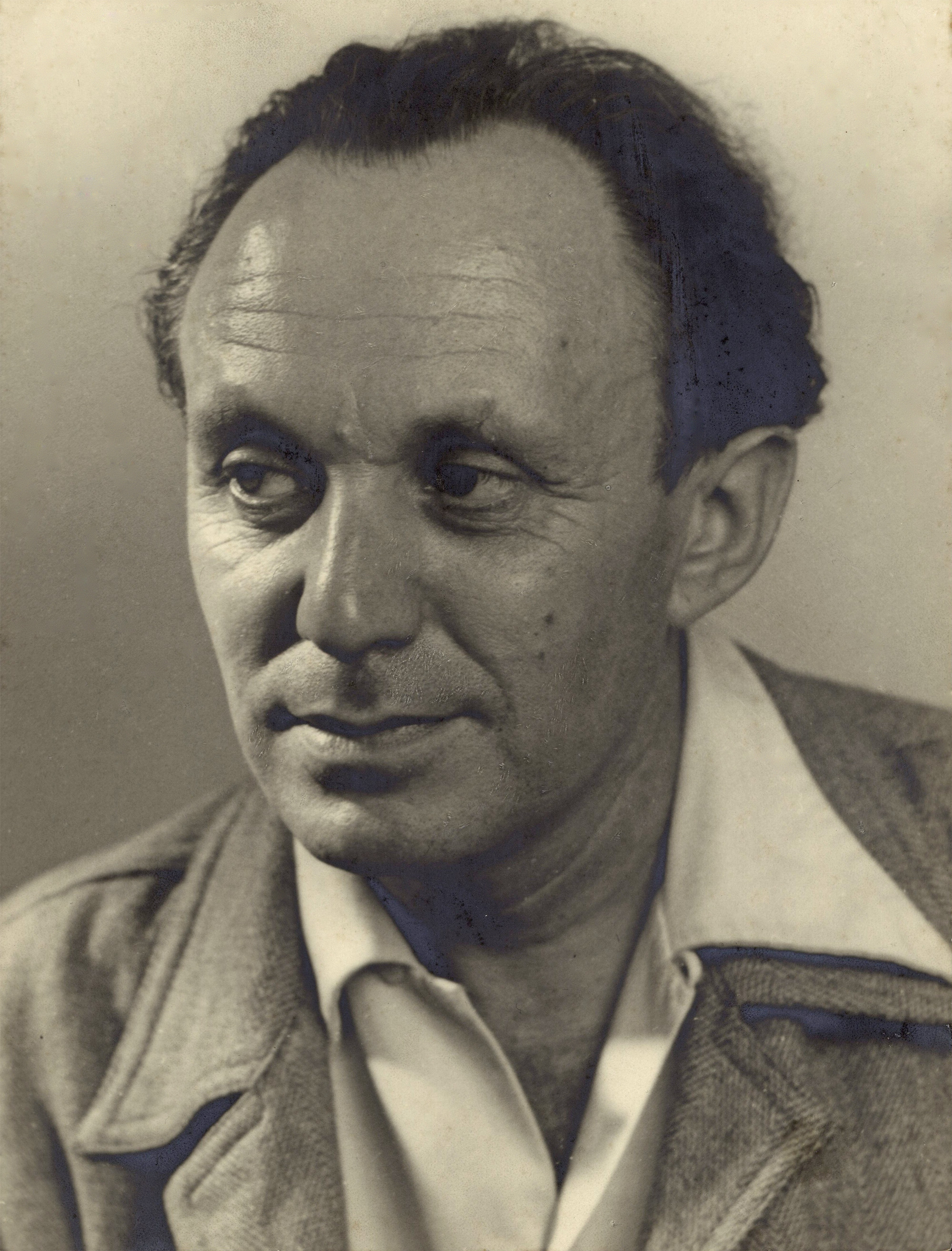
- Born: Arieh Kligman; May 22, 1909; Dunaivtsi, Podolia Governorate, Russian Empire
- Died: November 29, 1996 (aged 87)
- Education: Isaac Frenkel's art studio
- Known for: Cartoons, paintings
- Awards: Israel Prize, Dizengoff Prize

Arieh Navon (né Kligman) (Hebrew: אריה נבון; May 22, 1909 – November 29, 1996) was a Russian-Israeli painter and illustrator, the first cartoonist in the Yishuv. He was also a set designer, comic artist and book illustrator. Winner of the Israel Prize for Performing Arts in 1996.

== Biography ==
=== Early life and education ===
Navon was born as Arieh Kligman in 1909 in the town of Dunaivtsi (now modern-day Ukraine), the son of Malka, daughter of Rabbi Yitzhak Meir of Ostburg, and Moshe HaCohen son of Yitzhak Kligman. He immigrated to Israel with his family in 1919 (age 10) on the ship "Ruslan". Studied art in Yitzhak Frenkel's studio in Tel Aviv in the late 1920s.

=== Career and art ===
He has hundreds of paintings, mostly drawings in ink or charcoal, and dozens of portraits of public figures, writers, actors and artists. A selection of them appears in his book "Records". A film based on his drawings called "The Way of a Singer in the Desert" was created in 1956, in collaboration between him and Yaakov Agam and Aryeh Mambush. He taught drawing at the Avni Institute and the Oranim Kibbutz Seminary. Navon participated in many exhibitions in Israel and around the world. A solo exhibition was held for him at the Israel Museum in 1978.

Eli Eshed suggests that a cartoon by Navon published in Davar on May 7, 1948, showing an old couple of Palmachniks telling tales to their grandson, was an inspiration to the famous song Hayu Zmanim.

He died in Tel Aviv in 1996, at the age of 87, and is buried in the Yarkon Cemetery.

A collection of letters sent to him is preserved in the National Library.

== Awards and recognition ==
In 1975, he was selected by the International Theatre Institute as one of the 13 outstanding and innovative theater artists for the years 1970-75 (alongside director Peter Brook and others).

- Dizengoff prize for painting (1938, 1939)
- Twice the Jerusalem prize for painting (1941, 1944)
- Kinor David award (1967)
- Meir Margalit Prize for Theatre (1978)
- Israel Prize for Performing Arts in 1996.

== Family ==
From 1970, he was married to Latah née Tzipkevich. His son is the recipient of the Israel Prize in Psychology, Professor David Navon. His older brother was the educator Shmuel Navon. Another brother, Zev Navon, was also an artist and a painting teacher. Another brother was named Chaim.

== See also ==
- Yitzhak Frenkel
- Israel Prize
- Yaakov Agam
- Dizengoff Prize
