= Sandberg Prize =

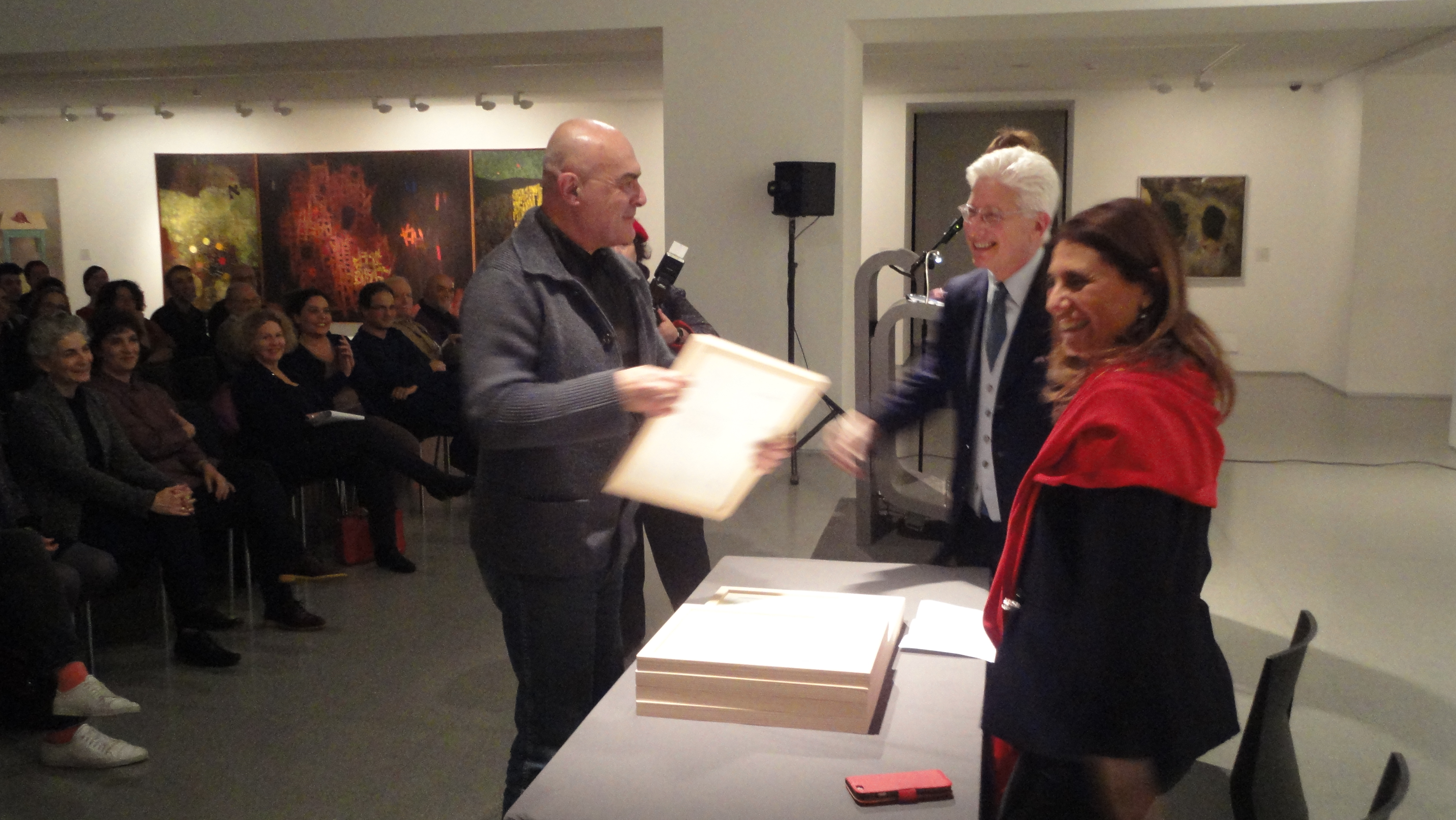
Sandberg Prize ceremony, Israel Museum, 2014

The Sandberg Prize for Israeli Art refers to a prize for art and design awarded at the Israel Museum, Jerusalem, with a particular focus on Israeli art. The prize was inaugurated in 1968 with funds from an anonymous New York–based donor. The prize is named in honor of Willem Sandberg, who served between 1964 and 1968 as chairman of the Executive Committee of the Israel Museum, which opened in 1965.

== History ==
The Sandberg Prize Foundation was established with a 75 thousand dollar fund which was earmarked for the purchase of Israeli art, and to be awarded to artists for their work. The anonymous donor requested to honor the work that Sandberg had done to promote Modern Art in Israel and with the intention of supporting the proliferation of art in Israel.

Joseph Zaritsky was the first artist to be awarded the prize 2 January 1968. The panel of judges for the prize included Sandberg and Yonah Fisher. The prize was given to Zaritsky for the 1964 painting which paid homage to Jan Vermeer. In the many interviews that followed the prize, Zaritsky stressed that the artwork has an independence of its own and "it is not permissible to look at a painting and see more than what is there", he explained "an artists should not imagine beyond what he sees. What he sees is what there is. A painting is not a dream".

On December 3, 1968, the Sandberg Prize was awarded to Yigal Tumarkin for Sculpture and Arie Aroch for Painting.

In addition to the prize a Sandberg Research Grant was awarded over the years from the Department of Design and Architecture at the Israel Museum.

== Notable recipients ==
- 1969 Yitzhak Danziger
- 1972 Moshe Kupferman
- 1975 Anna Ticho
- 1976 Yechiel Shemi
- 1977 Michael Gross
- 1978 Menashe Kadishman
- 1979 Pinchas Cohen Gan
- 1980 Micha Ullman
- 1985 Dov Feigin
- 1987 Motti Mizrachi
- 1989 Yaacov Kaufman
- 1991 Israel Hershberg
- 1999 Pesach Slabosky

For a complete listing see here

== See also ==
- Visual arts in Israel
