= Simcha Shirman =

Simcha Shirman שמחה שירמן
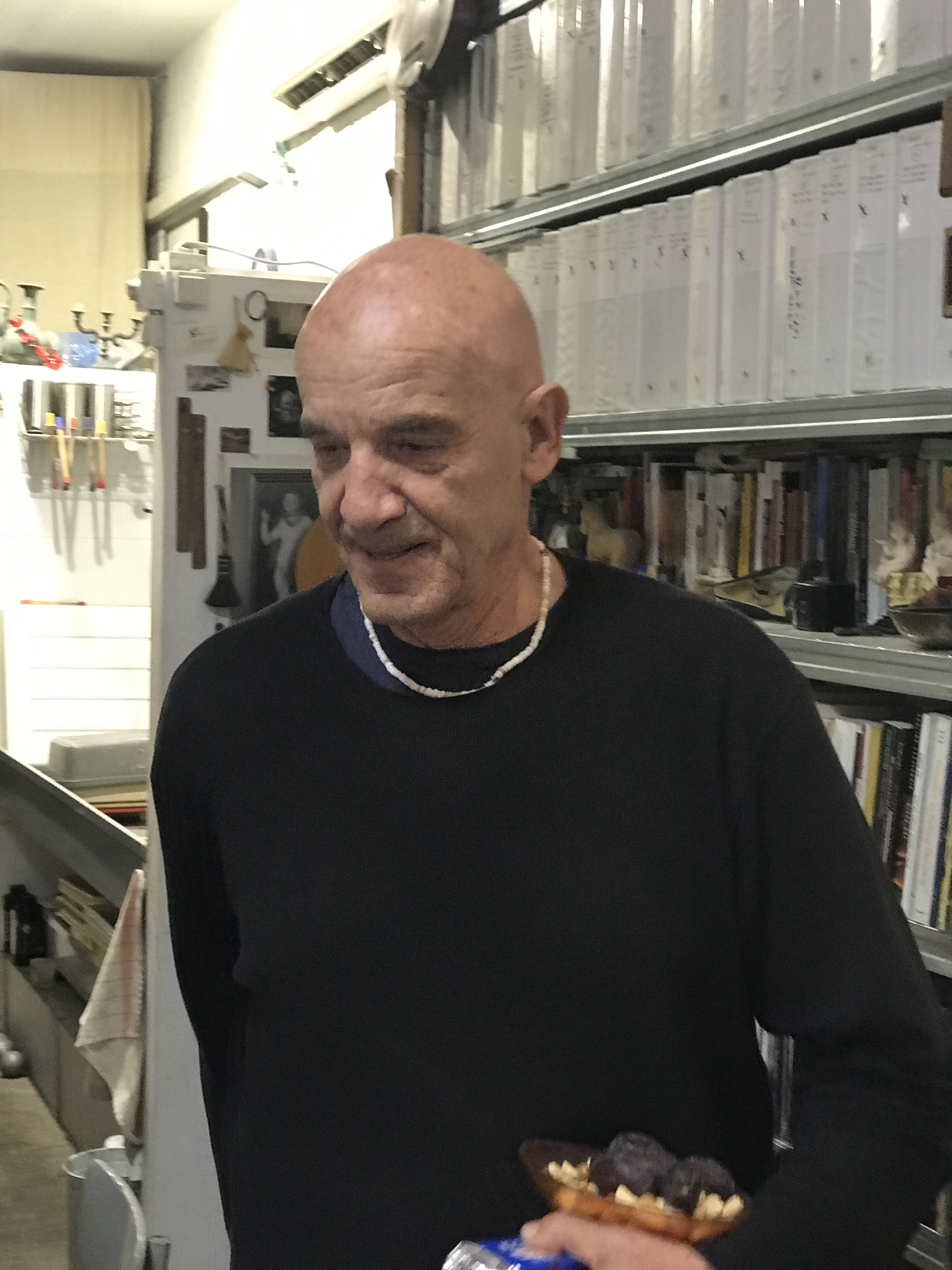
- Simha Shirman in his studio in Tel Aviv
- Born: 1947 (age 78–79); Germany
- Known for: Photography

Simcha Shirman (Hebrew: שמחה שירמן; born 1947) is a German-born Israeli photographer and educator.

== Biography ==
Simcha Shirman was born in 1947 to Batya and David, both Holocaust survivors. He was born in Saint Ottilien Convent, which was converted by USA occupation authorities to a soldier and refugee hospital after WWII. His birth certificate states that he is a displaced person. The family immigrated to Israel in May 1948 and settled in the city of Acre.

Shirman got is first camera when he was 12. A relative from America who visited Israel gave it to him. At age 15, Shirman set up a photography lab in a bathroom.

Shirman did his military service in 1965 in the Shaked patrol unit, as an officer and commander.

In 1970, Shirman went to New York to study photography. In 1972, he began his undergraduate studies at the School of Visual Arts. In 1976, he continued his graduate studies at the Pratt Institute, where he studied with Arthur Fried, and met and befriended Philip Perkis.

Upon graduation in 1978 and receiving an MFA in photography and art, Shirman returned to Israel with his family to the city of Tel Aviv.
