= Yehezkel Streichman =

Lithuanian-born Israeli painter (1906–1993)

Yehezkel Streichman יחזקאל שטרייכמן
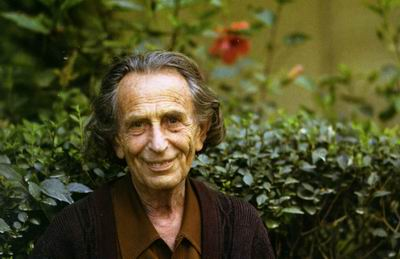
- Born: 1906; Kovno, Russian Empire
- Died: January 12, 1993 (86 years old); Tel Aviv, Israel
- Movement: Modernist "New Horizons" group; French "lyrical abstraction"
- Elected: President; Israeli Artists and Painters Union

Yehezkel Streichman (Hebrew: יחזקאל שטרייכמן; 1906 – January 12, 1993) was an Israeli painter. He is considered a pioneer of Israeli modernist painting. Among the awards that he won were the Dizengoff Prize and the Israel Prize.

== Biography ==
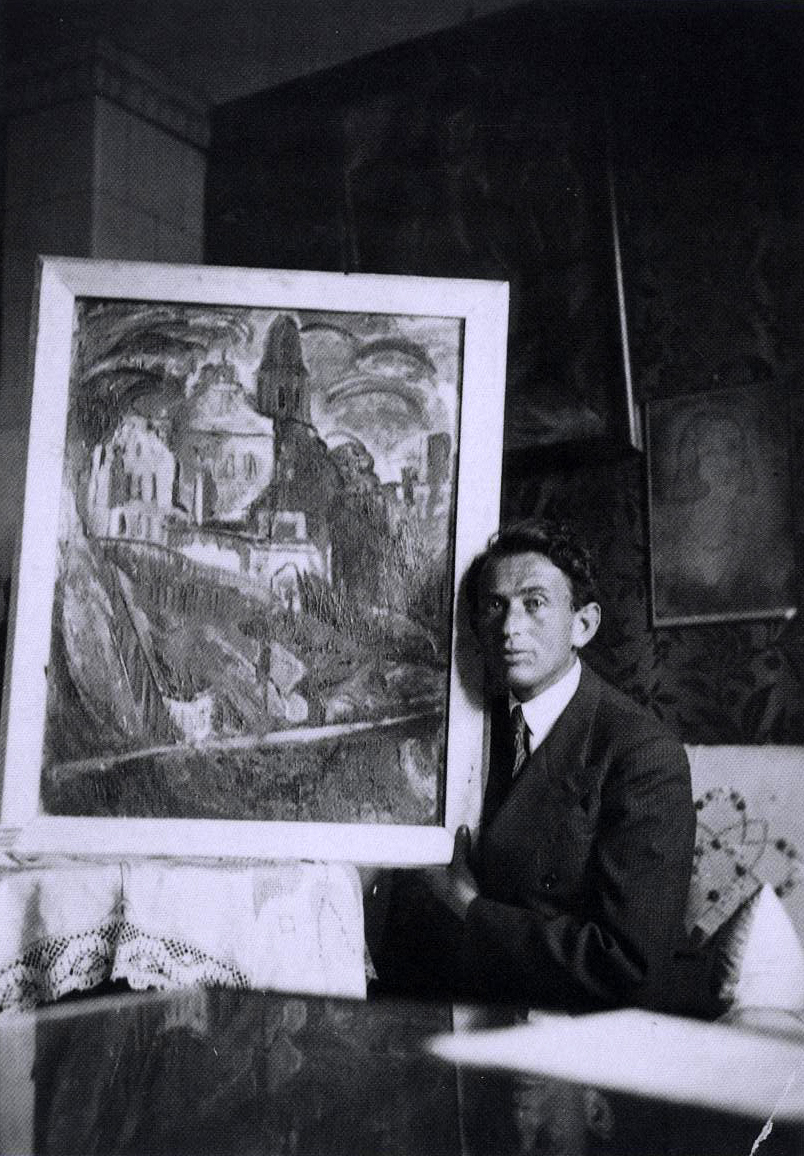
Streichman, after the 1930s

Yehezkel Streichman was born in Kovno, Russian Empire (now Lithuania). He studied at the local gymnasium, was a member of Hashomer Hatza'ir, and emigrated to Israel in 1924.

== Art career ==
Streichman studied at the Bezalel Academy of Art and Design with Arie Aroch in 1924–27. He also studied under Yitzhak Frenkel in the Histadrut Art Studio in Tel Aviv. He, like other students of Frenkel followed his advise to complement their studies in Paris. Thus he left for France, completing his studies in Paris at the École des Beaux-Arts (1927) and in Florence at the Academy of Art (1928–31). He taught painting throughout his life; in elementary and high schools in 1936, at Kibbutz Ashdot Yaakov in 1941, and at the Avni Institute in Tel Aviv in 1944 and from 1954–79. Among those who studied with him were Israeli sculptor Dani Karavan and Israeli abstract artist Lea Nikel, also the painter Yehuda Neiman.

He and Avigdor Stematsky formed the Studia Art School in 1944. In 1964, he and Yechiel Shemi and other artists formed a group of artists called Tatzpit (Vantage Point).

He participated in 24th Venice Biennale (1948), the 28th Venice Biennale (1954), the 3rd São Paulo Art Biennial (1955), and the 33rd Venice Biennale (1966). He was President of the Israeli Artists and Painters Union.

== Style ==
His painting style involved using successive thick layers of paint. He was an acclaimed painter in what was known as the modernist "New Horizons" (Ofakim Hadashim) group in 1950s Tel Aviv, which he founded in 1948 along with Joseph Zaritsky and Stematsky. It painted in a French "lyrical abstraction" style.

== Awards and recognition ==
Streichman won the Dizengoff Prize multiple times (1941, 1944, 1954, 1969), the Ramat Gan Prize (1956), the Moadon Milo Prize (1968), the Sandberg Prize for Israeli Art, awarded by the Israel Museum (1974), the Histadrut Prize (1986), the Israel Prize (1990). In 1948 he participated in 24th Venice Biennale. During the years 1941–44 he was a member of Kibbutz Ashdot Ya'akov. During 1945–48 he founded The Studio in Tel Aviv with Stematsky. In 1948 Streichman was one of the founders of New Horizon Group. In 1981 he was made an Honorary citizen of Tel Aviv and in 1992 Honorary President of the Association of Artists and sculptors.

He died on January 12, 1993, in Tel Aviv, at the age of 86.

A street in the Nofei Yam neighborhood of Tel Aviv is named after him in acknowledgment of his contributions to the arts.

== Solo exhibitions ==
- 1945 Tel Aviv Museum, Tel Aviv
- 1953 Tel Aviv Museum, Tel Aviv
- 1960 Tel Aviv Museum, The Helena Rubinstein Pavilion
- 1961 Israel Gallery, Tel Aviv
- 1967 Beit Yad Labanim Museum, Petach Tikva
- 1969 M. Riebenfeld Gallery, Tel Aviv
- 1974 Israel Museum, Jerusalem
- 1974 Yodfat Gallery, Tel Aviv
- 1975 Tel Aviv Museum, Tel Aviv
- 1975 Beit Uri and Rami Museum, Ashdot Yaacov
- 1977 Mishkan Le'omanut, Holon
- 1977 Berta Udang Gallery, Jerusalem
- 1979 M. Riebenfeld Gallery, Tel Aviv
- 1980 Haifa Museum of Modern Art, Haifa
- 1980 Museum of Art, Ein Harod
- 1980 Hillel Gallery, Jerusalem
- 1981 Neomi Givon Gallery, Tel Aviv
- 1985 Mishkenot Sha'ananim, Jerusalem
- 1986 The Knesset, Jerusalem
- 1987 Israel Museum, Jerusalem
- 1987 Givon Gallery, Tel Aviv
- 1989 Tel Aviv Museum of Art, Tel Aviv
- 1989 Hecht Museum, Haifa
- 1990 Beersheba Museum of Israeli Art, Beersheba
- 1991 Tefen Open Museum, Tefen
- 1998 Aharon Kahana House, Ramat Gan

== Published works ==
- Yehezkel Streichman: paintings: 1942–1975, Muze'on Tel Aviv (1975)
- Yehezkel Streichman: paintings: March–April 1974, Volume 117 of The Israel Museum, Jerusalem, Yona Fischer (1981)
- Yehezkel Streichman: watercolours: Tel Aviv, Museum of Art, Yehezkel Streichman, Museum of Art (1989)
- Yehezkel Streichman: recent work: the Open Museum, Industrial Park, Tefen, winter 1991, Yehezkiel Streichman, Nathan Zach, Richard Flantz, Avraham Hai, Muzeon ha-patuah (Migdal Tefen), Open Museum – Tefen Industrial Park (1991)
- Streichman, Yona Fischer, Yehezkel Streichman, Israel Phoenix and Yehezkel Streichman Estate (1997)

== See also ==
- List of Israel Prize recipients
- Israeli art
- Avigdor Stematsky
- Aharon Avni
- Yitzhak Frenkel
- Histadrut Art Studio
