= Michael Gross (artist) =

Israeli painter, sculptor and conceptual artist (1920–2004)

Michael Gross מיכאל גרוס
- Born: 1920; Tiberias, Mandatory Palestine
- Died: 2004 (aged 83–84)
- Known for: painter, sculptor
- Movement: Israeli art

Michael Gross (Hebrew: מיכאל גרוס; 1920 – 4 November 2004) was an Israeli painter, sculptor and conceptual artist.

== Biography ==
Michael Gross was born in Tiberias in the Mandatory Palestine in 1920. He grew up in the farming village of Migdal. In 1939–1940, he left to study at the Teachers’ Training College in Jerusalem. In 1939, while he was away, his father was murdered by Arabs, and the family farm and home were destroyed. This event impacted on his work as an artist.

From 1943 to 1945, he studied architecture at Technion – Israel Institute of Technology in Haifa. From 1951 to 1954, he studied art at the École nationale supérieure des Beaux-Arts in Paris. He returned to Israel in 1954 and settled in the artists’ village of Ein Hod.

== Artistic style ==
Gross's works are imbued with the light and spirit. They are minimalist, but never pure abstraction, always tied to natural form and laden with feeling. In his early paintings, Gross simplified form in order to concentrate on proportion, broad areas of color, and the size and placement of each element. This reductive process was also notable in his sculptures, whether in painted iron or other materials such as white concrete. In later paintings, he often juxtaposed large off-white panels with patches of tone, adding textured materials such as wooden beams, burlap and rope. Gross's rough, freely-brushed surfaces, along with the use of soft pastel coloring, conjure up images of the Israeli landscape.

== Gallery ==
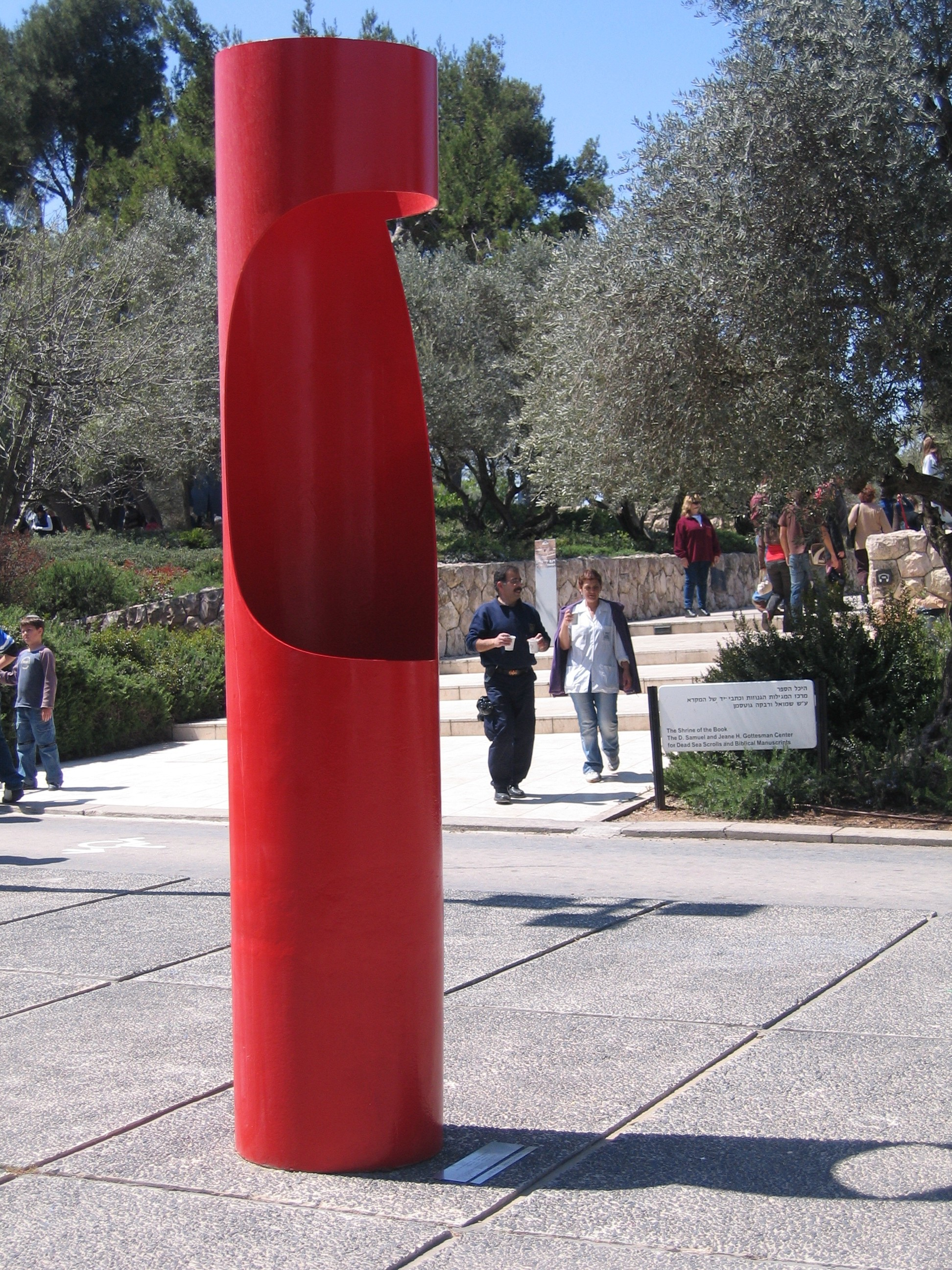
"Queen" (1969-1970), Painted iron, Israel Museum, Jerusalem

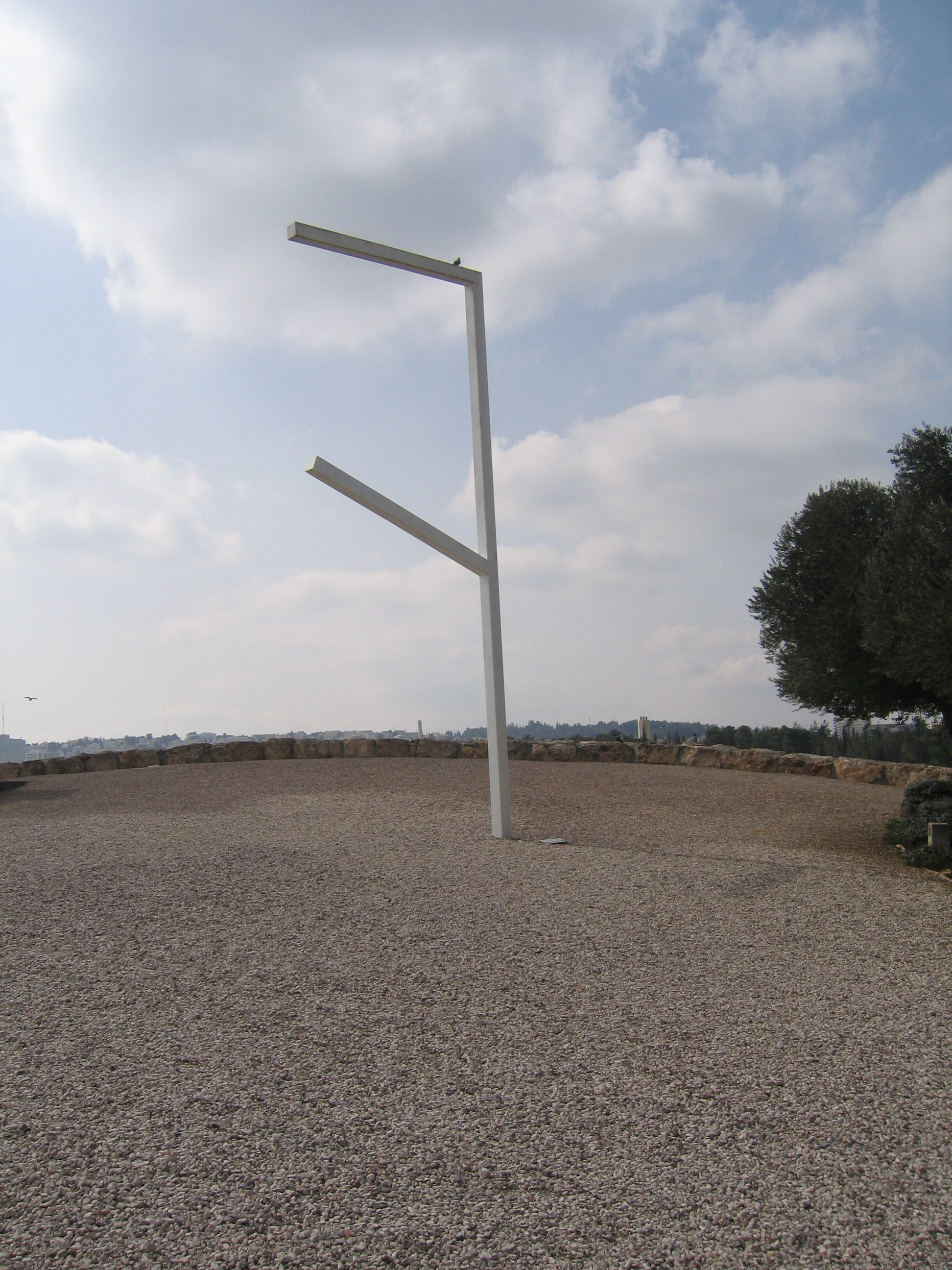
Cry, Pray, 1992
painted iron
Israel Museum Collection
B92.1547

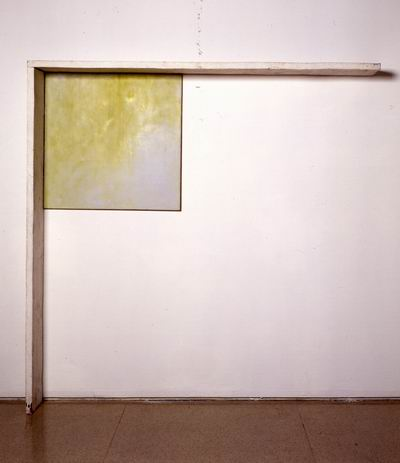
First Chapter of Wall Work, 1977
Israel Museum Collection
B94.0762

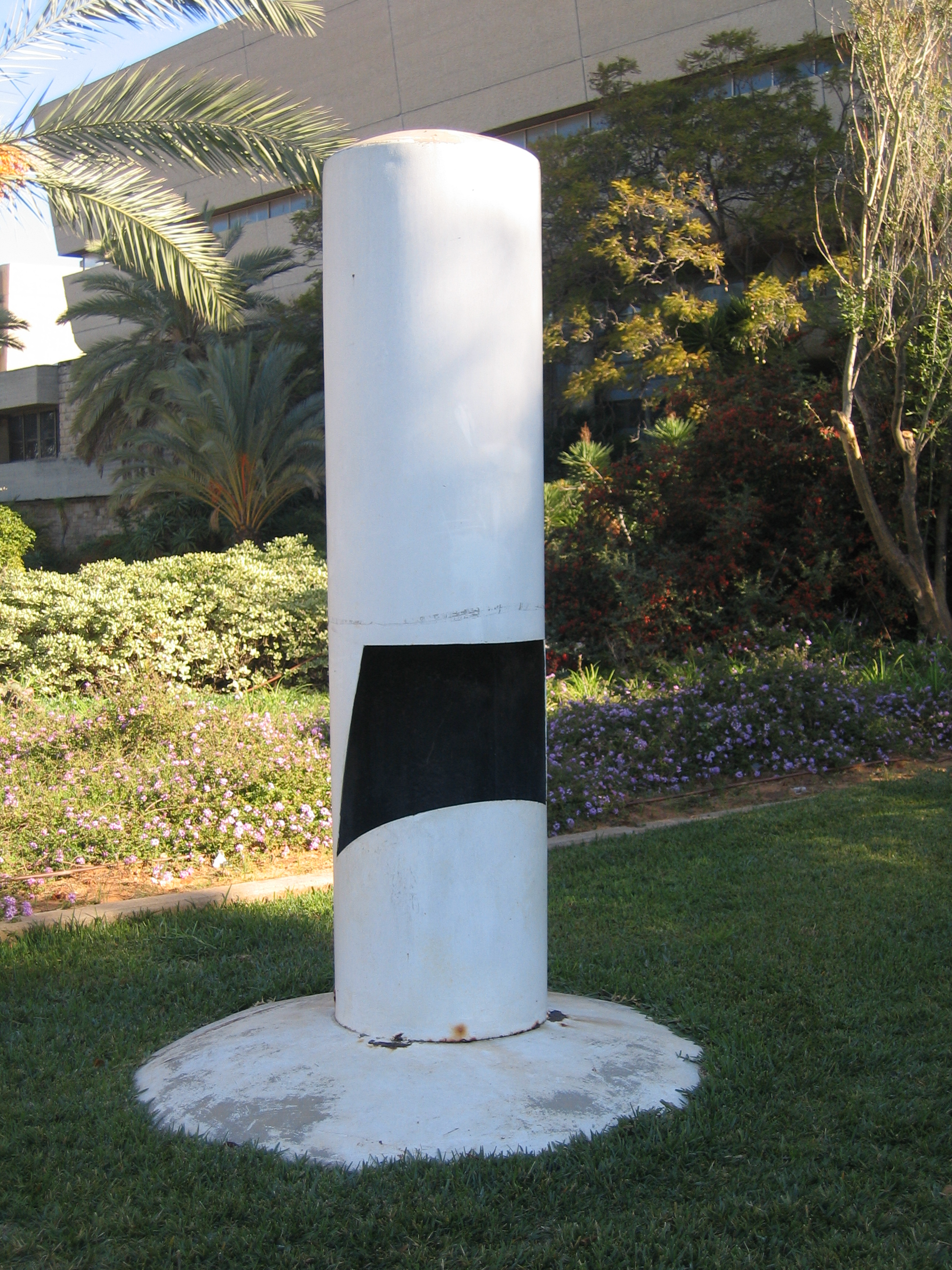
"To the victims of the sea" (1969), painted iron, Tel Aviv University

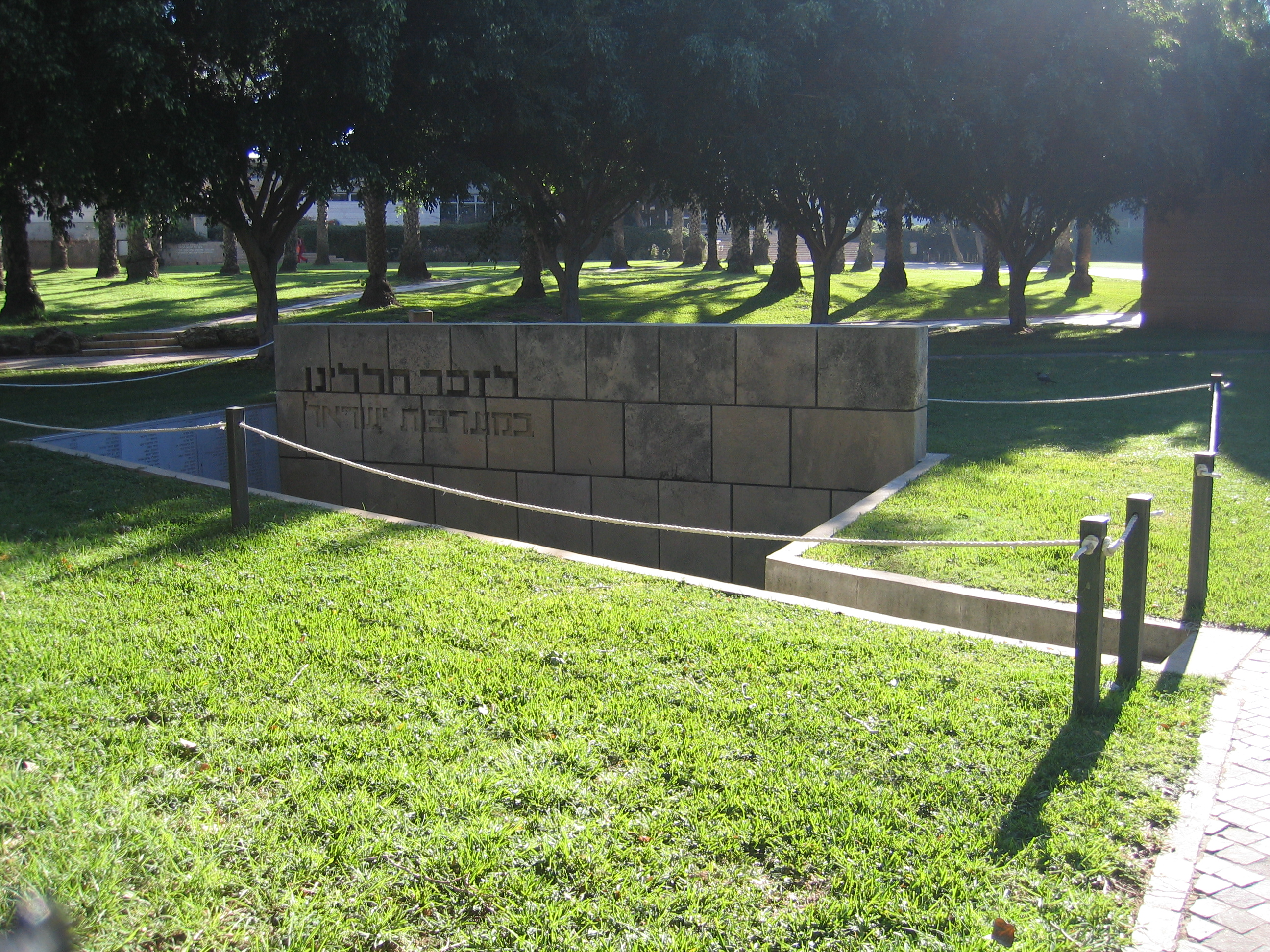
Monument, Tel Aviv University

== Education ==
- 1936-1940 Teachers Seminary, Jerusalem
- 1943–1945, Technion, Haifa, architecture, studied sculpture with Moshe Ziffer.
- 1951-1954 Beaux Arts, Paris with Michel Gimond

== Teaching ==
- 1954 - 1954 Higher School of Education, Haifa.
- 1957-1960 Bezalel Academy of Arts and Design, Jerusalem
- 1960-1980 Oranim Art Institute, Tivon

== Awards ==
- 1964: Herman Struck Prize
- 1967: Dizengoff Prize
- 1971: Gold Medal, São Paulo Art Biennial
- 1977: Sandberg Prize for an Israeli Artist, Israel Museum
- 1987: Minister of Education and Culture Prize for Painting and Sculpture
- 1995 Gamzu Prize, Tel Aviv Museum
- 2000: Israel Prize for painting and sculpture.

== Outdoor and public art ==
- 1974, Kiryat Hayovel (Simon Bolivar Park), Jerusalem
- 1980, Kibbutz Messilot
- 1982 To the victims of the sea, 1969, Tel Aviv University
- 1985 Tel Aviv University
- 1996 "Trio"- square of Tel Aviv Museum of Art

== See also ==
- List of Israel Prize recipients
- Visual arts in Israel
