= Avigdor Stematsky =

Israeli painter (1908–1989)

Avigdor Stematsky אביגדור סטמצקי
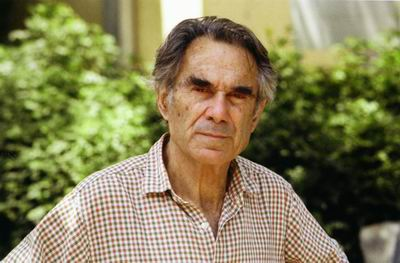
- Stematsky in 1977
- Born: 1908; Odessa, Russian Empire (now Odesa, Ukraine)
- Died: 1989 (aged 80–81)
- Citizenship: Israel
- Education: Bezalel Academy of Art and Design; Histadrut Art Studio; Académie de la Grande Chaumière; Académie Colarossi
- Known for: Painting
- Movement: Israeli art

Avigdor Stematsky (Hebrew: אביגדור סטמצקי; 1908–1989) was a Russian-born Israeli painter. He is considered one of the pioneers of Israeli abstract art.

== Biography ==
Stematsky was born in 1908 in Odessa, Russian Empire (now Odesa, Ukraine). He studied under Isaac Frenkel Frenel in the Histadrut Art Studio. He joined the Massad group in Tel Aviv. Following the advice of Frenkel, he was among those students of Frenkel who left for Paris to further their studies. He did so in 1929, when he went to study at the Académie de la Grande Chaumière and Académie Colarossi.

He was one of the founders of the New Horizons group. He held his first solo exhibition at the Tel Aviv Museum of Art at the age of 31. In the constellation of Israel art, Stematsky and Yehezkiel Streichman stand out as a pair. Although each developed his own distinct, individual style, there are many points of affinity between them: a common background as students of Bezalel in the 1920s, a response to the influences of the Jewish School of Paris in the 1930s, and of the "modern" (late cubist) art in the 1940s and fifties, when they were also leading teachers in Tel Aviv.

== Gallery ==
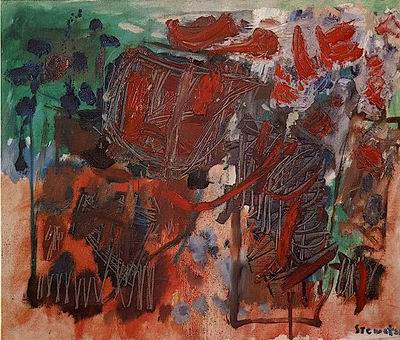
Etude, 1962
Israel Museum Collection
B95.0596

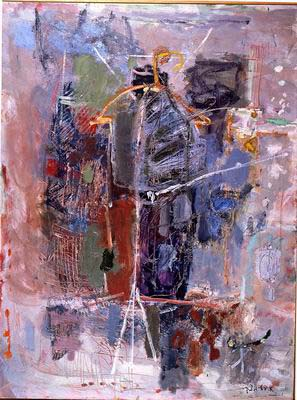
Painting, 1975-76
Israel Museum Collection
B78.0004

== Education ==
- 1925–26 – Herzliya Hebrew Gymnasium, Tel Aviv
- 1926–28 – Bezalel Academy of Arts and Design Jerusalem, with Arie Aroch, Moshe Castel and others
- 1928 – Technion, Haifa, Architecture
- 1929 – Yitzhak Frenkel Studio, Tel Aviv
- 1930–31 – Académie de la Grande Chaumière, Paris, with Aharon Avni

== Teaching ==
- 1954-58 Studio with Yehezkel Streichman which was active until 1948
- 1952–60 Avni Institute of Art and Design, Tel Aviv
- 1973, 1977 Haifa University and Avni Institute of Art and Design

== Awards and prizes ==
- 1941 The Dizengoff Prize for Painting and Sculpture, Municipality of Tel Aviv-Yafo, Tel Aviv
- 1956 The Dizengoff Prize for Painting and Sculpture, Municipality of Tel Aviv-Yafo, Tel Aviv
- 1958 Ramat Gan Prize
- 1965 Milo Club Prize
- 1967 First Prize Tower of David Exhibition, Jerusalem
- 1973 The Meir Sherman Prize, Israel Museum, Jerusalem
- 1976 Sandberg Prize for Israeli Art, Israel Museum, Jerusalem

== See also ==
- Culture of Israel
- Histadrut Art Studio
- Yitzhak Frenkel
- Ofakim Hadashim
