= List of Israeli visual artists =

The following is a list of Israeli artists working in visual or plastic media.

== A ==
- Abed Abdi
- Larry Abramson
- Matanya Abramson
- Yaacov Agam
- Mel Alexenberg
- Dan Allon
- Oz Almog
- Nir Alon
- Aharon April
- Amnon David Ar
- Boaz Arad
- Mordecai Ardon
- Einat Arif-Galanti
- Avigdor Arikha
- David Ascalon
- Maurice Ascalon
- Isidor Ascheim
- Oreet Ashery
- Maya Attoun
- Mordechai Avniel
- Nehemia Azaz

== B ==
- Samuel Bak
- Adina Bar-On
- Beverly Barkat
- Tuvia Beeri
- Edward Ben Avram
- Avner Ben-Gal
- Yosl Bergner
- Helen Berman
- Naftali Bezem
- Alexander Bogen

== C ==
- Rhea Carmi
- Zoya Cherkassky-Nnadi
- Pinchas Cohen-Gan
- Maya Cohen-Levy
- Keren Cytter

== D ==
- Yitzhak Danziger
- Ya'acov Dorchin

== E ==
- Bracha L. Ettinger

== F ==
- Belu-Simion Fainaru
- Dov Feigin
- Yitzhak Frenkel (known also as Alexandre Frenel)

== G ==
- Sasha Galitsky
- Pinchas Cohen Gan
- Ilan Garibi
- Gideon Gechtman
- Mordechai Geldman
- David Gerstein
- Michail Grobman
- Batia Grossbard
- Dor Guez
- Nachum Gutman

== H ==
- Shlomith Haber-Schaim
- Paul Hartal
- Emanuel Hatzofe
- Michal Heiman
- Itshak Holtz
- Shimshon Holzman

== I ==
- Eli Ilan

== J ==
- Marcel Janco

== K ==
- Menashe Kadishman
- Leo Kahn
- Dani Karavan
- Shemuel Katz
- Zivia Kay
- Joseph Kossonogi
- Elyasaf Kowner
- Heddy Kun

== L ==
- Jeremy Langford
- Raffi Lavie
- Dorit Levinstein
- Maya Cohen Levy
- Pamela Levy
- Emmanuil Lipkind

== M ==
- Zvi Malnovitzer
- Emmanuel Mané-Katz
- David Mezach
- Leonid Mezheritski
- Grégoire Michonze
- Nachume Miller
- Motti Mizrachi

== N ==
- Shlomo Narinsky
- Adi Nes
- Joshua Neustein
- Lea Nikel

== O ==
- Avraham Ofek
- Aliza Olmert
- Ezra Orion
- Chana Orloff
- Batya Ouziel

== P ==
- Abel Pann
- Felice Pazner Malkin
- Raphael Perez
- Sam Philipe
- Meir Pichhadze
- Jacob Pins

== R ==
- Ze'ev Raban
- Ilana Raviv
- Nissan Rilov
- Hillel Roman
- Leo Roth
- Michal Rovner
- Joram Rozov
- Reuven Rubin
- Zahara Rubin

== S ==
- Ella Sadovsky
- Moshe Safdie
- Naomi Safran-Hon
- Mandy Sand (born Mandy Sandulovici}
- Zahara Schatz
- Buky Schwartz
- Shelomo Selinger
- Ilana Shafir
- Hagit Shahal
- Gabriel and Maxim Shamir
- Shaul Shats
- Avner Sher
- Ahuva Sherman
- Siona Shimshi
- Merav Shinn Ben-Alon
- Shlomo Shriki
- Noemi Smilansky
- Sari Srulovitch
- Jacob Steinhardt
- Zamy Steynovitz
- Maayan Strauss
- Yehezkel Streichman
- Abir Sultan
- Sucho (Gedalia Suchowolski)

== T ==
- Roni Taharlev
- Tal R
- Ruben Talberg
- Itzchak Tarkay
- David Tartakover
- Paul Harrison Taylor
- Anna Ticho
- Igael (or Yigal) Tumarkin

== W ==
- Shraga Weil

== Y ==
- Yuval Yairi
- Abraham Yakin
- Hannah Yakin
- Yitzhak Yamin
- Daniela Yaniv-Richter
- Josephine Yaroshevich
- Yoop de Yons (or Joop de Jong)
- Addam Yekutieli

== Z ==
- Idan Zareski
- Moshe Ziffer
- Julia Zisman

== See also ==
- List of Israeli women artists
