= List of Israeli artists =

List of Israeli artists may refer to:

- List of Israeli musical artists
- List of Israeli visual artists
