= Julia Zisman =

Russian-Israeli painter (born 1961)

Morning Tea, 2007

Julia Zisman (Hebrew: יוליה זיסמן, Russian: Юлия Зисман; born 1961) is a Russian-born Israeli painter.

== Biography ==
Julia Zisman was born in Chelyabinsk. She has a disability and uses a wheelchair. Zisman graduated from the department of Easel Painting the Russian Academy of Arts in Moscow. In 1991, she immigrated to Israel and settled in Haifa. Since then she has been a member of the Israeli Painters and Sculptors Association. Her works are in private collections in the US, Italy, France, Germany, Russia and Israel.

== Artistic style ==
Zisman paints in a figurative and narrative style using "similes that expose her personal codes like in a private diary." She says her painting sets her free, allowing her to "wander like the wind and fly like a spirit."
