= Sucho =

Artist

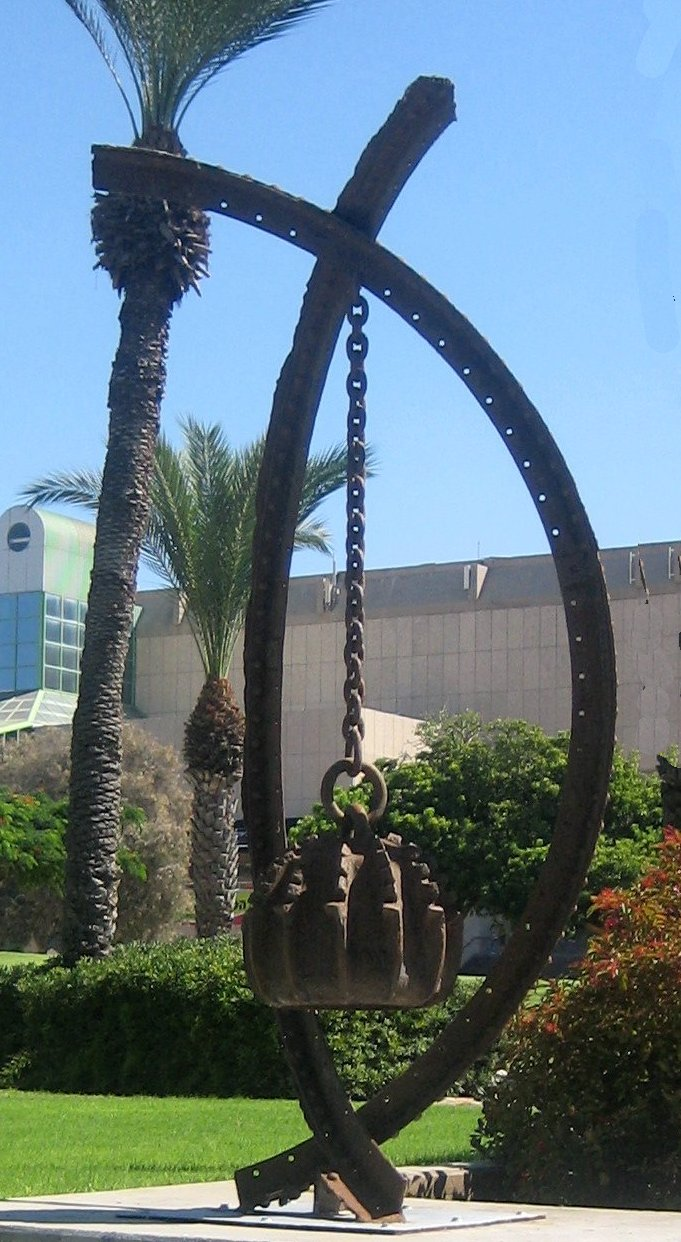
Untitled, 1971, Tel Aviv University, Tel Aviv, Israel

Gedalia Suchowolski (Hebrew: גדליה סוחובולסקי; 1928 – 2 August 2019) was a Polish-born Israeli painter and sculptor known by his nickname Sucho (Hebrew: סוחו).

Gedalia (Sucho) Suchowolski was born in Białystok, Poland. He immigrated to Mandate Palestine in 1941 and studied construction engineering at Technion – Israel Institute of Technology in Haifa, Israel. Sucho died on 2 August 2019, at the age of 91.

== Outdoor sculpture ==
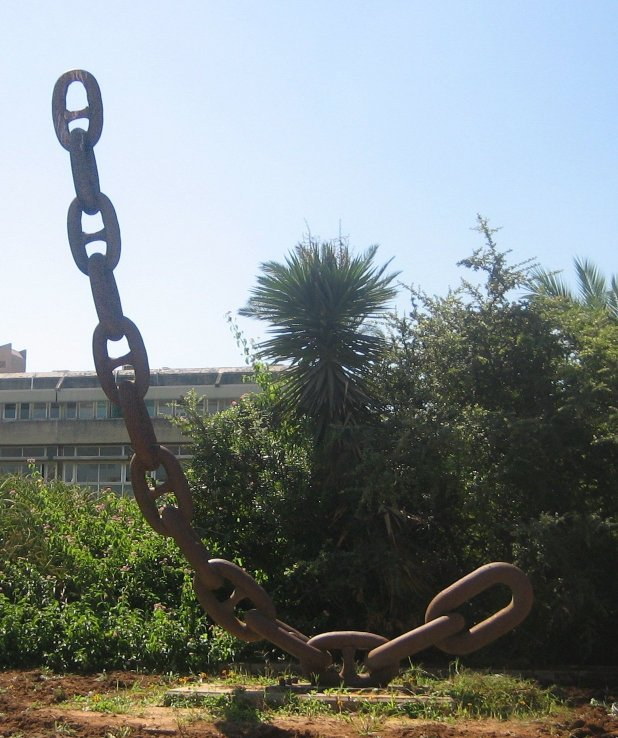
Untitled sculpture, 1970, Tel Aviv University, Tel Aviv, Israel

- Untitled 1970 sculpture, Tel Aviv University
- Untitled 1971 sculpture, Tel Aviv University
- 1976 play sculpture, Water Reservoir, Givat Shapira
- 1982 mobile sculpture, Yemin Moshe, Jerusalem
- Jerusalem, 1976, French Hill, Jerusalem

== Sources ==
- The Israel Museum
