= Yuval Yairi =

Israeli artist

Yuval Yairi (Hebrew: יובל יאירי; born 1961 in Tel-Aviv, Israel) is an Israeli artist, using photography, drawing and video. Yairi Studied visual communication at the WIZO College Haifa (1984-1988), was the director of a design studio in Jerusalem (1988-1999), produced and directed short films and documentaries until 2004. Since 2004 Yairi devotes his work to research and artistic activity, primarily in mediums of photography, drawing and video. The subjects of Yairi's work relate to Places, and his gaze - whether it's a historical place, cultural, personal or political - explores these places in context of memory. A Leper Hospital or a writer's library, an abandoned Arab village, a cheap hotel-room or a museum undergoing renovations - transform through his personal perspective, of deconstructing and recomposing spaces, times and events. Yairi's works are exhibited in museums, galleries and festivals in Israel and abroad, and are in public and private collections.

Yairi is a recipient of The Ministry of Culture Award for Visual Arts, 2017

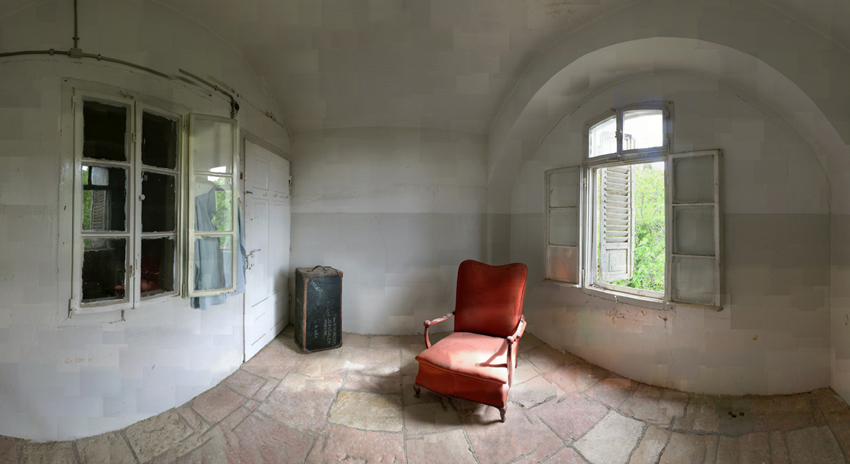

Yuval Yairi's series "Forevemore" has been exhibited at the Tel Aviv Museum of Art and Andrea Meislin Gallery in NYC in 2005.

Yairi photographs the leper house with a digital video camera in still mode, constructing the image from hundreds (at times thousands) of frames. The pictures are taken in the course of several hours, during which the artist slowly and accurately documents every detail in the space from a single position, like the viewer's observation movement upon entering the space. He selects details which he then combines into a final unified photographic image containing a wealth of information, one that no single still photograph can contain. Thus, in fact, Yairi overcomes the temporal and spatial limitations of conventional photography. _{from exhibition text, Tel Aviv Museum.}

Yuval Yairi's "Palaces of Memory" series has been exhibited at Alon Segev Gallery in 2007, and in New York at Andrea Meislin Gallery, 2008.

The Cage and the Bird "A cage went in search of a bird" wrote Kafka Kafka : a photographic structure went out into the world in search of motifs that would suit it. The result is the heart of this exhibition. The world can be perceived as "at once," as one, absolute, indivisible thing. But it can also be thought of as the sum of an infinite numbers of parts. So it is with everything, small or large: the world exists both as "one" (the absolute) and as a cumulation of an infinity of units. It is this duality that Yuval Yairi's photographs attempt to capture. They are almost all, at one and the same time, a collection of fractions, and a whole. They represent these two states of being - like water attempting to be vapor and ice at one and the same time. The "thickening of time" results from the image of the "art of memory," from which Yairi sets out to make his recent series of photographs, following in the path of Simonides of Ceos (556-468 B.C.E), the Greek poet considered to be the father of mnemonics (the art of aiding memory). Simonides' method of remembering is based on the "translation" of abstract concepts into concrete objects and their imaginary placement in a space well known to the memorizer, based on the assumption that concrete images are easier to remember than abstract ideas. Thus, for example, a poem can be translated into a series of mnemonic images that can be installed in the home of the memorizer. The act of remembering involves a stroll through the house, and the gathering of visual "reminders" along a known path. _{Dror Burstein}

Yuval Yairi is represented by Fabienne Levy Gallery in Lausanne, Switzerland

== Solo exhibitions ==
- 2023 CloudMapping, Fabienne Levy Gallery, Lausanne, CH
- 2019 Cyphers & Cypresses, Fabienne Levy Gallery, Lausanne, CH
- 2016 Surveyor, Epsten Gallery, Kansas City, USA
- 2016 Surveyor, Zemack Contemporary Art, Tel Aviv
- 2013 LAND, Zemack Contemporary Art, Tel-Aviv
- 2011 WORK (The Israel Museum's Renewal), Zemack Contemporary Art, Tel-Aviv
- 2008 Palaces of Memory, Andrea Meislin Gallery, NY
- 2007 Palaces of Memory, Alon Segev Gallery, Tel-Aviv
- 2005 Forevermore, Tel Aviv Museum of Art
- 2005 Forevermore, Andrea Meislin Gallery, New York

== Selected group exhibitions ==
- 2022 Observation Point, site specific installation, Jewish Culture Festival, Krakow
- 2020 Feminine Difference, (group), Haifa Museum of Art
- 2020 Up and Down the mountain, New Gallery, Jerusalem
- 2020 Winners exhibition. Ministry of culture awards, Ashdod Museum of Art
- 2018 Sambation, Jewish Culture Festival, Kraków
- 2017 Dangerous Art, Haifa Museum of Art
- 2017 Street View, Haifa Museum of Art
- 2016 Quest, Tel Hai Museum of Photography
- 2015 Sanctuary, Orlando Museum of Art
- 2013 Collecting Dust, Contemporary Israeli Art, The Israel Museum, Jerusalem
- 2011 Roundabout - Face to Face, Tel-Aviv Museum of Art
- 2011 Life: A user's Manual, The Israel Museum, Jerusalem
- 2010 Roundabout, City Gallery Wellington, New Zealand
- 2010 Looking in, Looking out: The window in art, The Israel Museum, Jerusalem
- 2008 Israel is Real, Contemporary photography from Israel, Epsten Gallery, Kansas
- 2008 @60.art.israel.world, Magnes Museum, Berkeley, California
- 2007 Moods and Modes in Israeli Photography, Tel Aviv Museum of Art
- 2007 Current Visions part 2, Andrea Meislin Gallery, NY
- 2006 Laterna Magica, Metaphysical Light in Israeli Photography, Bat-Yam Museum of Art
- 2004 "New Exposures" Recent acquisitions in Photography, The Israel Museum, Jerusalem

== Selected Festivals ==
- 2021 Festival Eclectic Campagne(s), The water chamber – le Favril
- 2018 We Are One World, Torrance Art Museum, Los Angeles
- 2017 Meetings, Video and Performance Festival, Denmark
- 2016 Cologne Off, Torrance Art Museum, Los Angeles
- 2016 Time is Love, Plateau gallery, Berlin
- 2015 Now & After Video art Festival Moscow – guests program
- 2015 Winter Stream (video art and short films), Epsten Gallery, Kansas City
- 2014 Video art and experimental film festival, Tribeca Cinemas, NY
- 2014 Festival of Migrant Films, Ljubljana, Slovenia
- 2014 FOKUS 2014 video art festival, Copenhagen
- 2014 AIVA, International video Art festival. Finspång, Sweden
