= Merav Shinn Ben-Alon =

Israeli artist (born 1965)

Merav Shinn Ben-Alon מירב שין בן-אלון
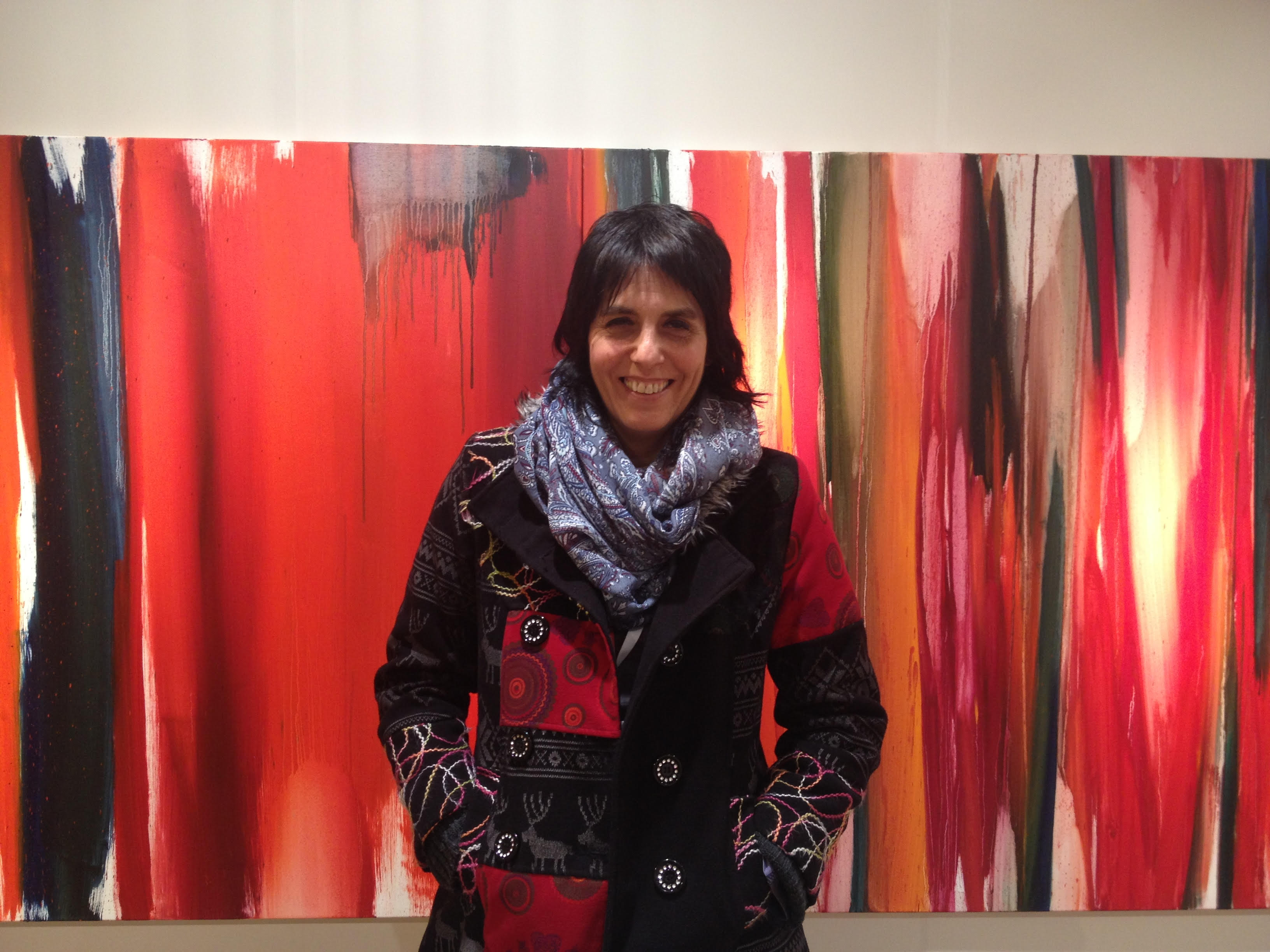
- Born: 1965 (age 60–61); Israel

Merav Shinn Ben-Alon (Hebrew: מירב שין בן-אלון; born 1965) is a multidisciplinary artist based in Tel Aviv. Her work has included work based on clothing.

== Biography ==
Merav Shinn Ben-Alon is a multidisciplinary artist based in Tel Aviv. She holds a master's degree with honors from the Interdisciplinary Program in the Arts, Tel Aviv University, studied at the New York Studio School, NYC and earned her bachelor's degree with honors from the Bezalel Academy of Arts and Design, Jerusalem. She was a two-time recipient of the 'Artistic Encouragement Award' from the Israeli Ministry of Culture, won the America–Israel Cultural Foundation Prize and received an excellence award twice during her graduate studies.

In 2001 she developed work based on T-shirts and uniforms called "Stitches".

Her works were presented, inter alia :Mark Rothko Art Centre (Daugavpils Latvia) Watari Museum of Contemporary Art (Tokyo) Museum of Art (Tel Aviv) Museum of Art (Haifa) Museum of Art (Petah –Tikva) The Israel Museum (Jerusalem) and at further art institutions such as Hakibbutz Art Gallery (Tel Aviv) and Zenit Gallery (Copenhagen)
