= Ilan Garibi =

Israeli origami artist and designer (born 1965)

- אילן גריבי
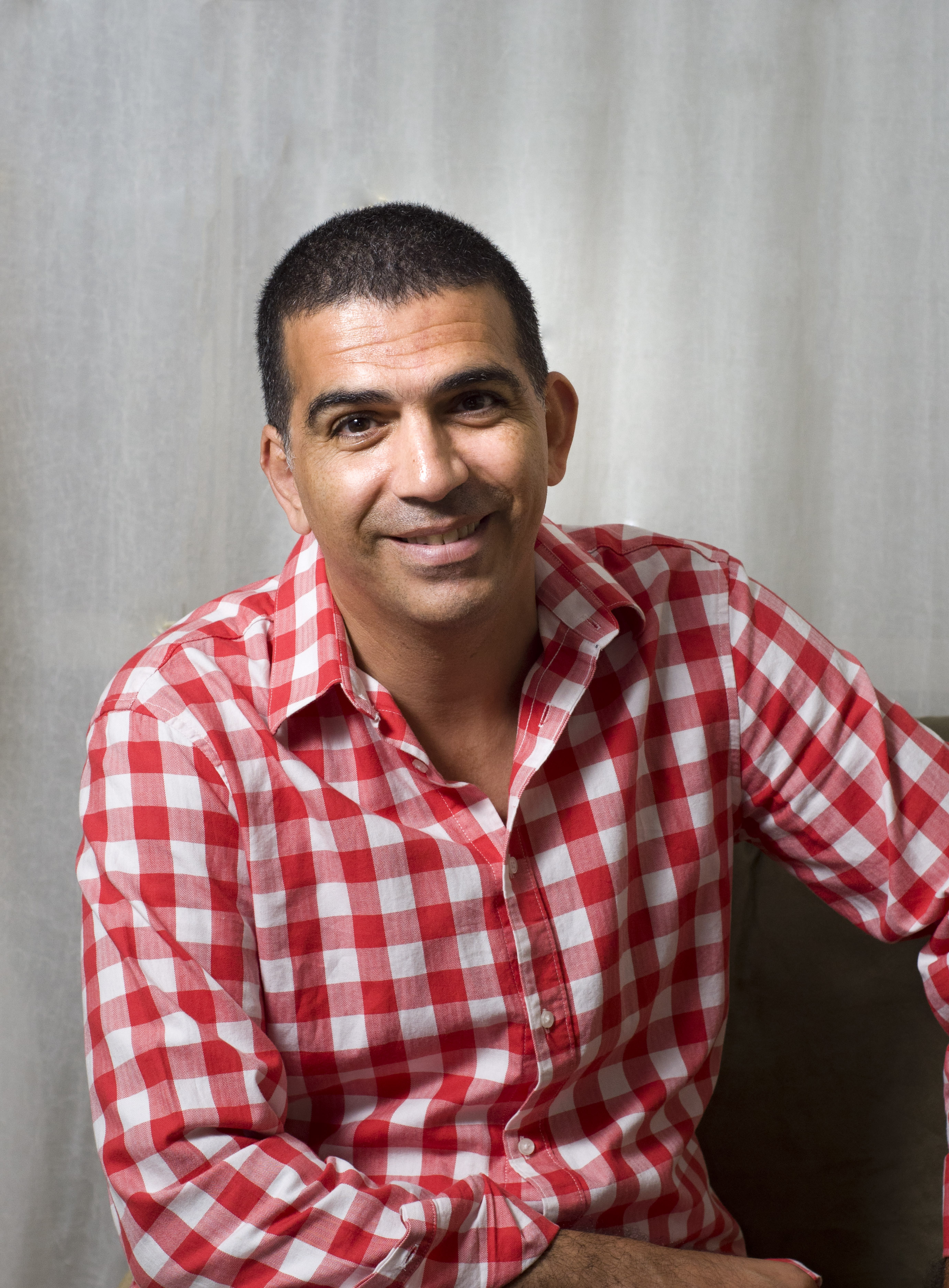
- Photo by Yoav Garibi
- Born: 1965 (age 60–61); Hadera
- Known for: origami, design
- Website: garibiorigami.com

Ilan Garibi (Hebrew: אילן גריבי; born 1965) is an Israeli origami artist and designer. He started his way in the world of art and design as a paper origami artist, and today also designs furniture, jewelry and works of art out of a variety of materials, such as metals, wood, and glass. He masters an origami genre called Tessellation. During 2012 he co-established Origamisrael, the Israeli origami artists' organization, and he is its chairman ever since. He is an author of several books in the fields of origami and puzzles. In September 2019, Garibi presented a TEDx talk as part of TEDxPaloAltoSalon.

== Personal life ==
Garibi was born and raised in Hadera, the second of five children to Shula and Salman Garibi. He is married to Sigal and father to three. In 1983 he joined the IDF and served as an intelligence officer until he retired in 2009 as a lieutenant colonel.

== Origami ==
Garibi is folding origami from a young age. During his sixth grade, he learned to fold from the book “Origami 1” by Robert Harbin, and later on from the other three books in the series. During 2006 he joined the Israeli Origami Center, where he managed the folders' club between 2009-2011. In 2008 he started to create original origami designs, which he published in Flickr and various international origami groups. In 2009, after retiring from the military, he started to teach Creative and Scientific Thinking Through Origami to gifted students in the 'Techno Da' school in Hadera. Since 2011 Garibi is an editor for The Fold, the online magazine of OrigamiUSA. He conducted and published a series of Paper Review articles, in which he analyzes different types of paper to find how suitable they are for origami. He also writes the Origami Designer Secrets column, in which he interviews young origami artists from all over the world about their creative process. Diagrams to dozens of Garibi's origami models have been published in many international origami magazines, such as the British Origami Society magazine, the Spanish group origami magazine Pajarita, the American magazine The Paper, The Dutch magazine Orison, and others. He was also invited to many origami conventions as special guest.

During 2012 Garibi established, together with Dr. Saadya Sternberg and Gadi Vishne, the Origami Artists of Israel organization (then OASIS), and since then acting as its chairman. In 2016 the organization changed its name to Origamisrael, and as of 2019 it includes 120 members, and hosts an annual international convention. In 2017 Garibi founded the Convention for Creators (CFC), a professional convention for origami artists. The first CFC was in Lyon, September 2017, and the 2nd in Zaragoza, February 2020.

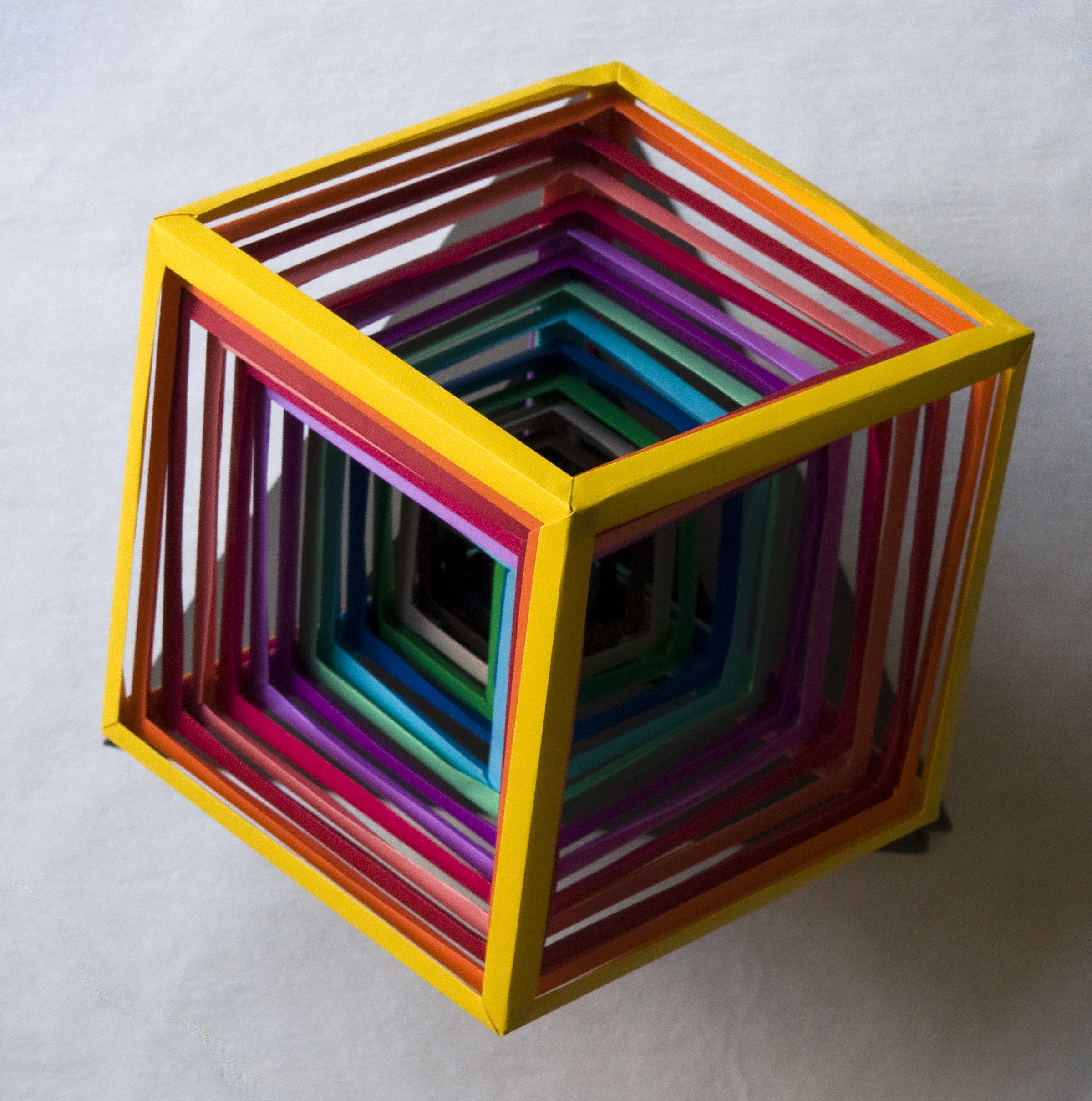
"Retractable Cube"

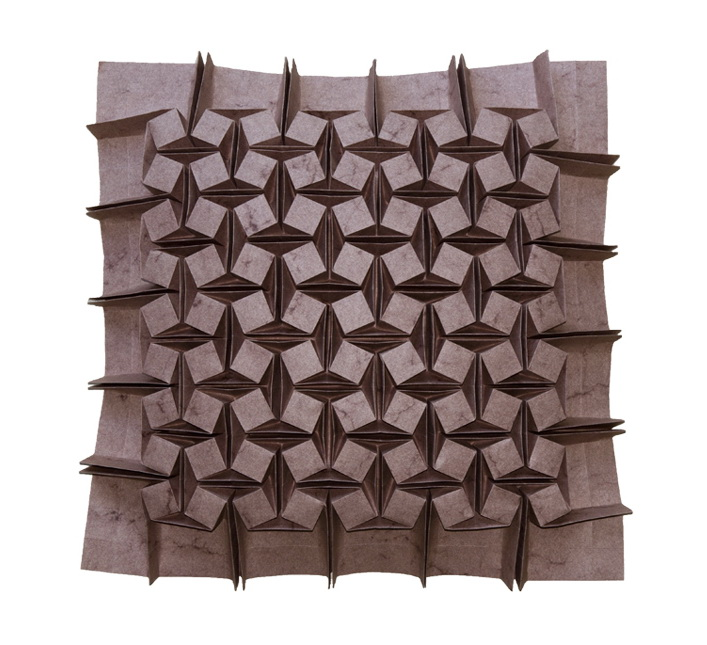
"Rotated Cubes"

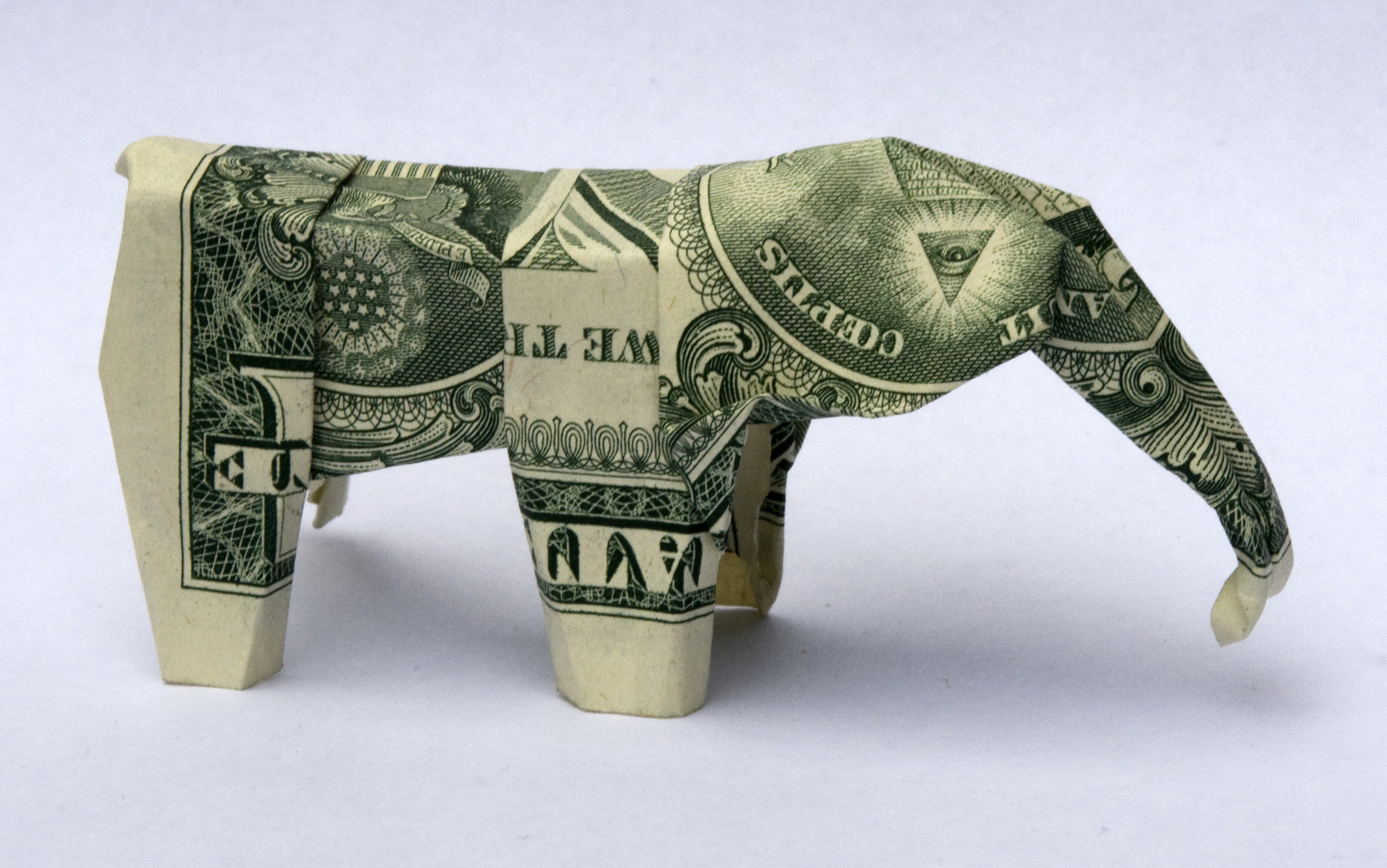
"No Elephant Hide"

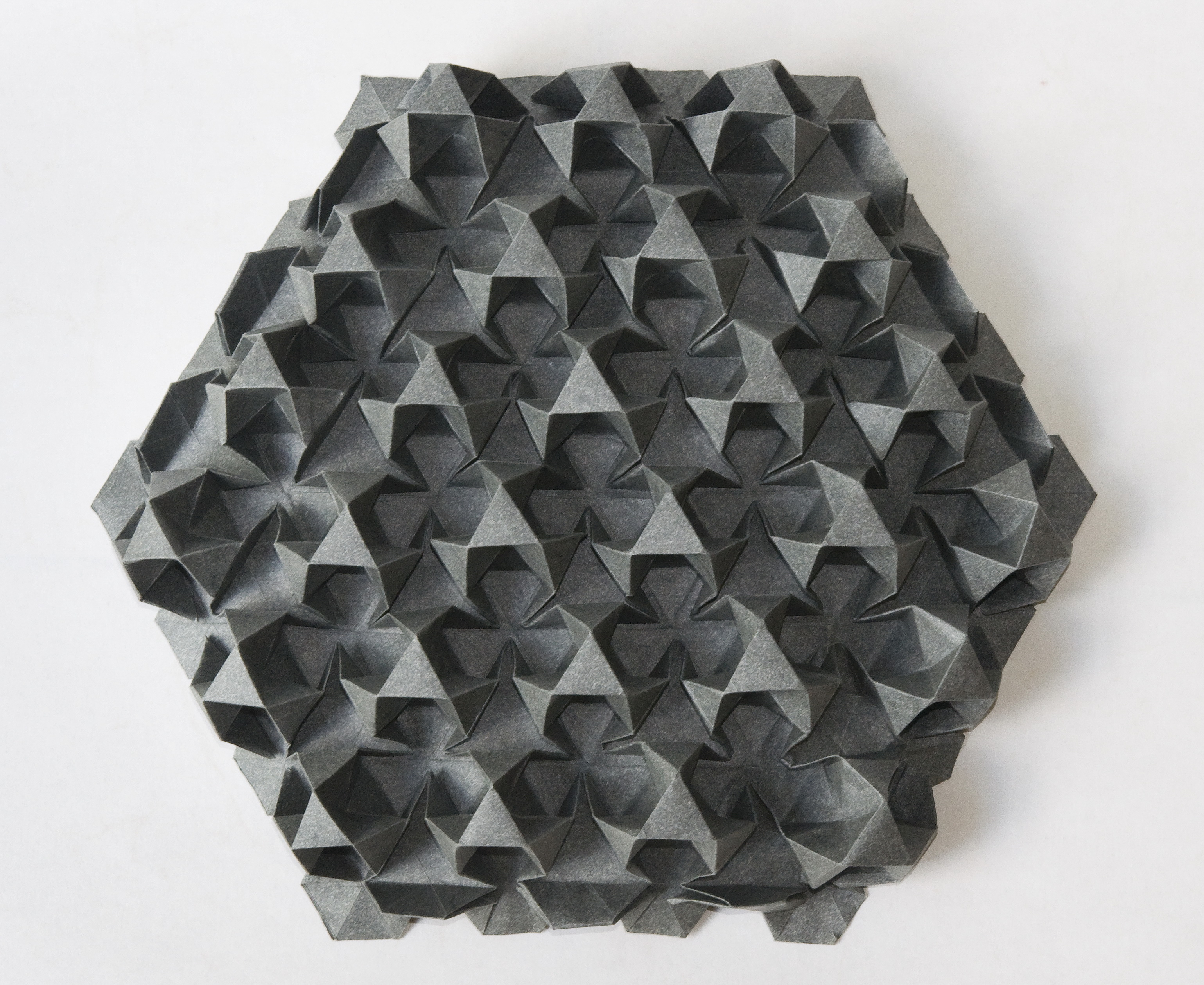
"Star of David"

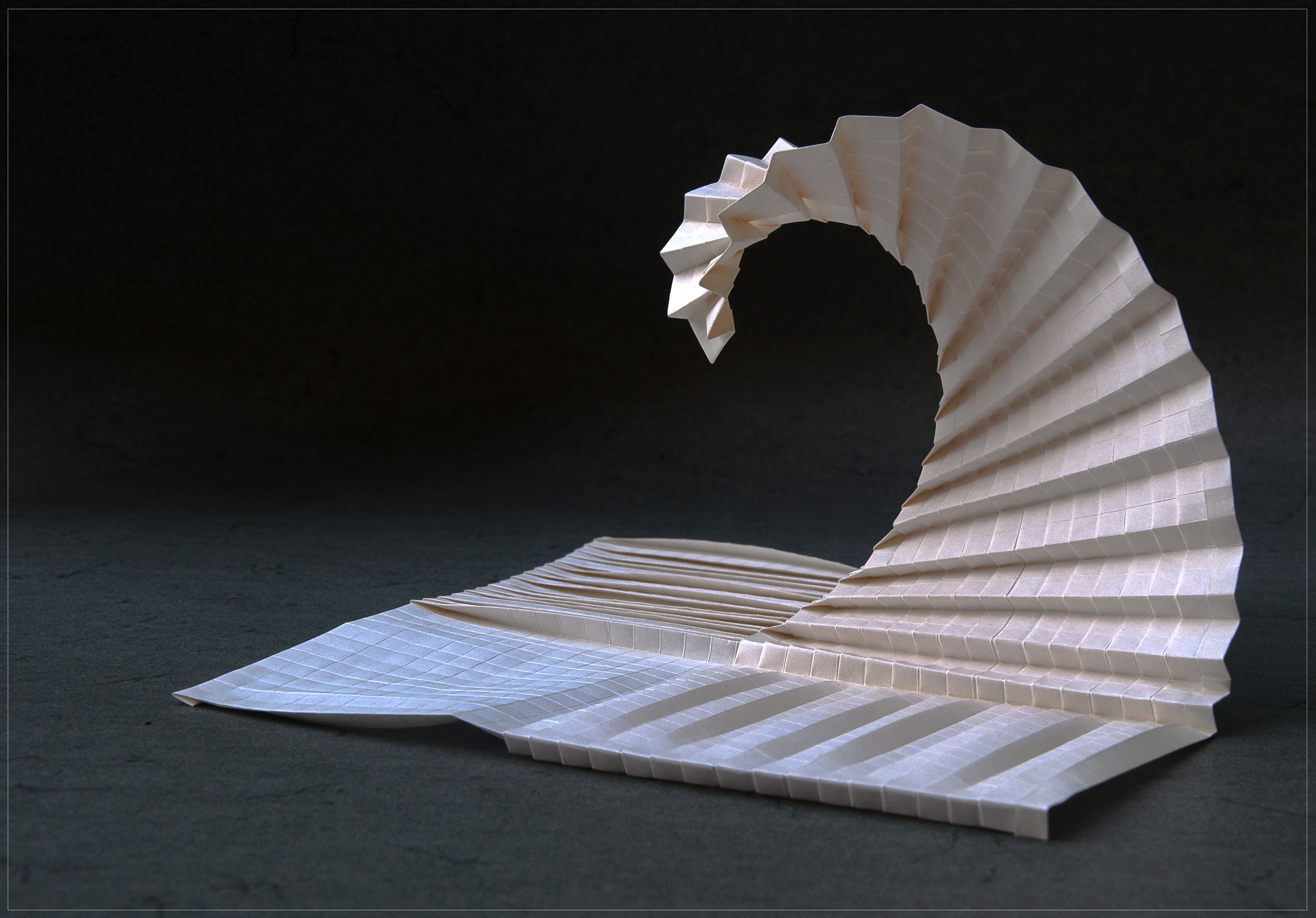
"Wave"

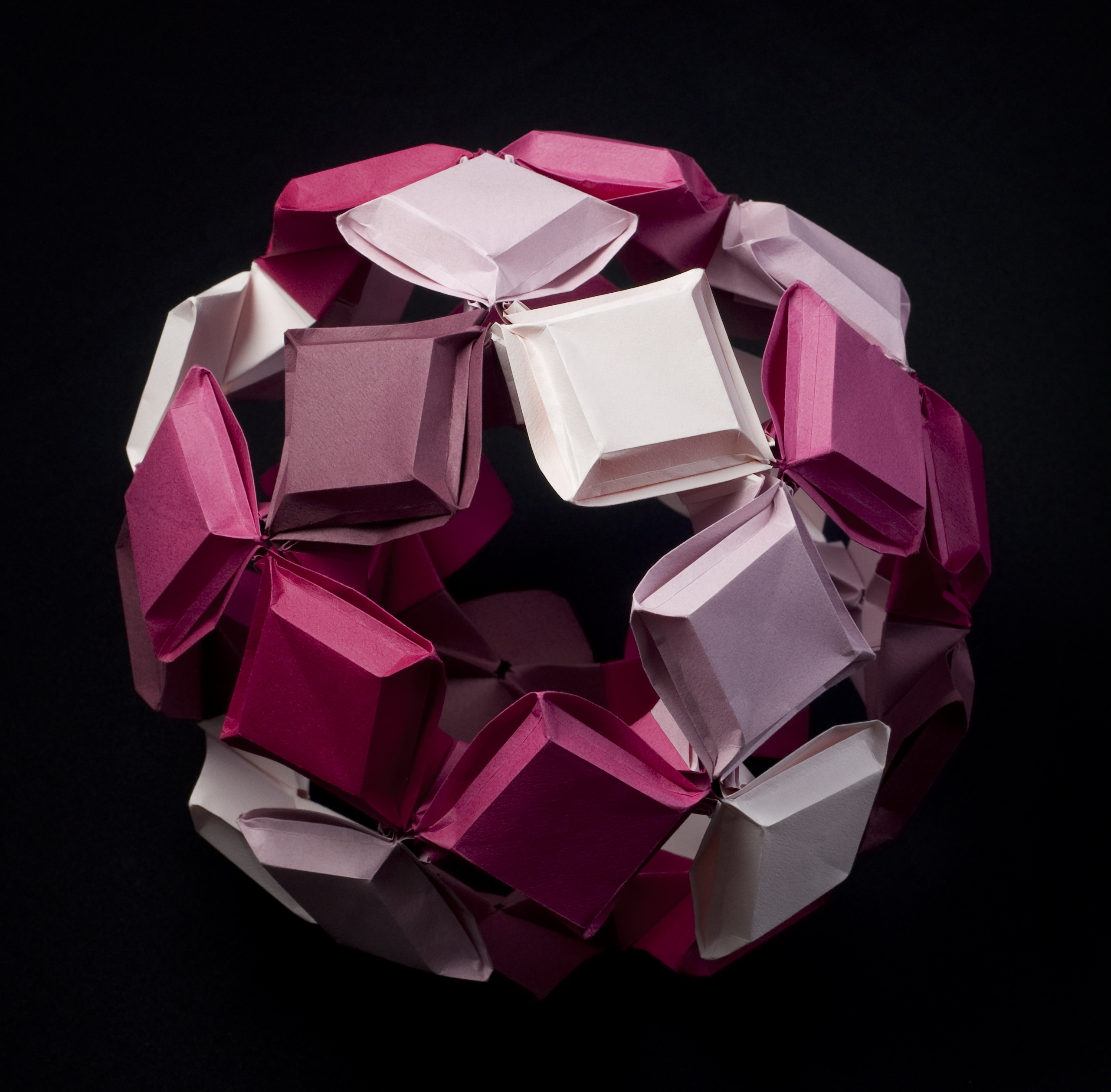
"Elegance"

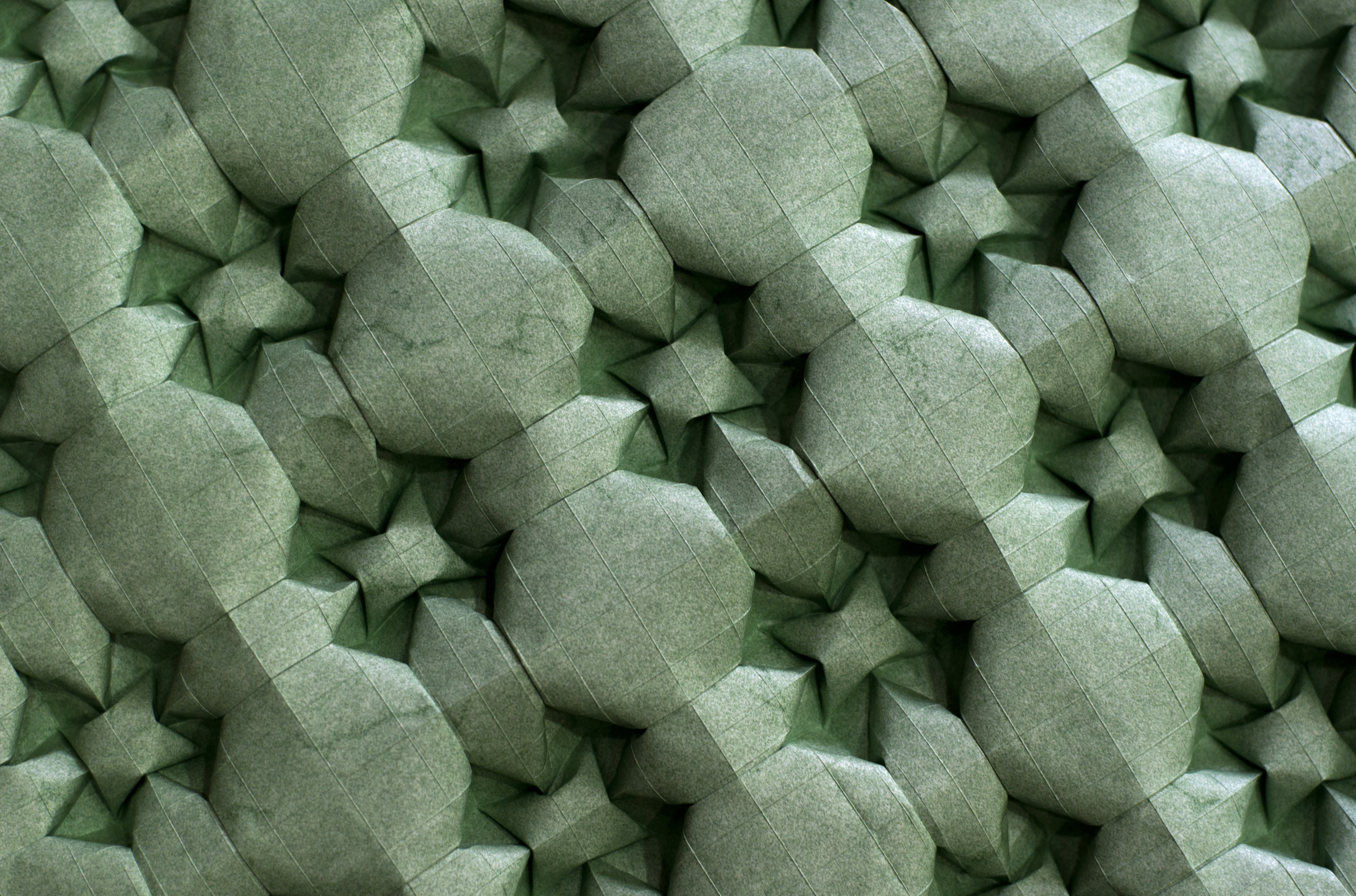
"Hidden Garden"

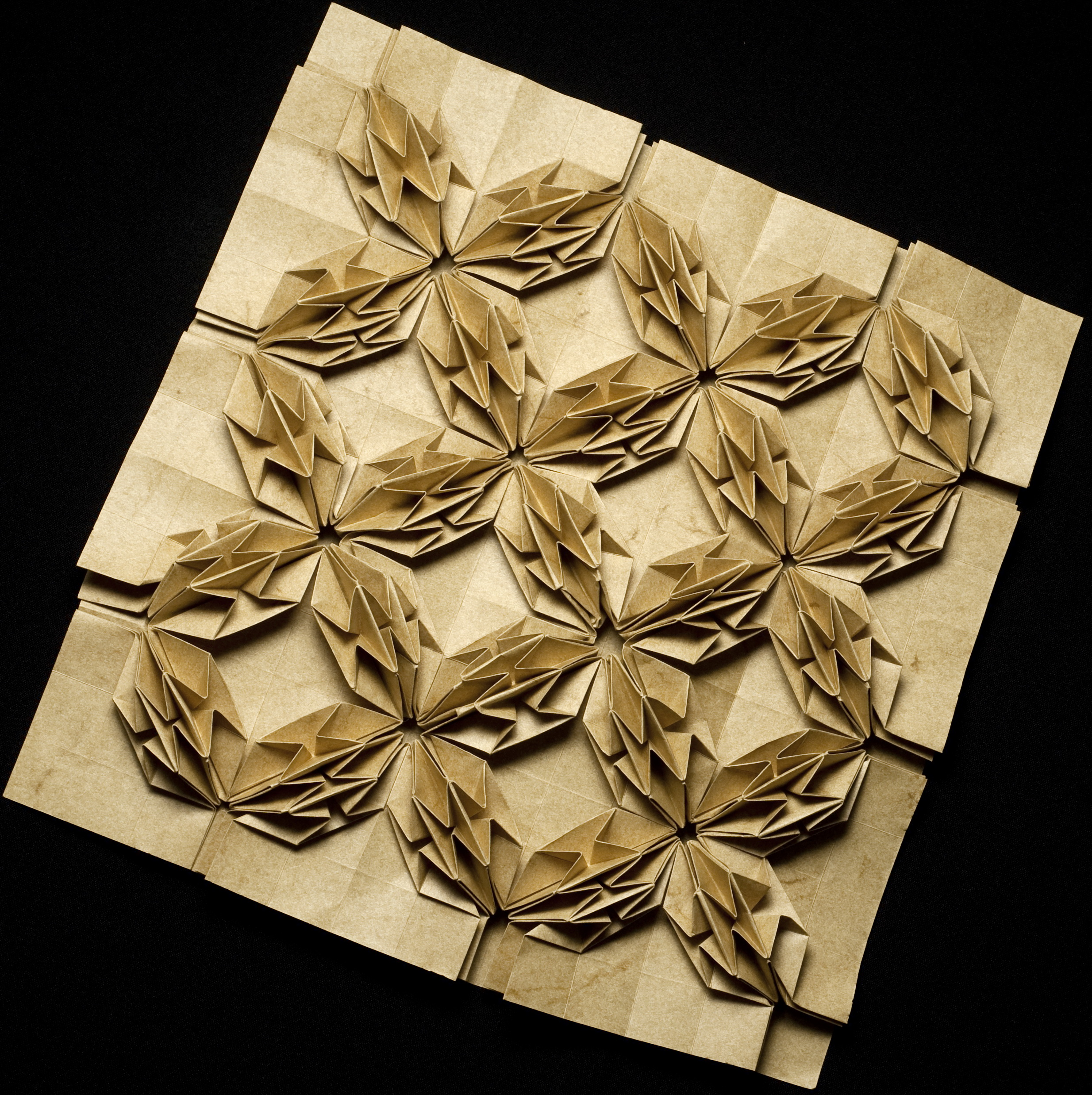
"Pineapple"

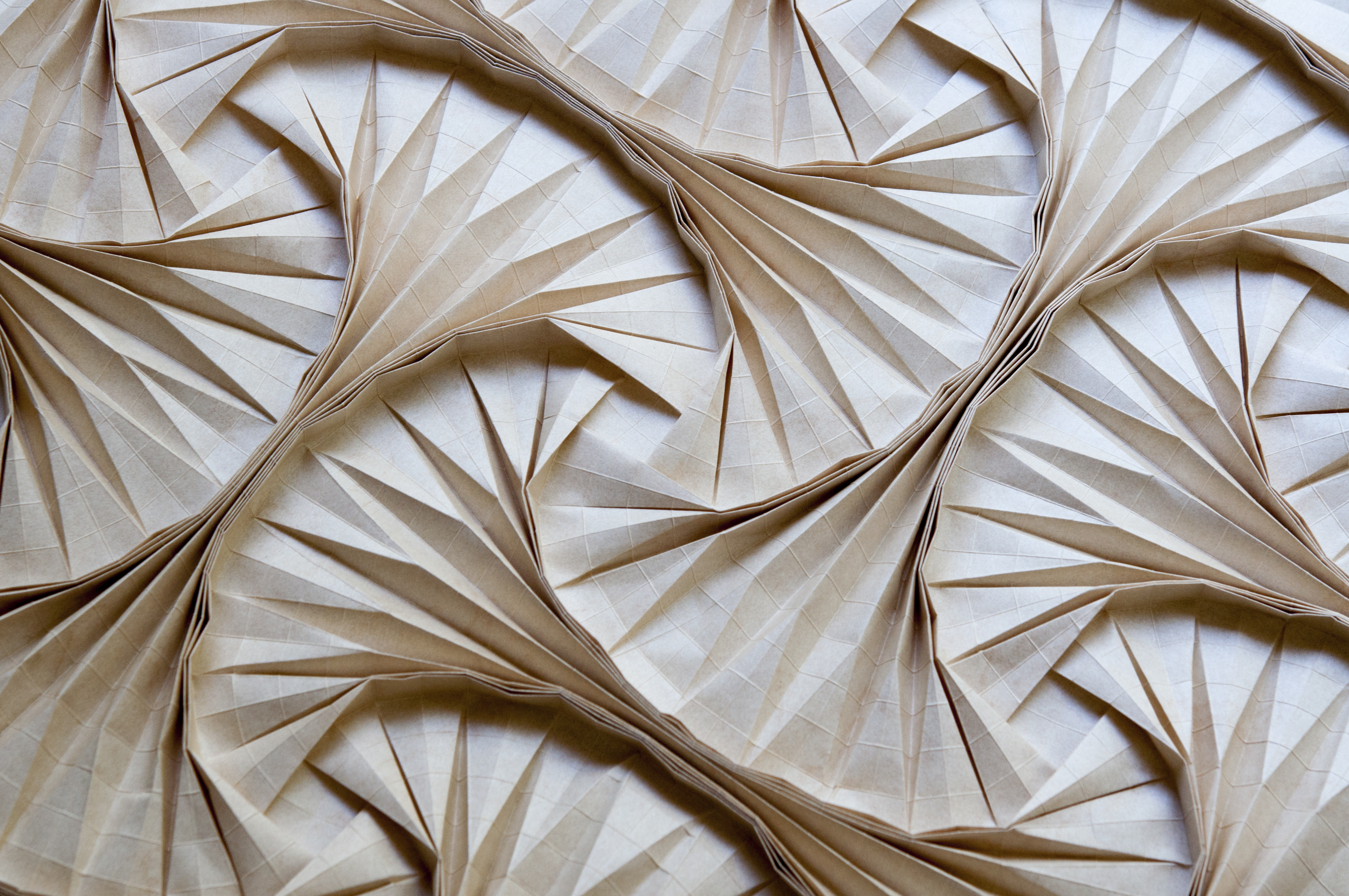
"Adulthood"

== Design ==
In 2010 Garibi met architect Gal Gaon, the owner of Talents Design gallery in Tel Aviv, who guided him into the design world. The first project for the gallery was to design origami lamps for Aqua Creations design studio. The series was developed with the studio's employee Ofir Zucker, and was called Molecules. It was presented during Milan Design Week 2011, and still being sold (2020). Later on, in 2012, Garibi collaborated with Zucker again to make a series of concrete vases using folded paper as the mold. In 2013 Garibi designed wall tiles for Kaza Concrete, based on his original origami tessellation.

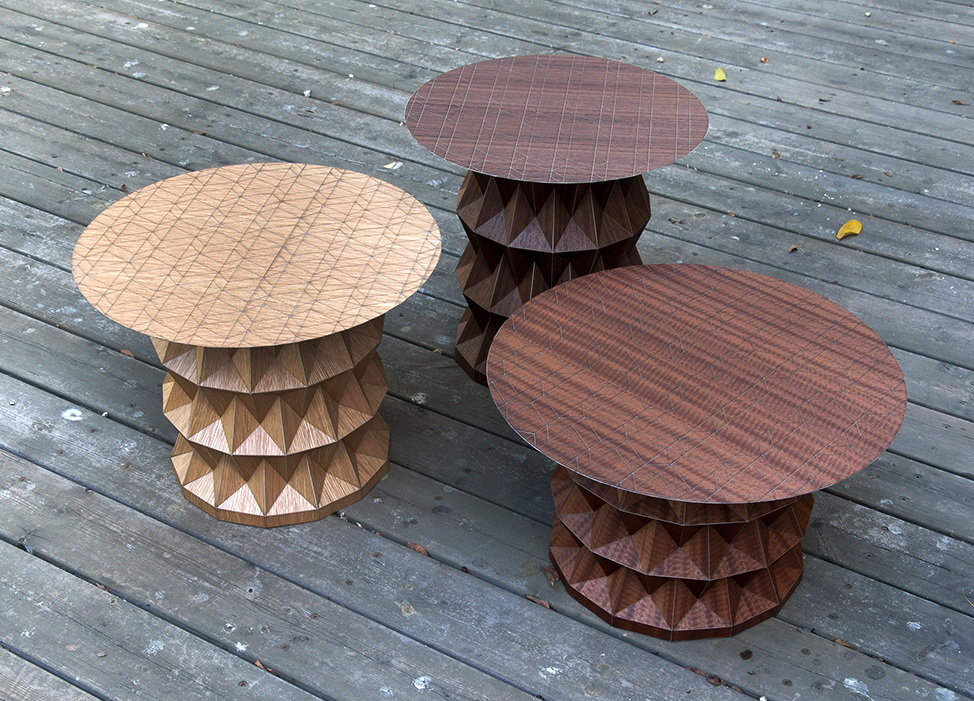
Wood Oriental Table

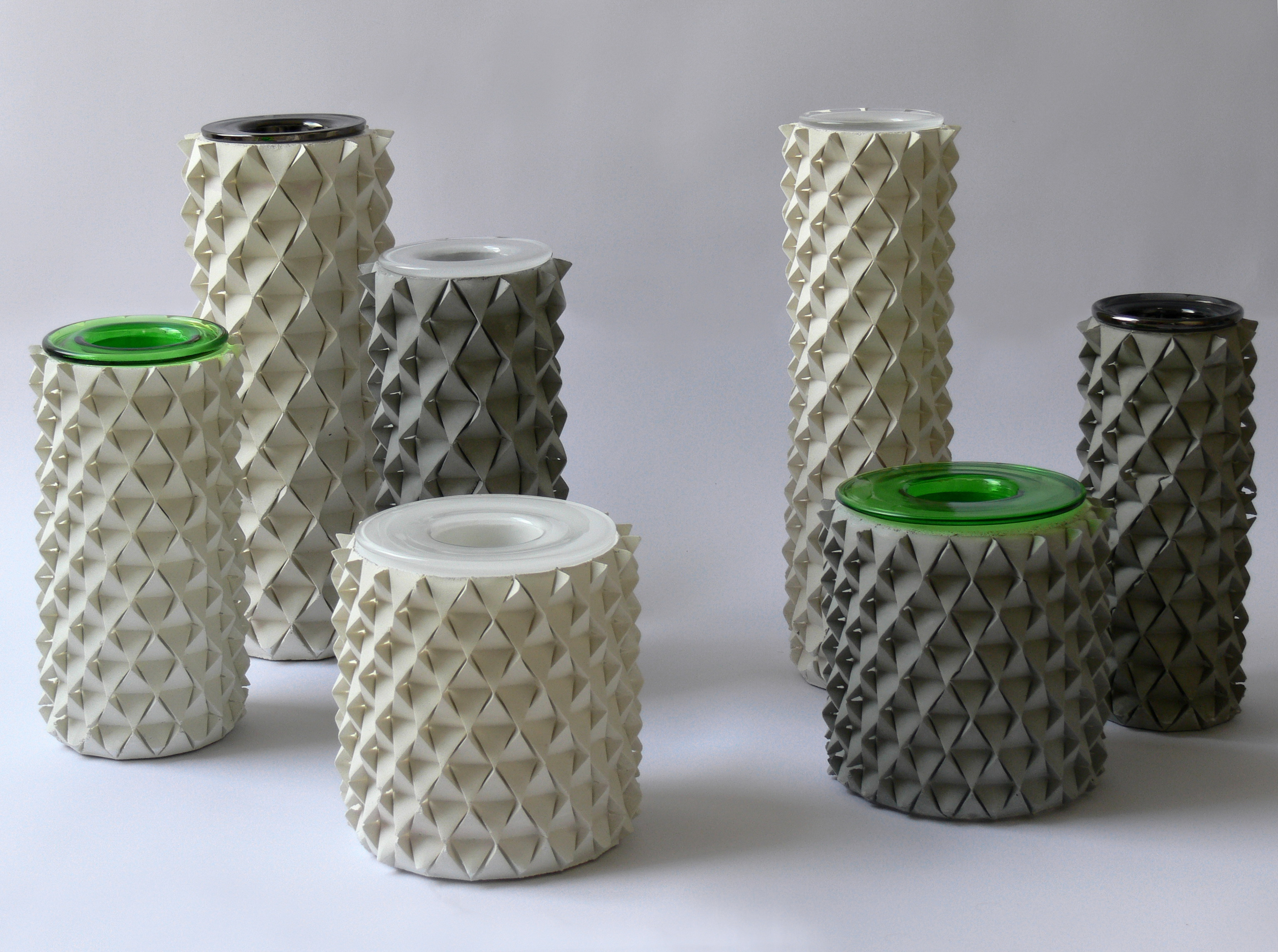
"Palms" vase series, concrete cast in paper models, with Ofir Zucker - 2012

In 2012 Garibi learned how to fold metal sheets, using laser cutting. The technique is based on several steps: the cutting pattern is planned and diagramed according to the fold lines of the paper design; the file is sent to a laser machine to cut a metal sheet; after cutting the metal sheet is moved to a clean environment and then hand folded according to the original design. Garibi started to work with plain stainless steel and later on moved to mirror finishing stainless steel. The folded mirror creates a multi-facet reflection that gives the art pieces a unique look. Garibi designed several collections with this technique, that were presented in various exhibitions during the years 2013-2019. The collections include works of art and works of design, such as tables, lamps, wall tiles and more.

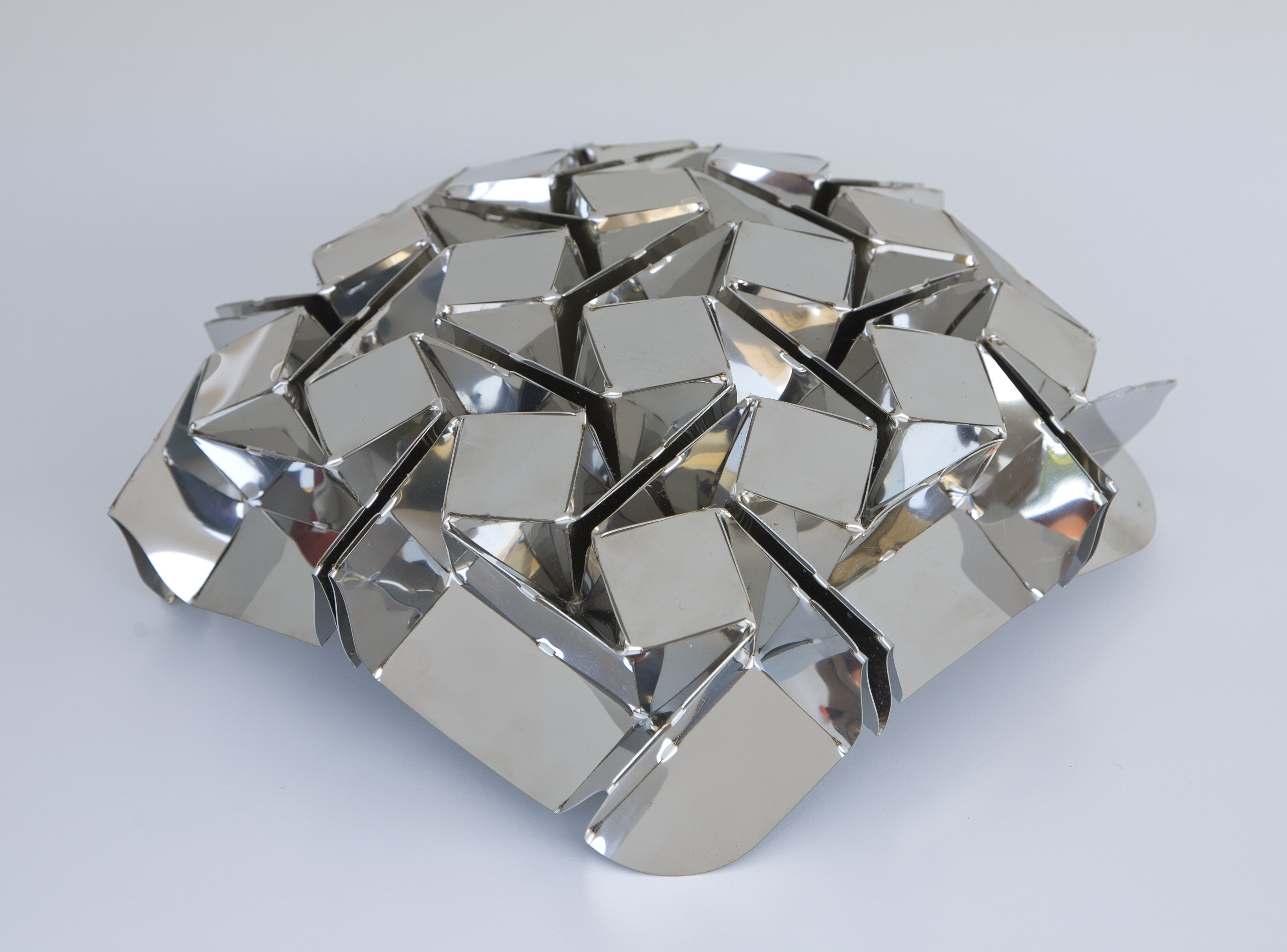
Metal cubes - 2012

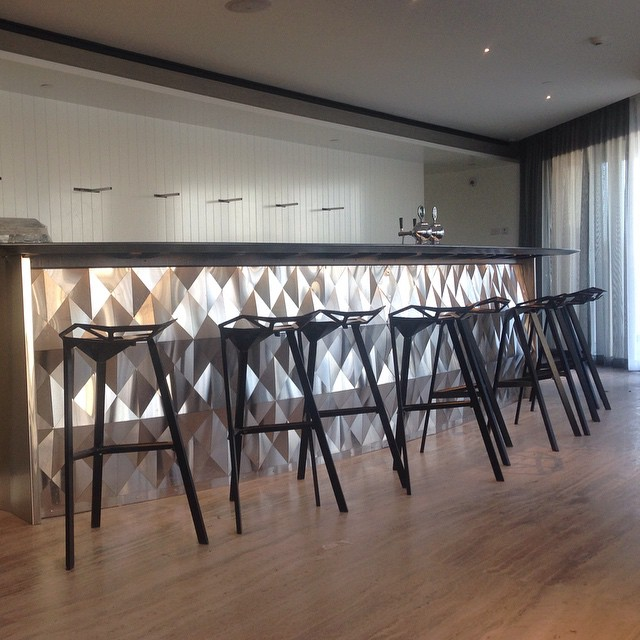
Bar table at the Herods hotel in Herzliya. Folded from two sheets of stainless steel with brushed finish, 2015

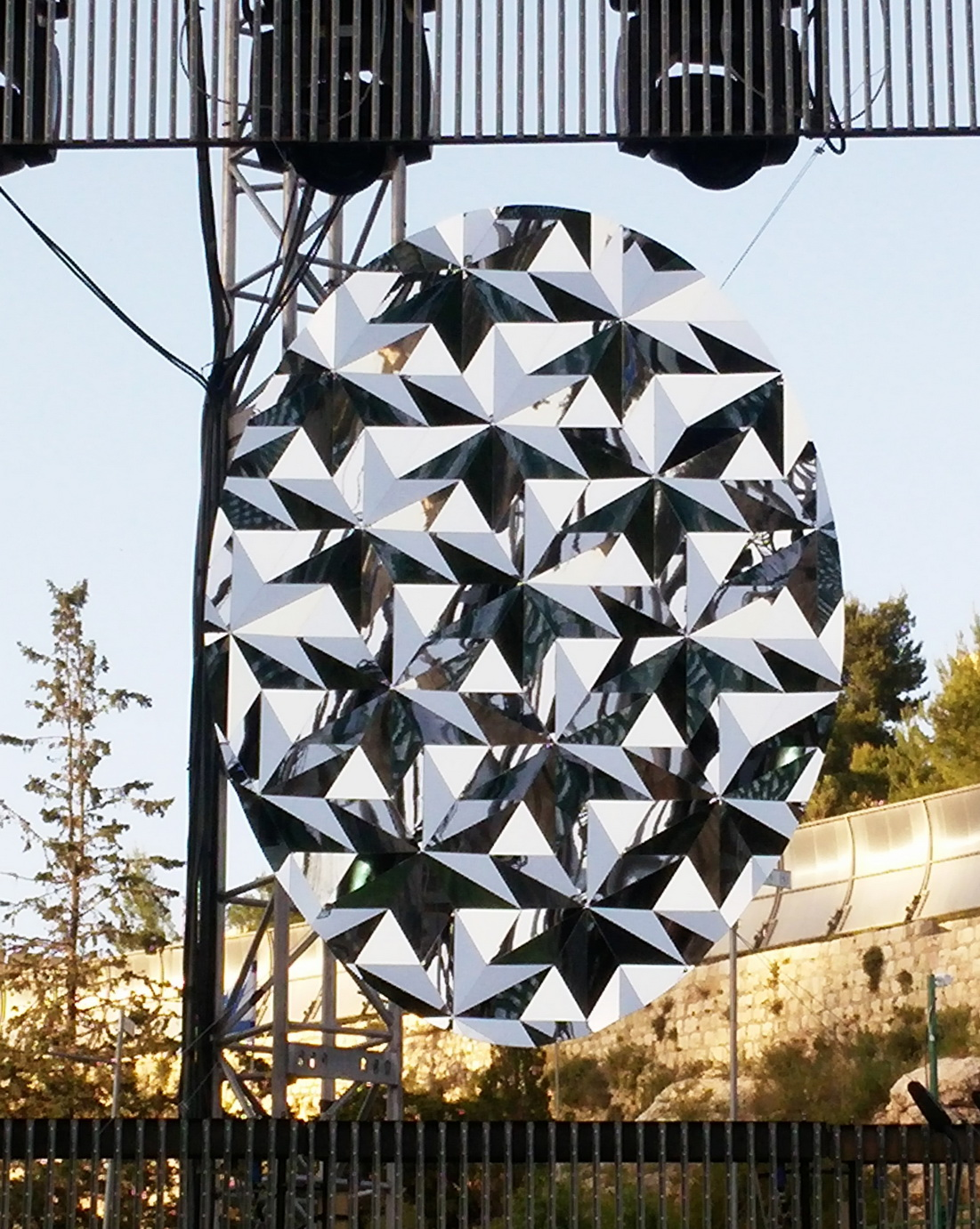
"Faberege Egg" wall installation, 2015

In 2014 Garibi started making jewelry. His first collection was called “Paper Wood Metal”. The series included bracelets, pendants, and rings made out of folded brass sheets, and folded wood. The brass was prepared with photochemical etching technique.

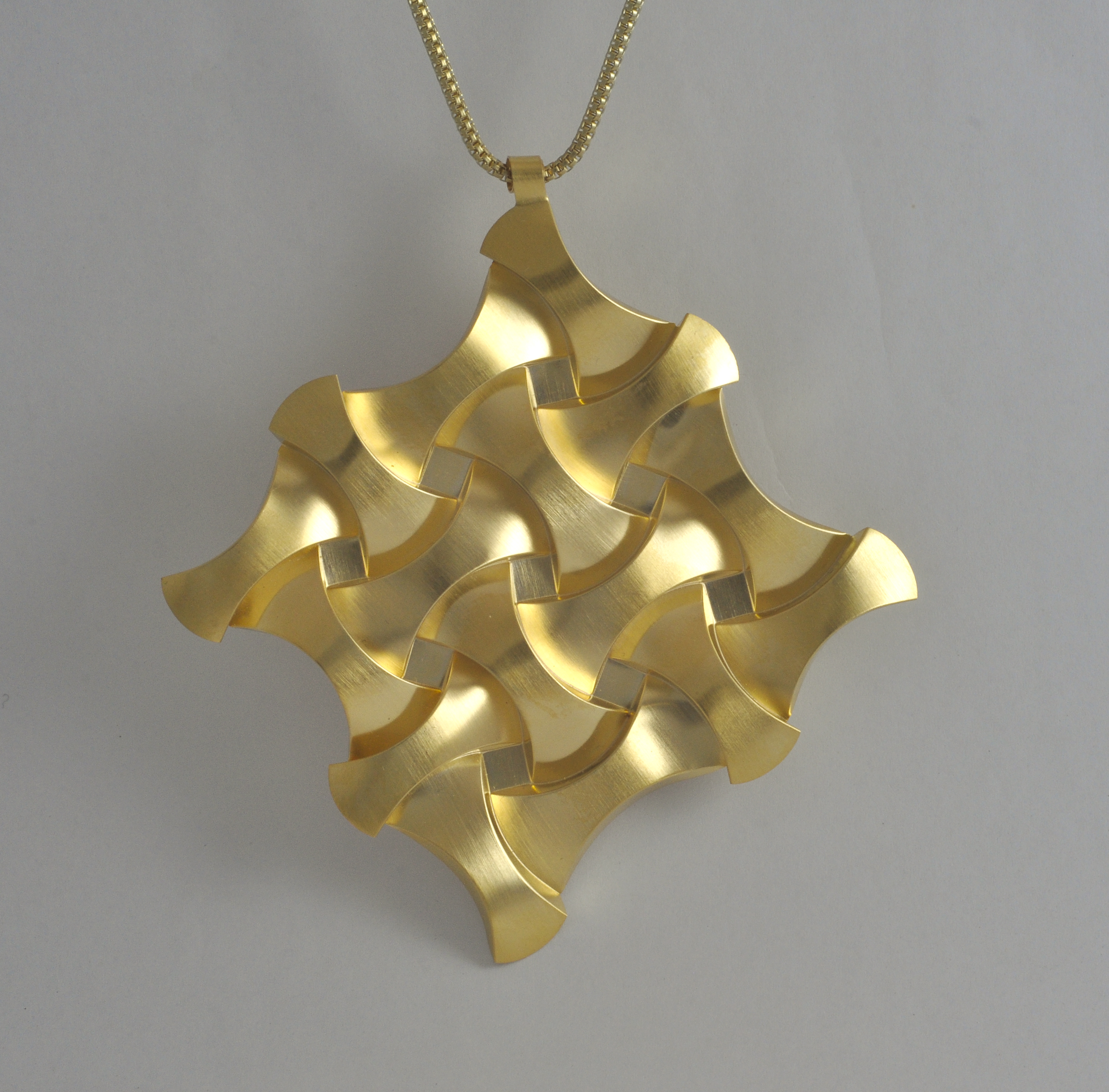

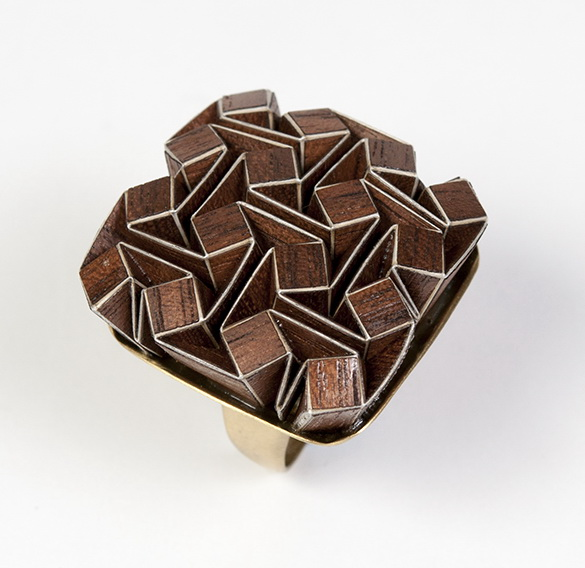

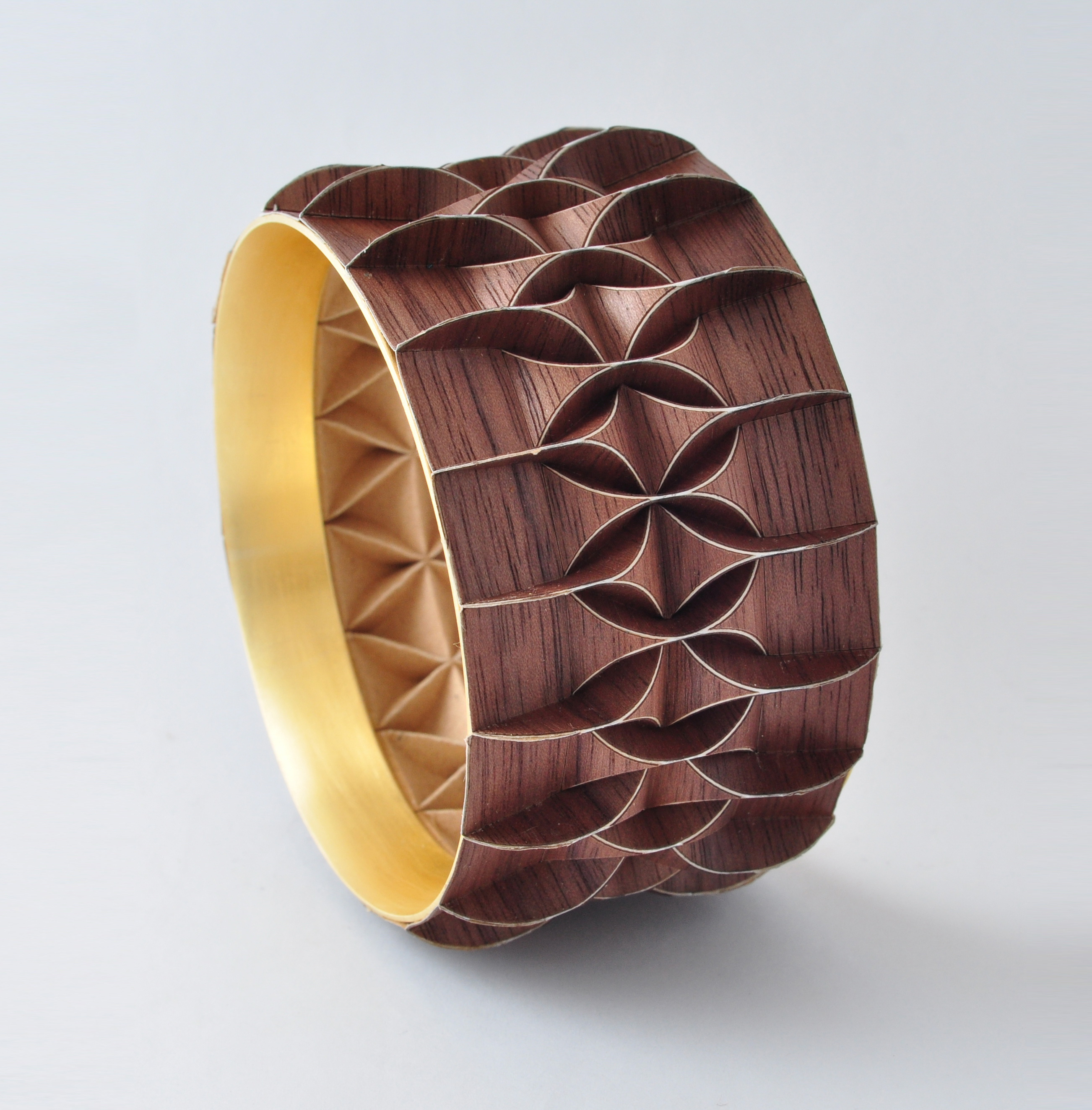

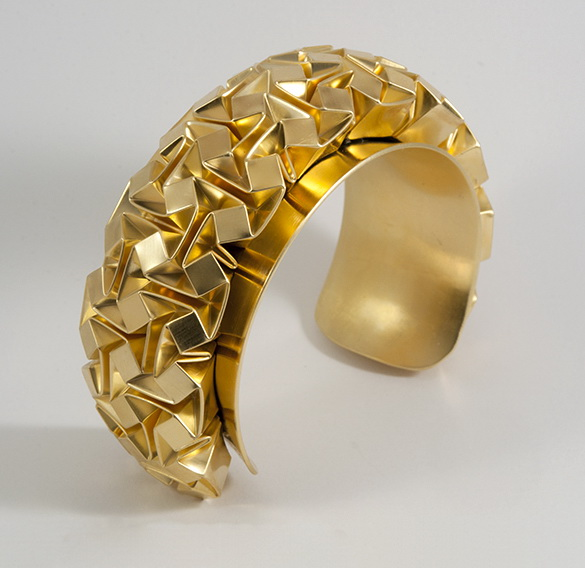

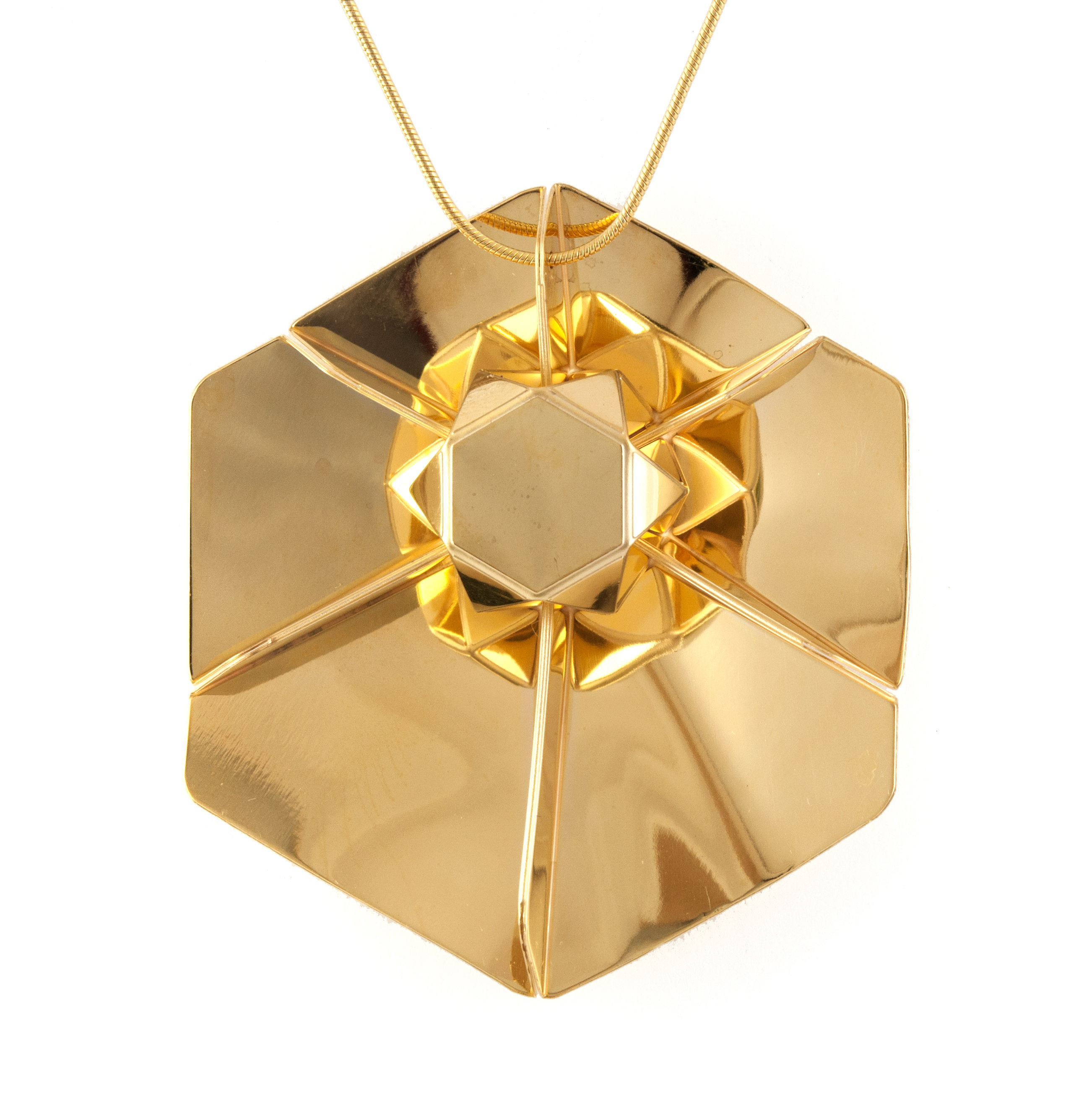

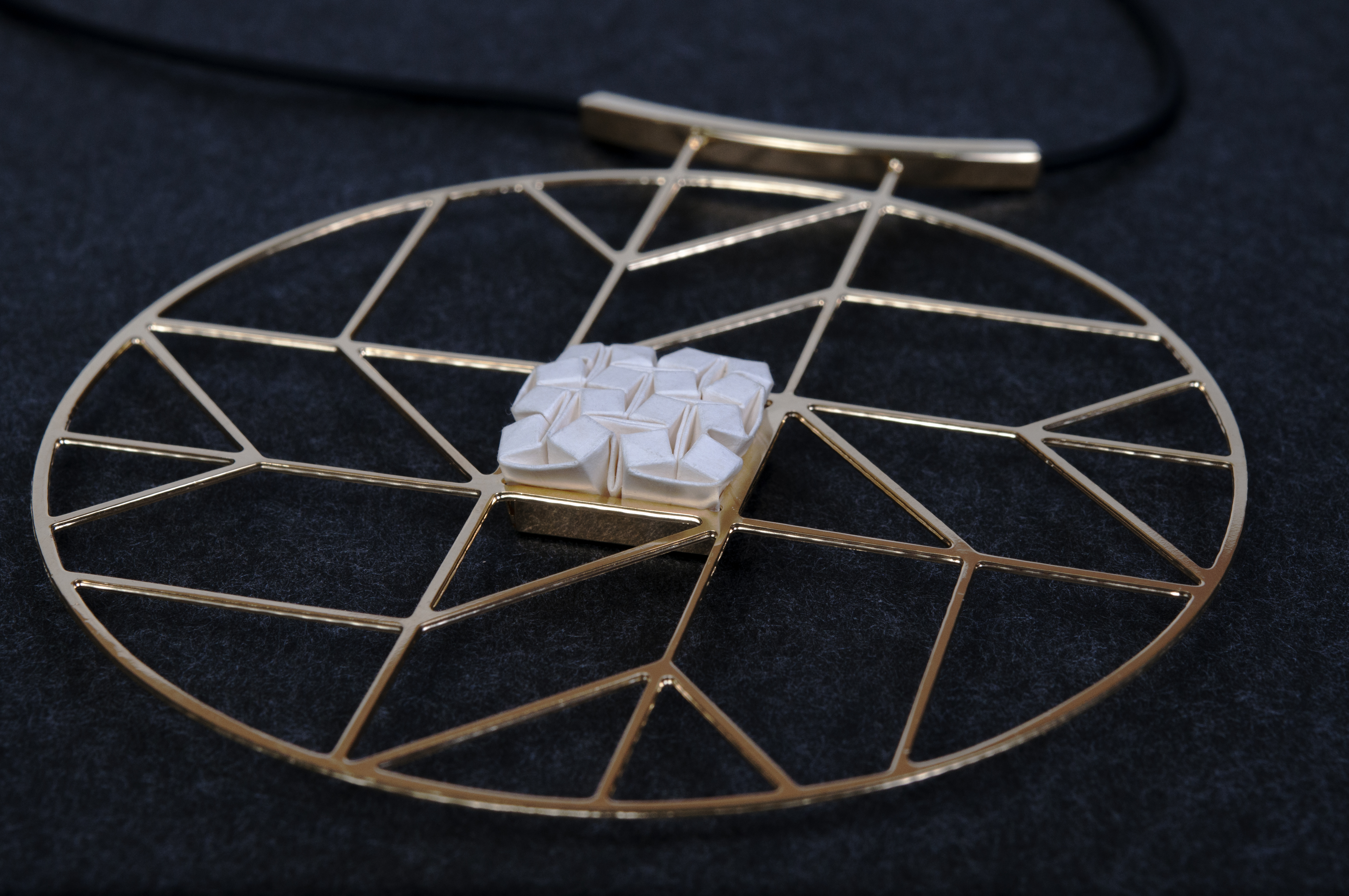

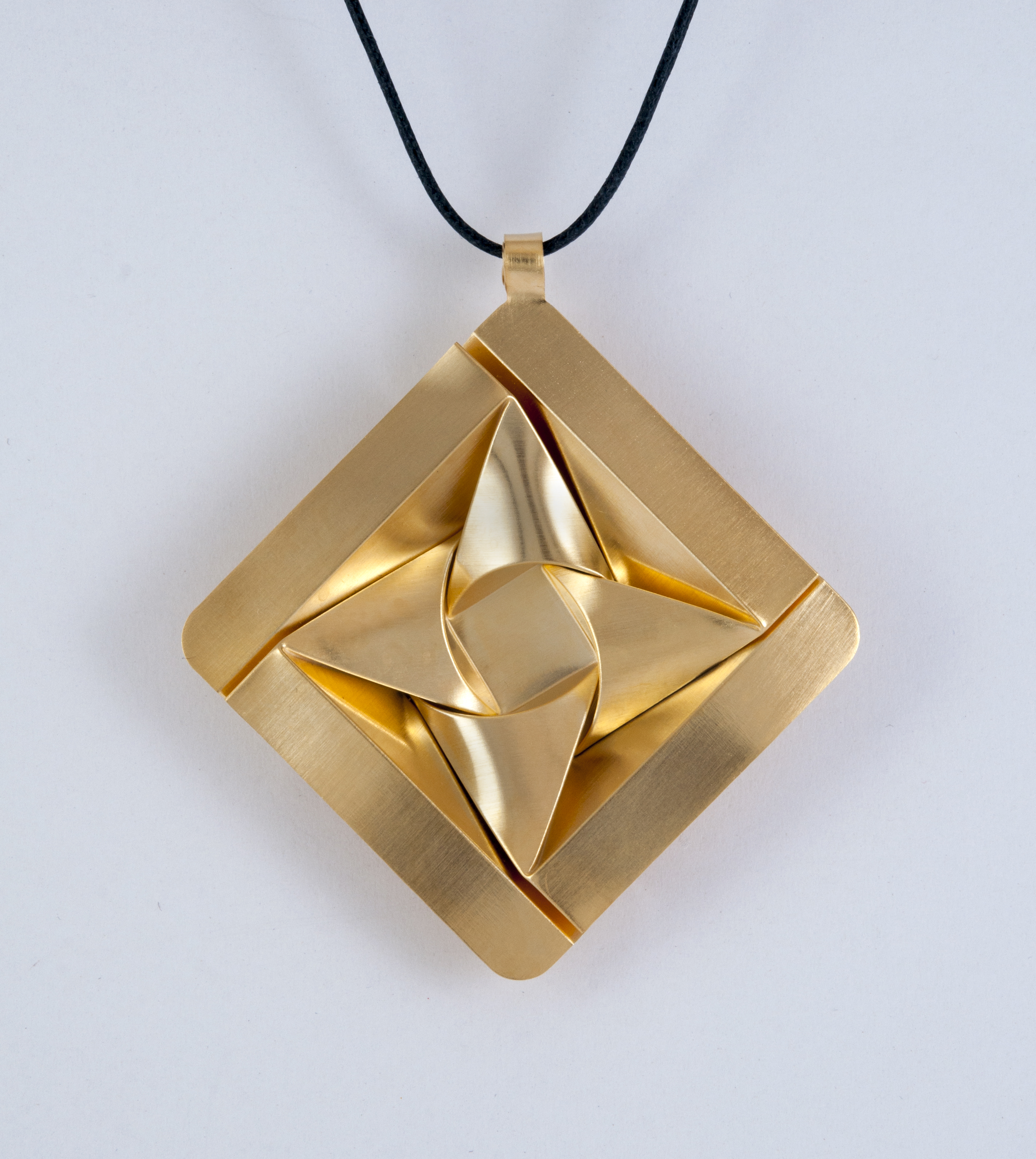

During the years Garibi tried his hands with a variety of materials such as leather, fabric, glass, cement, brass, aluminum, iron, copper, stainless steel, ceramic, and plastic.

Since 2013 Garibi is part of the academic staff in Holon Institute of Technology, in both the Interior Design and the Industrial Design departments.

== Exhibitions ==
Garibi's works have been presented in several solo exhibitions, such as "Origami Space" at the Bavli gallery, Tel Aviv 2014; "Intricate Simplicity" at the FROOTS gallery, Beijing 2017; and a solo exhibition at "Fresh Paint 11" Fair, Tel Aviv 2019, presenting rust and mirror stainless steel works.

He also participated in many group exhibitions and fairs, some of which are: "Fresh Paint" Fair, with Gal Gaon Gallery, Tel Aviv 2013-2016; "MiArt" Trade Fair, Milan 2013-2014; "Brand New World", Milan 2015; Shanghai art Fair, 2016; and “The expression of geometry, origami mix of media”, EMOZ, Zaragoza 2019. In early 2019 he won the first place of an International Postcard Exhibition by the Surface Gallery, London with the work "The World is not Flat".

Garibi also curated several exhibitions, such as "Paper Creatures" (2016) and "Paper Heroes" (2017), at the Old Jaffa Museum.

Some of his permanent installations include: "The Duchess", a wall work installed at the bar of The Duchess restaurant in Amsterdam, stainless steel with mirror finish (2015); and Bavli Park Tessellated Wall, 48 meters long, hand-folded stainless steel (2014).

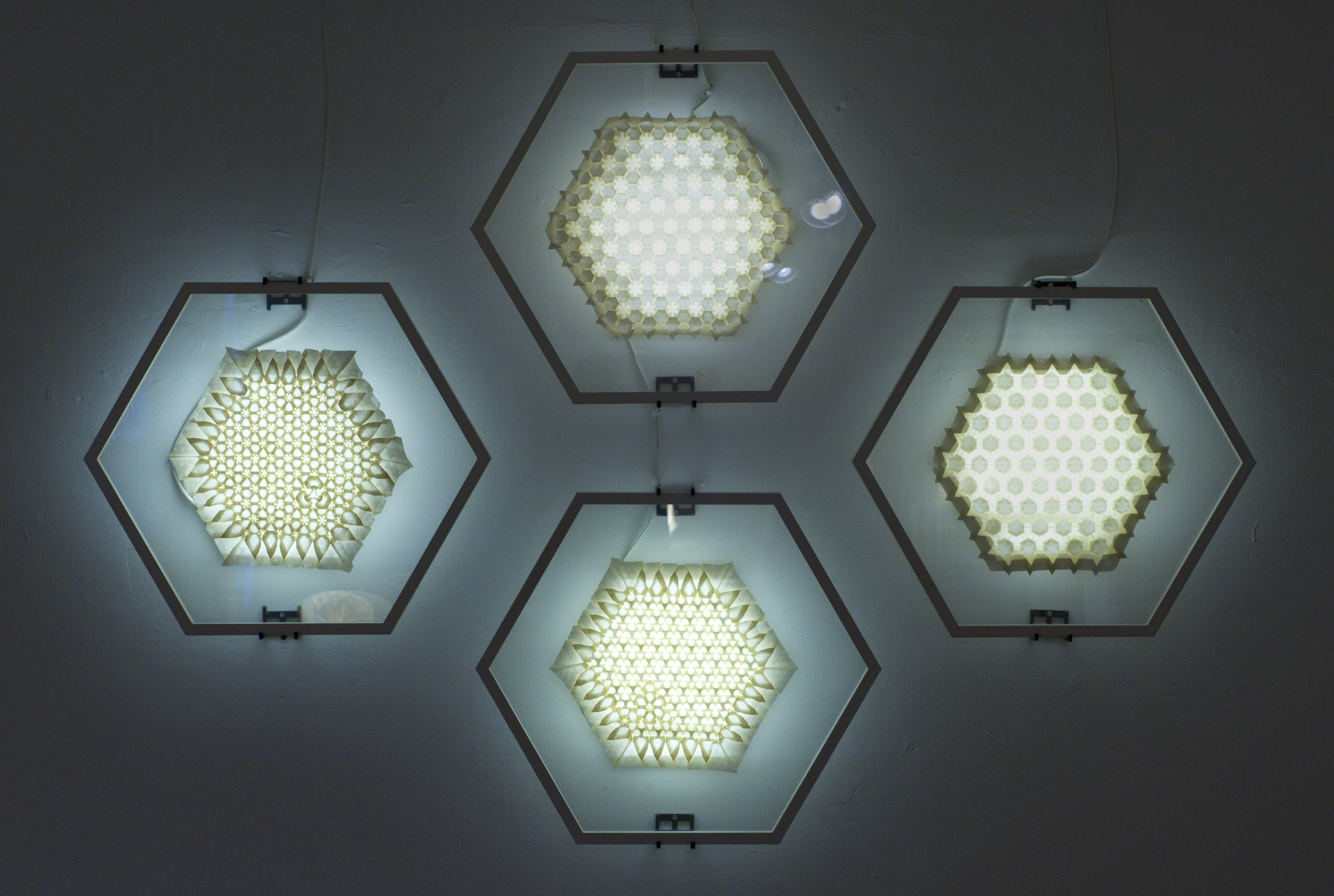
Hankin Gallery, Holon 2011

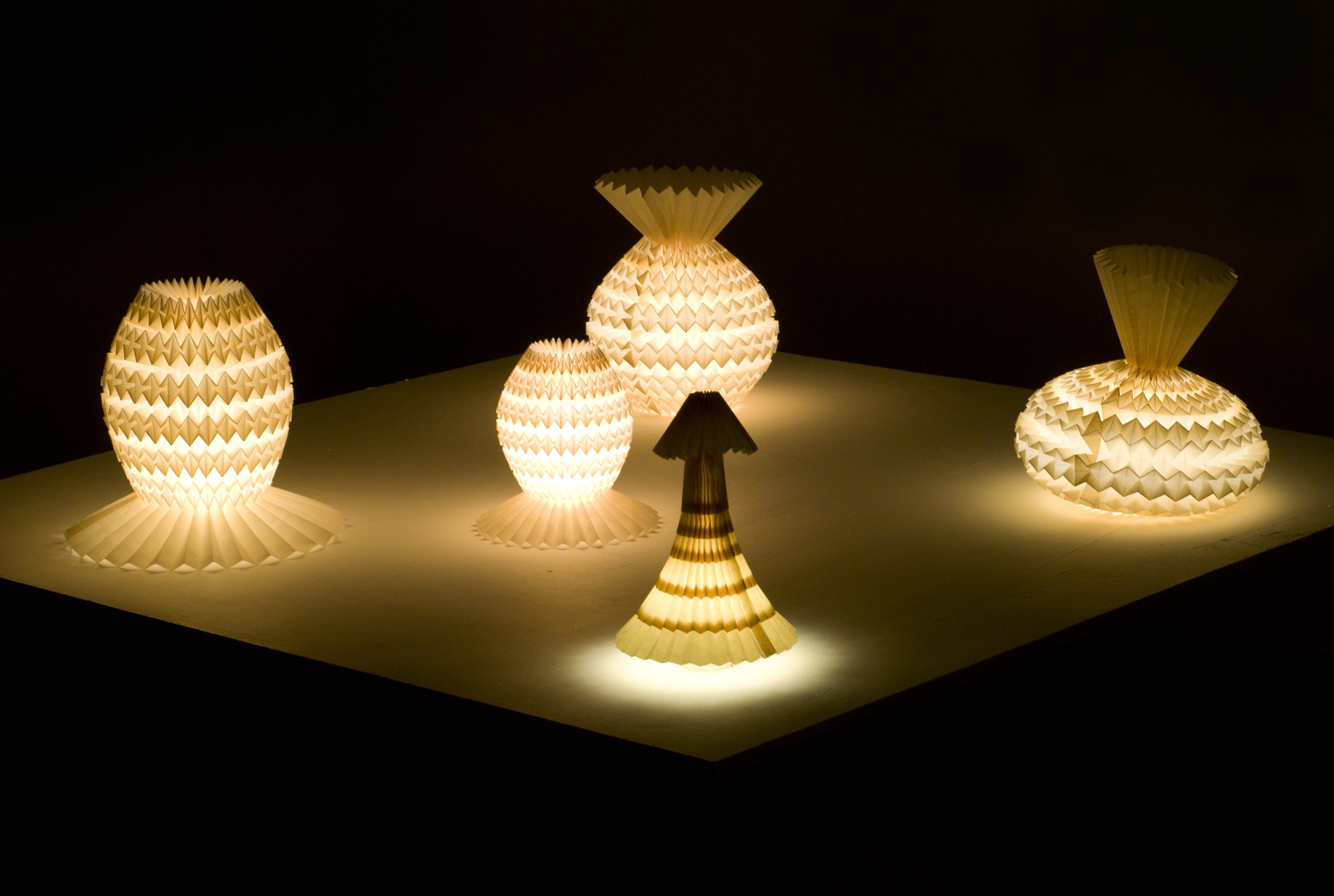
Hankin Gallery, Holon 2011

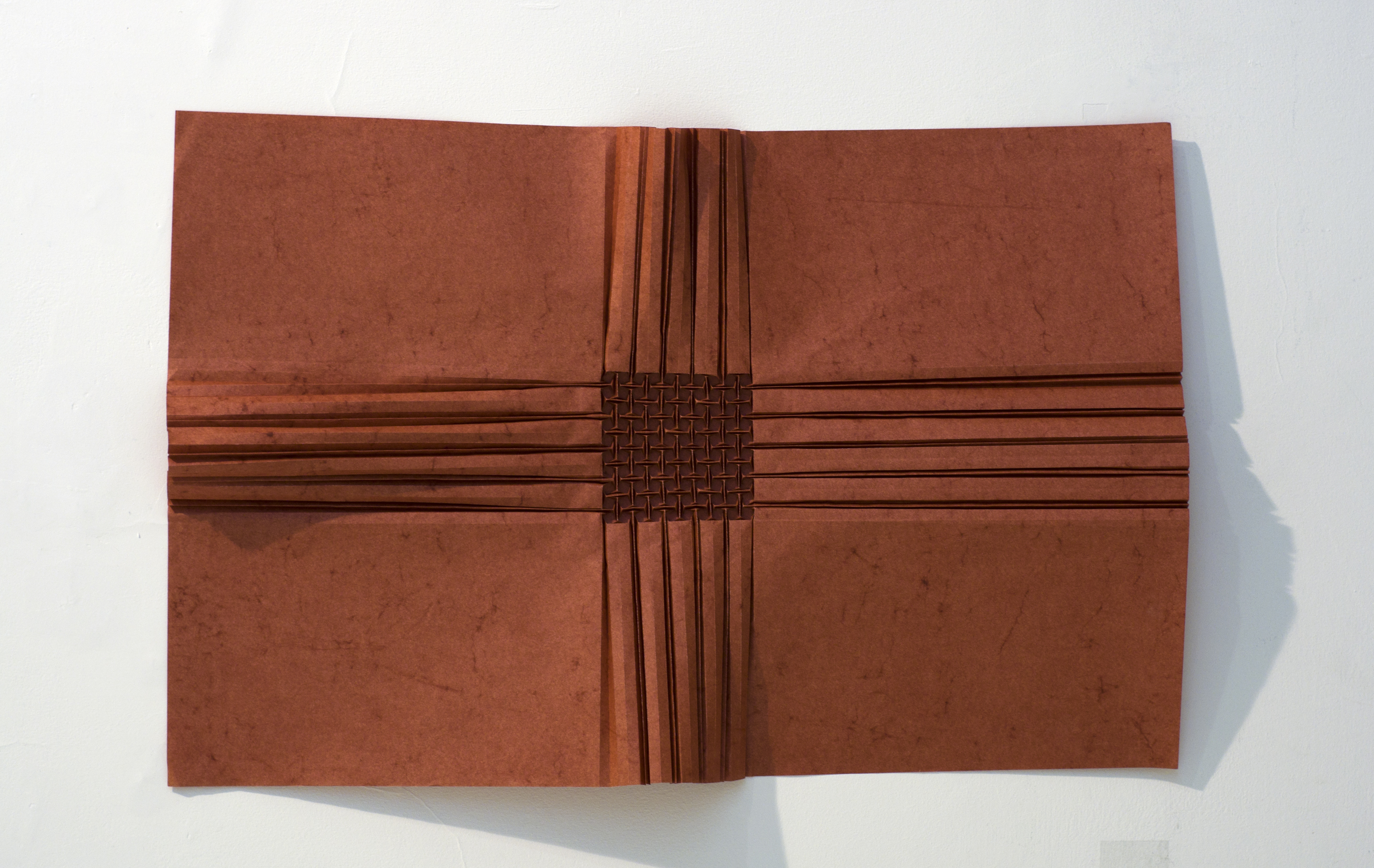
Rehovot 2012

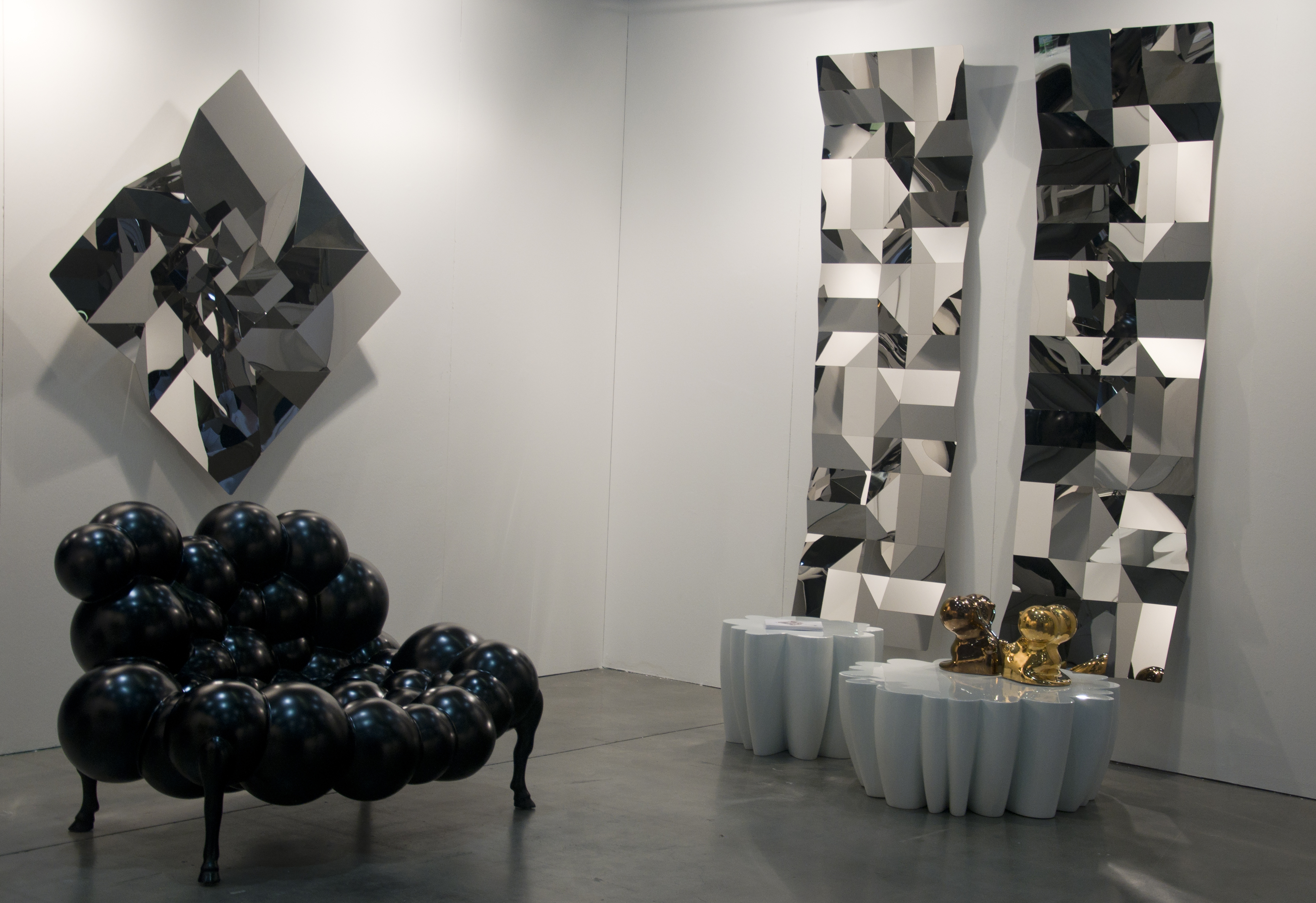
MiArt, Milan 2013

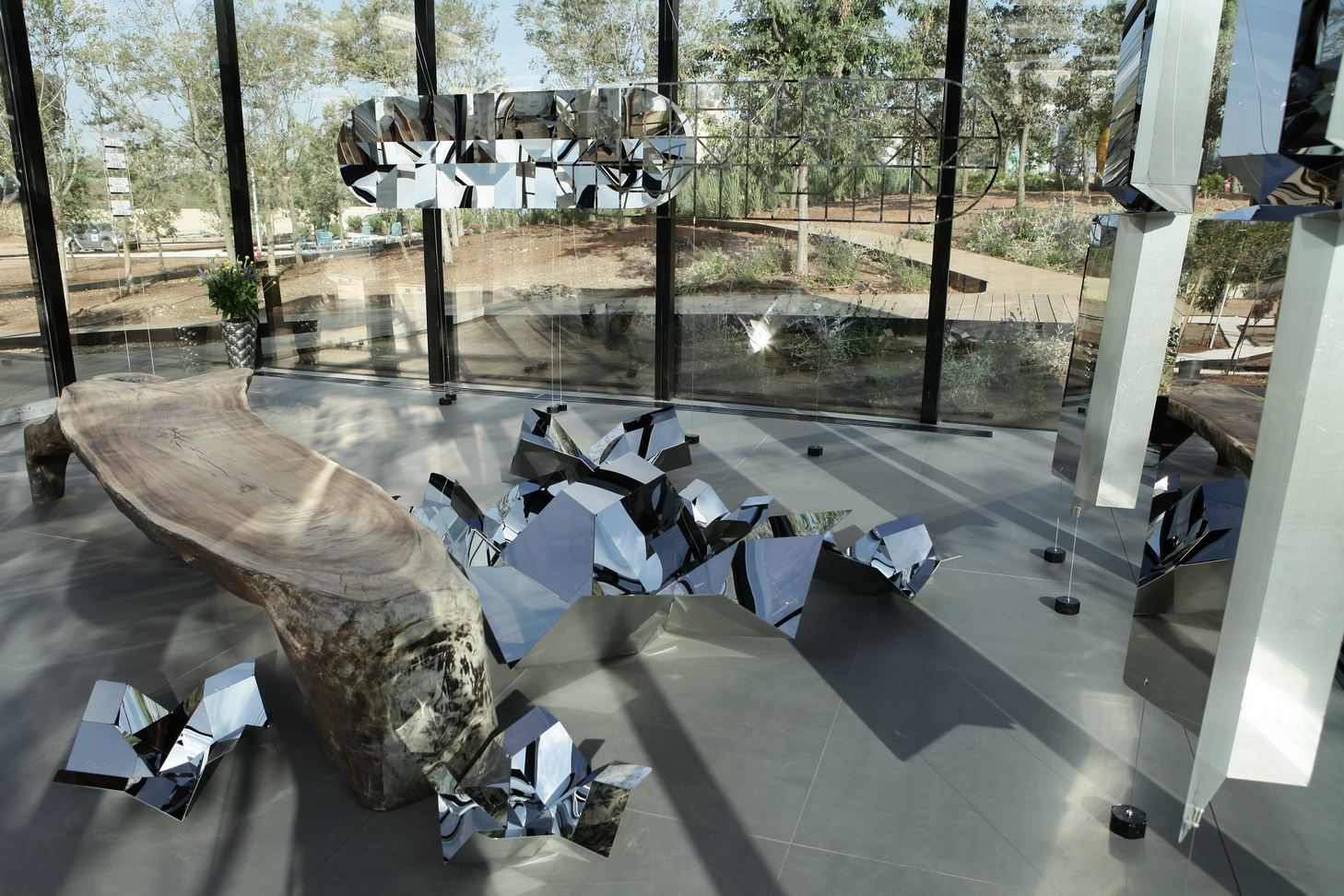
Bavli Gallery, Tel Aviv 2013

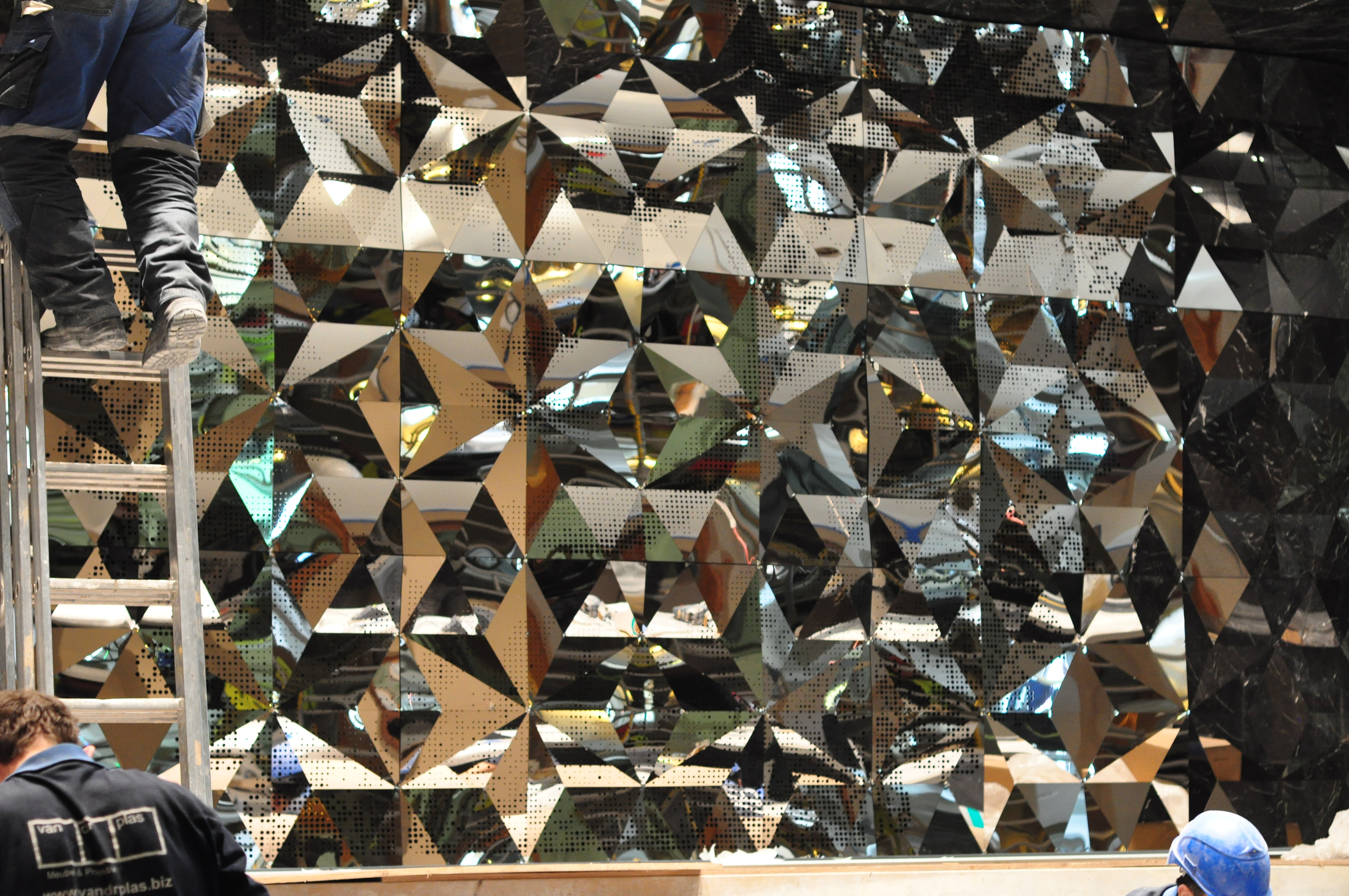
"The Duchess", 2015

== Publications ==
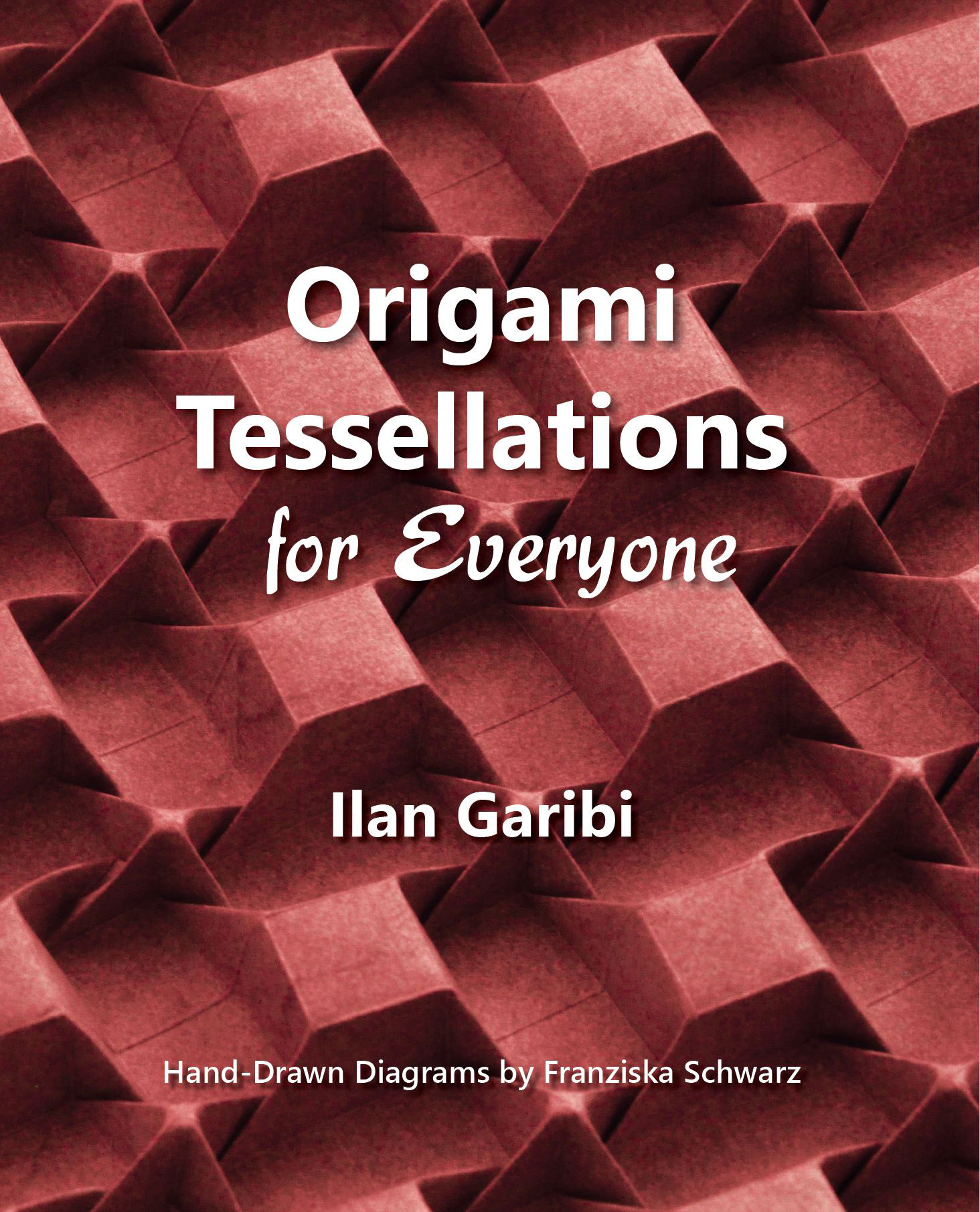

- Garibi, Ilan (2018). Origami Tessellations for Everyone. ISBN 978-9659270002.
- Garibi, Ilan; Goodman, David; Elran, Yossi (2018). The Paper Puzzle Book: All You Need is Paper!. World Scientific. ISBN 978-9813202405.
- Goodman, David; Garibi, Ilan (2018). The Tangram Puzzle Book: A New Approach to the Classic Pieces. World Scientific. ISBN 978-9813234000.
- Goodman, David; Garibi, Ilan (2019). The Soma Puzzle Book: A New Approach to the Classic Pieces. World Scientific. ISBN 978-9813275317.
- Garibi, Ilan (2020). The Two-minute Puzzle Book: Puzzles to Train Your Brain. World Scientific. ISBN 978-9811217753.
