= Dorit Levinstein =

Israeli sculptor and painter

Dorit Levinstein דורית לבינסון
- Born: 1956 (age 69–70)
- Education: Technion - Institute of Technology
- Known for: Painting, sculpture
- Patrons: Cathia Klimovsky

Dorit Levinstein (Hebrew: דורית לבינסון; born in 1956 in Haifa, Israel) is a sculptor and painter. She is best known for her unique approach to working with painted bronze sculptures, which incorporate aspects of Chinese philosophy and its relation to movement and immediate environments. Levinstein’s sculptures have been exhibited worldwide including at The Royal Academy (London).

== Career ==
After graduating from the Technion School of Technology in 1978 where she received a degree in graphic design with a concentration in illustration, Levinstein continued studying painting and sculpture at the Avni Institute of Art and Design. From 1985 to 1988 Levinstein taught art at the Avni Institute of Art and Design and in 1988 she was awarded a prize for excellence by the Soho Gallery in New York.

In 1989 Levinstein started to experiment with new artistic approaches, synthesizing painting and sculpture and developing a unique style where she could project contradictory aspects of her own personality. This process led her to create several works in painted wood and aluminum. This gradually developed into the painted bronze sculptures she is currently known for. In the book "Sculptures of Dorit Levinstein" by author Miriam Smilan, Levinstein described her approach to her work: "I don't make any preliminary sketches. I work intuitively in my studio ‘drawing’ three-dimensional figures in space. Intense concentration is required. In a way, it's like a choreography of matter. All the information and details needed must be included in one continuous, flowing line."

Levinstein’s work can be found in private collections around the world, and is exhibited in many prominent galleries in cities including New York, Lyon, San Francisco, Jerusalem, Tel Aviv, Singapore, Palma de Mallorca, Berlin, Hamburg, Istanbul, Verbier, Nuenen, Munich, Paris, Kuala Lumpur, Hertfordshire, Saint Tropez, Geneva, Bordeaux, Forte Dei Marmi, Düsseldorf, Saint Tropez, Konstanz, Bordeaux, Marseille, Chicago, New Delhi, and many others. She has also produced several indoor and outdoor commissioned works for numerous municipalities and locations worldwide, including the Hotel Majestic Barrière, The Plaza Athénée, The New York Palace Hotel, and many others.

== Style and influences ==
Levinstein has been influenced over the years by artists such as Cezanne, Gaudi, Klimt and Niki de Saint Phalle as well as American Pop Artists and Modern sculptors. Her sculptural work is identified by three main periods: 'The Classical Bronze Period', 'The Stone and Mixed Media', and the current 'Colorful Linear Figures' made mostly of bronze and also of aluminum. One of the main features of her works are their colorful patterns and delicate lines.

== Significant works ==
I LOVE ICONS COLLECTION

- MARILYN MONROE
- FRIDA KAHLO WITH A RED BOW
- MICHAEL JACKSON
- BART SIMPSON
- BARBIE
- ELVIS
- WOODY ALLEN
- LOUIS ARMSTRONG
- AMY WINEHOUSE
- QUEEN ELIZABETH
- CHE GUEVARA
- DAME EDNA
- BUDDHA
- STATUE OF LIBERTY
- THE BEATLES

STUDYING THE MASTERS COLLECTION

- THE RIDER
- PICASSO DOVE
- FLUTIST
- MOTHER AND CHILD
- VENUS
- FRIDA WITH A RED BOW
- FRIDA
- WOMAN WITH A HAT
- SUNFLOWERS
- MATISSE DANCERS
- RENOIR DANCERS
- L'HOMME QUI MARCHE
- NIKE

CHARACTERS COLLECTION

- TANGO
- LA CUMPARISTA
- SALSA
- FAMILY
- SWING
- WINNER
- SWEET KISS
- JUGGLER
- BIKER
- FAN LADY
- POKER FACE

ANIMALS COLLECTION

- ROYAL KISS
- LOVE STORY
- BUTTERFLY
- PRAYING MANTIS
- HOOD HOOD
- COW
- FLAMINGO
- EDEN BIRD
- BIG BIRD
- PEACE DOVE
- PEGASUS
- OWL
- LION KING
- SHEEP
- REX THE DOG
- COUPLE OF DOGS
- DEAR DEER
- WORKING GIRL
- SLOW MOTION
- EAGLE
- ROOSTER
- SPIRAL FISH
- LUCKY FISH
- AQUARIUM

TYPOGRAPHIC COLLECTION

- LOVE
- @RT
- STAR
- HA HA HA
- AMOR
- ART

ZODIAC COLLECTION

- ARIES
- TAURUS
- GEMINI
- CANCER
- LEO
- VIRGO
- LIBRA
- SCORPIO
- SAGITTARIUS
- CAPRICORN
- AQUARIUS
- PISCES

== See also ==
- Visual arts in Israel
- List of public art in Israel
