= Nachume Miller =

Nachume Miller (Hebrew: נחום מילר; 1949–1998) was an Israeli artist who immigrated to New York City in 1973, where he made a name for himself in the American Modern Art scene. Miller's parents were both Holocaust survivors. His father was a captain in the front lines of the Russian Army during World War II and his mother was a Lithuanian who had once been held captive in a concentration camp. Both escaped the Nazis, re-united and fled to Israel. Nachume was born during their voyage, in Frankfurt, Germany, on January 28, 1949. He grew up in the town of Holon, Israel, where he was inspired by his father who spent most of his post-war days carving elaborate wood sculptures of Cubist human forms. Nachume, on the contrary, excelled in painting.

By the age of 16, Miller was painting elaborate surreal dream lands referencing religion, politics and the history of Modern Art. His earlier works show similarities to Hieronymus Bosch, Salvador Dalí and Francisco Goya. Miller was enlisted in the Israeli Army where he worked as one of Ariel Sharon's personal assistants and also fought in the 1973 Yom Kippur War. He went to New York in 1966 to study at the School of Visual Arts, and joined the faculty in 1977 to teach painting and drawing.

== Exhibitions ==
Selected One-Person Exhibitions

- 1976: "Drawing Show", Bertha Urdang Gallery, New York
- 1981: "Figures", A&M Artwork, New York
- 1988: Exit Art, New York; "Projects: Nachume Miller", Museum of Modern Art, New York
- 1989: E.M. Donahue Gallery, New York
- 1990: "Nachume Miller: Views", E.M. Donahue Gallery, New York
- 1993: "Sensual Painting", E.M. Donahue Gallery, New York
- 1994: The Genia Schreiber University Art Gallery, Tel Aviv University

Selected Group Exhibitions

- 1968: "10+ For and Against", Tel Aviv
- 1970: "10+ In a Circle", Tel Aviv
- 1972: "Symbols and Imagination", Artists' Pavilion, Tel Aviv; "July '72", Gallery 220, Tel-Aviv
- 1975: "The Work of Nine Graduates of the School of Visual Arts", New York; 112 Greene Street Gallery, New York; "Group Indiscriminate", 112 Green Street Gallery, New York
- 1976: "8 Israeli Artists", Bertha Urdang Gallery, New York
- 1978: "Young American Artists", Exxon National Exhibition, Guggenheim Museum, New York
- 1979: "Three Artists", 22 Wooster Gallery, New York; "Group Show", Israel Museum, Jerusalem
- 1980: "Gallery Artists", A&M Artwork; New York; "Exaggeration", Edward Throp Gallery, New York
- 1981: The Drawing Center, New York
- 1982: Susan Caldwell Gallery, New York; "The Americans: The Collage", Contemporary Art Museum, Houston, Texas; "Summer Show", Roger Litz Gallery, New York; "Four Painters", Roger Litz Gallery, New York; "Critical Perspective", P.S.1, New York; "New Drawings in America", The Drawing Center, New York
- 1983: "Los Angeles Contemporary Exhibition (LACE)", New York - Los Angeles Exchange, Los Angeles; "Short Memory", Arta Stucio, Milan, Italy
- 1985: "Relative Meaning: The Figure in Context", Hallwalls, Buffalo, New York; Exit Art, New York
- 1986: Barbara Toll Gallery, New York; "Consensus", Exit Art, New York
- 1988: Tibor De Nagy Gallery, New York; "New Visions of the Apocalypse", Museum of Art, Rhode Island School of Design, Providence, Rhode Island; "Drawing Show", Tomoko Ligouri Gallery, New York; "Summer Show", David Bietzel Gallery, New York
- 1989: "Landscape", Tibor De Nagy Gallery, New York; "Summer '89", E.M. Donahue Gallery, New York; The Butler Institute, Ohio; "The Dark Sublime", Scott Allan Gallery, New York; "The Spectacle of Chaos", KAOS Foundation Inc., Chicago
- 1991: "Summer Show", E.M. Donahue Gallery, New York; Jean Spedden Gallery, Carlston, S.C.; "Expressive Drawings", The New York Academy of Art, New York; "Working with Wax", Tibor De Nagy Gallery, New York
- 1992: "Vision of Culture and Nature", Bratlebovo Museum and Art Center, Vermont; "Color and Subject", The Artists Museum, New York; "Three Painters", Tibor De Nagy Gallery, New York
- 1993: "Drawing Show", E.M. Donahue Gallery, New York
- 1994: "Le Temps d'un dessin", Galerie de L'ecole Des Beaux de Lorient, France
