= Paul Harrison Taylor =

English Israeli sculptor

- Born: July 12, 1957 (age 68); London, England
- Education: City and Guilds of London Art School
- Known for: Sculpture
- Awards: Foundation Yad Yosef, Ramat-Gan (1990)

Paul Harrison Taylor (born July 12, 1957, in London, England) is a sculptor of English and Israeli nationalities.

He worked as a recording engineer and producer at Decca Studios in West Hampstead, London, before finishing his studies at the City and Guilds of London art school in 1984. During his tenure in the record industry he met musicians such as Georg Solti and the Chicago Symphony Orchestra, The Moody Blues, Pink Floyd, Bing Crosby and the Goons, and was able to use his art skills creating album covers.

Taylor married an Israeli woman and moved to Jerusalem. He quickly found a studio and continued to make sculpture. Taylor was soon offered a teaching post and began a high school sculpture course in Jerusalem, introducing the varied elements of sculpture to the youth of the city, as well as taking on an additional teaching position at the Israel Museum. He continues to practice and teach stone carving, clay, and steel construction.

He won an award from Foundation Yad Yosef, Ramat-Gan, in 1990. He has exhibited his work around the globe, especially in Israel, Britain, and the United States.
