= David Mezach =

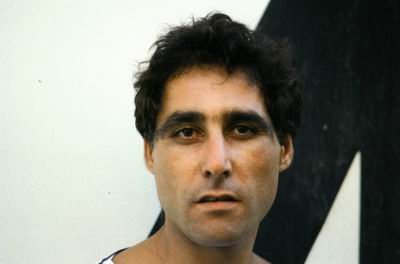
Dudu Mezach

David (Dudu) Mezach (Hebrew: דוד (דודו) מזח; born 1955) is an Israeli multidisciplinary artist. He was the head of the Screen-Based Arts Department at Bezalel Academy of Arts and Design until September 2017.

David Mezach was born in Haifa. He graduated from the Bezalel Academy of Arts and Design in 1981. In July–August 2006, Mezach curated and organized an end-of-the-year exhibit of the work of Bezalel students at Ben Gurion International Airport in Tel Aviv. The exhibit, Bezalel 100/Terminal, covering 15,000 square meters on two floors of the terminal, displayed thousands of works by 400 students. It was viewed by 75,000 visitors.

== See also ==
- Visual arts in Israel
