= Shlomo Narinsky =

Israeli photographer and artist (1885–1960)

- שלמה נרינסקי (נראני)
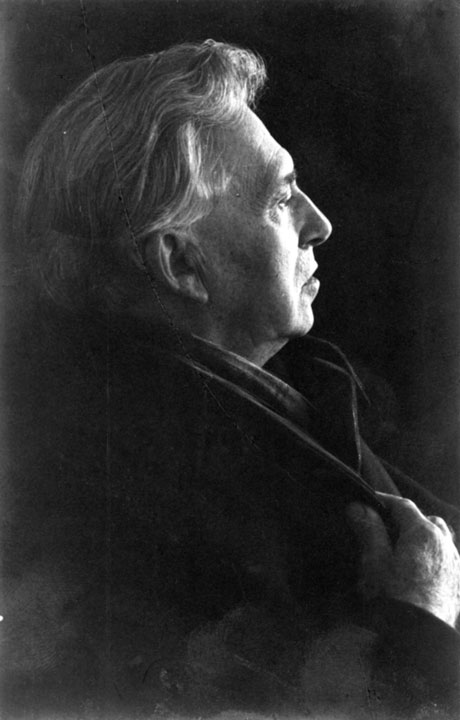
- Self Portrait, Haifa (ca. 1955)
- Born: June 9, 1885
- Died: February 8, 1960 (aged 74)

Shlomo Narinsky (Hebrew: שלמה נרינסקי; 1885–1960) was an Israeli photographer and painter who was born in the Russian Empire. In the interwar period in Paris he also adopted the name Neroni.

== Life and career ==
Narinsky was born in the village of Abyan in southern Russia, now Ukraine. He studied painting in Moscow as a child, and photography in Paris (1904) and Berlin (1905). He briefly returned to Russia after finishing his studies, but immigrated to Ottoman Palestine in 1906, where he opened a photography studio in Jerusalem called "Photographic Unity" with Yaakov Hotimsky. His wife Sonia, also a photographer, was a partner in the studio. While he was there, he made a postcard collection of Palestine. Narinsky's photography was influenced by the works of 19th-century European photographers. When World War I came Narinsky was exiled to Egypt where he worked in photography in Alexandria and then in Cairo. He moved to Paris in 1932 and opened another photography studio. In World War II he was interned in the detention camps in Saint-Denis and Drancy and was released in 1944 as part of a prisoner exchange. The couple returned to Palestine and settled in Kibbutz Ein Harod. In the 1950s they moved to Haifa, where Shlomo Narinsky taught photography at the WIZO vocational school for girls until his death in 1960.
