= Shaul Shats =

Israeli artist

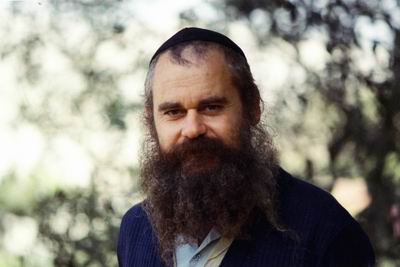
Shaul Schatz in 1989

Shaul Shats, Broshim, tempera on paper, 1990s

Shaul Shats (Hebrew: שאול שץ; born 1944) (variant names Shaul Shatz, Saul Shatz) is an Israeli painter, printmaker and illustrator, born in 1944 in Kibbutz Sarid, Israel. He studied at the Bezalel Academy of Art and Design, Jerusalem (1965–66), the Rietveld Academy, Amsterdam (1967), and the Freie Akademie, The Hague (1967). Shats taught at the Bezalel Academy from 1978–82. He won the Israel Museum Prize for Illustration (1990), the Jerusalem Prize (1992), the Ben Yitzhak Prize for Illustration of Israeli Children's Books (1992), and the Ish-Shalom Prize.

Shats continues to live and work in Jerusalem.

== Selected exhibitions ==
- 2007: Ella Gallery, Jerusalem
- 2005: Jerusalem Artists’ House, Jerusalem
- 2004: Our Landscape: Notes on Landscape Painting in Israel, University of Haifa Art Gallery, Haifa (online catalogue)
- 2003: Bineth Gallery, Tel-Aviv
- 1984: Cardo Gallery, Jerusalem
- 1971: Little Gallery, Jerusalem
- 1969: Engel Gallery, Jerusalem

== Selected collections ==
- Israel Museum, Jerusalem
- Tel Aviv Museum of Art
- Stedelijk Museum, Amsterdam
