= Shlomith Haber-Schaim =

Israeli artist (born 1926)

Shlomith Haber-Schaim שלומית הבר-שיים
- Born: 1926 (age 99–100); Tel Aviv
- Education: Bezalel Academy of Arts and Design
- Known for: Painting
- Movement: Israeli art

Shlomith Haber-Schaim (Hebrew: שלומית הבר-שיים; born 1926) is an Israeli artist.

== Biography ==
Shlomith Haber-Schaim was born in Tel Aviv in 1926. Her mother was the artist Rivkah Rieger Kaplan. She studied art in the new Bezalel Academy of Arts and Design, with Mordecai Ardon, and in Chicago. After completing her studies she moved to Boston. In 2005 she returned to Jerusalem and settled in Jerusalem. Her work is in the collection of the Smithsonian American Art Museum

== Awards and prizes ==
- 1983 Artist-in-residence, Burston Graphic Center, Jerusalem
- 1984 Artist-in-residence, Mishkenot Sha'ananim, Jerusalem
- 1994 Grant, National Endowment for the Arts, USA
- 2014 Artist-in-residence, Scuola Internazionale di Grafica, Venice, Italy
