= Ilana Shafir =

Israeli mosaic artist (1924 – 2014)

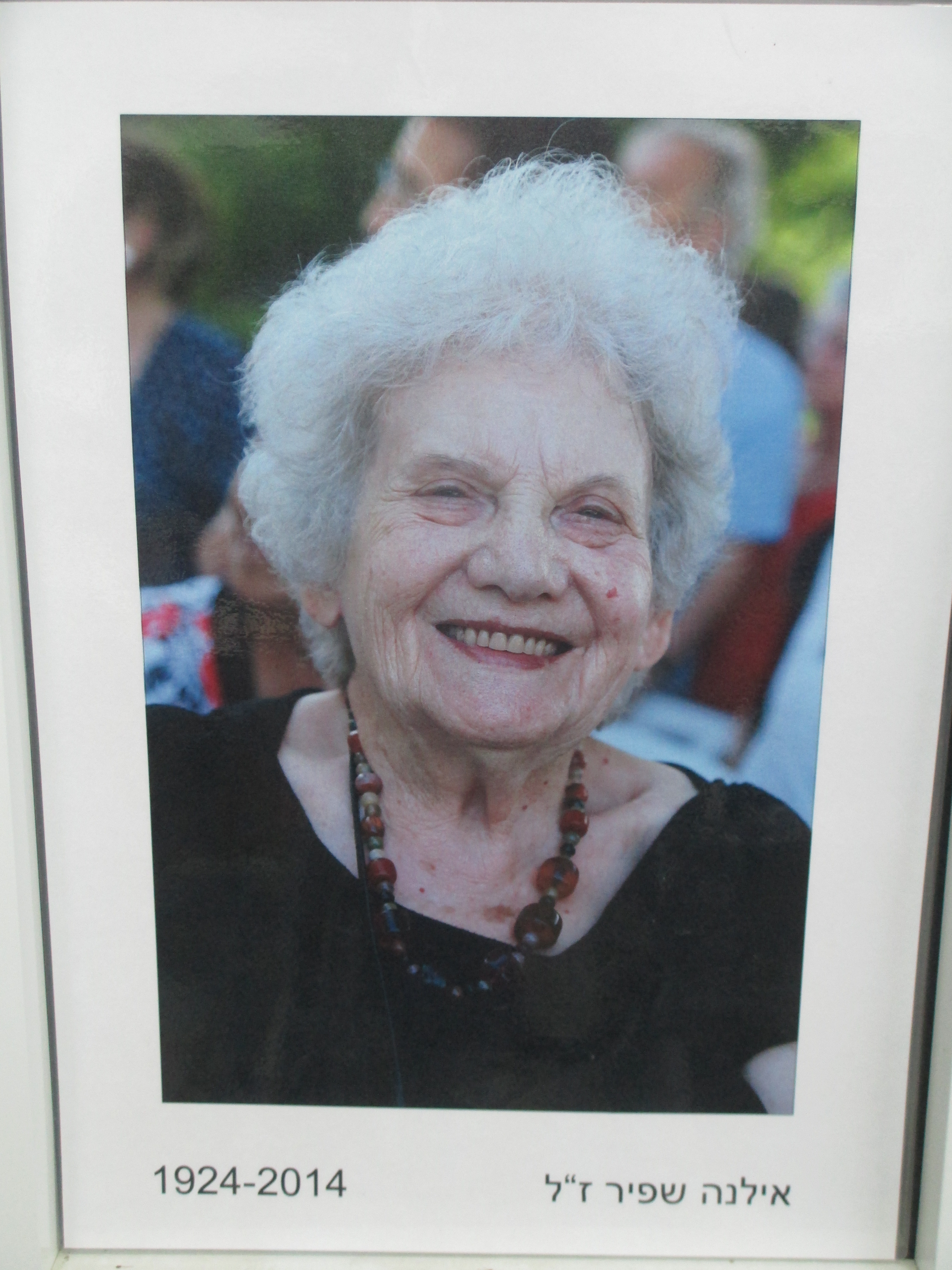
Ilana Shafir

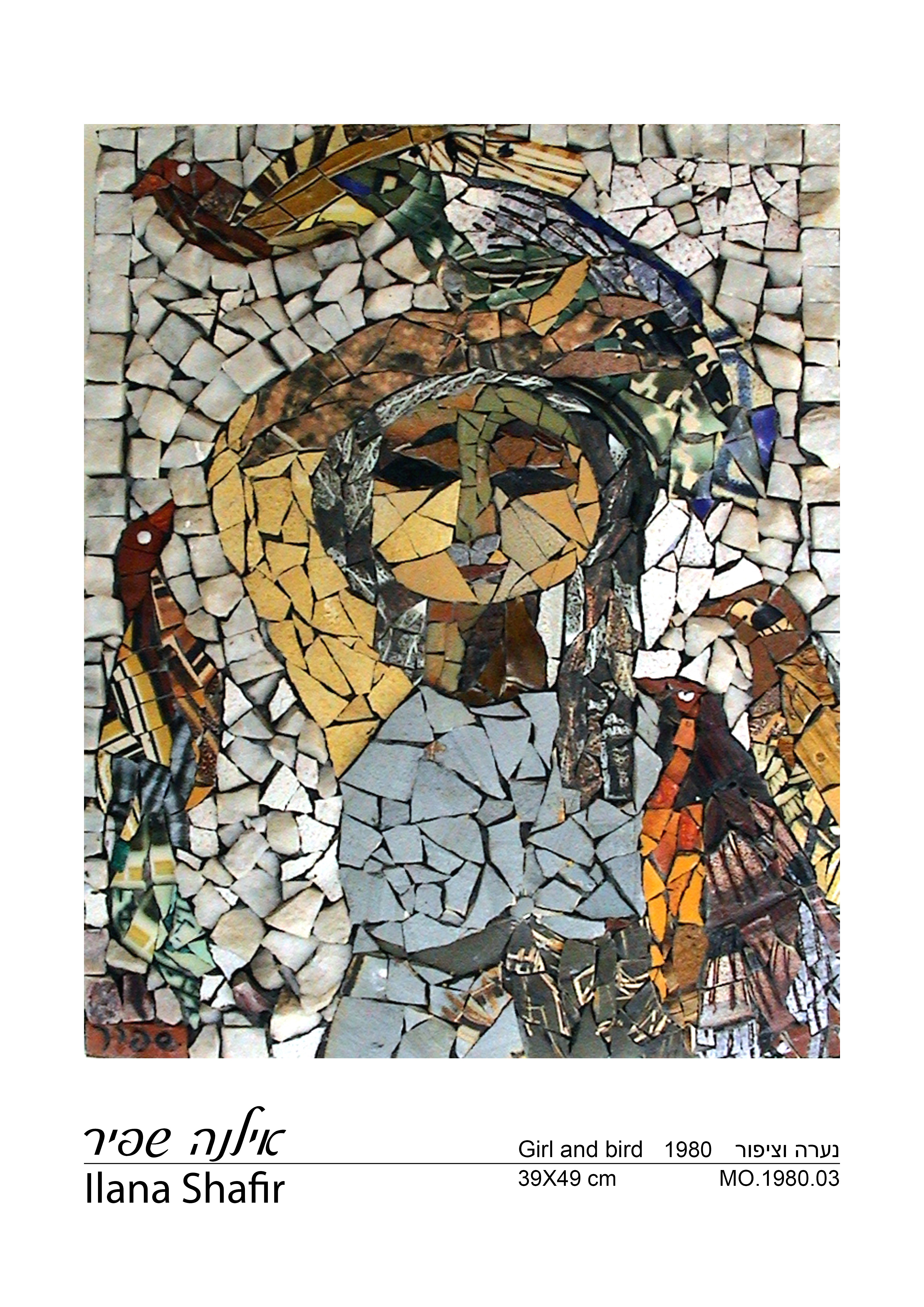

Ilana Shafir (Hebrew: אילנה שפיר; 21 March 1924 – 12 April 2014) was an Israeli mosaic artist, globally known for her unique style spontaneous mosaic, a technique in which the artistic work emerges without prior painting unlike the traditional mosaic work. Since the 1960s, she fashioned “extraordinary works mixing figurative and abstract motifs” in her studio in Ashkelon.

== Biography ==
Ilana Shafir was born on 21 March 1924 in the city of Sarajevo, Yugoslavia, now the capital of Bosnia and Herzegovina. Since her childhood, she showed interest in paintings. During the World War II, her family managed to escape to a small town called Kula, where they found protection. While in hiding, Shafir drew landscapes and portraits of the people around using old book covers for canvases which helped her to survive.

After the war, Shafir continued her studies at the Academy of Fine Arts, University of Zagreb, Croatia. In 1949, at the age of 25, she ultimately arrived to Ashkelon, the coastal town of Israel, where she settled for the rest of her life.

In the beginning, she experimented with different techniques but finally focused on mosaic art. She created mosaic murals in public buildings in Israel. She founded Ashkelon art centre which she directed from 1970 to 1985. From 1985 she produced numerous works for the Ashkelon mosaic garden.

Her works were exhibited in Israel, Italy, and Japan, and won numerous international awards. The society of American mosaic artists (SAMA) honoured her with lifetime achievement award. In 2011 she was also honoured with the only solo exhibition organized during the biennale Ravenna Mosaico.

She was the member of International association of contemporary mosaicists.

She died on 12 April 2014 in Ashkelon, Israel.
