= Sharon Rotbard =

Israeli architect, publisher and author

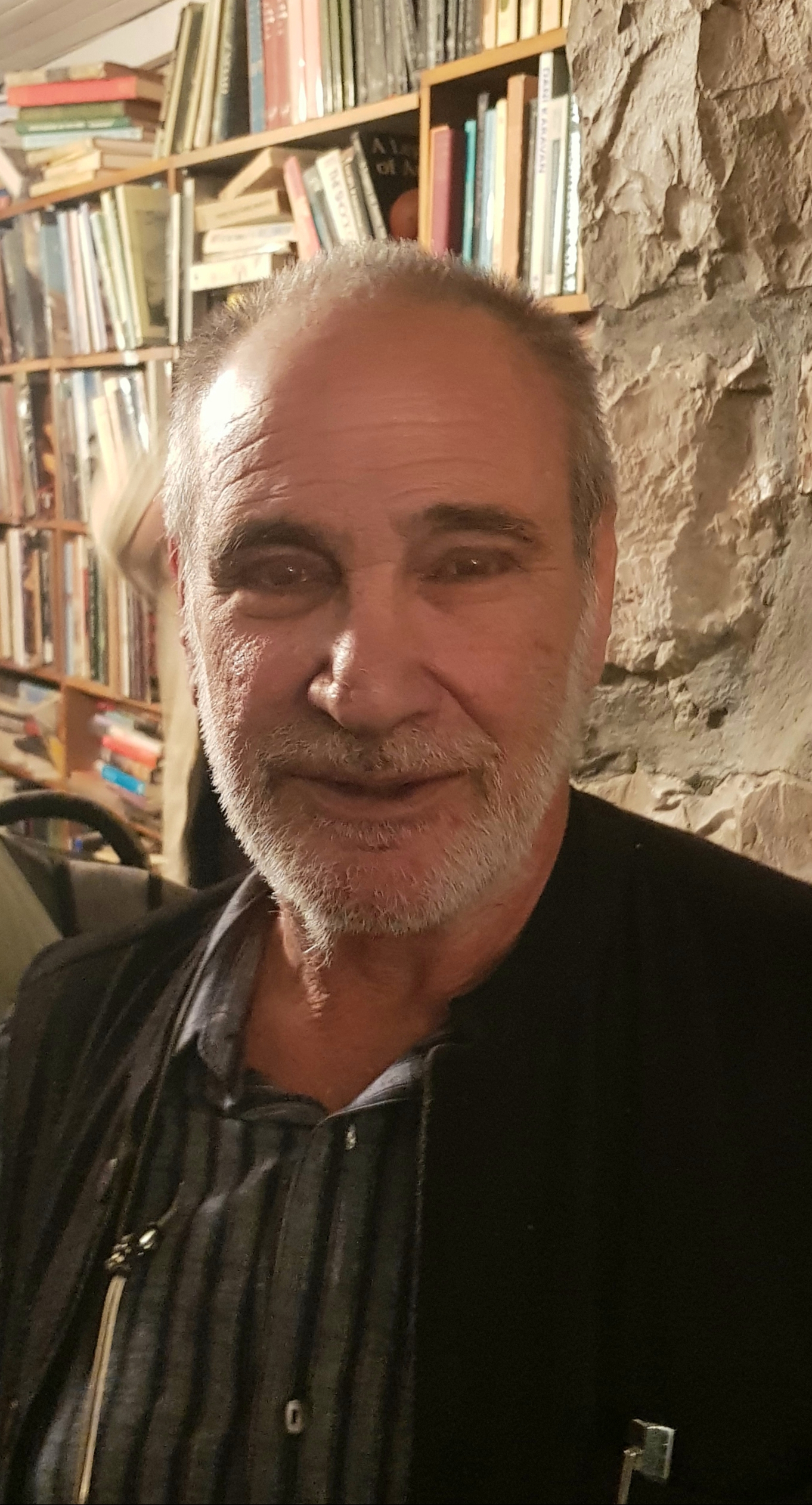
Image of Sharon Rotbard

Sharon Rotbard (Hebrew: שרון רוטברד; born October 2, 1959), is an Israeli architect, publisher and author, senior lecturer at the Architecture department in the Bezalel Academy, Jerusalem.

== Biography ==
Sharon Rotbard was born in Tel Aviv. He studied fine arts between 1982 and 1984 at HaMidrasha Art College with Raffi Lavie, Tamar Getter and Michal Na'aman. Between 1985 and 1991 he studied architecture in Paris at the École Spéciale d'Architecture with Bernard Tschumi, Jean Nouvel and Paul Virilio.

== Architecture and publishing career ==
After returning to Israel in 1993, Rotbard worked until 1997 as a project architect at Yasky and partners, a leading Israeli architectural firm.

In 1995, with his wife Amit, he founded Babel publishers, one of Israel's first independent presses. Since 1998, he has directed the first architecture book series in Israel at Babel and published major architectural classic titles such as Le Corbusier's Toward A New Architecture.

In 2000 Rotbard launched the press' website, Israel's first cultural Hebrew website, known today as readingmachine. That same year, Rotbard and Babel moved to a concrete house he designed and built in Shapira neighborhood at the south of Tel Aviv.

Since 2004 Rotbard has been directing The Library of Babel, the fiction series of Babel, in which he has published translated titles by Georges Perec, Nadine Gordimer, Michel Houellebecq, Marie Ndiaye, Thomas Bernhard, R.K. Narayan, Atiq Rahimi, Marek van der Jagt, Harry Mathews, as well as young Israeli authors.

In 2008, Rotbard founded a new architectural practice collective, Babel architectures, which was selected as one of the teams of the Ordos 100 project in Inner Mongolia (China).

== Published works ==
- Rotbard, Sharon; Dov Hanin; Michael Sfard (2004). The Refuseniks' Trials - The military Prosecutor against Hagay Matar, Matan Kaminer, Shimri Zameret, Adam Maor, Noam Bahat; The Military Prosecutor against Yoni Ben Artzi (in Hebrew). Babel (IL). p. 368. ISBN 965-512-070-8.
- Rotbard, Sharon (2005). White City, Black City: architecture and war in Tel Aviv and Jaffa (in Hebrew). Babel (IL). p. 352. ISBN 965-512-095-3.
- Rotbard, Sharon (2007). Avraham Yasky, Concrete Architecture (in Hebrew). Babel (IL). p. 996. ISBN 978-965-512-135-3.
- Rotbard, Sharon; Muki Tsur (2009). Neither In Jaffa, Nor in Tel Aviv: Stories, Testimonies and Documents from Shapira Neighborhood (in Hebrew). Babel (IL). p. 423. ISBN 978-965-512-175-9.
- Sharon Rotbard Presents: Students' projects 1985-2010 (in Hebrew). Bezalel Academy, Jerusalem (IL). 2010. p. 98.
- Rotbard, Sharon (2015). White City, Black City: architecture and war in Tel Aviv and Jaffa. Pluto Press (London). p. 256. ISBN 9780745335117.

Rotbard's first book White City, Black City (Hebrew עיר לבנה, עיר שחורה), on Jaffa and Tel Aviv's histories appeared in 2005. The book challenges the official historiography of Tel Aviv and traces its relationship with Jaffa.

His second book Avraham Yasky, Concrete Architecture a monograph on the work of Avraham Yasky, was published in 2007. The book traces the history of Israeli architecture through Yasky's career and shows its development from the concrete social architecture of the early Fifties to the commercial architecture of the 21st century.

== Awards and recognition ==
Rotbard is a recipient of the Graham Foundation 2008 grant and was selected to the Ledig House international writers' Residency program.

== Selected projects ==
- 1991, Europan2, cited project
- 1994, Ramat gan Museum of Israeli Art, with Efrat-Kovalsky (unbuilt)
- 1997, Rubinstin Towers, with Avraham Yasky and Yossy Sivan
- 2000, town houses in South Tel Aviv
- 2003, Tel Aviv Museum of Art competition
- 2005, Hadera Democratic school competition (2nd prize)
- 2009, ORDOS 100 Villa
- 2010, South Tel Aviv urban strategic plan, in association with local residents and planners

== See also ==
- Architecture of Israel
