= Arie Aroch =

Israeli painter and diplomat (1908-1974)

Arie Aroch אריה ארוך
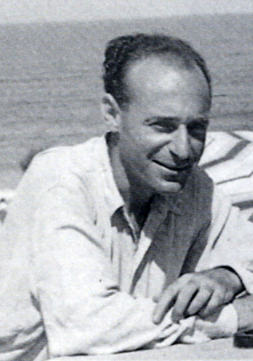
- Photograph of Arie Aroch
- Born: 1908; Kharkiv, Russian Empire
- Died: 1974 (aged 65–66); Jerusalem
- Education: Bezalel Academy of Arts and Design Yitzhak Frenkel's Histadrut studio
- Known for: Painting
- Movement: Israeli art

Arie Aroch (Hebrew: אריה ארוך; born 1908, in Russia – October 15, 1974, in Israel) was an Israeli painter and diplomat born in Kharkiv, now Ukraine and then part of the Russian Empire. Aroch's work was a mixture of Pop Art and abstract art, along with elements from his biography. In addition, many scholars of Israeli art history have pointed out Aroch's pioneering use of Jewish themes in his works. His painting style included unstructured scribbling and drawing, and it influenced a broad range of artists, including Raffi Lavie, Aviva Uri, etc. Sarah Breitberg Semel, in her article, Agrippa versus Nimrod (1988), suggested Aroch as a model for the new Israeli concept of design in art, and suggested his painting, Agrippas Street was the representative of Jewish identity. In 1971, Aroch was awarded the Israel Prize in Painting for his work.

== Biography ==
=== Youth ===
Arie Aroch was born in November 1908 in Kharkiv, which was then part of the Russian Empire and today is part of Ukraine. His name was Lyova Nisselvich, the youngest of the three children of Rivka-Shulamit and Haim Nisselvich. At the time of his birth, Kharkiv was outside the Jewish Pale of Settlement of the Russian Empire.

His father was a wealthy merchant active in Zionist political circles in Tzarist Russia. Among other things, his father was one of the founders of the “Tarbut” Gymnasium in Russia. At home he received a secular education that included music lessons and exposure to literature and poetry. During his childhood, he drew all the time. In an interview years later he said that by age 6 he was making charcoal drawings of whoever was in the house. In addition Nisselvich was exposed to art exhibitions in Kharkiv. Among the exhibitions that he is known to have seen is an exhibition of Emmanuel Mane-Katz.

=== In Palestine, 1924-1934 ===
In 1924, Nisselvich made aliyah to Palestine with his parents and his sister, while his older brother remained in the Soviet Union. During 1925 and 1926 he studied art at “Bezalel.” Among his classmates were Avigdor Stematsky, Moshe Castel, Sionah Tagger, Yehezkel Streichman, etc. His teachers included the painter Shmuel Ben David, the enamel artist Aaron Shaul Schur, and Jacob Eisenberg, in whose workshops he made ornamental ceramic tiles, for signs, among other things. In addition, a friendship developed between him and the artist Chaim Gliksberg, who taught him the art of painting with oil paints. He later studied under Yitzhak Frenkel at the Histadrut art studio.

In 1926 he studied in the science track at Gymnasia Herzlia in Tel Aviv. There the nickname “Aroch” (long) was born and stuck to him because of his height. This nickname was eventually adopted by Nisselvich as his family name. In 1929–1930, Aroch spent a year and a half at the Technion studying architecture. In 1932 he studied for a short time in the painting studio that Joseph Zaritsky had opened. In addition, he was accepted into the Israeli Painters and Sculptors Association, in the framework of which he exhibited in the association's general exhibition.

On the death of his father in 1932, Aroch erected a tombstone in the Trumpeldor Cemetery and engraved on it a poem by David Shimoni, his teacher at Gymnasia Herzlia. In 1934, his mother died also.

=== Paris - Palestine – Amsterdam, 1934-1939 ===
In 1934 Aroch went to Paris and studied there in the Académie Colarossi. Among other things Aroch participated in a number of lessons given by the cubist painter Fernand Léger. In the painting “Interior with Chair” (1935), which Aroch painted during his stay in Paris, the interior of a blue room is depicted in quick strokes of the paintbrush, with a red chair in the center of the room upon which various items of clothing are spread. The style of this painting, which is typical of Aroch during this period, typifies the subdued expressionism that Aroch adopted under the influence of artists of the “Paris School,” such as Chaïm Soutine, Marc Chagall, Isaac Frenkel and Mané-Katz. In the 1930s painting “Portrait”, Aroch also uses expressionistic brush strokes to create this melancholy portrait. Unlike those of other painters, Aroch's paintings don't exceed the boundaries of artistic representation, and his expressive brushstrokes don't turn into a description with abstract underpinnings.

Upon his return to mandatory Palestine in 1936, Aroch earned his living as a land surveyor. He married Ellen Albeck (Elroy), whom he met on the boat on the way back from Paris. This marriage lasted only a short time. With regard to his art, Aroch continued to paint under the influence of the Paris School. He participated in a group exhibition in the Tel Aviv Museum of Art, and he designed the set for “The White Circle” (1936), a Japanese legend directed by Friedrich Lobe at the “Ohel” Theatre, and for the play, “HaShomrin,” by Ever-Hadani at Habima Theatre.

Aroch spent the years 1938–1939 in Amsterdam. The influence of Vincent van Gogh can be seen in “Vase of Flowers and Still Life” (1938), in which the energetic brushstrokes and the theme typical of Van Gogh stand out. In his work “Through a Window” (1938), for example, Aroch depicts a Dutch urban landscape viewed through a window. In this work, and in others from this period, Aroch used the emphasis on the horizontal and vertical lines of the painting to divide the composition in a nearly geometrical and flat manner. On January 21, 1939, a solo exhibition by Aroch opened in the “Santa Landwer” Gallery in Amsterdam. The exhibition was covered in the local press, and the Parisian influence on Aroch was mentioned.

=== Tel Aviv, 1939-1948 ===
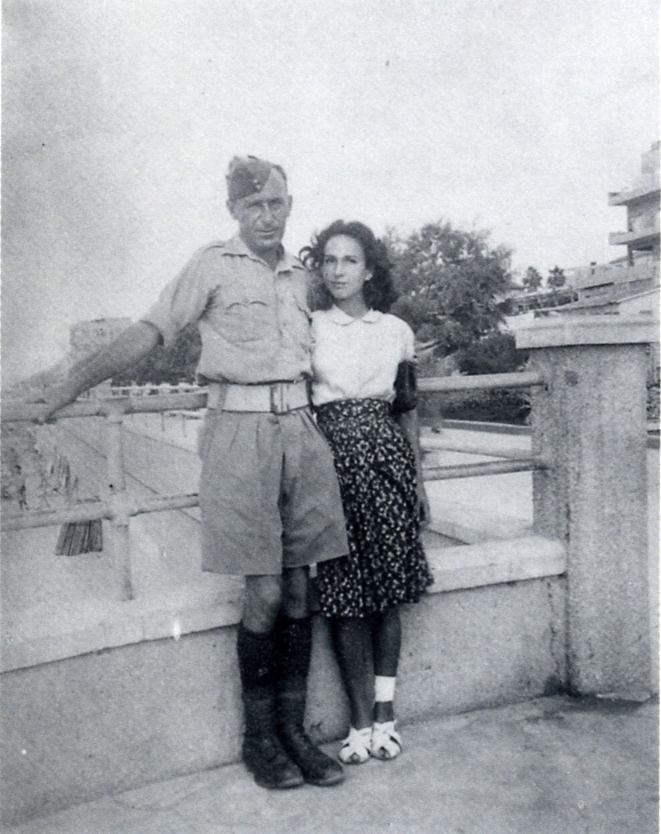
Arie and Dvora Aroch, Tel Aviv, 1943

In 1939 he returned to Tel Aviv, where he mounted a solo exhibition at the Katz Gallery of many of the works he had produced in Amsterdam. His works from the 1940s continued in the style he had crystallized in the Netherlands, based on composition that is dominated by clear geometric division. During these years Aroch painted many landscapes. At the beginning of the decade Aroch painted a series of scenes of Zichron Yaakov and Haifa, in which he lived off and on from 1942 to 1946, while he served in the British army. In addition, he designed uniforms for the first Lahakat Tsahal (the national Military Band of what was then the Land of Israel), which gave its first programs in 1942 and 1943.

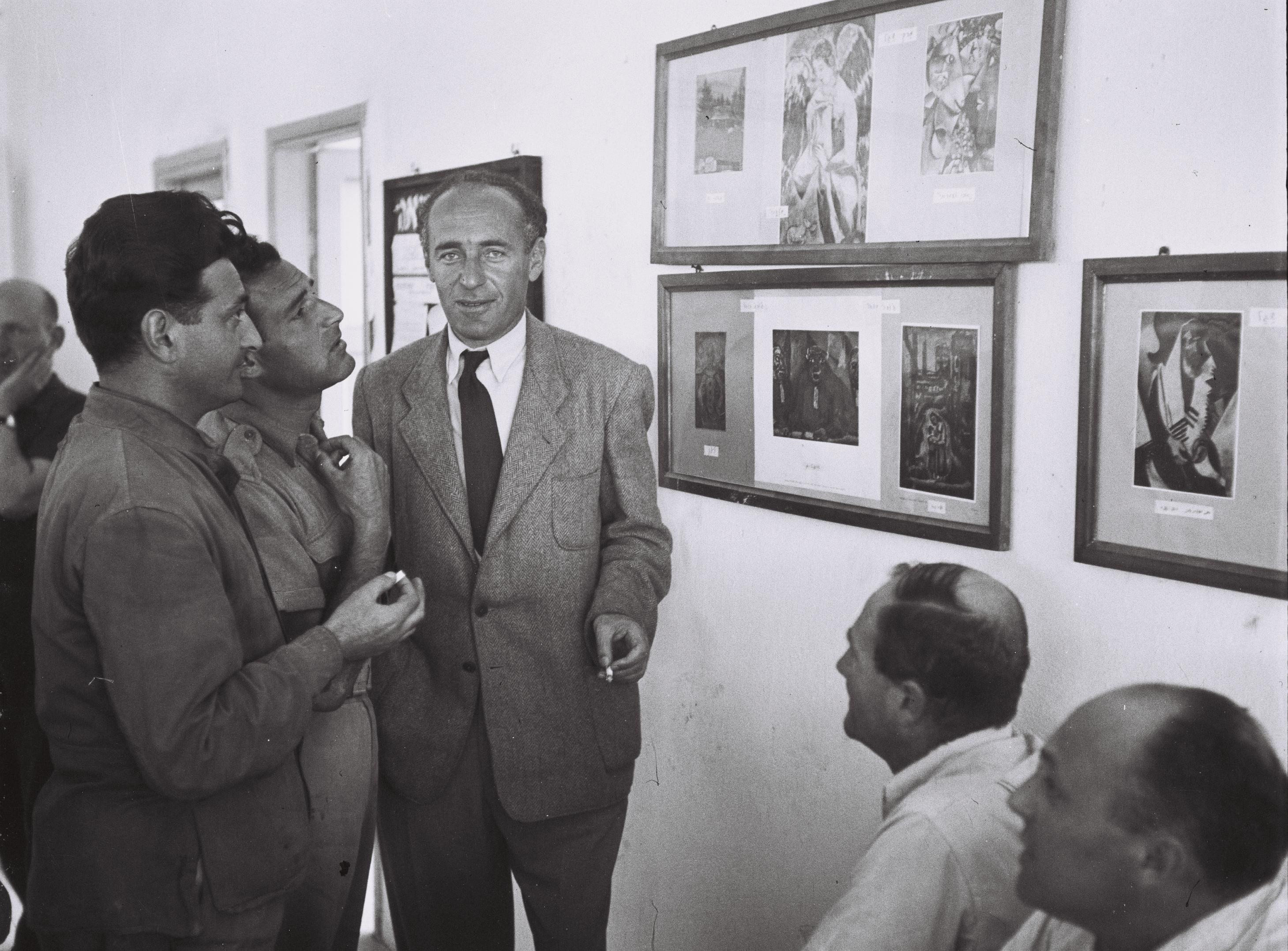
Arieh Aroh lecturing on the history of art to factory workers, 1946

During the entire first half of the decade he presented his work in group exhibitions held in the “Habima” building. When he participated in the “Exhibition of the Eight” that was held in December 1942 in the “Habima” building, Haim Gamzu remarked on his use of color, influenced by Van Gogh, and was awarded the Meir Dizengoff Prize for a Young Artist by the Tel Aviv municipality. In 1943 he married Dvora Koenig. After Aroch's release from the army in 1946, the couple moved to 120 Hayarkon Street in Tel Aviv, where he opened a studio in the small yard attached to their house.

In 1947 Aroch participated in the Exhibition of “The Seven” at the Tel Aviv Museum of Art. At this exhibition ten works of his were shown, including “Men on the Promenade” (1943) and paintings of other scenes. Eugene Kolb published a flattering critical article on Aroch's work, and described his transition from Post-Impressionism to an emphasis on “constructed forms” and “simplicity of color.” His works from the middle of the decade show a tendency toward schematism and the deconstruction of the scene into geometric parts in the style of the Cubists. This phenomenon can be seen also in earlier works, such as “The Red Bus” (1944–1946), from his series “Bus in the Mountains.”

=== New and Old Horizons, 1959-1966 ===
From 1956 to 1959, Arie Aroch served as the Israeli ambassador to Brazil. Concurrently, he served as Ambassador to Venezuela (1957 - 1958). During these years he didn't paint much. In 1959 Aroch was named the Israeli ambassador to Sweden. His stay in Sweden released a great burst of creative energy in him. Between 1960 and 1962 he began to produce his most significant body of work, which differed from the style of Israeli painting of the other members of “New Horizons” in everything connected to the inclusion of extra-artistic symbolic images.

One of the things that motivated this burst of creativity was Aroch's exposure to exhibitions of the contemporary art of that period that were held in the Stockholm City Museum during those years. Among others, in 1962 Aroch attended an exhibition of the works of “Pop Art” artists, including Robert Rauschenberg and Jasper Johns. The use by American artists of “modified” Ready-made objects as part of their artistic works, and the abstract styles known as “Tachisme” and the French “Informel,” combined in Aroch's work in a delicate style that became known as “concrete abstraction.” For Aroch and his interpreters the meaning of this style was a combination of figurative images that had a symbolic meaning for the artist, and design as abstraction in order to create a new, independent form.

Among his well-known works of this period is a series of paintings known as “Tzakpar” that Aroch began painting in 1961. These works are based on an image from a shoemaker's sign from Aroch's memory, an image of a boot, which Aroch recalled from his childhood. Aroch created variations of this image, arriving in the end at a sort of abstract form placed within an oval frame. In a later interview, Aroch explained the development of this image as the basis for “concrete abstraction”: “The image that developed from the boot looked like a concrete image (as opposed to an abstract one), whose right of existence is the right of existence I wanted to embody in an abstract object, in an object that corresponded to a definition I had created previously.”

In 1963 Aroch returned from Sweden and settled in Jerusalem. He established a professional contact with Bertha Urdang, director of the Rina Gallery, Jerusalem, who mounted an exhibition of his works during this year. In addition, he was appointed the director of cultural affairs in the Foreign Ministry, where he remained until his retirement in 1971. While participating in a meeting in Rome, as part of his job with the Foreign Ministry, he acquired the concept of using "Panda" oil pastel chalk, and started to work on a large body of work using this technique, some of them on reproductions and magazine pages (Gideon Efrat states that it was Aroch who introduced the term “Panda” into Hebrew as the generic term for this kind of pastel chalk). In 1964 Aroch exhibited 34 of his paintings in the Israeli exhibition at the Biennale in Venice, some of them drawn using the technique of “Panda” colors. In 1966 Masada Gallery in Tel Aviv held an exhibition of 23 of his Panda color drawings, organized by Raffi Lavie.

Another series of works that Aroch worked on during the 1960s was based on a depiction of the Creation, a depiction of the Exodus from Egypt, and a depiction of Moses with the Ten Commandments as they appear in the 14th-century Sarajevo Haggadah. These works, such as the “Jewish Motif” (1961), “Arch in Blue-Purple” (1961), or “The Creation, Sarajevo Haggadah” (1966), exhibit abstract symbols of metaphysical significance. In these works, Gideon Efrat asserts, Aroch combined “Israeli lyrical abstraction, which Zaritsky and his colleagues had exported from Paris, with the memory of the Jewish people, a combination of New Horizons and Old Horizons.” and Judaism with Universalism.

In his works "The High Commissioner" (1966) and "Agripas Street" (1964), Aroch created his most typical combination of “concrete” local perceptions and international “Pop Art”. In "Agripas Street," the most widely analyzed of all Aroch's works, Aroch combined symbols from the period he spent at Bezalel in Jerusalem that emphasized his interest in the religious and secular symbolism of authority and government. In "The High Commissioner,” which continues his interest in these symbols, Aroch used additional iconographic elements, based on the history of Western art, which were destined to show up in his later works as well. Among these elements, the combination of the colors red and blue and the duplication of images stand out.

=== Last Years, 1967-1974 ===
Between 1967 and 1970, Aroch participated in a number of group exhibitions. In 1968 Yona Fischer curated an exhibition of 48 of Aroch's work in The Israel Museum. In addition the museum awarded him the Sandberg Prize. In 1970, Aroch underwent an operation for the removal of a tumor. In 1971, Aroch was awarded the Israel Prize in Painting.

In his last year, Aroch included many ars poetica elements in his work. As part of this approach, Aroch included in his work many variations on characters taken from literature. Examples include his painting “Two Cubes” (1968) and his series of paintings of rowboats from 1968 to 1970, in which details from the textbook of Christian Ludolph Reinhold are cited, “In the Style of Derain’s ‘Ball of soldiers in Suresnes’” (1967), based on the work by André Derain. etc. Another ars poetica motif is the profile of Adam.

During the last years of his life Aroch planned two monumental projects: a wall hanging for the soldier's home in Afeka and a wall relief made of sawed-off pipes for the Hebrew University Library. However his serious illness prevented him from finishing these projects. He died on October 15, 1974.

== Works ==
For years Arie Aroch's work was perceived as being on the periphery of Israeli abstract art. As with many of the artists of the “New Horizons” group, his early works were influenced by the post impressionism and the expressionism of the School of Paris (Ecole de Paris). Even though in his works the images went through a process of formal reduction, that is, abstraction, the formula that Joseph Zaritsky crystallized in “New Horizons” was very far from Aroch's interest in the significance of the images. Aroch invested his time in many interviews in order to emphasize his interest in formalism, in its forms and in its way of constructing a painting. However, many of the abstract forms and images were the result of the process of “concrete abstraction,” in which the forms preserved, for Aroch, their symbolic significance.

The painting technique which Aroch created, which included doodling, engraving, and “scribbling,” alongside of rational abstract painting, influenced a number of painters identified with the “Want of Matter” movement, most notably Raffi Lavie, who was viewed, along with Aviva Uri, as paving the way for new Israeli painting.

Beginning in the 1980s, a new interpretation of Aroch's works began to surface. Instead of emphasizing the formalistic aspect, art critics began to focus on the contents of Aroch's works, including the elements from Jewish tradition. Aroch was perceived as having made the connection between local Israeli Judaism and universalism. In her article “Agrippa versus Nimrod” (1988), Sarah Breitberg-Semel presented Aroch's work as a model for the design of a new Israeli concept. In her article she attacked the canonical concept in the research literature on the history of Israeli art, with regard to “Nimrod” (1939) by Itzhak Danziger, that saw in it the exclusive representative of Jewish nationalism. “Agripas Street” was put forward by her as a more worthy alternative as a work that combines “Jewish” values with Zionist values.

Arie Aroch, in spite of the fact that he was a member of “New Horizons,” offered in his works an alternative to “lyrical abstraction.” Instead of formless abstraction, he suggested concentrating on forms; instead of objectivity, basing the creation on personal handwriting; instead of professionalism, impoverishment of process – using non-traditional techniques to give birth to forms; instead of identifying with French abstract art – citing and using images that belong to various artistic concepts. Thus were born in his works forms from children's paintings, the use of commonplace objects, folk or traditional images or images connected to childhood memories. Arie Aroch influenced young artists more by his thoughts, by his way of combining different images with each other in his paintings, by the apparently meaningless lack of pathos that characterizes his work, by his techniques (erasures, engravings, doodles). Aviva Uri, and after her Raffi Lavie, can be counted among those artists.

== Education ==
- 1924-26 Bezalel Academy of Arts and Design, Jerusalem
- 1926-28 Herzliya Hebrew Gymnasium, Tel Aviv
- 1934-35 Colarossi, Paris, with Leger

== Awards and prizes ==
- 1942: the Dizengoff Prize for Painting and Sculpture, Municipality of Tel Aviv-Yafo, Tel Aviv
- 1955: Tel Aviv Museum's Dizengoff Prize
- 1968: the Sandberg Prize for Israel Art, Israel Museum, Jerusalem
- 1971: the Israel Prize for Painting
