= Michal Na'aman =

Israeli artist

Michal Na'aman מיכל נעמן
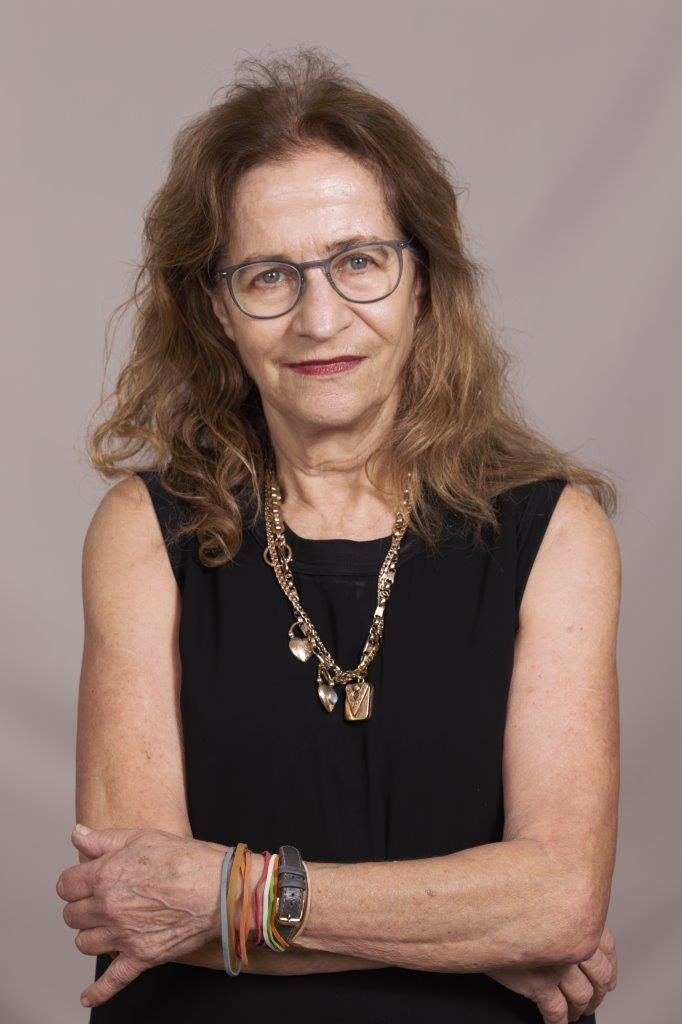
- Na'aman in 2019
- Born: November 19, 1951 (age 74); Kvutzat Kinneret, Northern District, Israel
- Known for: Conceptual art painter
- Movement: Israeli art

Michal Na'aman (Hebrew: מיכל נעמן; 19 November 1951), is an Israeli painter. From the point of view of values, her work is characterized as conceptual art and deals with such subjects as the limitations of language and sight, the possibilities for expression, and gender issues. Using the techniques of collage, Na'aman has created works that examine the visual way of thinking as opposed to the verbal way of thinking. In 2014, she was awarded the Israel Prize for Plastic Arts for her work.

== Biography ==
Michal Na'aman was born in 1951, the youngest of the four children of the historian Shlomo Na'aman and Leah Kupernik. Her older brother is a noted Israeli archaeologist Nadav Na'aman.

She grew up on Kibbutz Kvutzat Kinneret, where her father was a teacher in the regional high school and her mother in the joint school. In an interview many years later Na'aman noted that her parents' "non-pioneer" careers drew an unenthusiastic response from the kibbutz members. "My family was a little like lepers there," Na'aman testified, "and the fact is they were thrown out." In 1964 she left with her parents to the town of Lod. While she was studying in high school, she also studied at the "Margoshilsky" High School for Art, Tel Aviv. After that she studied art privately with George Shemesh.

In 1969, Na'aman began studying at the Hamidrasha Art Teachers' Training College, which at that time was next to the Beit Histadrut Ha-Morim (Teachers' Union House) At Hamidrasha she studied art with Ran Shechori, Dov Feigin, and Raffi Lavie. Lavie's artistic language, which included scribbling and the use collage, and styles such as "Want of Matter", was adopted by Na'aman and by other students of Lavie. However, what distinguished Na'aman's work from Lavie's was that in her works there were textual images, cutting her work off from the separation of "form" and "content" that Lavie insisted on in his work.

In 1972, Na'aman completed her studies in the History of Art and Literature at Tel Aviv University. In this same year she exhibited some of her works in a group exhibition at "Gallery 201" in Tel Aviv.

In 1974, Na'aman exhibited her works in the exhibition "Five Young Artists" in the Kibbutz Art Gallery in Tel Aviv. The other artists who exhibited along with Na'aman were Tamar Getter, David Ginton, Nahum Tevet, and Efrat Natan, who knew each other through their connection to Raffi Lavie. On her work "A Kid in Its Mother's Milk" (1974), which was shown in this exhibition, Na'aman wrote a text that transferred "the religious, Talmudic law to a national, secular reality" in both a private and a national context. The Biblical text "A Kid in Its Mother's Milk" appears on a piece of exercise book paper next to the text "A Country That Eats its Young", as well as in pink letters on the wall of the gallery. The work was heavily criticized during the exhibition. Yehoshua Kenaz, for example, the editor of the Culture Supplement of the newspaper Haaretz at the time, described the work as "trickery".

Another work shown in the exhibition was the photograph "Daughter of Israel" (1974) – photographic documentation of an "activity" in which Na'aman wrote a text taken from Ultraorthodox warning notices about modesty, on a piece of paper attached to her arm as a sort of splint. Na'aman's use, in a critical way, of Jewish traditions in her work was characteristic of other works she created during the 1970s.

=== Airy nuns and other species ===
In the middle of the 1970s, Na'aman began to use collage and photography as a central part of her work. The use of photography as a central part of the raw material of her collages enabled Na'aman, for the first time, to introduce clear visual images of sexuality and sexual perfection, alongside a preoccupation with her real and fake identity. In her series of works entitled "Blue Retouch" (1974–1975), Na'aman made use of photographic images of Zalman Shoshi, Uri Zvi Greenberg, and of a female criminal whose eyes were gouged out. These images underwent a "retouch" using a blue pencil, that emphasized certain details in the photographs.

On December 23, 1975, Na'aman's first solo exhibition opened in the Yodfat Gallery in Tel Aviv. It was the last exhibition mounted in this gallery before it closed. In the review in the newspaper Al HaMishmar, Chana Bar-Or wrote about the works in Na'aman's exhibition that they represent "one long, difficult system of 'conceptualism' trying to break out of the concept".

In "Vanya (Vajezath)" (1975), a collage exhibited in the exhibition, Na'aman uses a photograph of the legs of a woman with her underpants pulled down juxtaposed to a photograph of a ceiling fan. Sarah Breitberg Semel described the work retrospectively as a "strip show" by a woman whose body can't be seen. "All the viewer gets to see," Breitberg Semel remarked, "is a little piece of her skirt, that is, a little more black. Nothing else is on view. The fan, on the other hand, is photographed turning so fast you can see the hole in the middle of the blades. A kind of reversal is created between the male element (the fan) and the female element, with head and legs exchanged between them.

Another work that used a photo of a fan is "Killed a Penguin/A Nun Was Killed" (1975). This work combined an interest in sexuality and popular culture, expressed through a chauvinist joke, with an interest in semiotics and the grammatical exchange between the passive and active voice. The fan, as Na'aman described it, "turns and, as it does, mixes white with black, life with death, penguin with nun".

This mixing of different species can be seen also in other works, such as "Lord of Colors" (1976), in which Na'aman created a divergent and mistaken spelling of the name of God, or the series "Fish Bird", the beginning of which dates from 1977. These works had at their center a hybrid creature composed of photographs of a fish and a bird, taken from an encyclopedia of nature. The images were accompanied by texts such as "The Gospel According to the Bird" or "The Fish is the Joke of the Bird", which take their inspiration from Christianity along with a discussion of the questions of "Ars Poetica".

=== New York, 1978–1980 ===
From 1978 to 1980, Na'aman lived in New York, where she studied in the School of Visual Arts, with the help of a grant she received from the America Israel Cultural Foundation. During this period the "rabbit-duck", which has been a central ethnographic symbol in her work ever since, first appeared.

The source of this image was the "Jastrow illusion," which raises the question of the identity of a visual image which was named for the American Jewish psychologist Joseph Jastrow. Na'aman borrowed the image from the book Philosophical Investigations (Philosophische Untersuchungen) by the philosopher Ludwig Wittgenstein (1953). In her works from this period Na'aman returned to painting techniques that included the use of stencils and the dribbling on of color. The paintings, which were dominated by shades of red and black, were composed of strips of newspaper, arranged along vertical and horizontal axles, like a kind of cross. On the cross images of the "rabbit-duck' appeared, alongside of text fragments and sentences in English connected to the concept of identity". The works, Na'aman declared, were concerned with "the increase in genetic reproduction" in family images, and in the reciprocity of looks exchanged between you and the world. In 1980 Na'aman mounted an exhibition of these works in the Gallery of Bertha Urdang in New York.

=== "The Eyes in the Field", 1981–1989 ===
In November 1981 Na'aman exhibited her work in the group exhibition "Another Spirit" in the Tel Aviv Museum of Art. One of the paintings she exhibited, "Woman Gazing at a Turtle" (1981), showed schematic human forms performing various physical activities. The more "picturesque" aspect of this and other works from this period constituted an innovation in Na'aman's work. This was expressed in a reduced use of text, in a cessation of the use of photographs, in a more varied use of color, in the use of larger canvases, in the use of visual images taken from Western art (e.g., images from the paintings of Francisco Goya) in her works. The curator of the exhibition, Sarah Breitberg-Semel, who was also the curator of Israeli art in the museum, frequently exhibited the works of Na'aman in the Tel Aviv Museum of Art and other venues during the 1980s.

In 1982, a solo exhibition of Na'aman's paintings opened at the Israeli Pavilion of the Venice Biennale. Along with Na'aman, Tamar Getter also exhibited her works. Na'aman exhibited large scale works featuring human figures alongside figures of apes, reminiscent of Darwin's The Origin of Species. In the center of the painting "Lloyd and Floyd: Siamese Twins" (1982), for example, Na'aman draws the family of man, which is being carried on the back of the father of the family in a kind of human pyramid. In front of them stand two parallel figures—an ape and a man – drawn in profile to the viewer.

Breitberg-Semel, curator of the exhibition, described the work of Na'aman in the catalog as featuring figures which were hybrid and grotesque. According to Breitberg-Semel, the painting of Na'aman makes use of a permanent set of figures that undergo graphic and color transformations which connect, complicate, and instigate conflict between one theory and another, one situation and another, one person and another, to the point that the composition seems to contain all the cracks pointing to its own pending destruction. The figures from "The Family of Man" that Na'aman displays in her works, and particularly the many figures of children in her works, are characterized by an absence of facial expression and look like dolls or stuffed figures.

A few days after the opening of the exhibition, just after the Lebanese War broke out, a bomb went off near the door of the Israeli Pavilion. The bomb caused a fire in Tamar Getter's exhibition and Na'aman's painting on plywood, "Blood Connection" (1982), was seriously damaged in the blast.

In 1983 Na'aman had a solo exhibition in the Tel Aviv Museum of Art. This exhibition marked the opening of "The Helena Rubinstein Pavilion for Contemporary Art" as a building dedicated to exhibiting Israeli art. The exhibition included a number of Na'aman's works from the 1970s, as well as paintings from the exhibition in Venice and some new paintings. Na'aman's paintings from these years received mixed reviews in the Israeli press. Sarit Shapira claimed, in spite of the increasing use of bodily symbols in Na'aman's works, that these paintings were subjugated to the Zionist intellectual system. Raffi Lavie cited the influence of Marcel Duchamp and Jasper Johns on Na'aman's work and spoke of the complex relationships between the different images in the works. At the same time, there were other critics who thought that making this intellectual connection served as an impediment to understanding her work. Talia Rapaport, for example, described the works as "concerned with the organic development of a strange, schematic style".

In 1986 a number of Na'aman's works were displayed in an exhibition entitled "The Want of Matter as a Quality in Israeli Art". One of the attention-getting works in the exhibition was the painting "The Eyes in the Field" (1983), which was first exhibited in 1984 in the Dvir Gallery in Tel Aviv. In the bottom part of the painting are schematic images of people and an image of a brain on a background of the blade of a shaving razor. In the top part of the painting are schematic images of human eyes, isolated from any human body, and placed on a decorative background.

Na'aman's preoccupation with seeing and with establishing identity, which showed up even in her early works, became a central theme in a series of her works from the second half of the 1980s. Iconographic motifs of peeking and exhibitionism appeared in many of her works. Various paintings displayed images of empty male garments, reminiscent of the work of DuChamp, especially of his painting "The Large Glass" (Le Grand Verre). In 1989 Na'aman had an exhibition of her works at the Julie M. Gallery in Tel Aviv. In 1989 a son, Yonatan, was born to Na'aman and her spouse Yossi Mar-Chaim.

=== The 1990s ===
During the 1990s Na'aman began to create paintings that made use of geometric structures. One of the series of works she painted made use of a woodcut that depicted a wolf taken from a description of dream of one of Freud's patients, known as the "Wolf Man". Sometimes the image from the woodcut was combined with geometric structures that resembled an abstract geometric painting, and particularly the paintings of Piet Mondrian. A different use of the woodcut image appears in a series of paintings and prints based on contrasts between visual and textual images. In the painting "'Trees of Light' and 'Golden Showers'" (1993), for example, Na'aman used the color yellow as a double symbol for both light and urine.

Another series was created using a labor-intensive work composed of colored squares that made up a colored surface. In works like "Throw out the Baby Along with the Bath" (1994), the squares form an image that resembles the blade of a razor. In addition, Na'aman added images of a rabbit and a duck, images which she had used in the past.

In February 1999, a large solo exhibition of Na'aman's works opened at the Tel Aviv Museum of Art under the title, "ha-Tzvaim". [Lord of Colors]. In English the exhibition was called "Legion", after a concept taken from the New Testament. According to Na'aman, "That's the name that the man possessed by a dybbuk calls himself." Along with new works, the exhibition included a number of her works from the 1970s. Most of the works in this exhibition included references to the concept of divinity. In the works that carry the name "Lord of Colors", Na'aman garbled the name of God, turning it into an Ars Poetica expression of the nature of the artistic image.

This series of works made use of the pattern of squares Na'aman used in her earlier works, but here Na'man left on the paintings the strips of masking tape she used to make the squares. "The works sometimes look monochromatic," Na'aman testified, "because of the single color brushed across the squares, which stains the masking tape and is left on it. The multicolored nature of the squares gives way to the single-colored nature of the paper screen, a sort of uniform dripping of the 'flood' of various colors, hiding the polychromatic rainbow of the squares."

=== The first decades of the twenty-first century and after ===
During the first decade of the twenty-first century this technique served as a framework for works that related both to history and to the personal history of the artist. On February 16, 2002, for example, an exhibition opened at Beit Gabriel in Tzemach, on the Sea of Galilee, called "Miracles on the Water", curated by Gideon Ofrat. The exhibition included works with an autobiographical element in them, expressed in images of the Sea of Galilee and in descriptions of the miracles of the New Testament related to it, such as the miracle of the pigs at Kursi (where pigs flew) or Jesus' Walking on Water. In addition, Na'aman created a new version of the installation"The Eyes of the Country" under the name "The Eye of the Country". The exhibition closed soon after its opening because of the events of the second Gulf War.

Another series of works was exhibited in a solo exhibition called "Witz" in 2013. Some of the works in the series, which was a continuation of the series of works Na'aman exhibited under the name "A Smile, A Cat, A Cut", (2010), dealt with the semantic significances of color, both as material and as an esthetic metaphor. "As a result of my interest in the names of colors," Na'aman writes, "I found a color called 'German Earth' (Deutsche Erde)." The surface of the work by this name that was shown in this exhibition was painted in monochromatic drips and splatters of the "German" color. The drips as the presence of the concrete randomness of liquid color and, at the same time, as the artistic expression of catastrophic events, "of injury".

In 2014, Na'aman won the Israel Prize in Art. In honor of her winning the prize a retrospective exhibition of her art called "Miki-Mouth" opened on November 25 at HaMidrasha Gallery in Tel Aviv.

== Education ==
- 1972 Graduate of Tel Aviv University, literature and history of art
- Art Teachers' Training College, Ramat Hasharon
- 1978–1980 School of Visual Arts, New York

== Teaching ==
- 1977–2004 Art Teachers' Training College, Ramat Hasharon
- 2005 – Beit Berl, the School of Art – Hamidrasha, professor

== Awards and prizes ==
- American-Israel Cultural Foundation, scholarship for School of Visual Arts, New York, 1978–1980
- Jacques and Genia O'Hana Prize for a Young Israeli Artist, Tel Aviv Museum, 1981
- George and Janette Geffin Prize, America Israel Culture Fund, 1995
- The Minister of the Arts and Science Prize
- Isracard Prize, Tel Aviv Museum, together with Lillian Klapisch, 1998
- Dizengoff Prize, 2002
- Sandberg Prize, Israel Museum, Jerusalem, 1998
- Sandberg Prize, Israel Museum, Jerusalem, 2002

== Solo exhibitions ==
- 1975 Vai Hi Oh, Yodfat Gallery, Tel Aviv.
- 1976 Backbiting, Julie M. Gallery, Tel Aviv.
- 1977 Fish Bird, Russ Gallery, Tel Aviv.
- 1978 Michal Na'aman, New Works, Russ Gallery, Tel Aviv.
- 1980 Ducks and Rabbits, Bertha Urdang Gallery, New York.
- 1981 Mabat Gallery, Tel Aviv.
- 1982 The Venice Biennale.
- 1983 Michael Na'aman 1975–1983, Tel Aviv Museum of Art.
- 1984 Dvir Gallery, Tel Aviv.
- 1985 Betzalel Academy of Art and Design, Jerusalem.
- 1987 Julie M. Gallery, Tel Aviv.
- 1989 Michal Na'aman, New Works, 1987–1989, Julie M. Gallery, Tel Aviv.
- 1991 Julie M. Gallery, Tel Aviv.
- 1998 Legion, Julie M. Gallery, Tel Aviv.
- 1999 Legion, Tel Aviv Museum of Art.
- 1999 Red and a Trickle of White, Julie M. Gallery, Tel Aviv.
- 2001 Yester-Red, Julie M. Gallery, Tel Aviv.
- 2006 Miracles on the Sea, Beit Gabriel, Jordan Valley.
- 2006 The eye of the Nation, Gordon Gallery, Tel Aviv.
- 2010 A Smile, A Cat, A Cut", Gordon Gallery, Tel Aviv (cat.).
- 2011 Fuck The Clock – Fresh Paint Fair – Gordon Gallery.
- 2013 Wit/ויץ/Wit, Gordon Gallery, Tel Aviv.

== Gallery ==
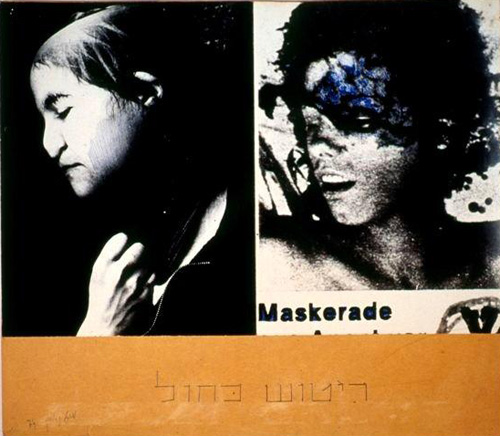
Blue Retouch, 1975
photographs and Letraset, and ballpoint pen on plywood

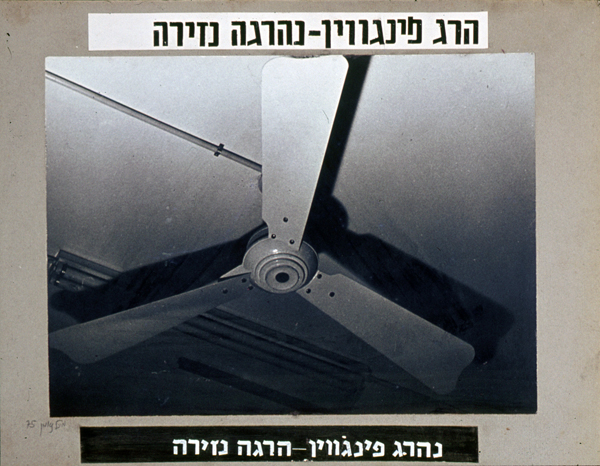
Killed a Penguin; A Nun was Killed, 1975
Photograph, paper and Letraset on cardboard
Tel Aviv Museum of Art

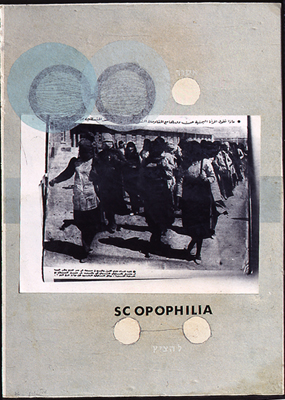
Scopophilia, 1976
Mixed media and collage on cardboard
The Israel Museum, Jerusalem

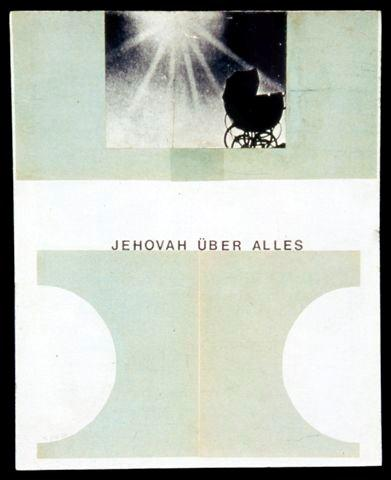
Jehovah Über Alles, 1976
collage and Letraset on wood

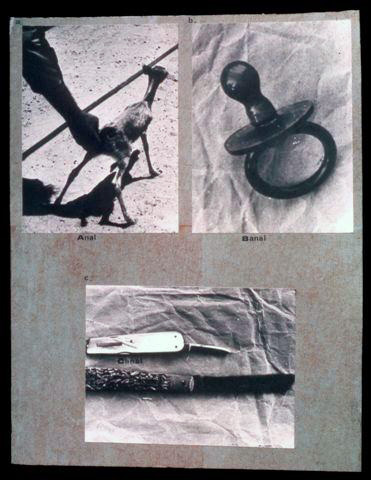
Anal, Banal, Canal, 1977
Photographs and Letraset on plywood
Tel Aviv Museum of Art

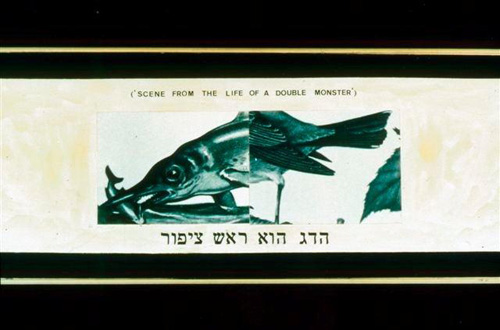
Scene from the Life of a Double Monster, 1977
Photographs, Letraset and industrtrial paint on plywood

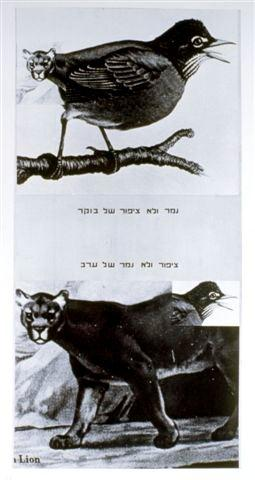
Tiger and not a morning bird, 1977
Collage and letterset on cardboard

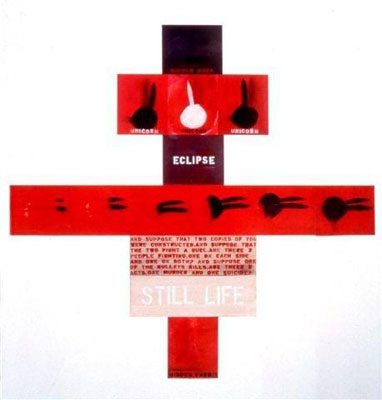
Eclipse, 1979-1980
industrial paint and spray paint on paper

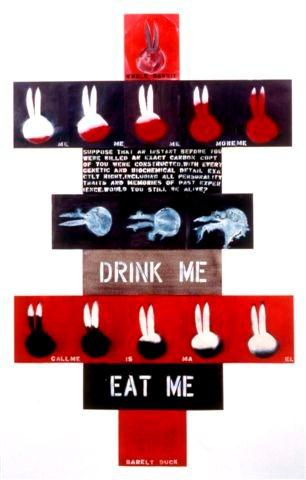
Call Me Is Ma El, 1980
industrial paint and spray paint on paper
Tel Aviv Museum of Art

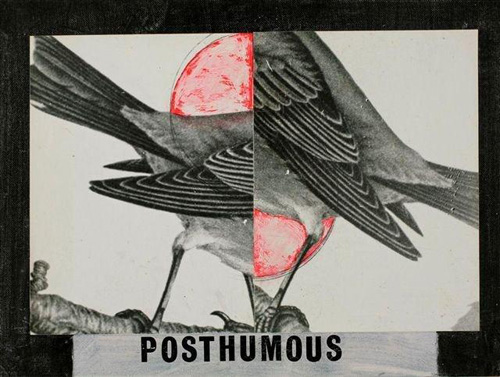
Posthumous, 1983
acrylic and collage on canvas on wood

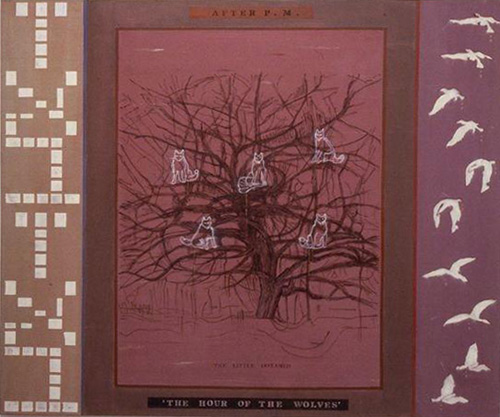
After P.M., 1989
Oil on canvas

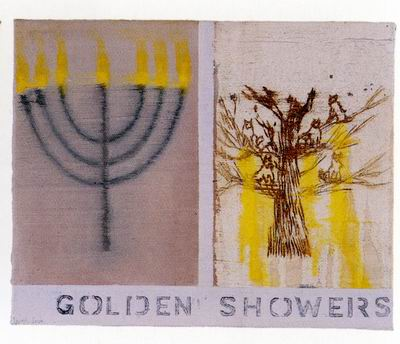
Golden Showers (diptych), 1993
Mixed media on canvas
Israel Museum, Jerusalem

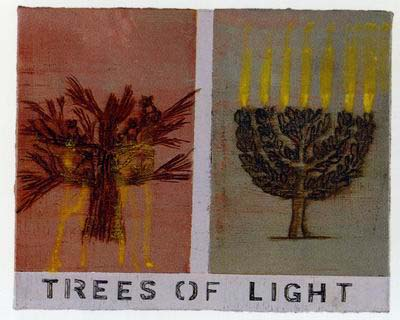
Trees of Light, 1993
Mixed media and collage on cardboard
Israel Museum, Jerusalem
