= Joseph Gattegno =

Israeli artist (1939–2016)

Joseph Gattegno יוסף גטניו
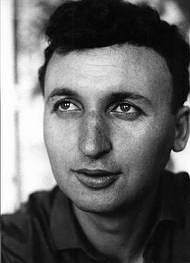
- Photograph of Joseph Gattegno
- Born: 1939; Bulgaria
- Died: 2016 (aged 76–77)
- Known for: Painting

Joseph Gattegno (Hebrew: יוסף גטניו; 1939-2016) (was an Israeli painter)

Born in Bulgaria, Joseph immigrated with his family to Israel in 1940 as a baby.

After his art studies, he was among the leaders of Israeli art group named 10+, which included Raffi Lavie and Moshe Givati. In 1963 he was sent by the Ministry of Culture and Education to represent Israel at the Biennale de Paris, France. In 1965 he won an acquisition award on behalf of the Tel Aviv Museum and was sent to Biennale de Paris again. In 1966 Gattegno won the Sharet scholarship for overseas studies from the America Israel Cultural Foundation and moved to Paris, with his wife. During his studies in Paris, he graduated from the Ecole Nationale Superieure des Beaux-Arts and École nationale supérieure des arts appliqués et des métiers d'art.

== International exhibitions ==
- Group Exhibition in Ostend, Belgium
- Group Exhibition, Centre Berger, Paris
- Group Exhibition in Cherbourg, France
- Solo exhibition at "Gallery Yves Brun", Paris
- Solo exhibition at De Sfinx, Amsterdam
- Solo exhibition sponsored by the organization Baron de Rothschild, France.
- Solo exhibition at Torrier Ardeche, France

== Exhibitions in Israel ==
- Solo exhibition Painters and Sculptors Association booth, Tel Aviv
- Exhibition "Day mode", "Bezalel" museum, Jerusalem
- Solo exhibition at Dugit museum
- Solo exhibition at "Liioik art house", Tel Aviv
- Solo exhibition at the Holon Municipal museum
- Solo exhibition at "Shlush Gallery", Tel Aviv
- Solo exhibition at "Efrat Gallery", Tel Aviv
