= Nurit David =

Israeli painter and art educator (born 1952)

Nurit David (Hebrew: נורית דוד; born June 24, 1952, Tel Aviv, Israel) is an Israeli painter and art educator known for her contributions to contemporary Israeli art. Her works often explore themes of identity, memory, literature, and cultural narratives. David’s creative career spans several decades and has earned her awards and recognition both in Israel and internationally.

== Early life and education ==
Nurit David was born in Tel Aviv and grew up in Ness Ziona. From 1975 to 1978, she studied at HaMidrasha, the Art Teachers' Training College in Ramat HaSharon, where she developed a passion for painting and visual arts. Her academic involvement continued when she became a teacher of painting at the same institution, now known as Beit Berl College School of Art, from 1986 to 2007. Between 2002 and 2006, she also taught painting at the Bezalel Academy of Arts and Design.

== Artistic career ==
Since 1982, David has been associated with the Givon Gallery in Tel Aviv. Her work frequently engages with literature, historical references, and personal narratives.

David lives and works in Tel Aviv, where she remains a part of the Israeli art community.

== Notable solo exhibitions ==
- 1979: Sara Gilat Gallery, Jerusalem
- 1987: “ABA (Father),” Israel Museum, Jerusalem
- 1991: “To Learn Writing from Trees,” Givon Gallery, Tel Aviv (catalogue)
- 1994: “Paintings after ‘Dubliners’ by James Joyce,” Givon Gallery, Tel Aviv
- 2001: “Landscapes,” Herzliya Museum of Art
- 2007: “I Was Born Chinese,” Tel Aviv Museum of Art (catalogue)
- 2015: “Two Cities, the Same Island,” Haifa Museum of Art
- 2017: “Nobody’s Clothing / An Outline for a Business,” Givon Gallery
- 2022: “Ibn Gabirol Bau – Winter Version,” Givon Art Forum, Tel Aviv

== Selected group exhibitions ==
- 1986: “The Want of Matter as a Quality in Israeli Art,” Tel Aviv Museum of Art
- 1991: 21st Biennial of São Paulo, Brazil
- 1993: “Makom,” Museum of Modern Art, Vienna
- 1998: “After Rabin – New Art from Israel,” Jewish Museum, New York
- 2005: “Die Neue Hebräer,” Gropius Bau, Berlin
- 2019: “Keeping at Distance,” Petach Tikva Museum of Art
- 2022: “Material Imagination,” Tel Aviv Museum of Art

== Awards and recognition ==
- 1983: Beatrice S. Colliner Award for Young Artists, Israel Museum, Jerusalem
- 1993: Sandberg Prize for Israeli Art, Israel Museum, Jerusalem
- 2003: Minister of Culture and Education, Israel Prize for Art and Design
- 2006: Rappaport Prize, Tel Aviv Museum of Art
- 2015: Dizengoff Prize, Tel Aviv Municipality
- 2017: Life Achievement Prize, Ministry of Culture and Education, Israel
- 2018: Honorary Fellowship, Tel Aviv Museum of Art

== Collections ==
David’s works are held in major public collections, including:

- The Israel Museum, Jerusalem
- Tel Aviv Museum of Art
- Ein Harod Museum
- The Jewish Museum, New York
- Bank Discount Art Collection, Rishon, lezion

== Publications ==
In addition to her painting, David has contributed essays and stories to art magazines and exhibition catalogues. Notable publications include:

- 1990: “While Beuys Was Pregnant,” Feminine Presence catalogue, Tel Aviv Museum of Art
- 1996: “Towards a Body and From It,” The Van Leer Jerusalem Institute
- 2007: “The Landscape Teacher,” Tel Aviv Museum of Art catalogue
- 2016: “The Happy Business,” story accompanying the exhibition “Nobody’s Clothing.”
