= HaMidrasha – Faculty of the Arts =

Art school of Beit Berl College

- המדרשה לאמנות
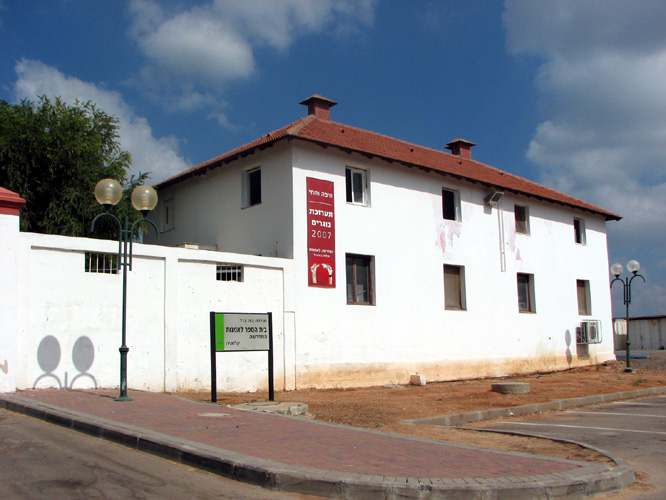
- Former names: HaMidrasha for Painting Teachers, HaMidrasha Le'Omanut, HaMidrasha LeMorim LeTziyur
- Type: Art School
- Established: 1946
- Parent institution: Beit Berl College
- Dean: Hila Peleg
- Academic staff: Michal Na'aman, Roee Rosen, Ido Bar-El
- Location: Beit Berl, Sharon plain, 4490500, Israel; 32.200699°N 34.918464°E
- Website: Faculty of Arts – HaMidrasha

HaMidrasha – Faculty of the Arts, also known as HaMidrasha Le'Omanut, HaMidrasha Art School, or simply HaMidrasha, is an Israeli art school founded in 1946, and located in Tel Aviv, Israel. It was founded as an independent institution, and it now is one of three departments within the Beit Berl College.

== History ==
In 1946, HaMidrasha art school was established as an arts and crafts teacher education institution. The head of the school was Eliyahu Beiles and it was affiliated with the "Workers' Trend" or trade in the educational system. The school then operated in the evenings in a building that served as a primary school in Tel Aviv. Later on, crafts studies were separated from HaMidrasha and its name was changed to "HaMidrasha for Painting Teachers."

In 1964 "HaMidrasha" was transferred to the ownership of the Ministry of Education. Two years later it began operating during days instead of evenings. Between 1966 and 1980 Ran Shehori was head of the institution, and in 1972 it moved to buildings in Herzliya, who were allotted to the Ministry of Education by the Herzliya Municipality. It was during these years that the figure of Raffi Lavie became dominant in the school. Lavie, who started to teach at "HaMidrasha" in 1965, developed a teaching method which focused on the understanding of artistic language, rather than on skills and techniques. Under his influence, a group of artists formed, who would later be known as the core of the Want of Matter movement in Israeli Art. These included Michal Na'aman, Tamar Getter and Nurit David, among others.

In 1977 the "HaMidrasha" moved again, this time to Ramat HaSharon. In the same year, the Institute for Training of Art Instructors was established as part of the institution. In 1980, Shlomo Vitkin was appointed as head of the school, serving till 1997. During his tenure, in 1987, the Midrasha merged with Beit Berl College. In 1989 a study framework called "The Open Midrasha" was created. It still exists, now known as "The Personal Study program of the Arts".

In 1995 HaMidrasha moved to Kalmania, a part of the Beit Berl campus and a former agricultural farm. In 1997 Yair Garbuz replaced Vitkin as head of the school. In 1999 "HaMidrasha" became an Academic institution and was accredited to award a BEd.F.A. bachelor's degree in arts education by the Israeli Council for Higher Education. In 2008 the school was further accredited to award a graduate degree – MEd in art education.

In 1998 the Film Department was established within HaMidrasha.

In 2008 the school was further accredited to award a graduate degree – M.Ed. in Art Education. Since 2017, HaMidrasha has also offered a Master's Degree in Art Therapy (M.A.A.T.)

In 2009 Doron Rabina was appointed as head of the school, and a bachelor's degree filmmaking program was launched. In 2011 a postgraduate studies program was established. In 2011 a preparatory program for undergraduate studies was opened, in the Arabic language. In 2014 Beit Berl College structurally transformed to a faculty based organization, and "HaMidrasha" became the institution's Faculty of the Arts.

Artist Gabi Klezmer was the dean between 2015 and 2018.

Video artist Guy Ben-Ner was appointed Dean of the Faculty in 2018.

Curator Hila Peleg was appointed Dean in 2024.

== Art gallery ==
Over the years, "HaMidrasha" operated several galleries, both in the Kalmaniya campus and in Tel Aviv. Since 2014, HaMidrasha Gallery is located in 19 HaYarkon Street, Tel Aviv.

== See also ==
- Art in Tel Aviv
