= Tamar Getter =

Israeli artist and teacher (born 1953)

Tamar Getter תמר גטר
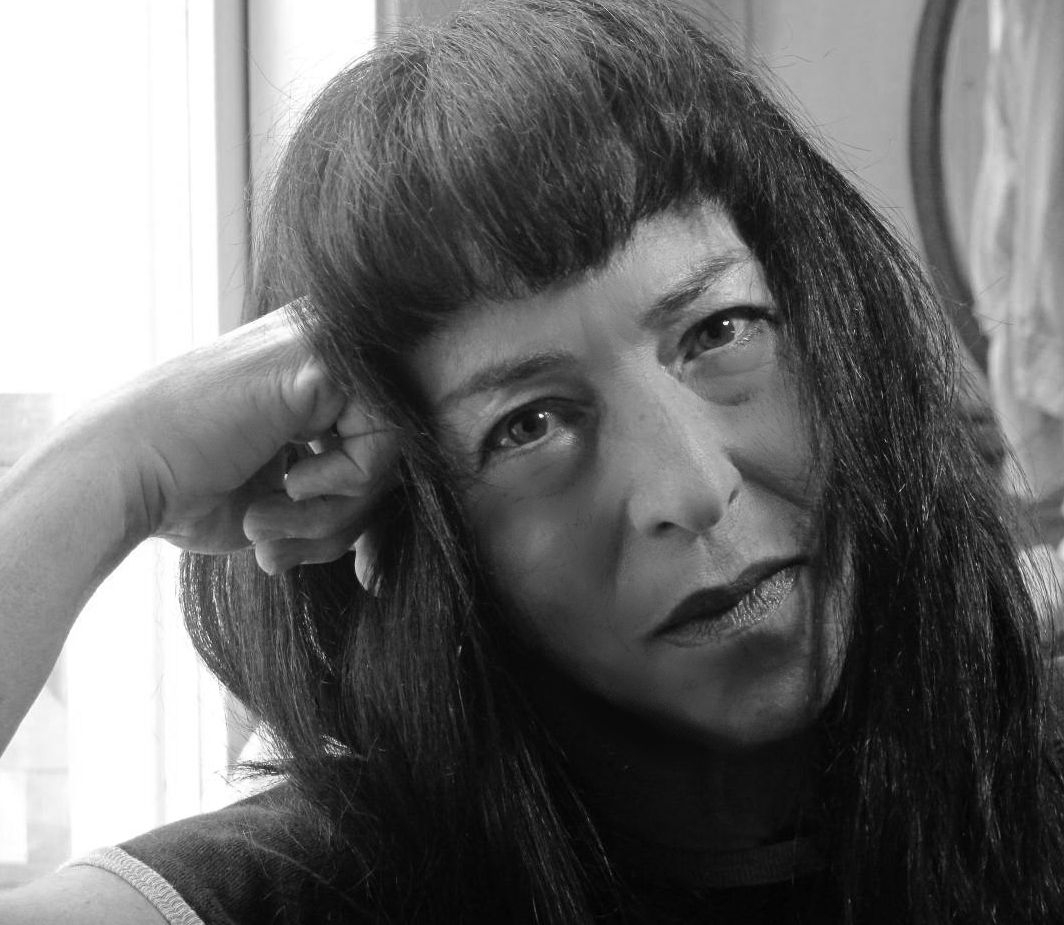
- Photograph of Tamar Getter
- Born: 1953 (age 72–73); Tel Aviv
- Known for: Painting

Tamar Getter (Hebrew: תמר גטר; born in Tel Aviv, April 1953) is an Israeli artist and teacher.

== Biography ==
Tamar Getter, born in Tel Aviv in 1953, is an Israeli painter.

Getter studied at Hamidrasha Art School with Raffi Lavie in 1971-1972, and soon after began to exhibit her works and gain recognition as a promising young Israeli artist. In the second half of the 1970s Getter created a series of paintings known as the Tel Hai cycle. These works, which are dominated by scales of monochromatic colors and materials not considered "artistic," stood in confrontation with the images of the Tel Hai series that signified, in Zionist culture, the myth of Israeli heroism, images of sightedness and blindness, and of corpses and torsos. She worked in mixed media (e.g., photography and drawing) and adopted various perceptions of space in one work. This collaged approach, and the use of different, alien components to deal with "heroic" subjects, distinguishes her art.

The conflict between logic and rationalism, and the expressive and grotesque dimension, appears again in many of the works from her late period, from the 1990s on, such as in the painting Double Monster (1996) or the series The Asia Society's Building (2003). In these works, Getter reconstructs idealistic structures from Western art that emphasize the insufficiency of the human body, using squeegees of paint and mechanical drawing tools such as plumb lines. Her technique in painting tends to put together materials not usually combined. This collagist approach, which uses different and alien elements in the same work, characterized many of the artists in Getter's circle, Michal Na'aman, Yair Garbuz, and Raffi Lavie, who was probably the artist who inculcated this principle in his colleagues and pupils.

Getter also studied literature at Tel Aviv University.

Getter lives and works in Tel Aviv.

== Education ==
- 1970-72 Studied painting with Raffi Lavie
- 1975-1979 - Tel Aviv University, Poetics and Comparative Literature studies (BA)
- 1975-76 Art studies at the State Art Teaching Training College, Ramat Hasharon
- 1983-1984 New York
- 1986 Germany

== Teaching ==
- Teaches in Bezlalel Academy of Art and Design

== Awards and prizes ==
- 1979 Tel Aviv University Senior Year Scholarship, Tel Aviv University
- 1981 The Jacques O’Hana Prize for the Young Israeli Artist, Tel Aviv Museum of Art
- 1989 Jack O'Hara Prize for a Young Israeli Artist, Tel Aviv Museum of Art
- 1994 Minister of Science and the Arts Prize
- 1995 The Sandberg Prize for Israeli Art, Israel Museum, Jerusalem, Israel
- 1995 Award from the Kunstlerhaus Mousonjturm Guest Studio, Frankfurt am Main, Germany
- 2003 Prize for Encouragement of Creative Art, Ministry of Culture and Education
- 2019 Dizengoff prize winner

== Gallery ==
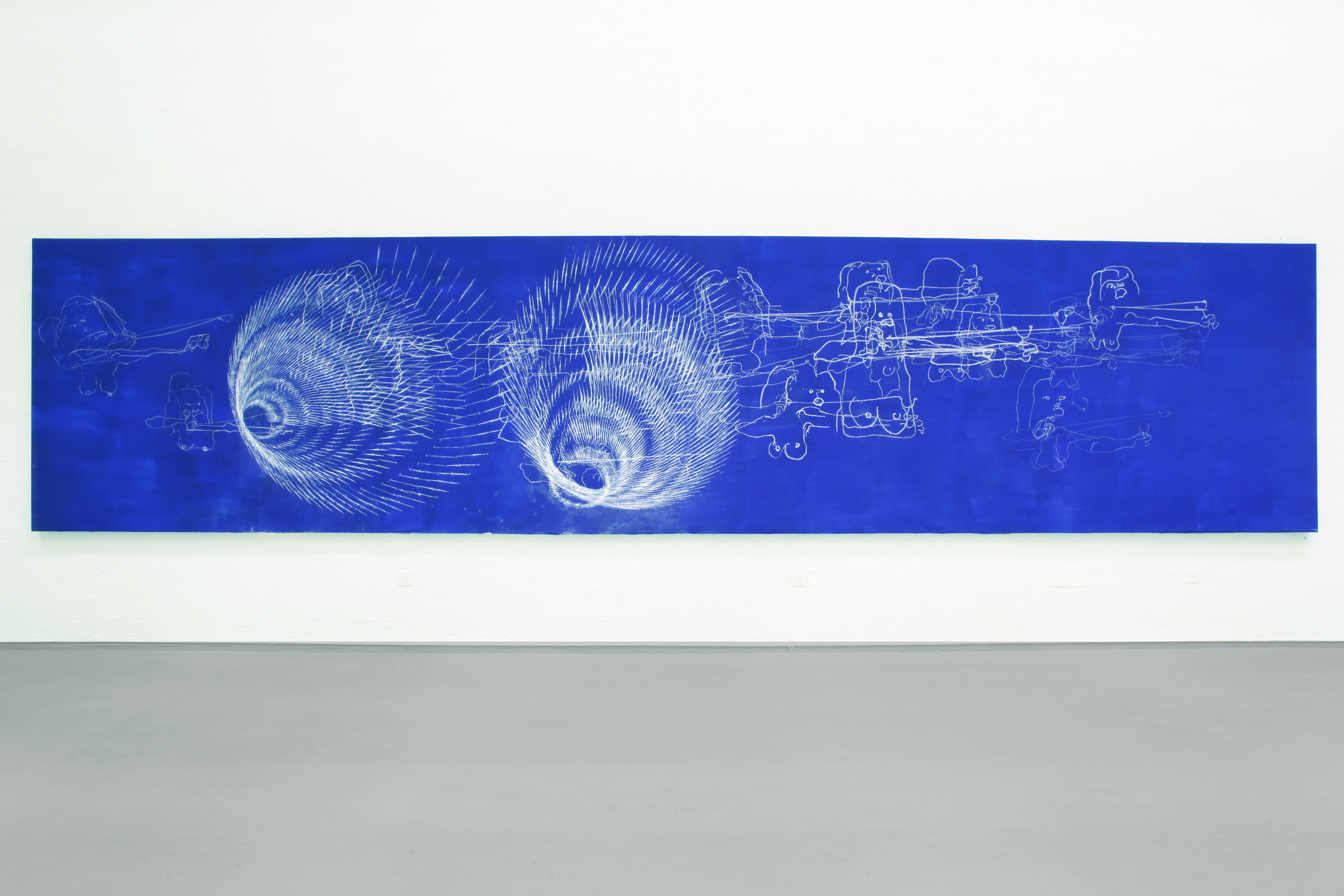
BLUE SLINGSHOT GIRL (vers.1)2003

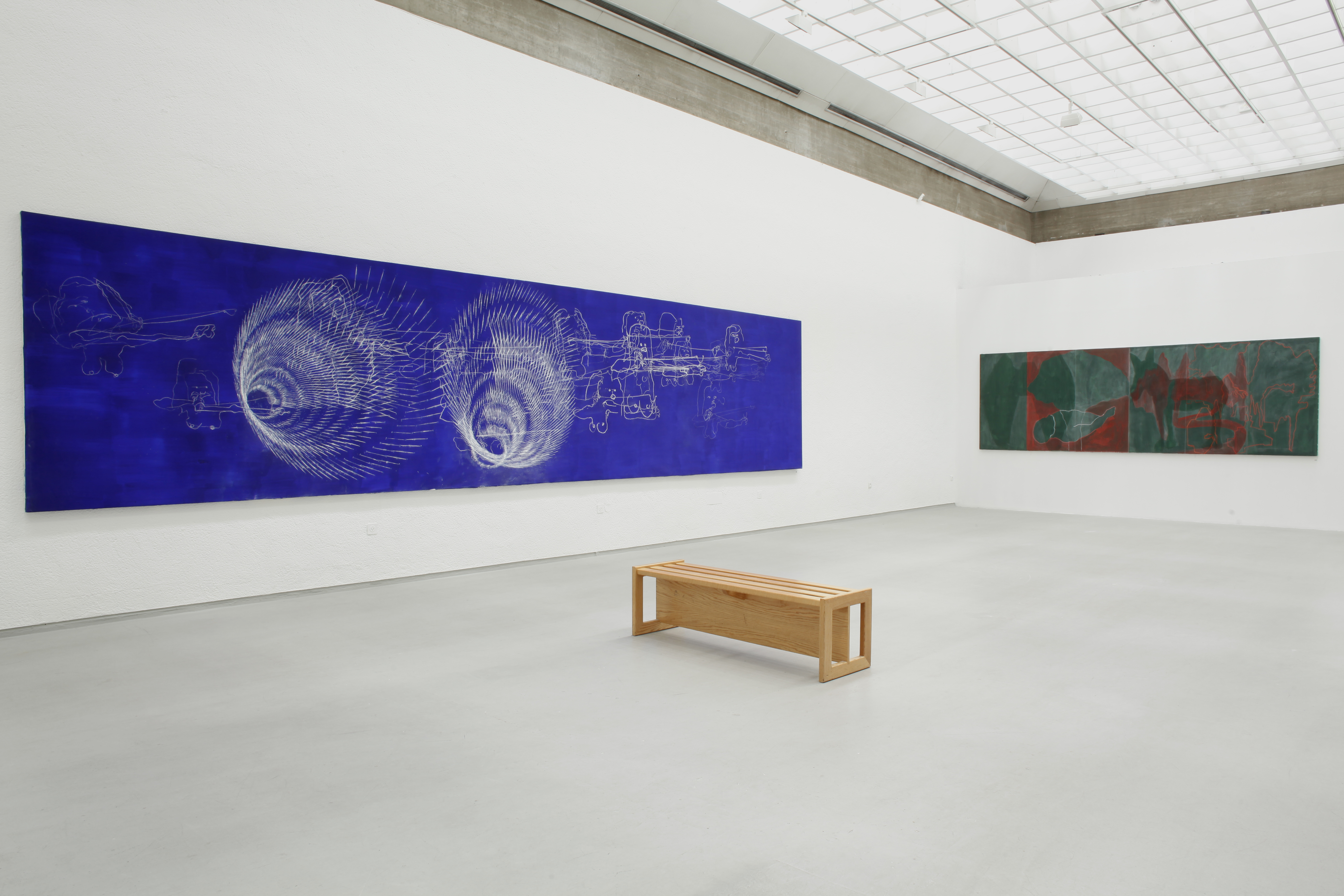
BLUE SLINGSHOT GIRL (vers.1)2003

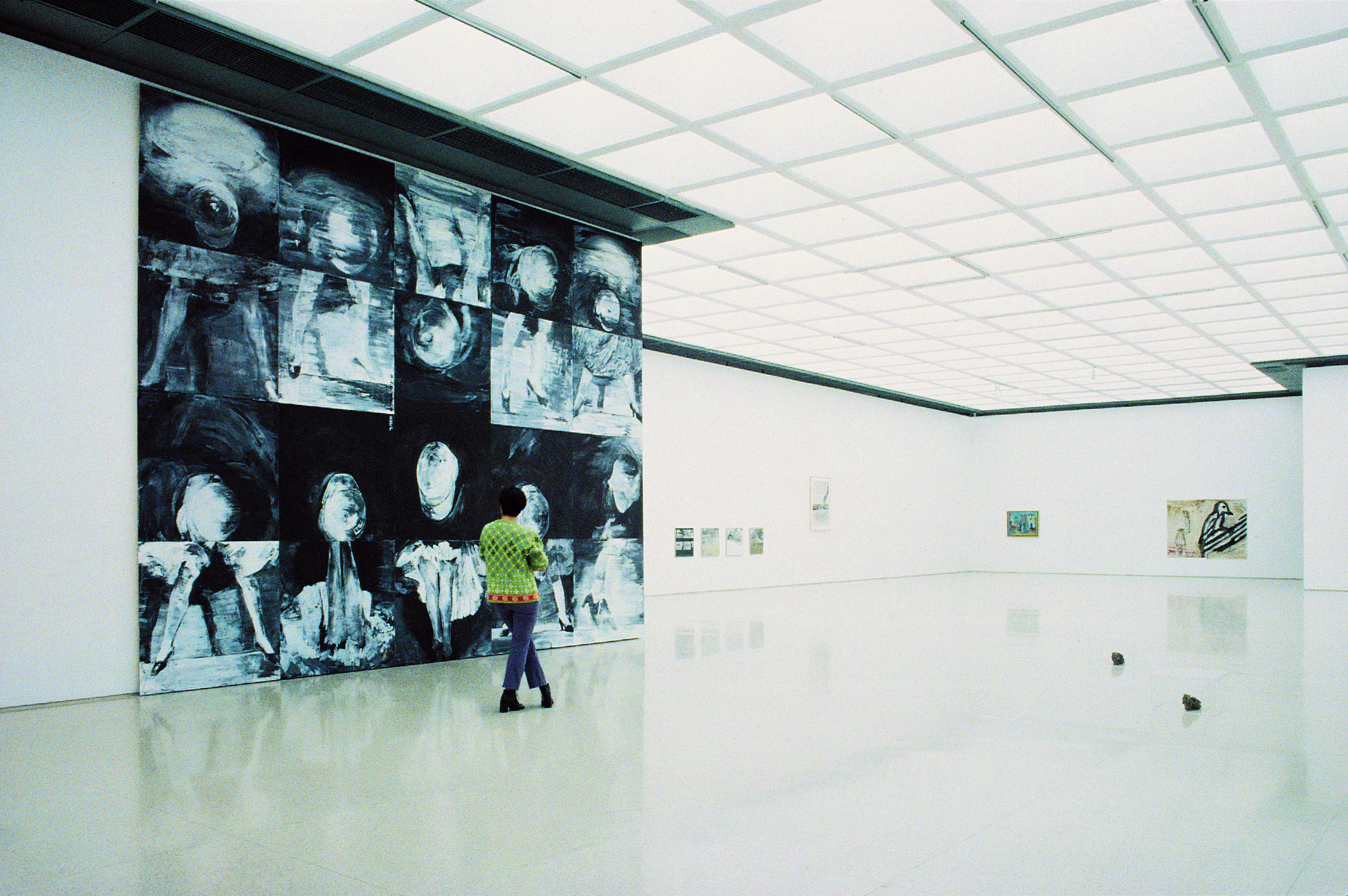
Death and the Maiden 2001

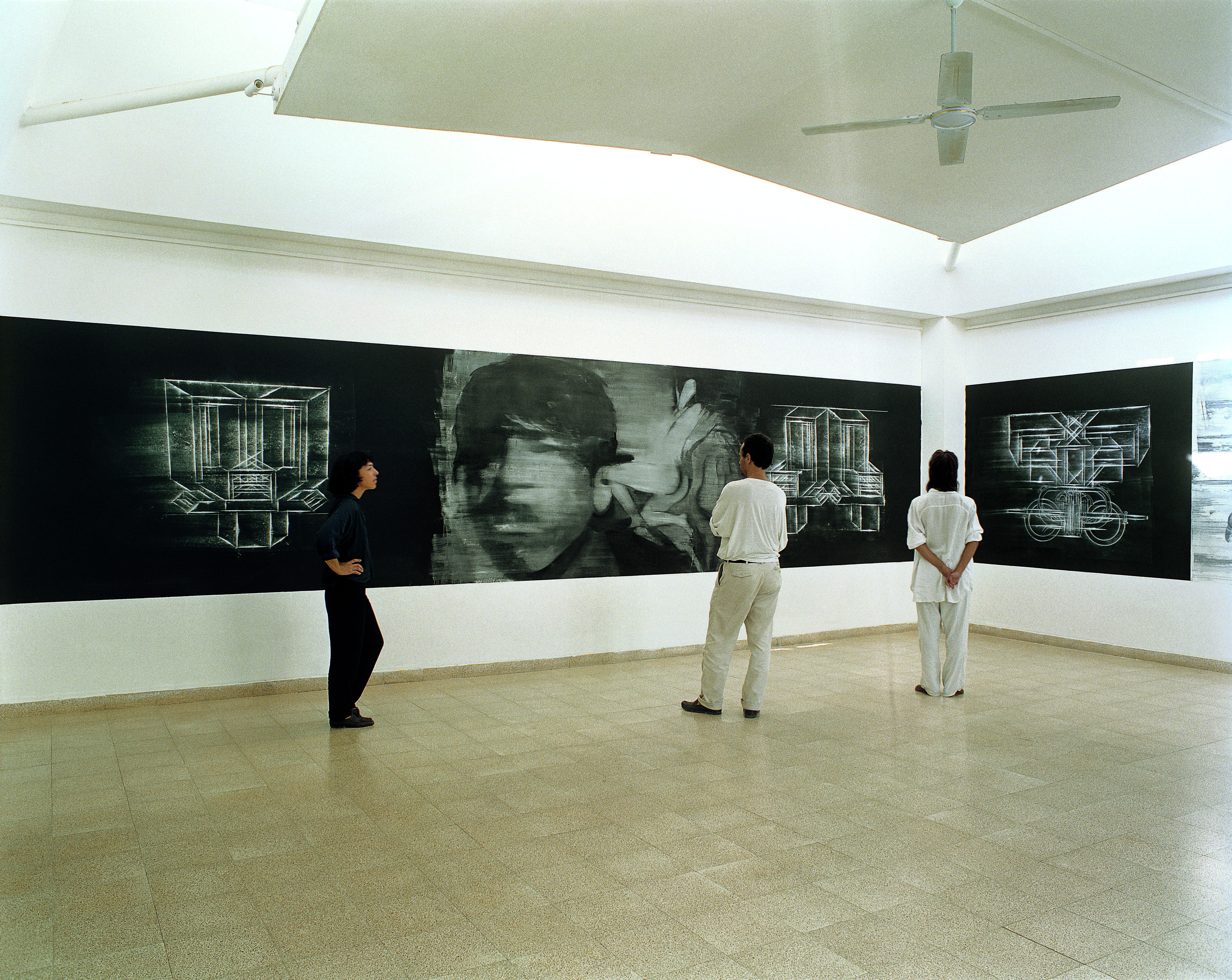
DOUBLE ENTRANCES 1995

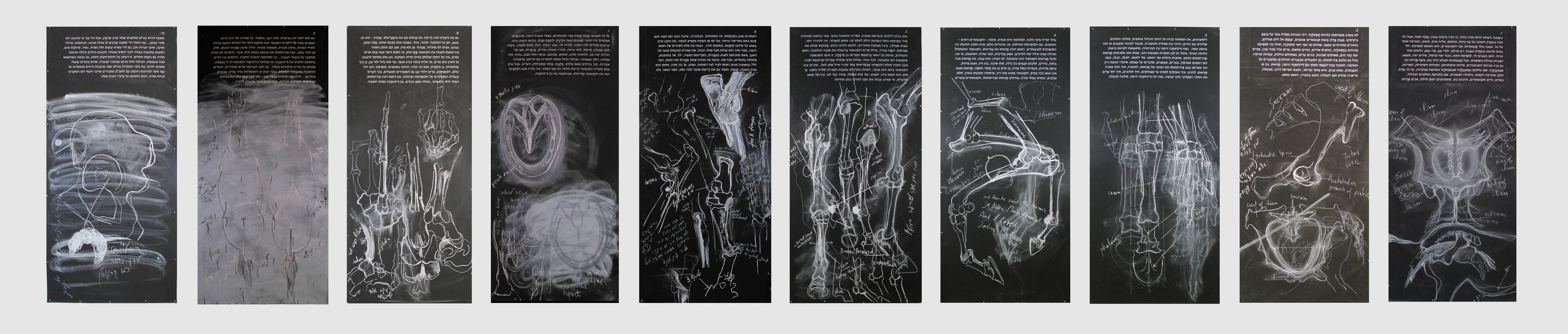
CENTAUROMACHIA 2018

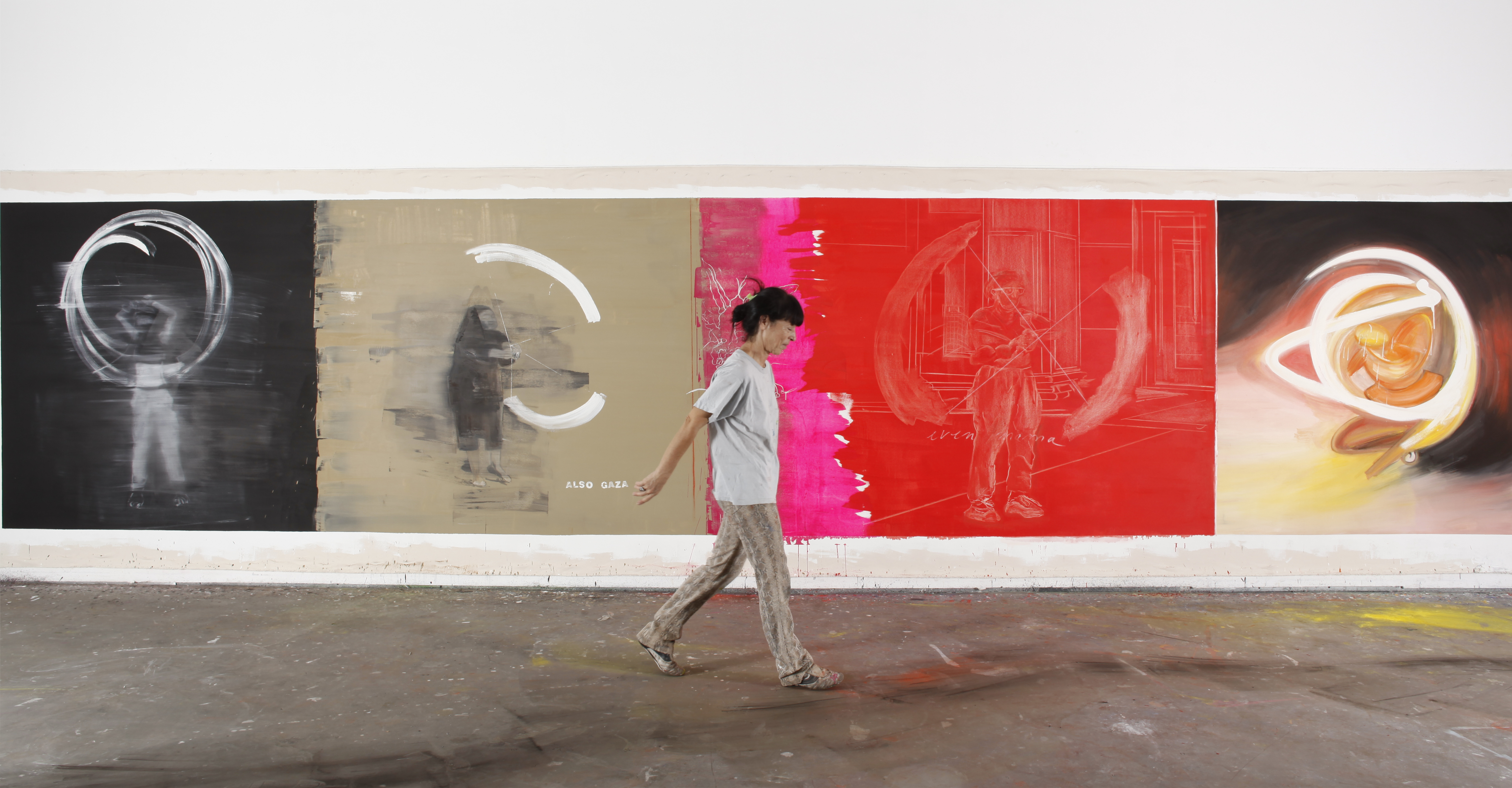
GO2 panel 8 - 2010

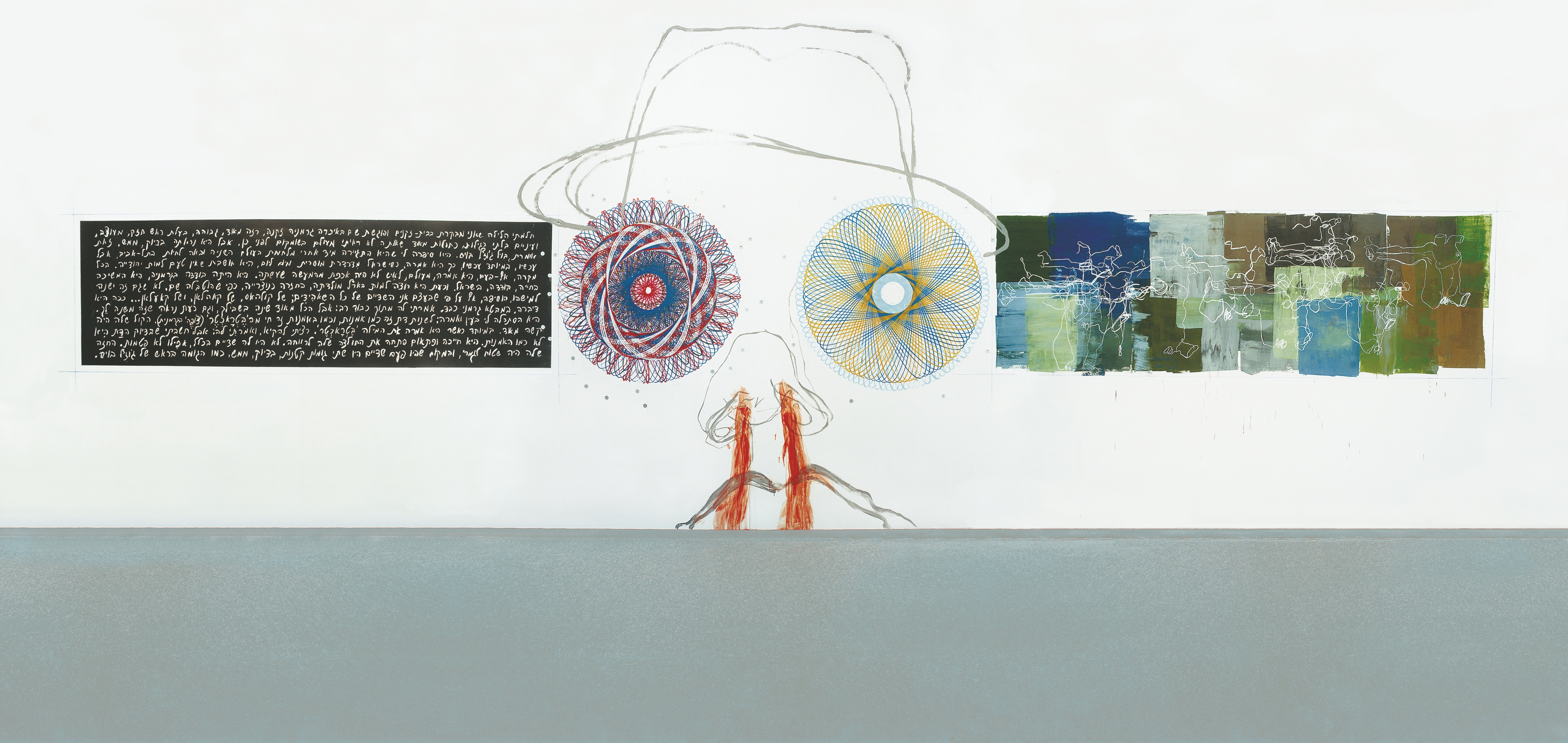
DER BETRACHTER - 2002

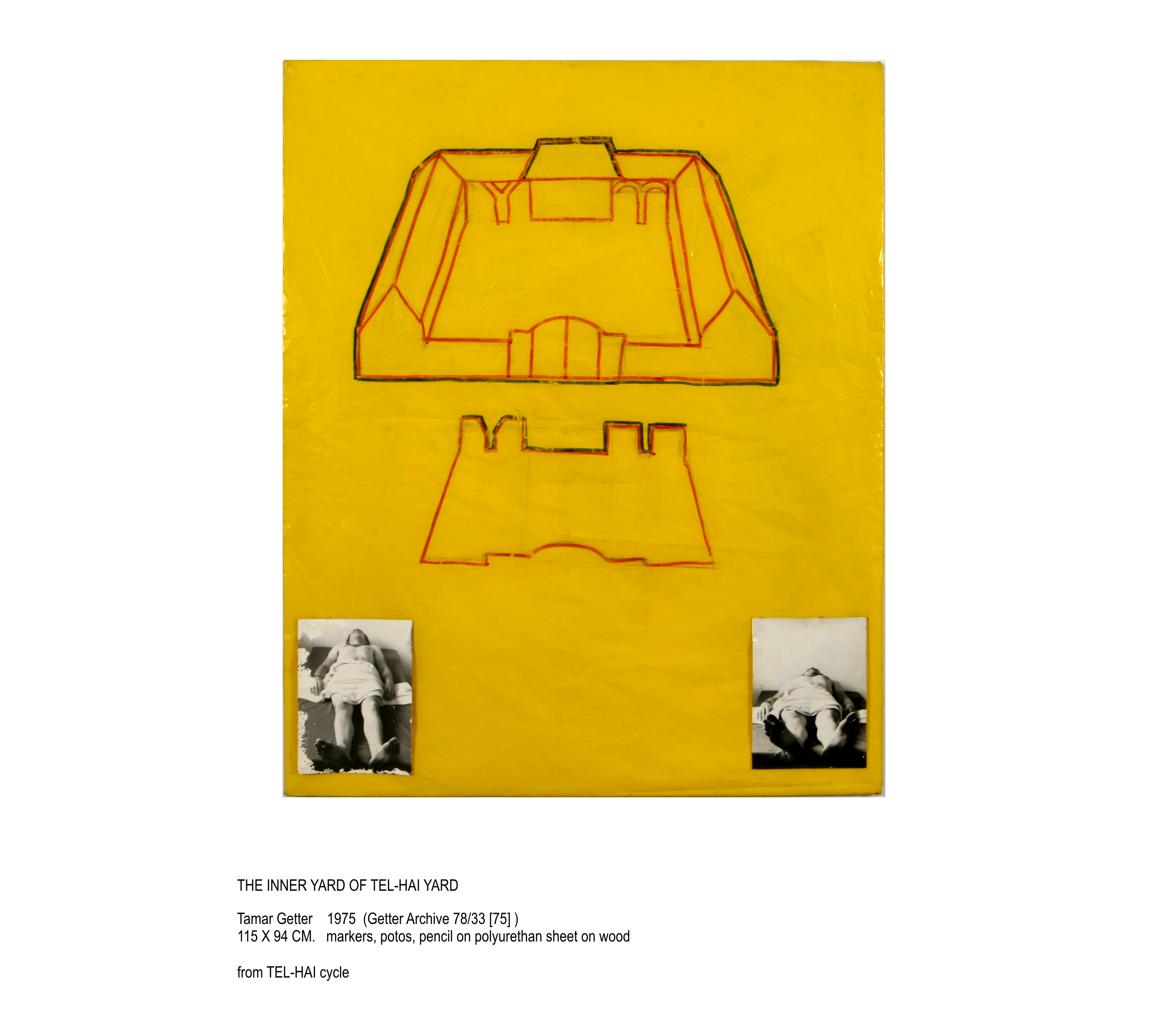
THE INNER YARD OF TEL-HAI YARD 1978
