= Aviva Uri =

Israeli painter

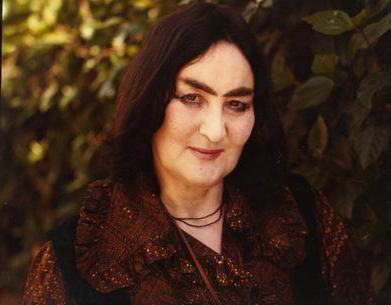
- Born: March 12, 1922; Safad, Gaillee, British Palestine
- Died: September 1, 1989 (aged 67); Tel Aviv, Israel
- Known for: Painting
- Movement: Israeli art

Aviva Uri (Hebrew: אביבה אורי; March 12, 1922 – September 1, 1989) was an Israeli painter.

== Biography ==
Aviva Uri studied dance with Gertrude Kraus. In 1941, she married Moshe Levin, with whom she had a daughter, Rachel. In 1943, she studied painting with Moshe Castel, continuing with David Hendler in 1944. She married Hendler in 1963. She cultivated an unusual appearance, wearing white face makeup and dark eye-shadow, and oversized black clothing. She deliberately falsified her age, claiming she was born in 1927. She died in Tel Aviv in 1989.

== Artistic style ==
Uri's expressive drawings focused on line and composition. Her abstract drawings link her to the "New Horizons" group, but suggest an alternative to the abstract art being created in the country: instead of oils, she created drawings on paper; instead of the professional mixing of colors, she used no coloration; instead of Paris, she was influenced by Japan and China, or other individualists (Hans Hartung). Uri's free line influenced younger artists, such as Raffi Lavie.

== Awards and prizes ==
- Dizengoff Prize for Painting and Sculpture, Tel Aviv, 1953
- Dizengoff Prize, Tel Aviv Museum, 1956
- Sandberg Prize for Israeli Art, Israel Museum, Jerusalem, 1976
- Prize of the Lea Porat Council of Culture and Art, 1985
- America-Israel Cultural Foundation, 1986
- Histadrut Prize, 1989
- Gutman Prize, 1989

== See also ==
- Visual arts in Israel
