= Nahum Tevet =

Artist (born 1946)

Nahum Tevet נחום טבת
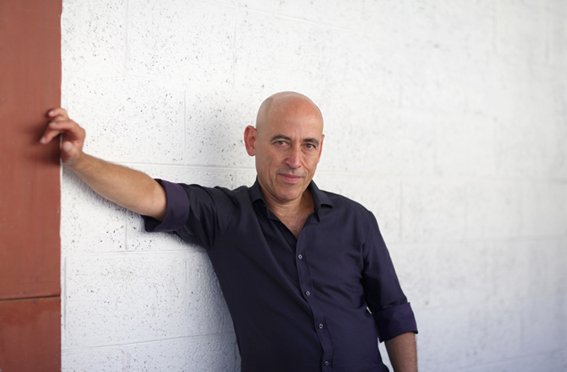
- Photograph of Nahum Tevet by Uri Gershuni
- Born: 1946 (age 79–80); Kibbutz Mesilot, Mandatory Palestine
- Known for: Sculpture, Post-minimalism, Constructivism, Installation
- Movement: Israeli art
- Spouse: Neta Tevet
- Children: Yaal Tevet, Noam Tevet
- Awards: Emet Prize

Nahum Tevet (Hebrew: נחום טבת; born 1946, Kibbutz Mesilot, Mandatory Palestine) is an Israeli artists whose work was among early responses to the minimalist canon by introducing into his installations everyday domestic objects, metaphors and images like in: Corner (1973-4) and Arrangements of Six Units.

In the early 1980s, Tevet’s work turned reductivism upside-down by using geometrical-abstract vocabulary in large-scale intricate labyrinth-like sculptures and installations. Those turned into even more extensive installations in the later years 1990s – to today. Tevet has been the subject of major survey exhibitions at both the Israel Museum in Jerusalem and the Tel Aviv Museum

His work has been part of exhibitions worldwide since 1975, such as numerous solo and group exhibitions in Europe and the United States, among which Documenta 8 (1987), the Sao Paulo Biennale (1994), the Biennale of Lyon (1997), the Venice Biennale (2003) and the Carnegie International (1999), and museum shows at the Museum Moderner Kunst Stiftung Ludwig in Vienna (1997), Dundee Contemporary Art (2004), the Museo d’Arte Contemporanea Roma (2008), the Kunstmuseum Bochum (2015), Museum Sztuki Łódź (2017) and Museum Villa Stuck, Munich (2017). His work is included in many museum collections including MOMA, New York, the Philadelphia Museum of Art, Museum Sztuki, Łódź, the Ludwig Foundation, Vienna, the Kaiser Wilhelm Museum, Krefeld, Magasin3, Stockholm, Kunsthalle Mannheim, FRAC Bretagne, the Israel Museum, Jerusalem and the Tel Aviv Museum of Art.

== Life and career ==
Nahum Tevet (Toib) was born in 1946 in Kibbutz Messilot, Mandatory Palestine, to his father Mendel Toib and mother Feiga Merin -Toib, both immigrated from Poland in the 1930's. His mother died when he was a baby.

Nahum was raised in the Kibbutz, and while in high school he starts taking art classes at the art teachers’ school of Oranim Collage (1962-3), with teachers like Marcel Janco, Claire Ianiv and Sima Slonim.

In 1965 he was drafted to the army and after 3 years of obligatory service he returned to his home in the Kibbutz where he set an art studio and worked as a gardener. He started studying on a private mentoring basis with painter Rafi Lavie (1969). Influenced by Lavie he painted on Plywood, However, unlike his mentor, Tevet was not interested in what's going on within the paintings format but rather in the painting as an object, its place and its function within the given space. As early as 1970-71 he stops creating traditional painting and made objects and installations mostly from found materials.

In 1970 he married Neta Dominitz they kept living in Messilot, and have their first son Yaal in 1972.

In 1972 his first one-person exhibition took place at Sara Gilat Gallery, Jerusalem, in this show Tevet exhibited few sculptural objects made from plywood, paper, masking tapes etc (pic.) and some of his Works on Glass from the same year.

The American Artist Robert Rauschenberg saw Works on Glass while visiting Sara Gilat’s home and got very excited, he purchased five pieces from this series, he then asked to meet Tevet and later sent him a small grant and invited him to come to NYC and meet/work there, Tevet, having no money, arrived in NY only few years later in 1979-1980.

After the Yom Kippur War in 1973 the young family moved from the Kibbutz to Petah Tikva, a city near Tel Aviv, where they lived for few years.

In 1975, Tevet had his first show in Europe at the prestigious Galerie Schmella in Düsseldorf and by 1976 had his first museum solo show at the Israel Museum, Jerusalem (curated by Yona Fischer).

In 1979, he moved, with his family to New York, with the support of the America-Israel Cultural Foundation AICF. On the same year he has his second solo show in New York at the Bertha Urdang Gallery. There he exhibited: Installation for Two Rooms, a work that drew a lot of attention.

In 1980, while still in New York, Nahum Tevet was invited to teach at the Bezalel Academy of Arts and Design in Jerusalem, where he quickly became an influential figure as Professor for the Sculpture at the Art Department. By the summer 2000 Tevet was asked to become head of the Advance studies program and was leading the opening of the Bezalel Branch of Salame Street in Tel Aviv. The program shortly became the first recognized MFA program in Israel. Tevet was its director 2001-2010 during this time the program quickly gained local importance and international respectful status and success. Nahum Tevet thought at Bezalel Academy during 1980 -2013.

During the 1980's Tevet produced two series of group of works: Narcissus Series (1980–84) and Painting lesson series (1983-1990), these formalized Tevet’s thoughts and ideas setting the foundation for the works he will make in the coming decades.

1990s the Tel Aviv Museum produced an extensive exhibition of Painting Lesson series titled Painting lessons-Sculptures (1983-1990) curated by Yona Fisher.

In the 1990s a retrospective was held

In 2006 the Israel Museum, Jerusalem mounted Nahum Tevet Works 1993-2006 curated by Sarit Shapira

== Works '70s ==
Toward the late 1970, After his solo show at the Israel Museum Jerusalem, He started to develop his Drawing installations For Given Rooms, where similar drawings appeared more than once, as if they were mirroring on opposite walls or in a nearby room. These works came after Installation for two Rooms at the Bertha Urdang Gallery NYC which was the starting point of a major series of large sculptural installations titled the Narcissus Series. In Narcissus Series (1979-1984), large, 'drawing in space' like wooden structures serves to investigate questions of memory and perception.

Reflections, repetitions and mirroring, in these dynamic sculptures there is a gradual development in complexity which remain, as of today, one of the main characteristics of his work.

== The Painting Lessons Sculptures 1983-1990 ==
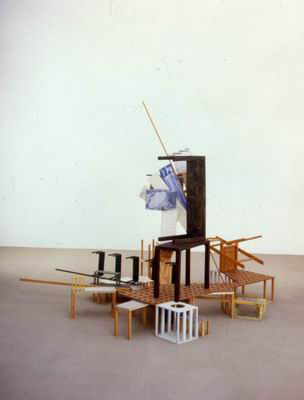
Painting Lesson n°5, 1986, collection of the Israel Museum

In this large scale intricate colourful and playful floor (sometimes floor and wall) sculptures, Tevet breaks the distinction between sculpture and painting, while examining both media and the 20s Century historical, modernist and canonic movements. From this group of works many were shown in few European Museum shows, in Documenta 8 and Kassel 1987 (pic). The whole series was the subject of a large exhibition at the Tel Aviv Museum of Art in 1991 (curator Yona Fischer, Catalog).

The British critic-philosopher Michael Newman wrote about the painting Lessons in 1986:

"…We haven't simply left the "Master narratives" behind, but rather continued it in the form "the End of the master narrative"… these speculations are not irrelevant aside, but rather a precondition for understanding the exemplary nature of Tevet sculptures and the reason why it is among the most important art being made today….”

== Room Works, 1993-2006 ==
There were few "rules" to the large rooms floor installations Nahum Tevet created between 1993-2006: In these works, Tevet took away the highly painterly surface, which was so present in the former Painting Lessons Series, and created instead furniture's like modules which components were painted in the same way a housepainter would coat his furniture. Within the painterly/sculptural/architectural vectors typical to his artistic project, here the painterly aspect is less present.

Despite its complexity, there is no clear constructions behind these works, only “things” standing on the floor near/on each other or leaning, like in a storage or a shop. They are mostly arranged following a grid, and yet, without any visible rational code.

The earlier works of this group is Man with Camera 1993-94 and Untitled 1995-6 followed by A Page from a Catalogue,1998 in which Tevet introduced the "white partitions" a new element which serves as architectonic device, defining areas within the work while creating breaks in the narratives of the event.

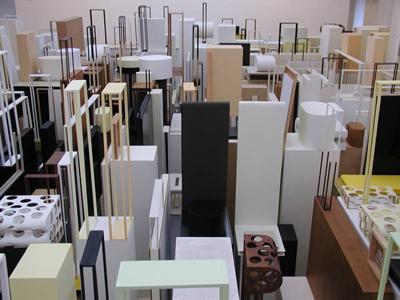
Seven Walks, 1997-2004

Seven Walks 1997-2004 is the Magnum Opus of his installations, measuring 9 x 13 meters took 8 years of work to be completed. The work, made out of thousands of constructed and painted single elements. It grew organically without a plan. It takes the whole room leaving a narrow passageway for the viewer- between the crowded complex installation and the walls of the room around it.

The installation creates a compressed, demanding, morbid situation, similar to a large labyrinth. It’s loaded with sculptural events, which offers many narratives for reading and interpretations yet it is constantly causing these to fail.

The complete group of room's installations was the subject of a large exhibition at the Israel Museum, Jerusalem: "Nahum Tevet-Works, 1993-2006" curated by Sarit Shapira.

== Gallery ==
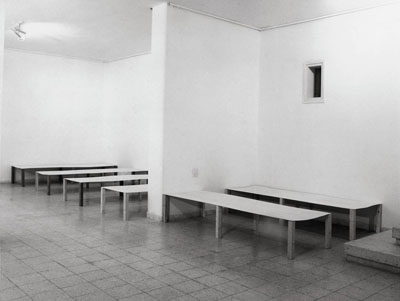
Arrangement of Six Units, 1973–74

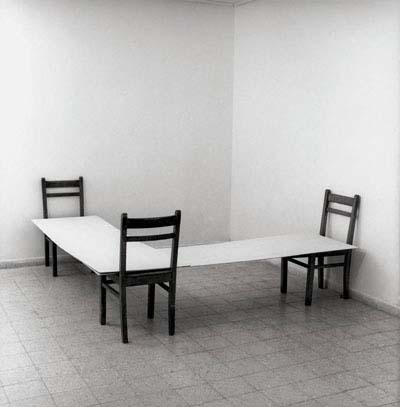
Corner, 1974
Tel Aviv Museum of Art Collection

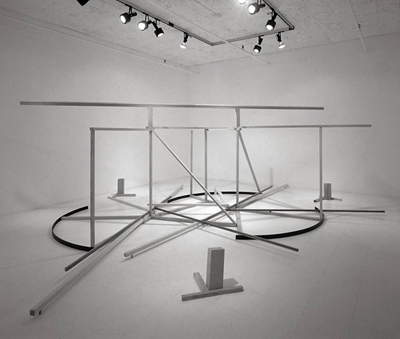
Narcissus, 1982

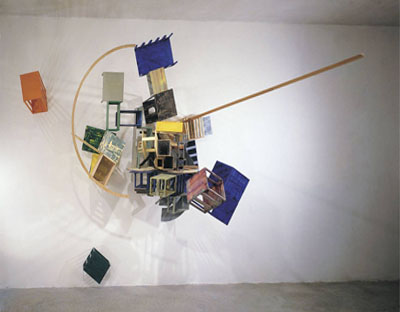
Jemmáin, 1986
Kunsthalle Mannheim Collection

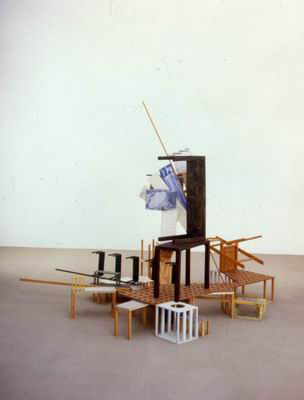
Painting Lesson, no 5, 1986
Israel Museum Collection

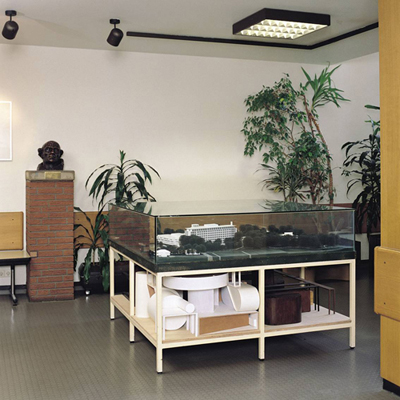
Underground Event, 1997
Glaskasten Sculpture Museum, Marl Collection

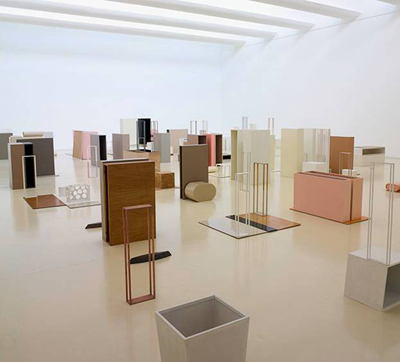
Several Things, 2008

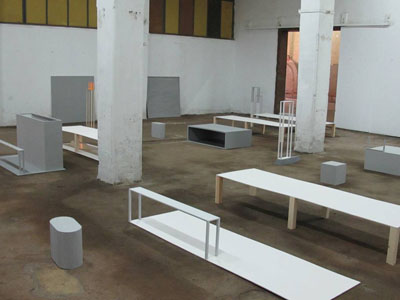
At the Same Time, 2010

== Awards and recognition ==
- 2013 The EMET Prize for Art, Science and Culture, the AMN Foundation for the Advancement of Science, Art and Culture in Israel
- 2011 Dizengoff Prize for Painting and Sculpture, Tel Aviv- Jaffa
- 2007 Life Achievement Award, Ministry of Science, Culture and Sport
- 1992 Minister of Education and Culture Prize for an Israeli Artist
- 1991 Fondek Prize, Tel Aviv Museum of Art
- 1990 America-Israel Cultural Foundation
- 1986 Sandberg Prize, Israel Museum, Jerusalem
- 1984 Bank Discount Prize, Tel Aviv Museum

== Selected exhibitions ==
- 2022 - Kristof De Clercq Gallery, Ghent (October 22).
- 2018 - Museum Villa Stuck, Munich, Nahum Tevet / Efrat Natan
- 2017 - Museum Sztuki, Lodz, Poland, Nahum Tevet: Works on glass,1972-1975
- 2016 - Hunter College, New York, NY. Nahum Tevet: Works on Glass,1972-1975
- 2012 - Tel Aviv University, Walking on The Wall: Nahum Tevet:Small Sculptures, 1980–2012
- 2011 - Galeria Foksal, Warsaw, Poland
- 2010 - Łódz Biennale, Poland
- 2009 - Fondazione VOLUME! Roma
- 2008 - Herzliya Museum of Contemporary Art
- 2008 - Museo d’Arte Contemporanea Roma (MACRO)
- 2007 - The Israel Museum, Jerusalem, Nahum Tevet: Works, 1994–2006
- 2013 - Macro Museum, Rome
- 2004 - DCA Dundee Contemporary Art, Dundee
- 2003 - Venice Biennale
- 1997 - Lyon Contemporary art Biennale
- 1991 - Tel Aviv Museum
- 1987 - "Documenta 8", Kasel
- 1984 - The Israel Museum, Jerusalem
- 1984 - São Paulo Biennale
- 1976 - The Israel Museum, Jerusalem
