= Bertha Urdang =

Art gallery owner (1912–2001)

Bertha Urdang ברטה אורדנג
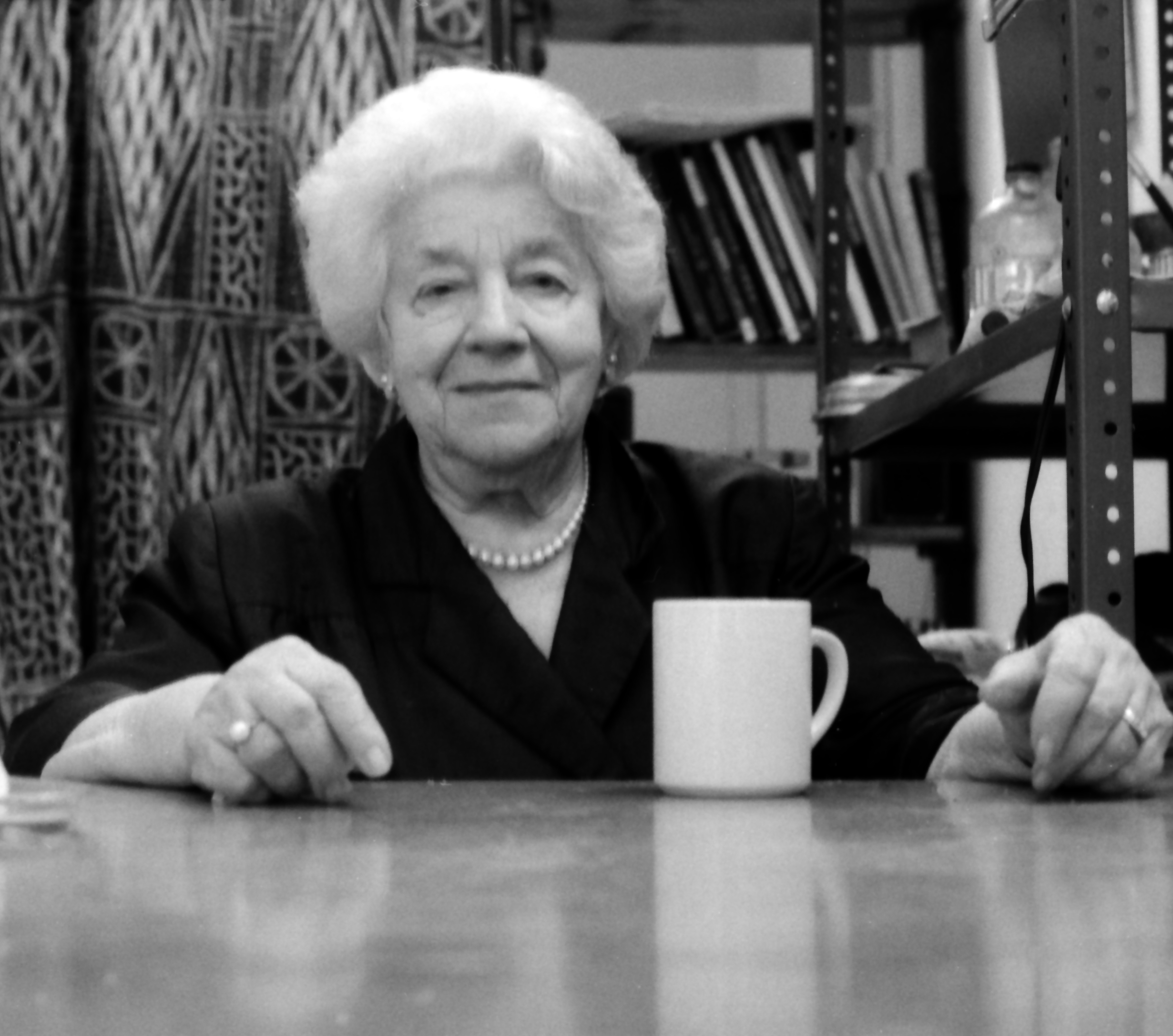
- Bertha Urdang photographed by Janak Rustam in 1992, New York City
- Born: April 12, 1912; London, England
- Died: February 22, 2001 (aged 88); Jerusalem, Israel
- Education: University of London, Sorbonne, Paris
- Known for: Gallery owner
- Movement: Israeli art
- Spouse: Tuvia Urdang

Bertha Urdang (Hebrew: ברטה אורדנג; April 12, 1912 – February 22, 2001) was an Israeli art collector and gallery owner born in England. She was important for encouraging and fostering Israeli abstract and conceptual art, as well as for distributing and publicizing Israeli art in the United States.

== Biography ==
Bertha Urdang studied the history of art at the University of London, aesthetics at the Sorbonne in Paris, and then made aliyah to the Land of Israel in 1934. That same year, she met the agronomist Tuvia Urdang. She later married him and they had three daughters. Tuvia was killed in 1948 by a land mine. In 1955, she and her partner Shmuel Engel opened the Rina Gallery in Jerusalem. In 1966, Urdang and Engel ended their business relationship. Engel renamed the gallery to Engel Gallery and Urdang opened a new Rina Gallery. She went to America for two months a year to spread the word on Israeli art and sell the work. In 1972, she opened a New York branch of her gallery across the street from the Whitney Museum. It became her residence and her show place for twenty years. Urdang closed her New York gallery in 1993 and moved to Beit HaKerem, Jerusalem. Bertha Urdang died in 2001 in Jerusalem.

Bertha Urdang’s archives are currently housed in the Information Center for Israeli Art, at the Israel Museum, Jerusalem.

== See also ==
Visual arts in Israel

== Bibliography ==
- Spitzer, Judith (1982). Artists' tribute to Bertha Urdang. Israel Museum, Jerusalem. OCLC 739133524.
