= Raffi Lavie =

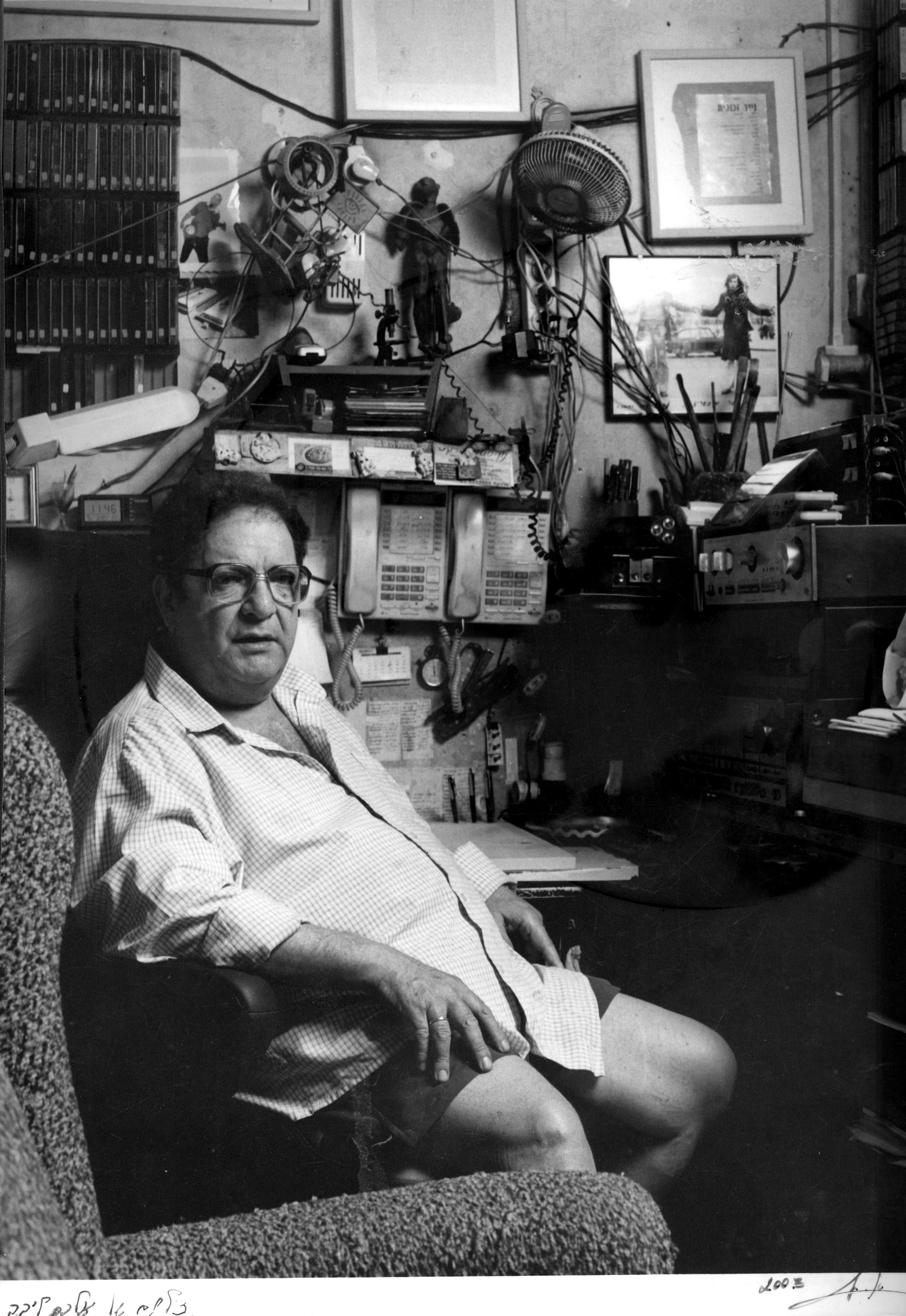
- Raffi Lavie, 2003
- Born: Rafael Lavi; February 23, 1937; Tel Aviv, Mandatory Palestine
- Died: 7 May 2007 (aged 70); Tel Aviv, Israel
- Known for: Painting

Raffi Lavie (Hebrew: רפי לביא; 23 February 1937 – 7 May 2007) was an Israeli educator and music/art critic. Lavie's work is a cross between graffiti and abstract expressionism.

== Biography ==
Rafael (Raffi) Lavi was born in Tel Aviv, During the British Mandate. He began teaching at HaMidrasha – Faculty of the Arts in 1966. That same year, he was also a founder of the group Ten Plus. Due to severe back problems, Lavie painted in his last years while sitting. On May 7, 2007, he died of pancreatic cancer at his home in Tel Aviv, aged 70. His body was donated to the University of Tel Aviv for research.

== Art career ==
He studied at the Art Teachers' Training College in Tel Aviv and later taught at the HaMidrasha – Faculty of the Arts in Ramat HaSharon.

In the early 1960s, Raffi Lavie began to paint in spontaneous scrawls reminiscent of graffiti and comic strip art. He wrote on his paintings as if they were walls covered with scribbles. His work has been described as angry, nervous, aggressive, and abrasive. He was invited to exhibit with "Ofakim Hadashim" (New Horizons) but his work challenged the delicate lyricism of the group. Towards the end of the 1960s, Lavi began to glue photographs, reproductions and posters on his works, combining varied aesthetic elements; kitsch, applied graphics, children's drawing, and political rhetoric. He scorned bourgeois prototypes of beauty, and sought to restore the image to art after its banishment by "New Horizons". The synthesis of scribbled line and collage is unique to Lavie's work. It has been compared to the work of American artist Cy Twombly.

In the mid 1960s, Lavie and his followers became known as the "Tel Aviv School" or the 10+ group. The group were the first to import pop art, avant garde, found object art, collage and photography into their work. "10+ injected irony, humor, and sophistication into Israeli art. They situated everyday objects such as dolls, fragments of papers, towels, and reproductions center stage. Israeli reality marched into the art world that discovered the everyday as proper material for creation." In 1986, curator Sara Breitberg-Semel presented the exhibit, "Want of Matter" at the Tel Aviv Museum. Breitberg-Semel "Want of Matter" thesis of the exhibit was that Lavie and the 10+ group used Jewish concepts and symbols, but the art was secular. She focused on the low-cost materials used in their work, such as plywood, cardboard, writing and scribbling within the work and other low-cost material. The use of such simple and cheap material identified with the establishment of Israel and thus created a new, unique Israel voice. In 2002, a retrospective exhibit opened at the Israel Museum in Jerusalem on Lavie entitled "Rafi Lavie: Works from 1950 to 2002". This exhibit had a new interpretation of Lavie and his followers work. The new interpretation showed how Lavie's work was romantic, rich, filled with the Jewish religion and European roots.

In 2005, he had a solo exhibition at Givon Gallery in Tel Aviv.

Lavie represented Israel in the 53rd Venice Biennale in 2009.

== Gallery ==
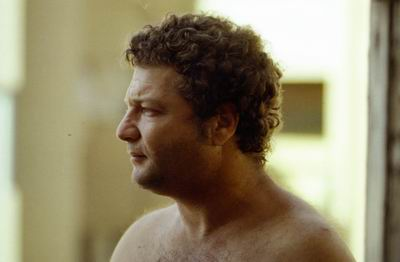
Raffi Lavie (1980)
Photographer: Stanley I. Batkin

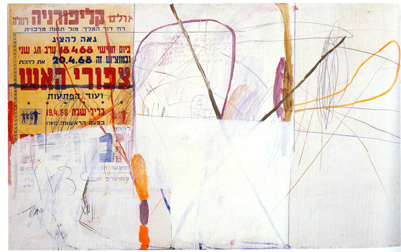
Untitled, 1969
Israel Museum Collection
B83.0006

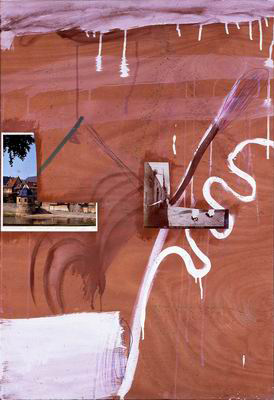
Untitled, 1977
Israel Museum Collection
B92.1599

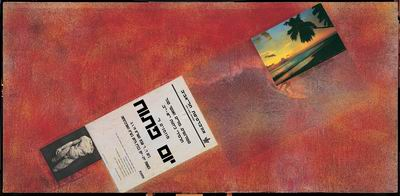
Untitled, 1983
Israel Museum Collection
B03.0063

== Awards ==
- 1978 The Dizengoff Prize for Painting and Sculpture, Municipality of Tel Aviv-Yafo, Tel Aviv
