= Shmuel Raayoni =

Israeli painter (1905–1995)

Shmuel Raayoni שמואל רעיוני
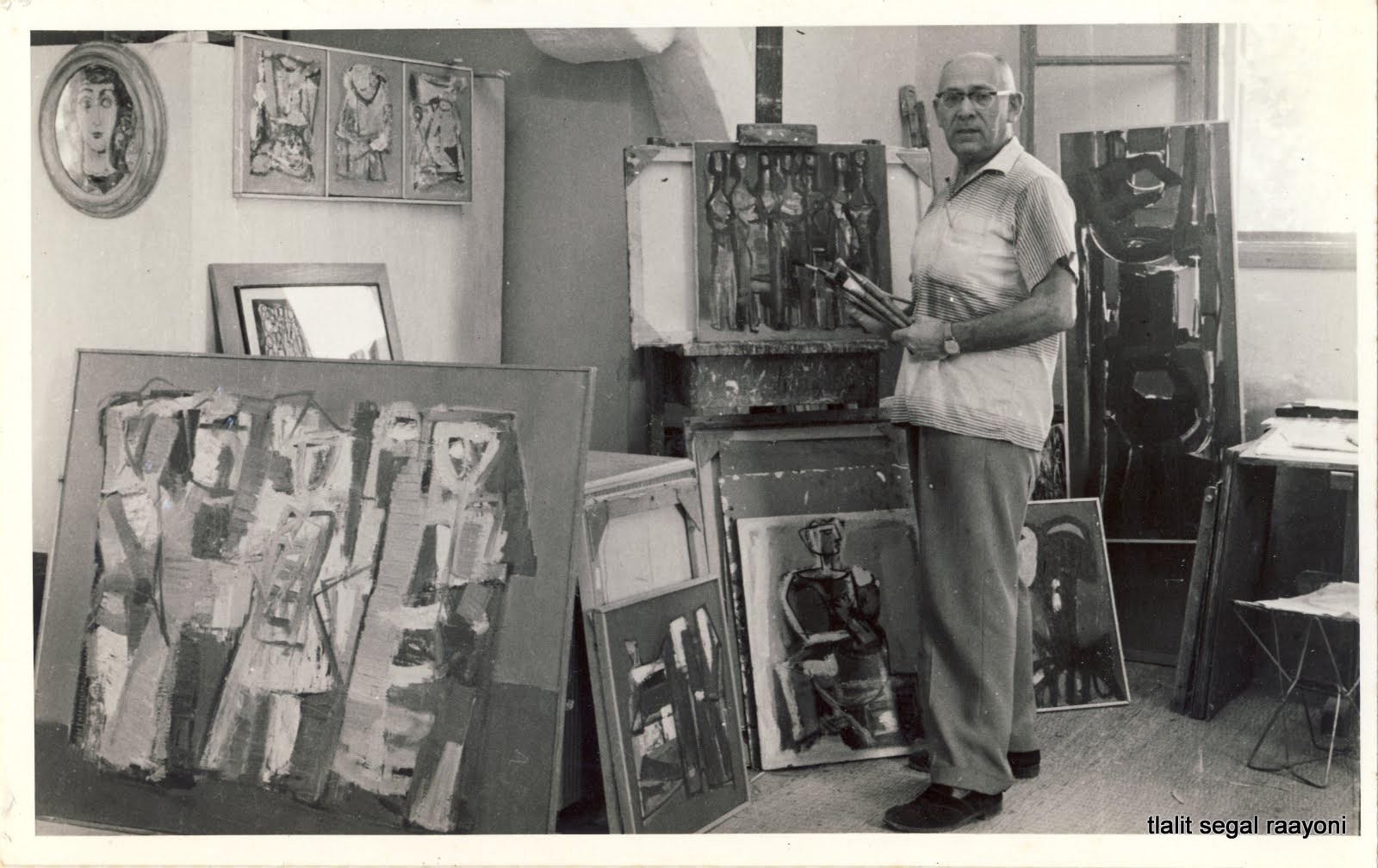
- Shmuel Raayoni in his studio, 1968
- Born: Shmuel Maslovati; May 4, 1905; Žiežmariai, Russian Empire
- Died: December 22, 1995 (aged 90); Ein-Hod, Israel
- Education: Bezalel School of Arts and Crafts
- Movement: Lyric Abstract, Ofakim Hadashim, Action Painting, Cubism
- Spouse: Ella Raayoni (ne: Ella Bartler)

Shmuel Raayoni (Hebrew: שמואל רעיוני; May 4, 1905 – December 22, 1995) was an Israeli painter, member of New Horizons, teacher and educator and founding member of Ein-Hod Artist Village.

== Biography ==
Shmuel Raayoni was born as Shmuel Maslovati in 1905 to a Zionist family in Žiežmariai – a town near Kaunas, then the capital of Lithuania. Encouraged by Boris Schatz, the founder of Bezalel, Raayoni immigrated to Palestine, alone, in 1923 and enrolled in the Bezalel School of Arts and Crafts. During those years, Aharon Avni, Arie Aroch, Moshe Castel Yehezkel Streichman, Avigdor Stematsky, and Zeev Ben-Zvi, studied there as well.

In 1927, Raayoni completed his studies at Bezalel and moved to the town of Petach Tikva where he worked at odd jobs, including teaching of painting. Among his students at that time was the painter Shlomo Eliraz.

In 1931, he moved to Haifa, where he began teaching painting at Bialik High School and later on at a teacher's seminar. In 1935 he married his former student, Ella Brettler, who later became a fabric collage artist. He changed his name to Raayoni around that period.

In 1939, at the same time he was teaching, Raayoni started to study architecture an engineering at the British Institute for Engineering Technology. Raayoni received his degree in Architecture and Engineering in 1945. He joined the General Union of Painters and Sculptors in Palestine in 1947, and immediately thereafter traveled, for the first time, to Paris. He studied at the Académie Julian, a private art school, where many foreign artists studied, since they were not required to take French language examinations. In 1955, Raayoni returned to Paris – this time enrolling at the Académie de la Grande Chaumière and subsequently he traveled to Italy.

Raayoni joined the Ofakim Hadashim group in 1952 where he became an active member. He participated in all the group's exhibitions, except the exhibition in Ein Harod Museum in July 1963. In 1953 he represented Israel at the Bienal in São Paulo, Brazil and in the Autumn Salon in Paris in 1958. Raayoni exhibited in Israel and abroad on occasion with his wife, the artist Ella Raayoni.

In 1953 Raayoni joined, as founding member, the artist village of Ein-Hod, where he lived with his family until his death in 1995.

== Raayoni’s work ==
Raayoni's early paintings, immediately after his graduation from Bezalel, are figurative, expressionistic and influenced by the European art of the period. Upon his return from Paris, he shows an exhibition of Paris and Haifa, his then home town, in watercolors making use of his famous bright colors and the Israeli light. The lessons that Raayoni learned from Georges Braque, Pablo Picasso, and Georges Rouault began to be apparent in his paintings. In the early 60's Raayoni started painting what was later coined as “lyric abstract”. He was also experimenting with a derivative of Action Painting, a painting technique introduced by the American painter Jackson Pollock. In this technique, an image is created by body movements without rational control. In the 70's and 80's came his “white period”. Raayoni created a series of scenery painting based on the landscapes of the Negev. In many of these paintings clusters of figures appear, serving as metaphor to the emotional world he wanted to represent. In later years his paintings were based on his impressions from his visit to the city of Goslar, Germany. In his late life he focused on painting figures.

Raayoni's body of work shifts between a variety of styles and techniques. Initially, as Batia Donner mentioned in her article about Raayoni, "it seemed to chart an evolutionary process that echoes cultural phenomena and trends that occurred at the heart of the Israeli art scene. However, at a certain moment, his paintings began to flit stylistically back and forth along the time axis, as he tried to identify the precise gesture that may best fit the meaning he sought to express"

== Awards and prizes ==
- 1948 - Herman Struck Award, Haifa Municipality
- 1958 - Malach Prize for print
- 1947 - First solo exhibition in Haifa
- 1949, 1953, 1955 - Artists House Haifa
- 1956, 1958 - Ein-Hod Art Gallery
- 1957 - Chagall House Haifa
- 1958 - Artists House Jerusalem
- 1958 - Marcel Bernheim Gallery Paris
- 1961 - Gallery 220 and Yehudit Gallery
- 1962 – El Paso Art Museum, Texas USA
- 1965 – Contemporary Art Museum Haifa
- 1965 - Woodstock Gallery London Great Britain
- 1965 - Jewish Community Center, Bridgeport, Connecticut, USA (together with his wife, Ella Raayoni)
- 1966, 1969, 1975,1979 - Nora Gallery Jerusalem
- 1967 – Yad Labanim Rehovot (together with his wife, Ella Raayoni)
- 1967 – Beit Haam Beer Sheva (together with his wife, Ella Raayoni)
- 1968 – Batte Wage Gallery Bazel, Switzerland
- 1969 - People in the Landscape, Aquarelle
- 1969 - 1977 Exhibitions in the US and Canada
- 1977 - Jewish Museum, Berkeley, California, USA
- 1980 - Yares Gallery Scottsdale, Arizona, USA (together with his wife, Ella Raayoni)
- 1983 - Chagall House, Association of Painters & Sculptors in Haifa
- 1984 - Portraits in Aquarelle, Nora Gallery Jerusalem
- 1990 - Human Faces, Ein-Hod Artist House
- 1992 - Flip it up flip it down, The Janco-dada Museum in Ein-Hod (together with his wife, Ella Raayoni)
- 1994, 2017 - Ein-Hod Art Gallery
- 2019 - Kfar Saba Municipal Gallery

== Biennial and group exhibitions ==
- 1953 - Biennial in São Paulo, Brazil
- 1958 - Autumn Salon, Paris France
- 1978 - Paintings from Israel, Artist Association House Paderborn, Germany
- 1987 - Israeli Art from Ein-Hod and Tel-Aviv, The Electorate of Trier, Germany

== Additional reading ==
- Ballas, Gila, New Horizons: The Birth of Abstraction in Israeli Art (Papyrus Publishing, Tel Aviv 1980, additional extended Edition: Modan Publishing, Ben Shemen 2014)

( Avniel, M., Hoenich, P.K. and Pomrok, M.B, Fifty Artists, Masada Press Ltd.
