= Ephraim Lifschitz =

Israeli painter

Ephraim Lifschitz אפרים ליפשיץ
- Ephraim Lifschitz
- Born: 1909; Stolin, Poland
- Died: 2004
- Education: Lviv National Academy of Arts
- Known for: Painting
- Movement: Israeli art

Ephraim Lifschitz (Hebrew: אפרים ליפשיץ) is an Israeli painter, born 1909, Stolin, Poland and died 2004.

== Biography ==
Ephraim Lifshitz was born in Stolin, Poland, in 1909 to a religious family of 12 children. Lifshitz studied at Hadar and the Tarbut school. After graduating, Lifshitz was active in Zionist settings in the town and worked as a self-taught painter. Between 1935 and 1933 he lived in Paris, France, then in 1935 immigrated to the Land of Israel and settled in Tel Aviv where he helped in building the "Ohel" theater. In 1937 he joined the Haganah organization, and during the War of Independence was drafted into the IDF on behalf of the Haganah. In 1944 he studied painting with Aharon Avni, and between 1948 and 1945 studied painting in the studio of Yehezkel Streichman and Avigdor Stematsky in Tel Aviv.

In 1951, Lifshitz was one of the founders of the "Enrichment Group" exhibiting at all its exhibitions. Between 1974-1952 he worked at Bank Hapoalim. In 1953 he was one of the founders of the artists 'village in Ein Hod and in 1970 he joined the artists' campus in Safed and even served as chairman of the campus. In 1964 he presented together with the "Observation" group.

Lifshitz's early works, before immigrating to Eretz Israel, had not been preserved, consisting of decorative works, backdrops, figurative watercolor paintings and more. Gaining popularity, Lifshitz changed the style of his painting, which became expressive with influence from the works of the "Paris School". During the 1950s, his works show the influence of the New Horizon group. His works contained depictions of landscapes and interiors made with free brushstrokes, the use of contour lines and the use of decorative forms. The series of paintings "Ein Gedi", from the 1960s, is made as an abstraction of nature made with the help of a network of colored lines. In the late 1990s, following a car accident, he switched to painting in pastel chalks.

== Awards and recognition ==
- 1958 Dizengoff Prize
- 1968 The Histadrut Prize
- 1988 The Nahum Gutman Prize for Painting and Sculpture, The Histadrut Labor Federation

== Education ==
- 1938-41 Graduated Lvov Government Institute of Plastic Art, U.S.S.R.
- 1945-48 With Avigdor Stematsky, Aharon Avni, "The Studio", Tel Aviv, Israel

== See also ==
- Visual arts in Israel
