= Ronit Matalon =

Israeli author

- רונית מטלון
- Born: Ronit Matalon; 25 May 1959; Ganei Tikva, Israel
- Died: 28 December 2017 (aged 58); Haifa, Israel
- Occupation: Author
- Writing career
- Language: Hebrew

Ronit Matalon (Hebrew: רונית מטלון; May 25, 1959 – December 28, 2017) was an Israeli fiction writer.

== Biography ==
Ronit Matalon was born in Ganei Tikva, Israel, the daughter of Egyptian Jewish immigrants. Matalon studied literature and philosophy at Tel Aviv University and worked as a journalist for Haaretz newspaper, where she covered Gaza and the West Bank between 1987 and 1993. She was a resident of Haifa and taught literature at the University of Haifa. She also taught at the Camera Obscura school for the Arts in Tel Aviv.

Matalon was also a liberal social activist, and participated in demonstrations organized by the Association for Civil Rights in Israel. She was a member of the Art and Culture Council of the Ministry of Education, and the Forum for Mediterranean Culture at the Van Leer Institute. In 2003, she was a co-petitioner to the Supreme Court of Israel to investigate the assassination of Salah Shehade.

== Awards and recognition ==
- 1994 – Prime Minister's Prize for Hebrew Literary Works
- 2009 – Bernstein Prize (original Hebrew novel category), for her novel "The Sound of Our Steps".
- 2010 – Neuman prize, a literary prize given by Bar-Ilan University.
- 2010 – Honorary Ph.D. from the Hebrew University of Jerusalem on June 6, 2010 for her contributions to literature and for her social activism.
- 2016 – The EMET Prize for Art, Science and Culture (in Hebrew literature)
- 2017 – Brenner Prize for her novel, And the Bride Closed the Door (2016)

== Novels ==
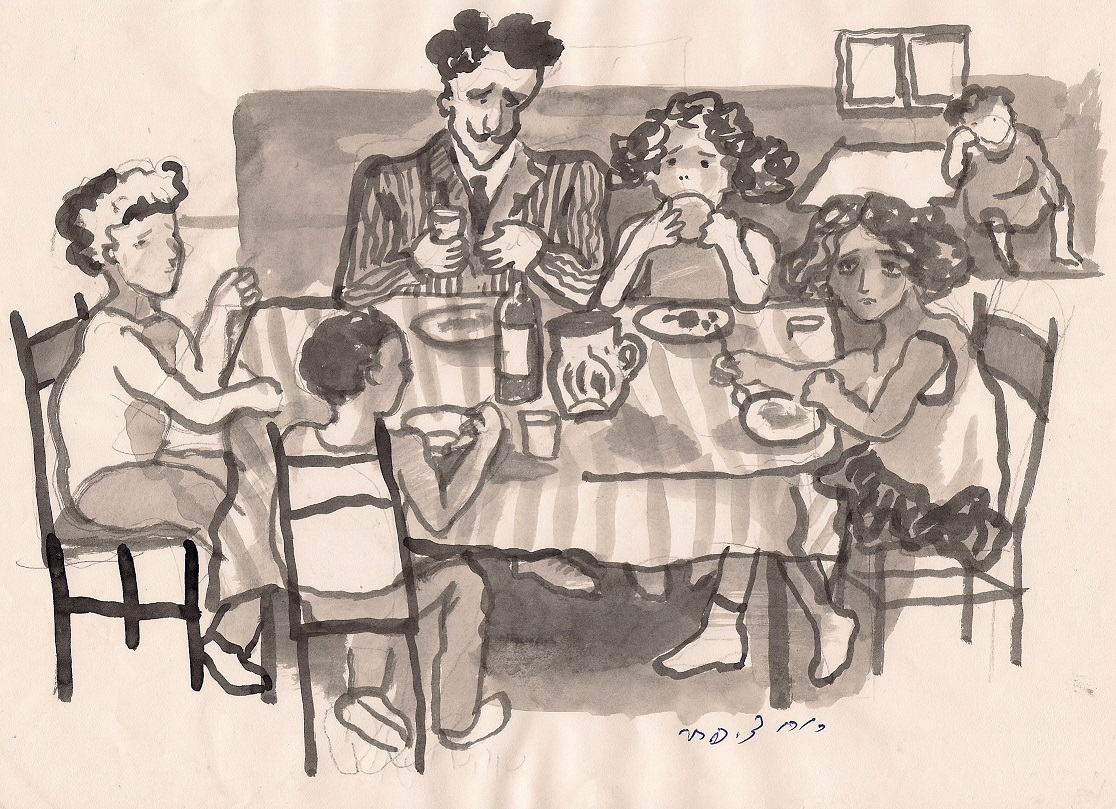
An illustration by Ruth Zarfati for the book A Story that Begins with a Snake's Funeral

- Strangers at Home (1992)
- A Story that Begins with a Snake's Funeral (1994, children's book)
- The One Facing Us (1995)
- Sarah Sarah (2000)
- Reading and Writing (2001)
- Bliss (2003)
- Uncover Her Face (2005)
- The Sound of Our Steps (2008)
- And the Bride Closed the Door (2016) Keter

== Articles ==
- "Weddings and Anti-Weddings", Haaretz, 2008
