= Chaim Nahor =

Jewish Israeli artist

- חיים נהור
- Born: 1914; Poland
- Died: 1993 (aged 78–79); Tzfat, Israel
- Other name: Haim Nahor
- Occupation: artist
- Known for: Lithographs, oil painting, landscape, Bezalel Academy of Art & Design, Jerusalem
- Awards: See Honors and awards

Chaim Nahor (Hebrew: חיים נהור; 1914–1993) was a Jewish Israeli artist specializing in abstract art, printing, landscapes and murals. He was part of the developing art coloney in Tzfat. He was associated with Aharon Avni, Steinhardt and Edward Matuschak.

== Early life and migration to Israel ==
Nahor was born in Poland. When he was one, his family moved to Germany. They later moved to Israel and escaped the Final Solution, spending time in Tel Aviv, Jerusalem and Tzfat.

In Tel Aviv he worked as a graphic designer and married until 1947 when he relocated to Jerusalem. He remarried and lived with his wife, Ruth, and lived many years between Haifa and Tzfat in the north of Israel.

== Career ==
Despite being trained in the arts informally, Nahor worked as a professor of the arts in Bezalel Academy of Art & Design, Jerusalem. He wrote and contributed to many texts and picture books on the arts, including stone, wood, oil, water (sculpture and painting): Sy Gresser, Leon Bibel, Paul Fux, Chaim Nahor, B'nai B'rith Klutznick National Jewish Museum.

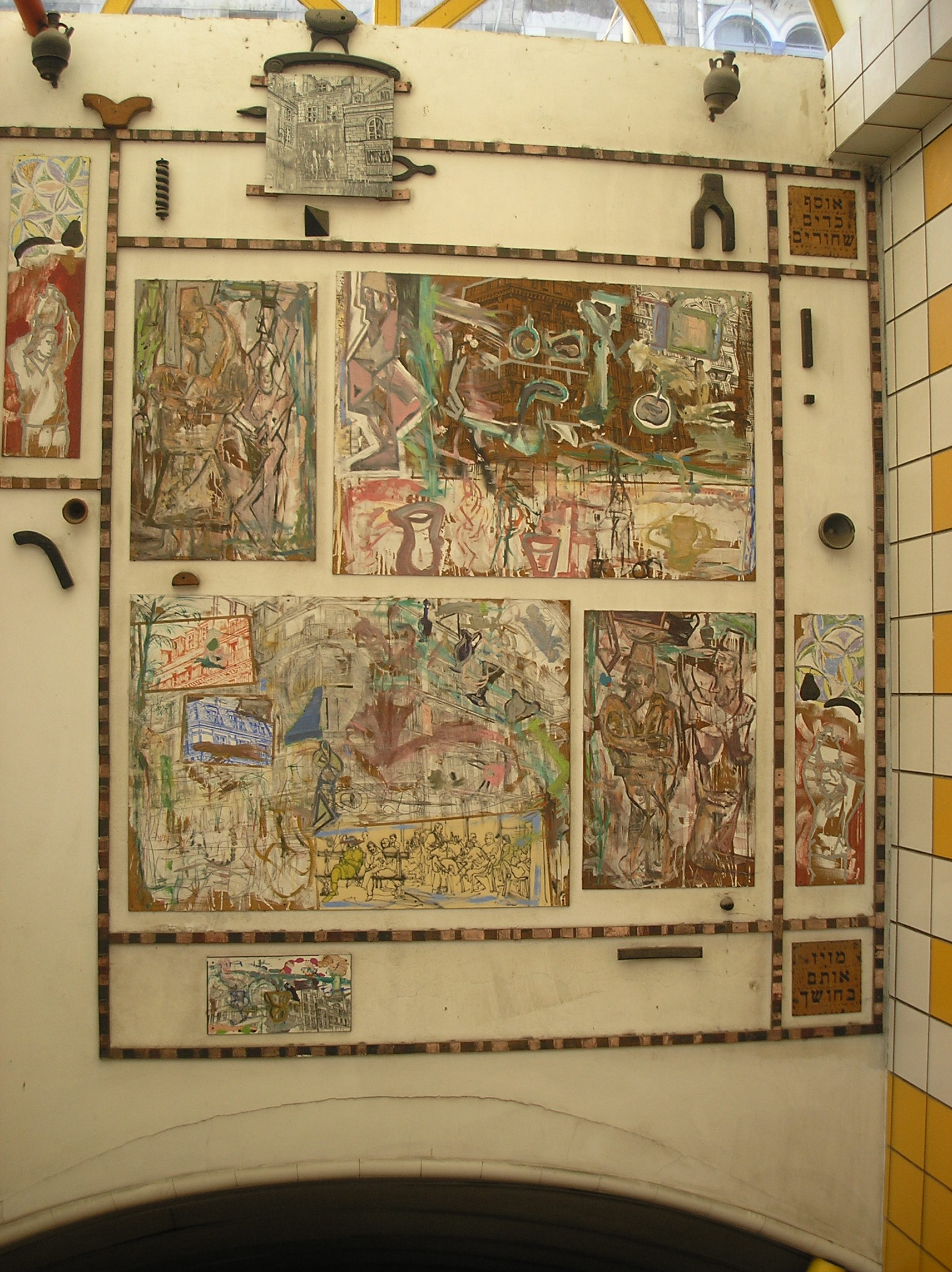
Carmelit Underground Train mural, Haifa

In 1959, Nahor won the first place commission for the mural of the Carmelit Underground Train, Haifa.

== Painting philosophy ==
Nahor was focused on the use of landscape to give motion, which he interpreted as giving a composition life. He was quoted as saying "You see it--you feel it! That is the way it must be. In any art there must be movement or it becomes static--dead."

== Works ==
Much of Nahor's work can be found in Tzfat and general exhibition, and is displayed around the world.

In 1966 he was exhibited at the Museum of Modern Art in Haifa. The successful exhibit was displayed with works by sculptor Aharon Ashkenazi.

== Exhibitions ==
- 1993 B'nai B'rith Klutznick Museum
