= Aharon Avni =

Israeli painter (1906–1951)

- אהרן אבני
- Born: 27 November 1906; Yekaterinoslav, Russian Empire
- Died: 23 March 1951 (aged 44); Tel Aviv, Israel
- Education: Moscow School of Painting, Sculpture and Architecture, Bezalel, Histadrut Art Studio under Yitzhak Frenkel, Technion Faculty of Architecture, Académie de la Grande Chaumière
- Known for: Painting
- Style: Figurative, Expressionism
- Movement: Jewish School Of Paris
- Spouse: Chaya Sandelerman
- Awards: Dizengoff Prize 1937, 1948

Aharon Avni (Kaminkovitz) (Hebrew: אהרן אבני; November 27, 1906 – March 23, 1951) was an Israeli painter, born in Russia, a member of the 'Massad' group, founder of the 'Avni Institute,' and one of the founders of the HaMidrasha For the arts.

== Life ==
=== Early life ===
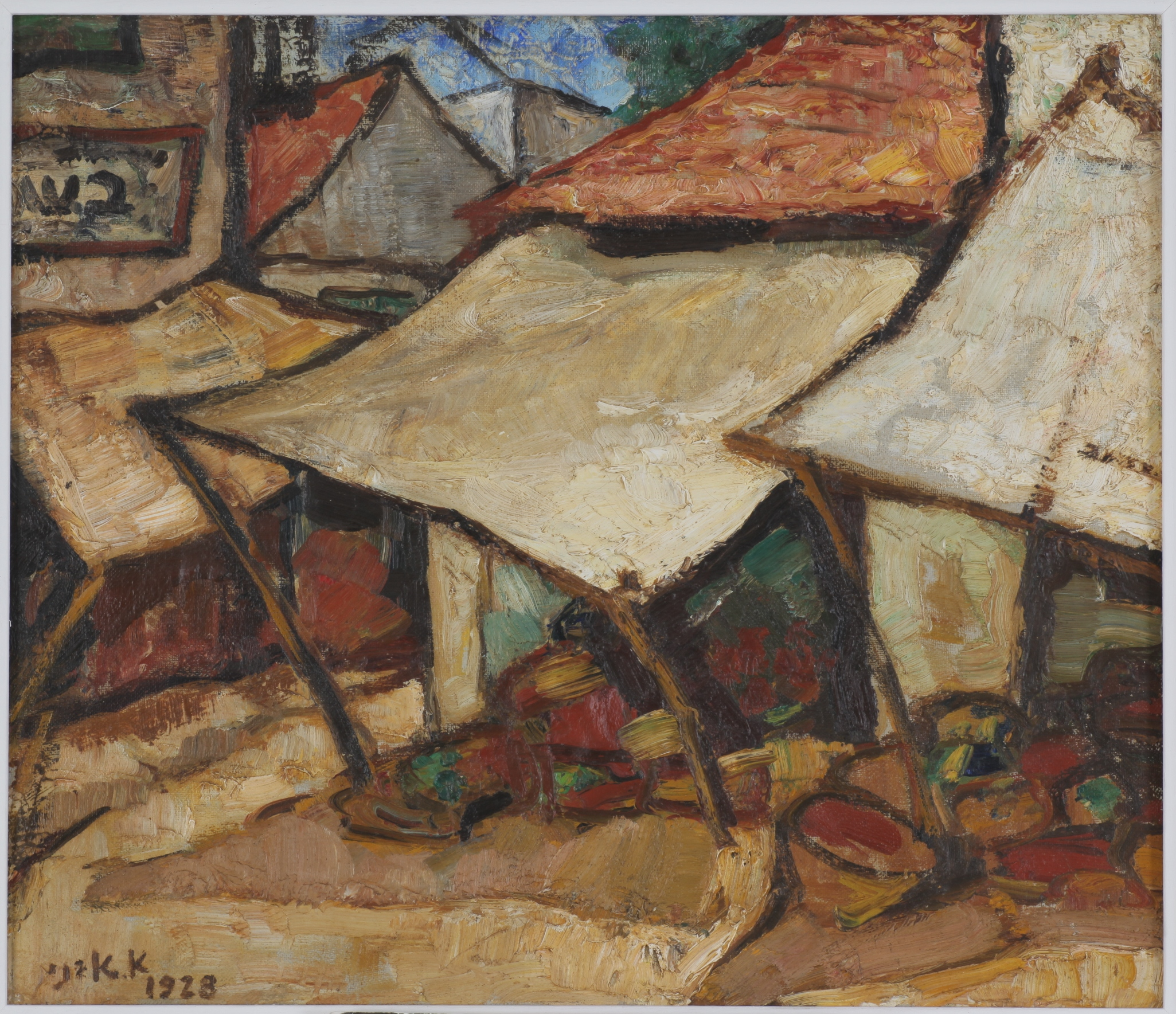
The Market in Haifa, 1928

He was born in 1906 in Yekaterinoslav, Russia. His father, Michael-David, was a renowned engineer and an enthusiastic Zionist who was the son-in-law of Rabbi Chaim Berlin. His mother, Esther Hadassah, was a painter and poet, the daughter of Jacob and Sarah Pachmoutski. His grandmother Sarah was the wife of Rabbi Chaim Berlin, the Av Beit Din of Moscow.

In his youth, Avni studied at the "Cheder" and the "Yeshiva," and he even received ordination for teaching. At the age of 12, Avni lost his mother. He studied at the Hebrew Gymnasium in his hometown under the educator and ideologue Pinchas Shifman (Ben-Sira) and enriched his knowledge of the Hebrew language under Abraham Shlonsky.

=== Education in Pre-Independence Israel ===
In 1923, Avni began studying at the Moscow Academy of Fine Arts. Around the same time, he joined the "HeHalutz" group, and as part of it, he immigrated to the Land of Israel in 1925. Avni joined "HaGdud HaAvoda" (The Labor Battalion) and was one of the founders of the "Socialist Choices," "HaNoar HaOved" (The Working Youth), and "HaPoel" movements.

After his Aliya, he settled in Jerusalem and began his studied in "Bezalel," Jerusalem, where he studied between the years 1925–1928. Due to disagreements with the school's director, Boris Schatz, Avni was dismissed from Bezalel in 1928. During the weekends Avni continued his education in the Histadrut Art Studio, under the Ecole de Paris artists, Isaac Frenkel Frenel in Tel Aviv to which he relocated to in 1929. He studied architecture and draftsmanship in the Technion Faculty of Architecture between 1928 and 1930. In 1930, he married Chaya Sandelerman, a native of Ukraine. In the same year, he held his first solo exhibition in Tel Aviv at the "Herzliya Hebrew Gymnasium" and in the home of engineer M. Kaslman.

=== In Paris ===
Following Isaac Frenkel's (his teacher) advice, he and other students of Frenkel left for Paris where they continued their studies. Between 1930 and 1932, Avni lived in Paris, where he studied at the "Grand Chaumière" academy. Upon his return in 1932, he began working as an architect for the municipality of Jaffa, gave lectures in architecture at the Technion, and taught mathematics at the school of Kibbutz Givat Hashlosha. In 1938, he started teaching painting and art history at the "New High School" in Tel Aviv.

== Exhibitions ==
Between 1929 and 1930, Avni exhibited for the first time with a group of young artists, the majority former students of Frenkel in the Histadrut Art studio. They called their group, "Masad". In the group were several notable artists such as Avigdor Stematsky, Arie Aroch, Tzvi Shor, Joseph Kossonogi, David Hendler, Mordechai Levanon, and Israel Paldi. They saw themselves as representing the young generation of Israeli artists. They positioned themselves in contrast to the "Agudah", another art group's exhibition, where artists like Nahum Gutman, Reuven Rubin, Siona Tagger, and others were featured.

Avni's works were exhibited in museums and galleries throughout the country. In 1936, his first solo exhibition opened at the Tel Aviv Museum. In 1938, he exhibited at the National Home for Disabled Soldiers in Bezalel. In 1940, another exhibition took place at the Katz Art Gallery. In 1944, there was another solo exhibition at the Tel Aviv Museum, and in 1950, he exhibited at the Ben-Zvi Gallery in Paris. Avni was awarded the Dizengoff Prize twice, in 1937 and 1948.

A retrospective exhibition of Avni's art was shown at the Herzliya Museum of Contemporary Art by the curator Ron Bartosch in 2021.

== Role in education ==
=== The Avni Institute of Art and Design ===
In 1936, Avni founded "The Studio" ("HaStudio LeTziur uFisul"), a studio for painting and sculpture next to the Cultural Committee of the Workers' Council of Tel Aviv. Avni managed the studio until his death. Following his passing in 1951, the institution's name was changed to the "Avni Institute" ("Machon Avni"). The Studio was located in the basement of the Workers' Hostel on Pinsker Street, corner of Dizengoff Street. The basement was very small, and the painting department later moved to Gordon Street, corner of Dizengoff Street.

The initial instructors included Avni as the director and head of the painting department, teaching also the history of art from the Renaissance to the modern era. Moshe Sternschuss was the head of the sculpture department, Yaakov Steinhardt taught drawing, Yerachmiel Schachter taught graphics, and Professor Joshua Shor taught art history. Ezekiel Streichman, who was later added by Avni in 1943 to teach painting, left after two years and joined Avigdor Stematsky in establishing a separate "Studio."

In 1946, Avni, together with educator Eliyahu Bils, founded the Teachers' Seminary for Painting in Tel Aviv (later operated in Ramat Hasharon). The purpose was to teach painting and pedagogy, but Avni passed away some time later due to cancer and was buried in the Nachlat Yitzhak cemetery.

=== His students ===
Many artists and creators studied at Avni's studio, including Dan Eitan, Yechiel (Chilik) Arad, Michael Argov, Amos Arikha, Bella Brisel, Siona Shimshi (Baram), Tzipora Brenner, Eliyahu Gat, David Danon, Tzvi Dekel, Nahum Zolotov, Klier Yaniv, Yitzhak (Ika) Israeli, Dov Lif (Lifinsky), Ephraim Lifshitz, David Len-Bar, Tzvi Milstein, Lea Nikel, Aryeh Sartani, Moshe Proops, Yosef Parichi, Esther Peretz (Ard), Shimon Tzabar, Ruth Zarfati (Sternschuss), Menashe Kadishman, Dan Kedar, Rafi Kaiser, Danny Karavan, Buky Schwartz, Shlomo Schwartz, and Zvi Tadmor.

== Avni's artistic style ==
Throughout his artistic career, Avni remained loyal to figurative painting. He was influenced by his teacher, Frenkel who taught of modern art trends in Paris and of Post-Impressionism. He drew inspiration from trends in French art, initially influenced by Corot and Gustave Courbet. Later on, his works began to show the influence of painters from the Jewish School of Paris such as Soutine, Frenel, Chagall, Pascin and others. His paintings from the 1930s are characterized by dark colors in the spirit of the Jewish School of Paris. Toward the end of the 1940s, his color palate started to clarify, becoming bolder and more expressive.

== Books ==
- Episodes in the History of French art in the 11th century, publisher: Avni Institute, Tel Aviv, 1940.

== See also ==
- Avigdor Stematsky
- Yitzhak Frenkel Frenel
