= Mordechai Avniel =

Israeli artist

Mordecai Avniel
- מרדכי אבניאל
- Born: Mordecai Dickstein; 1900; Parychy, Minsk Governorate, Russian Empire (now Belarus)
- Died: 1989 (aged 88–89); Haifa, Israel
- Education: Yekaterinburg, Russia (1913–19); Bezalel Academy of Arts and Design, Jerusalem (1923)
- Occupations: Painter; Sculptor; Lawyer
- Awards: Herman Struck Prize (1952); Tenth Anniversary Prize for Watercolours, Ramat Gan (1958); Histadrut Prize (1961); First Prize Haifa Municipality (1977)

Mordechai Avniel (Hebrew: מרדכי אבניאל; 1900–1989), variant name Mordecai Avniel, was an Israeli painter, sculptor and lawyer.

== Biography ==
Mordecai Dickstein (later Avniel) was born in 1900 in Parychy, in the Minsk Governorate of the Russian Empire (present-day Belarus). He studied fine arts in Yekaterinburg, Russia (1913–19) and at the Bezalel Academy of Art and Design, Jerusalem (1923). Avniel immigrated to Palestine in 1921 where he first worked as a pioneer in citrus plantations near Petah Tikva. In 1923, at the urging of Boris Schatz, he went to Jerusalem to further his art studies at Bezalel. He later taught painting and sculpture at the school, and served a term as director of the Small Sculpture Section of the Sculpture Department (1924–28). From 1935 on, Avniel lived in Haifa. Avniel was also a lawyer and a founding partner of the Haifa firm Avniel, Salomon & Company.

== Art career ==
Avniel regularly showed his work in group exhibitions of the Painters and Sculptors' Association of Israel. He was awarded the Herman Struck Prize (1952), Tenth Anniversary Prize for Watercolours, Ramat Gan (1958), Histadrut Prize (1961), and First Prize Haifa Municipality (1977). He represented Israel at the 1958 Venice Biennale and the 1962 International Art Seminar at Fairleigh Dickinson University. Avniel was a member of the Artists' Colony in Safed and maintained a studio on Mount Carmel.

== Artistic style ==
Avniel is best known for his landscape paintings. He said of his scenes of Israel: "I loved the Israeli landscape. While roaming the country extensively, I gradually absorbed its atmosphere, its lights and moods, the view of mountains and valleys, the Sea of Galilee and the expanse of the Mediterranean. Again and again, I experimented painting and drawing them, at the same time trying to teach myself contemporary art. And thus I gradually shook off the academic conception, and became freer. I tried with my whole being to find my own style. The clouds floating above the Galilee or the Dead Sea - both below sea level - bring about an almost constant change of light, colour and atmosphere. The scenery takes on certain shapes and discards them again. These clouds taught me to understand space. I do not see my landscapes optically; they are a fusion of colours blended harmoniously - abstract at times, and at other times expressions of my inner feelings. Only after years did I find self-expression in my landscape, in the light, the atmosphere and the sun of Israel. My motif is always the non-static landscape with all its contrasts: the rays of dawn, the stillness of the day's heat, the evening's twilight, radiance and dimness, wind and rain, a night's storm."

Avniel's manipulations of light and colour share much with those of compatriot artists Shimshon Holzman and Joseph Kossonogi.

== Selected exhibitions ==
- 2004: Our Landscape: Notes on Landscape Painting in Israel, University of Haifa Art Gallery, Haifa (online catalogue)
- 1965: Mordechai Avniel Retrospective, Haifa Municipality Museum of Modern Art, Haifa
- 1964: Galerie Synthèse, Paris
- 1962: New York University, New York
- 1961: Rina Gallery of Modern Art, Jerusalem
- 1960: Galerie Intime, Montréal
- 1959: Opening Show, Gallery Moos, Toronto (with Pablo Picasso, Serge Poliakoff, Marc Chagall, Hans Erni and Paul-Émile Borduas) (1959 gallery invitation).
- 1959: Pulitzer Art Galleries, New York
- 1957: Chemerinsky Gallery, Tel Aviv
- 1956: Museum of Modern Art, Haifa
- 1955: Nora Gallery, Jerusalem
- 1954: Tel Aviv Museum, Tel Aviv
- 1954: National Museum, Washington
- 1953: Shore Gallery, Boston
- 1952: Katz Gallery, Tel Aviv
- 1941: Beit Pevsner, Haifa

== Selected collections ==
- Haifa museum of Art
- Tel Aviv Museum
- Israel Museum, Jerusalem
- Boston Public Library
- Brooklyn Museum
- Fogg Art Museum, Cambridge
- Hartford Atheneum
- Metropolitan Museum of Art, New York
- Museum of Fine Arts, Boston
- Museum of Modern Art, New York
- Smithsonian Institution, Washington DC
- New York Public Library
- Philadelphia Museum of Art
- Baltimore Museum of Art
- Carnegie Institute of Fine Arts, Pittsburgh
- Fine Arts Museums of San Francisco

== Catalogues ==
- Ayal, Avishay, and Yoram Bar-Gal. Our Landscape: Notes on Landscape Painting in Israel [exhibition catalogue]. Haifa: University of Haifa Art Gallery, 2004.
- Jaffé, Hans Ludwig. Sea of Galilee: Watercolors [portfolio of colour plates]. Tel Aviv: M. Avniel, 1963.
- Mordechai Avniel: The Israeli Landscape Painter [catalogue]. Tel Aviv: United Artists, [1966].
- Mordecai Avniel: Retrospective Exhibition, November–December 1965 [exhibition catalogue]. Haifa: Museum of Modern Art, 1965.
- Tadmor, Gabriel (ed). Mordecai Avniel: Paintings, Woodcuts, Small Sculptures [portfolio]. Haifa: M. Avniel, [197-?].
- Twelve Israeli Painters [portfolio of colour plates]. Tel Aviv: Lion Printers, 1965.
