= Ruth Zarfati =

Israeli painter, sculptor and illustrator

Ruth Zarfati-Sternschuss (Hebrew: רות צרפתי-שטרנשוס; born in April 17, 1928 – deceased February 27, 2010) was an Israeli painter, sculptor and illustrator. She was a member of the Ofakim Hadashim art movement.

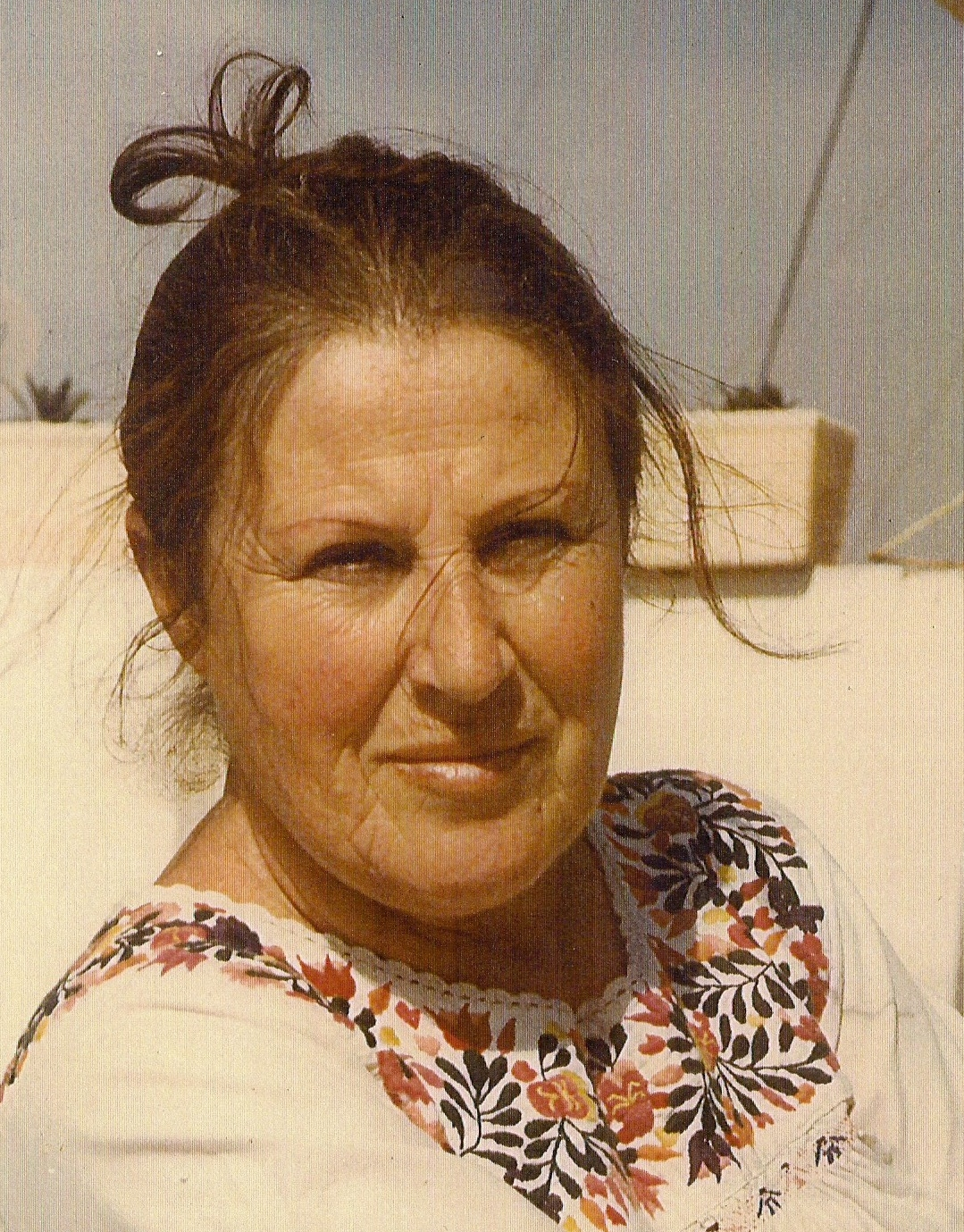
Ruth Zarfati

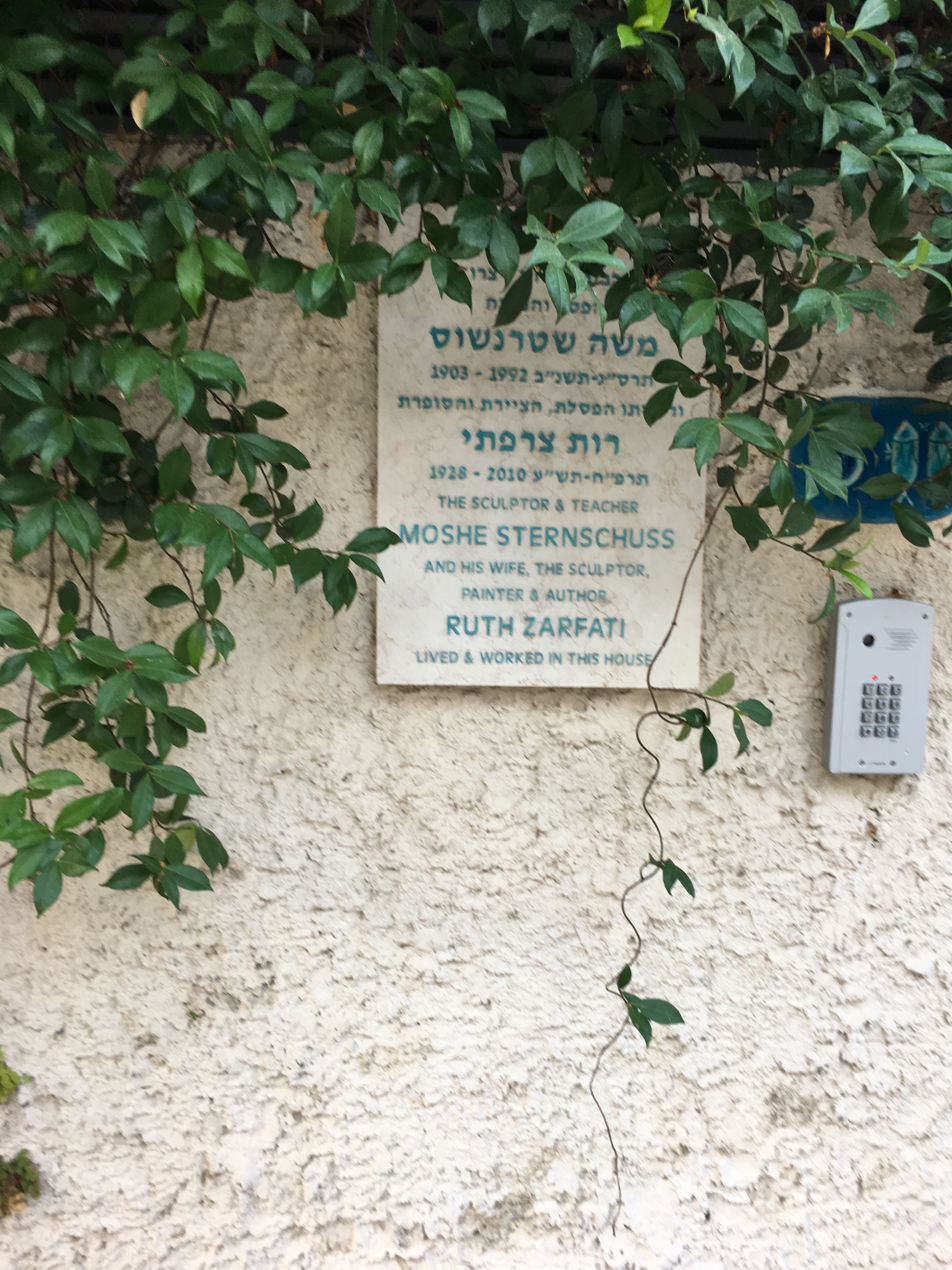
Memorial plaque for artists Moshe Sternschuss and Ruth Zarfati, located outside Birnboim 6 Street, Tel Aviv.

== Biography ==
Ruth Zarfati was born in Petah Tikva and attended Ahad Ha'am school in the city. Her father, Yehuda Zarfati, one of the first employees of the Electric Company who helped to organize the electricity network in Petah Tikva, taught her to paint according to the rules of academic painting and cultivated in her a love of art. As a hobby, he sculpted, painted and designed toys.

In 1941–1945, in parallel with her studies at the "New High School,” Zarfati took art lessons with the painter Aharon Avni at what later became the Avni Institute. In 1945, after graduating high school and before her IDF enlistment, she became a student of sculptor Moshe Sternschuss (1903–1992), whom she married in 1949.

In 1958, the couple's only child was born. Five years later, the family moved to Tel Aviv.

Over the years, Zarfati participated in about 90 exhibitions, including 23 solo exhibitions, and won 14 awards and commendation marks for her work.

== Works ==
=== Sculpture ===
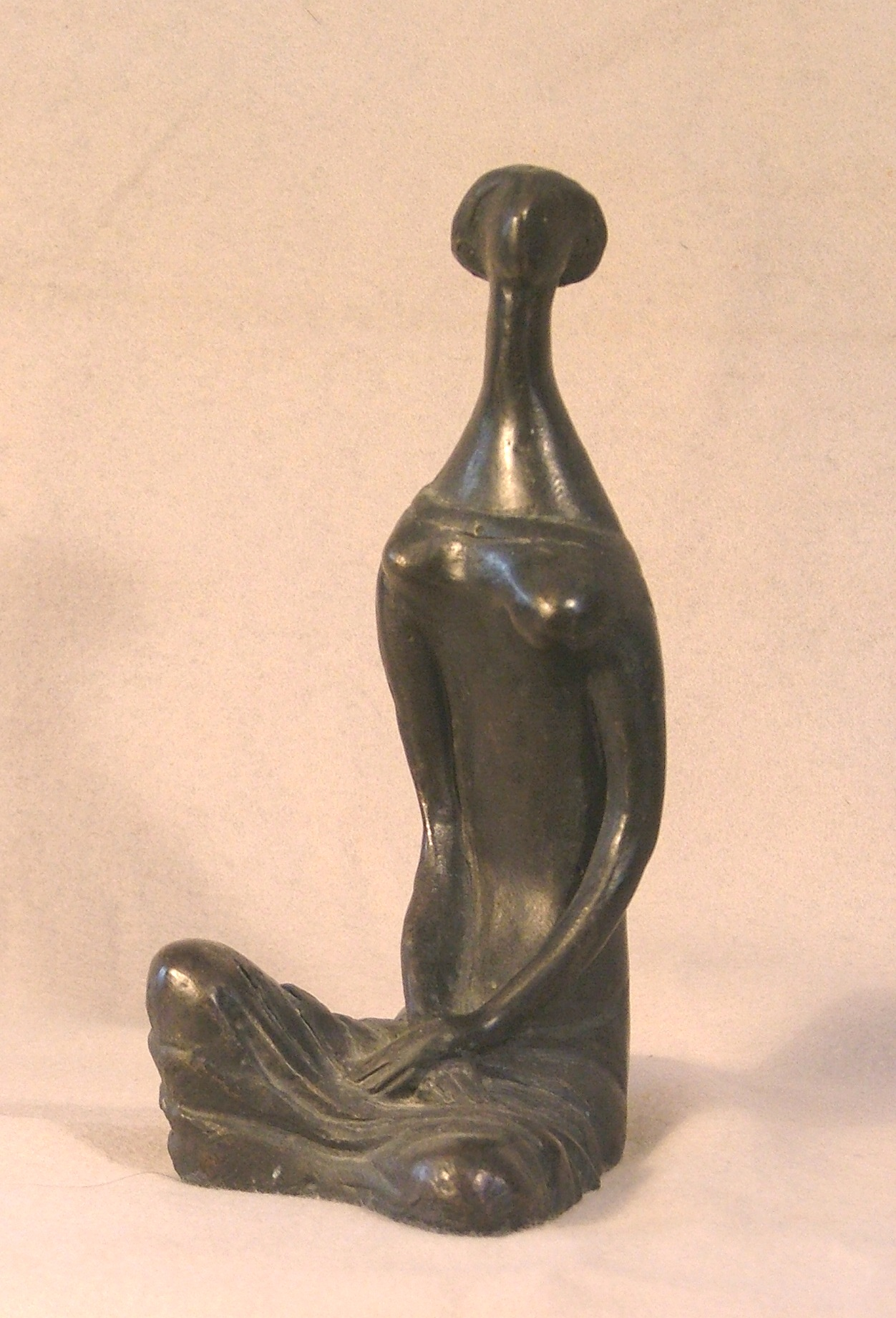
Seated girl, Ruth Zarfati

Sculptor Moshe Sternschuss continued to guide Zarfati throughout their marriage and gave her the principles of the formal and plastic design of modern sculpture. Sternschuss was one of the pioneers of modernist sculpture and one of the first creators of abstract sculpture in Israel. He focused on developing the values and structure of the sculpted figure in the spirit of modern art, and freeing them from dependence on the real image. His students included Menashe Kadishman, Benni Efrat and Buky Schwartz.

After studying, Zarfati chose sculpture as her main medium, remarking, "Sculpture is the most serious thing I have,” at the opening of her exhibition at the Klatchkin Gallery. Throughout her artistic career, Zarfati continued to focus on sculpture, but did not abandon painting. In the late 1940s, she began to formulate her personal artistic style, making a name for herself as an independent and original artist. In 1949, she and husband Moshe Sternschuss joined the New Horizons group, an association inspired by the European artistic avant-garde movement that sought to promote the creation of modern art in the country. Zarfati, the only woman and also the youngest in the group, only 21 years old, was a member of the association's committee and participated in most of the group's exhibitions presented from 1949 to 1959. While maintaining her personal character, she remained faithful throughout her years of artistry to the heritage of figurative sculpture and its main subject - the human figure. From the very beginning, the young artist's works attracted the attention of Haim Gamzu. She was the only sculptor whose work was included in his book on painting and sculpture in Israel, and he remained a loyal fan of her work in the years that followed.

Zarfati's sculptural work includes a variety of themes; Babies and children, figures of girls and women, torso sculptures, portraits and more. The baby sculptures of Ruth Tzarfati are a division of unique importance in the entirety of her work, "unparalleled in Israeli sculpture," Professor Avraham Ronen remarked. The baby sculptures first appeared in the late fifties after the birth of her daughter Hagit, at The 35th Venice International Art Festival in 1970. In 1975, she presented female torso sculptures inspired by the remains of ancient Greek sculptures in a solo exhibition at the Tel Aviv Museum.

In later years, baby sculptures appeared again, depicting the artist's grandchildren: Tal (born 1986) and Tom (born 1995). These sculptures emphasize the combination of the erupting vitality of the little creature and the clumsiness of its movements. Her sculpture "The Baby,” in the collection of the Tel Aviv Museum, is one of her most highly regarded works.

=== Painting ===
Although sculpture became her main creative medium, Zarfati continued to work as a painter until the end of her life. Her artistic legacy includes hundreds of paintings and drawings, only a small fraction of which have been exhibited. Zarfati's paintings focus on pure artistic qualities - in structure and composition, in drawing, and in a rich color palette. Almost all of the Zarfati's paintings were made in watercolor or colored pencils on modest sheets of paper, pages of workbooks and notebooks.

Watercolor landscape paintings constitute the largest portion of her paintings and most of them are the result of her impressions of the sites she visited in Israel and abroad. During her visit to Greece, she was particularly fascinated by the white village houses and their courtyards. Some of the paintings from 2000 to 2001 depict the landscapes of the Yarkon Park, and in her later years she often painted imaginative landscapes.

Zarfati's paintings also include a large collection of portraits of family and friends painted in watercolors, pastels and colored pencils.

=== Drawings ===
Zarfati is considered one of Israel's top illustrators. She illustrated 70 books, most of them children's and youth books, some of which she herself penned. Autobiographical passages unfold in the book “One Chapter of Dad's Life and He the Kindergarten,” and stories about her family members appear in the children's book “The End of the Tiger Nerd.” She expressed her love for Greece and the impressions of her trip there in the book “To the Island of the Cats in Greece,” and she wrote about her pets in "Sensual", the first book she wrote and illustrated, and "Givat Shmink." “A Carpathian Journey to the Big City” was the last book she wrote and illustrated.

Her first illustrations were for a book by Haim Hazaz. In 2004, a “story garden” was inaugurated in the city of Holon, where Zarfati set up a colorful procession of large figures from “Dodi Simcha.” It was the artist's last major sculptural project.

Zarfati reiterated that her illustrations are paintings for everything. Indeed, in the title pages of the books there are no references to illustrations; only paintings are mentioned in them. Her book paintings were made in a wide variety of techniques and styles. These ranged from linear drawings of an illustrative nature, to colorful paintings that are close in spirit to landscape paintings, and her character paintings, similar to Jehoash Bieber's 1988 “Parasols on the Street of Prophets.”

=== Design ===
At the beginning of her career, Zarfati exhibited ceramic jewelry at the Triennale for the Craft of Thought in Milan alongside Salvador Dalí and Chilida. There she won the silver medal for design. The zodiac signs in Old Jaffa made of glazed ceramics are her work.

Zarfati created puppets and dolls inspired by her father's work: “Dad's toys strengthened my tendency to make dolls. These dolls also greatly influenced my sculptural subjects, to the point of blurring areas between them.” Twenty of her brightly colored doll sculptures were shown at the Israel pavilion at the Expo exhibition in Montreal, Canada. Some became part of the permanent exhibit at Beit Ariela Library in Tel Aviv. Zarfati also created textile designs for Maskit and Gottex, and designed costumes for the Inbal Dance Theater.

== Commemoration ==
The Holon Children's Museum has a wing named for her and displays dolls she designed and those she collected.
