= David Danon =

Israeli physician

Professor David Danon (Hebrew: דוד דנון; October 17, 1921 – October 17, 2015) was a physician, a scientist, a leader in the study of the biology of aging, and a painter. He was the inventor of a unique treatment for the healing of pressure ulcers and other severe wounds that do not respond to conventional treatments. Before the creation of the state of Israel, he was a commander in Irgun, the Zionist paramilitary group also known as "Etzel". He was the founder and the first commander of the Israeli Air Force's first airborne military medical evacuation unit, the founder and first president of the Israeli Association for Electron Microscopy, director of the Gerontology Center at the Weizmann Institute of Science, and Chief Scientist of the Israeli Ministry of Health.

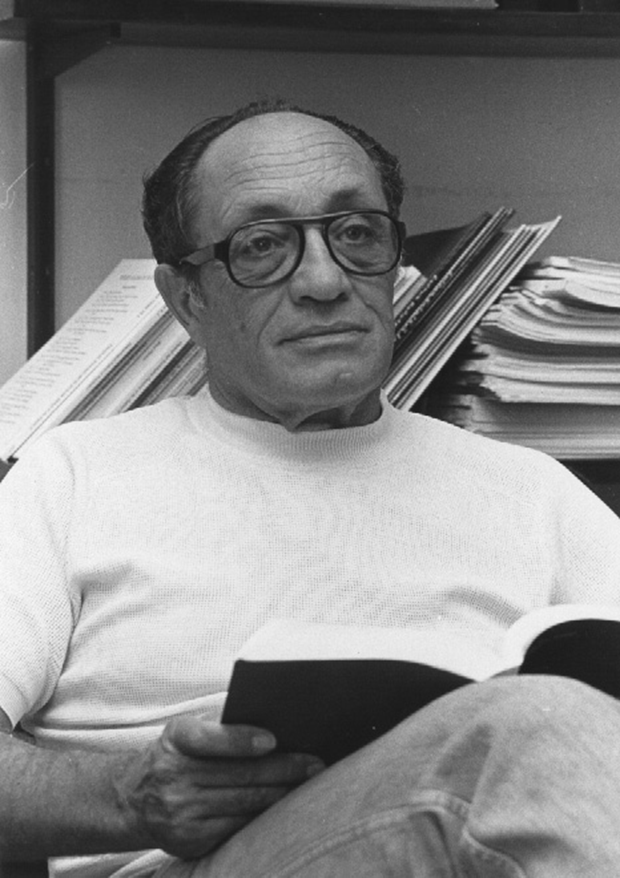
Prof. David Danon in Weizmann Institute of Science

== Childhood and youth ==
David Danon was born in 1921 in Bulgaria. He emigrated to Israel in 1924.

== Irgun activity ==
Immediately after graduation from high school, David Danon joined the Irgun (Etzel) and his nom de guerre was "Ehud". He joined the Irgun together with his two classmates and close boyhood friends Amichai Paglin (who was later to become the Chief Operations Officer of the Irgun, Prime Minister Menachem Begin's counter-terrorism advisor, and Prime Minister Begin's Ambassador to the United States) and Eliyahu Bet-Zuri (who later joined the more militant Lehi, and was executed in Egypt for the assassination of Lord Moyne). In 1946, he was arrested by the British. He was released when he was accepted as a medical student at the University of Geneva Medical School, where he was given 24 hours to leave. He evnetually postponed his medical studies and returned to Irgun activity, seeking out and collecting weapons in France to be sent to Irgun fighters in Palestine.

== Medical school ==
David Danon arrived at Medical School of University of Geneva on December 31, 1945 late in the first semester pursuant to the agreement between his father and the British Mandate authorities, essentially exiling him from Palestine for the duration of the British Mandate. He arrived without any knowledge of the French language. Despite his late start in his first year of medical school and his having to learn the French language, he excelled. During his second year in medical school he began to do research. His research was published in the scientific literature between the years 1948 and 1950.

== Research ==
The use of conventional microscopes for study of the nervous system was an obstacle due to the limited resolution capability of the common optical microscope. In order to facilitate the use of the more sophisticated electron microscope it was necessary to cut thinner slices of tissue. Thus, David Danon developed the Microtome (a device for cutting extremely thin slices of tissue) for use on the electron microscope.

== Airborne military evacuation unit ==
Following the 1948 declaration of the State of Israel and following the completion of his medical studies, in 1953 David returned to Israel and began his mandatory military service in the Israeli Air Force. In 1954, Dan Tolkowsky (the commander of the Israeli Air Force at that time) ordered David to establish the airborne medical evacuation unit and appointed him first commander of the unit.

== Scientific activity ==
In 1955, Dannon built the Institute's electron microscope. He began working on the Weizmann Institute of Science while still working as an air force doctor. In 1955, upon his completion of military service, he began working in the Department of Polymers of the Weizmann Institute. In addition to restoring the function of the electron microscope, he developed and prepared the microtome and other devices necessary for the operation of the electron microscope. Later he founded the Electron Microscopy Laboratory at the Weizmann Institute. His pearly research in the Institute's Electron Microscopy Laboratory involved the membrane structure of erythrocytes, their adherence and thrombocytes. In 1957, while working at the Weizmann Institute David Danon founded with Dr. Kalman the Department of Physiology and Anatomy of Animals, at the Faculty of Agriculture in Rehovot where he taught until 1962. His research during this period continued to focus on erythrocytes and thrombocytes, as well as the interaction between these cells and the influenza virus. In 1964 he was appointed head of the Section for Biological Ultrastructure at the Weizmann Institute. In 1967 he was assigned the title of "professor of biology." Prof. Danon was the founder and first President of the Israeli Society for Electron Microscopy and President of the Israeli Society of Hematology and Blood Transfusion. At this time he developed and built Fragiligraph, – a device that enables automatic registration of osmotic fragility curve of erythrocytes, later produced by "Elron".

In later years, Prof. Danon became interested in the process of aging of erythrocytes, and joined the Israeli Association of Gerontology. In 1975 he was elected president of the International Association of Gerontology, and was the first and only Israeli scientist to date to serve in this position (1975-1978). Between the years 1978 to 1987, Prof. Danon served as the Chief Scientist of the Israeli Ministry of Health. In 1979, he was appointed director of the Center for Research on Aging at the Weizmann Institute, a position he held until his retirement from the Institute in 1987. During a Sabbatical in geriatric medicine at Montefiore Hospital in New York in 1984-1985, he devoted major efforts to alleviating the suffering of patients with pressure ulcers. Between the years 1998 to 1991 he served as scientific advisor to the Israeli Ministry of Labor and Social Affairs. Upon his retirement from Weizmann Institute, Prof. Danon was the director of the Waldenberg Gerontology Research Center in New Orleans, Louisiana from 1987 to 1992. At that time while continuing his research on the healing of pressure ulcers, he discovered the critical role of macrophages (a special type of white blood cell) in wound healing. He discovered that the injection of macrophages from young mice, accelerated the healing of wounds in old mice. From 1993 onwards Prof. Danon devoted himself entirely to the development of a unique, remarkably simple, yet new method for the treatment of severe wounds, based on the injection of "activated" macrophages. In this method, Macrophages were prepared from blood units of standard donated blood, using white blood cells that are typically considered undesirable in routine blood transfusions. Macrophages were prepared from a blood unit in a closed sterile system that consisted of a number of interconnected plastic bags. According to the method developed by Prof. Danon, macrophages activation is done by the "hypo-osmotic shock" without any of the toxic materials usually used to activate cells. This work was carried out in the laboratories of Magen David Adom (the Israeli blood bank), and after many years of work the project was crowned with success. As of 1998, the Israeli Ministry of Health has approved the use of activated macrophage injections for the treatment of serious pressure ulcers and other difficult wounds that are not responsive to standard treatments. The method has been so effective, that it is included as covered within Israel's government health coverage plan.

== Awards and acknowledgments ==
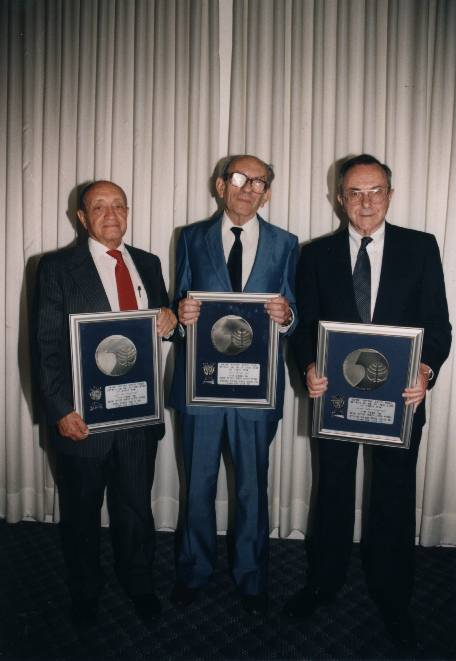
Prof. David Danon (first from left) receives the Jabotinsky Award in 1998.

In 1977, then Israeli Prime Minister Menachem Begin suggested nominating Prof. Danon president of Israel. However, after consultation on this issue with his colleagues at the Weizmann Institute, especially president Ephraim Katzir, Prof Danon came to the conclusion that it was preferable for him to continue to engage in scientific research. In 1989 he was awarded the prize of the International Association of Aging (Sandoz Prize.) In 1998, he was awarded Ze'ev Jabotinsky Award for "lifetime achievement in the service of the national idea and the State of Israel and his contribution to science."

== Painting ==
David Danon studied painting with Aharon Avni, the founder of the Avni Art Institute. Throughout his life, beginning with his teen years, David Danon was painting: when he was imprisoned at Latrun, while attending the University of Geneva Medical School, during the wars in which he served in the airborne medical evacuation unit, while on sabbatical, while traveling, during Army service, and in every place where he worked as a scientist. Some of his paintings were exhibited in research and medical institutions in which he worked. In 2011 David Danon had a solo exhibition at the "Foyer gallery" in Petah Tikva, by the name "Seventy Years of Painting".

== Family ==
David Danon left a wife, three children and seven grandchildren.
