= Nahum Zolotov =

Israeli architect

Nahum Zolotov נחום זולוטוב
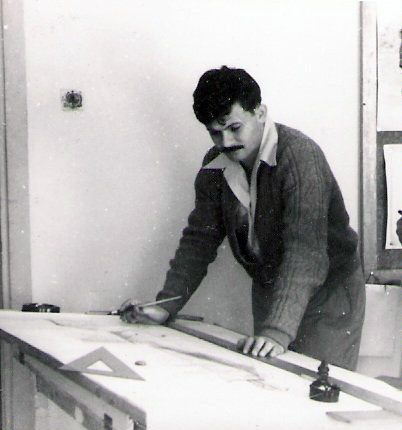
- Nahum Zolotov (1950s)
- Born: 17 November 1926; Warsaw, Poland
- Died: 15 May 2014 (aged 87); Israel
- Education: Technion in Haifa
- Known for: Architect
- Movement: Israeli art

Nahum Zolotov (Hebrew: נחום זולוטוב; November 17, 1926 - May 15, 2014) was an Israeli architect and a recipient of the Rokach Prize in 1961 and in 1973. He was a recipient of the Rechter Prize.

== Biography ==
Zolotov was born in 1926 in the city of Warsaw, Poland and moved with his family to Israel in 1935, where he settled with them in Tel Aviv. In 1939, he began working as a sculptor's apprentice alongside the sculptor Moshe Sternschuss, with whom he stayed in touch and collaborated on many projects, with the most prominent being the Nitzanim Memorial Building dedicated to the fallen of the Battle of Nitzanim.

The Memorial, constructed in 1965, became known as one of the most important buildings in the history of Israeli architecture. The Memorial building also served as a cultural center. The building, built in the brutalist style, is reminiscent of a bunker or military station and overlooks the original site of the Kibbutz. The building, with its different components, tries to evoke in the visitors the feelings of the combat soldier in war over his home, as well as a sense of loss for those who fell. Alongside the building, Zolotov invited the sculptor Moshe Sternschuss to construct a monument for the fallen.

After one year of service in the police force of the Hebrew settlements (during which he did guard duty in the fields of the Kibbutz Ein HaShofet), he began his studies in architecture at the Technion in Haifa. In light of the war, he missed a year and finished his studies in 1950. Since 1955, he has worked independently.

In the 1950s and 1960s, Zolotov became one of the leading and most successful architects of the brutalist style, in Israel, and he was a pioneer of advanced thinking about city planning in Tel Aviv. In 1958, Zolotov planned the first tall building in Tel Aviv. The building, which was built on Ben Yehuda Street 77-79, was eleven stories high (a commercial floor, open floor, eight residential floors, and the top floor, where his office was found). This building represented a turning point in city planning in Israel as it was a pioneer project for the construction of tall buildings. It contained the first supermarket in Israel, which the Supersol company founded. Due to his persistence, the construction was completed and became the tallest in Tel Aviv built in a technologically advanced manner, advancing Zolotov as he became nominated for the Rokach Prize of Architecture in 1961.

Zolotov requested to continue building tall buildings and planned a large neighborhood of towers, tens of floors high, in Givatayim. His theory states that tall buildings should be permanently constructed to allow for large open areas in places like Givatim where the weather permits for large parks. Due to the opposition of the council for city building, and of the contractor company, the project never materialized. Another significant project that he suggested, which was not executed, was his plan for Rothschild Boulevard in which he planned to remove the lines of trees and instead install a circular highway and residential, business and commercial tower. Additionally he suggested a station for public transportation in Tel Aviv (on the site of Beit Hadar and the parking lot connected to it).

In 1963, he won the Rechter Prize for his guest house in Ein Avdat.

In 2011, the book Nahum Zolotov - Architect and City Planner was published by the architect, Tula Amir.

== Selected works ==
- Apartment and Supermarket building, Ben Yehuda Street, Tel Aviv, 1958 (Rokach Prize for Architecture, 1961)
- Housing Projects (Zolotov's Housing Projects), Ashkelon, 1957
- Apartment building, Ashkelon, 1959.
- House project example (with the Architects group) Area 5 in Be'er Sheva, 1959
- The Offices of 'The Mouth of Glilot', Tel Aviv, 1959
- The Ein Gedi school, 1962
- Visiting Center, Ein Avdat, 1962 (Rechter Prize for Architecture)
- Housing projects and Field school, Naot Hakikar, 1963
- Cultural and Memorial Center, Kibutz Nizanim, 1965
- The Recovery House in the Carmel Forests, 1966
- The Main Synagogue, Nazareth Ilit, 1967
- Shabak Headquarters, Tel Aviv, 1967 (Rokach Architecture Prize 1973)
- Private Hospital, 1967, Ramat Aviv, (The building wasn't finished and the foundation was destroyed)
- Student Cafeteria and Club (Today the Architecture Department), late 1960s, Tel Aviv University, Tel Aviv
- South Tel Aviv Train Station, 1970 (Not in use today)
- The Synagogue of the Unification of Immigrants from Babylon/ Iraq, Be'er Sheva, 1971
- The Dolphinarium in Tel Aviv, 1978 (Not in use today)
- The Synagogue of the Iraqi Ethnic Group, Be'er Sheva, 1973-1981
- The House of the 'Israeli Experience', Old Jaffa (Today the building has been converted to a commercial and residential one and is entirely changed)
