= Joseph Kossonogi =

Hungarian and Israeli artist

Joseph Kossonogi יוסף קוסונוגי
- Born: 2 April 1908; Budapest, Austro-Hungarian Empire
- Died: 10 March 1981 (aged 72)
- Education: Histadrut Art Studio under Isaac Frenkel; Berlin Academy of Art
- Known for: Painting
- Style: Figurative Expressionism

Joseph Kossonogi (Hebrew: יוסף קוסונוגי; 2 April 1908 – 10 March 1981) (also Yosef Kossonogy) was an Israeli painter.

== Biography ==
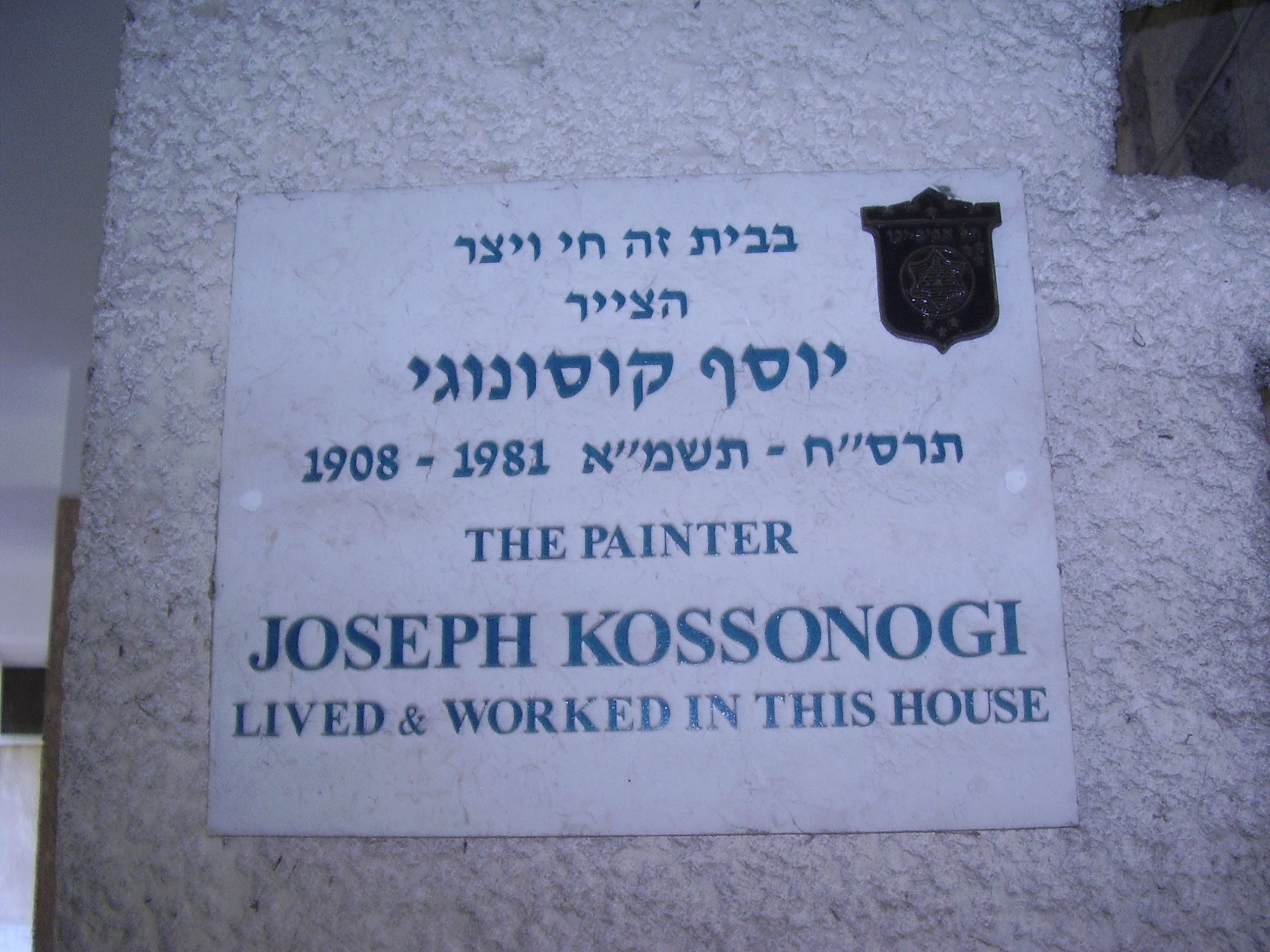
Memorial plaque, Tel Aviv

Joseph Kossonogi was born in Budapest, Hungary in 1908. After studies at the Berlin Academy of Art and advanced studies in France, the Netherlands, Italy and Spain, he immigrated to Mandate Palestine and settled in Tel Aviv in 1926. Kossonogi studied under Isaac Frenkel in the Histadrut art studio during 1926–29. There he formed along with Frenkel and the rest of his students the collective of young painters known as Massad.

In 1929, the Massad group had its first exhibition, and, in 1935, the group's members joined the Israel Association of Painters and Sculptors. Kossonogi had one-man shows at the Tel Aviv Museum of Art in 1944 and 1954, in which years he was a co-recipient of the Dizengoff Prize in painting. In 1956, Kossonogi joined the Artists' Colony in Safed. In 1958, the former president of France Vincent Auriol began collecting his work. Kossonogi won the Histadrut Prize in 1966 and the Nordau Prize in 1976. He settled in Safed in 1956 and died in 1981.

Colour figures strongly in Kossonogi's oeuvre. He was preoccupied with the bright sun of Eretz Israel and its effect on the lands, crops, and lives of Jewish settlers and native Arabs. Israeli art critic Gideon Ofrat writes of the artist's oeuvre: "Kossonogi launched his career with romantic watercolours rich in brown and green staining; subsequently, under the influence of Raoul Dufy, they grew lighter and focused on the poetical effects of transparency and fluidity." Kossonogi's focus on light and colour was likely inherited from the European influences that marked his formative period, notably Henri Matisse and André Derain. Along with important Israeli watercolourists Mordechai Avniel and Shimshon Holzman, Kossonogi was considered a master of the aquarelle medium.

== Selected exhibitions ==
- 2004: University of Haifa Art Gallery, Haifa: Our Landscape: Notes on Landscape Painting in Israel (online catalogue)
- 1944: Tel-Aviv Museum of Art

== Selected collections ==
- Israel Museum, Jerusalem

== See also ==
- Visual arts in Israel
