= Buky Schwartz =

Israeli sculptor

Buky Schwartz בוקי שוורץ
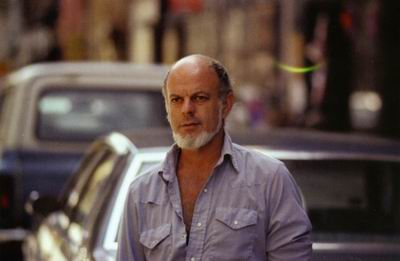
- Buky Schwartz, 1980
- Born: June 16, 1932; Jerusalem
- Died: September 1, 2009 (aged 77)
- Education: Avni Institute of Art and Design, Tel Aviv; Saint Martin's School of Art, London
- Known for: Sculpture
- Movement: Israeli art

Buky Schwartz (/ˈbuːki/ BOO-kee; Hebrew: בוקי שוורץ, [ˈbuki ˈʃvaʁts]; June 16, 1932 – September 1, 2009, Tel Aviv) was an Israeli sculptor and video artist.

== Biography ==
Moshe (Buky) Schwartz was born in Jerusalem. From 1956 to 1958, he studied sculpture with Yitzhak Danziger (1916–1977) at the Avni Institute of Art and Design, under Aharon Avni in Tel Aviv. In 1959, he moved to London to study at Saint Martin's School of Art. In 1966–1967, he taught at Saint Martin's.

== Art career ==
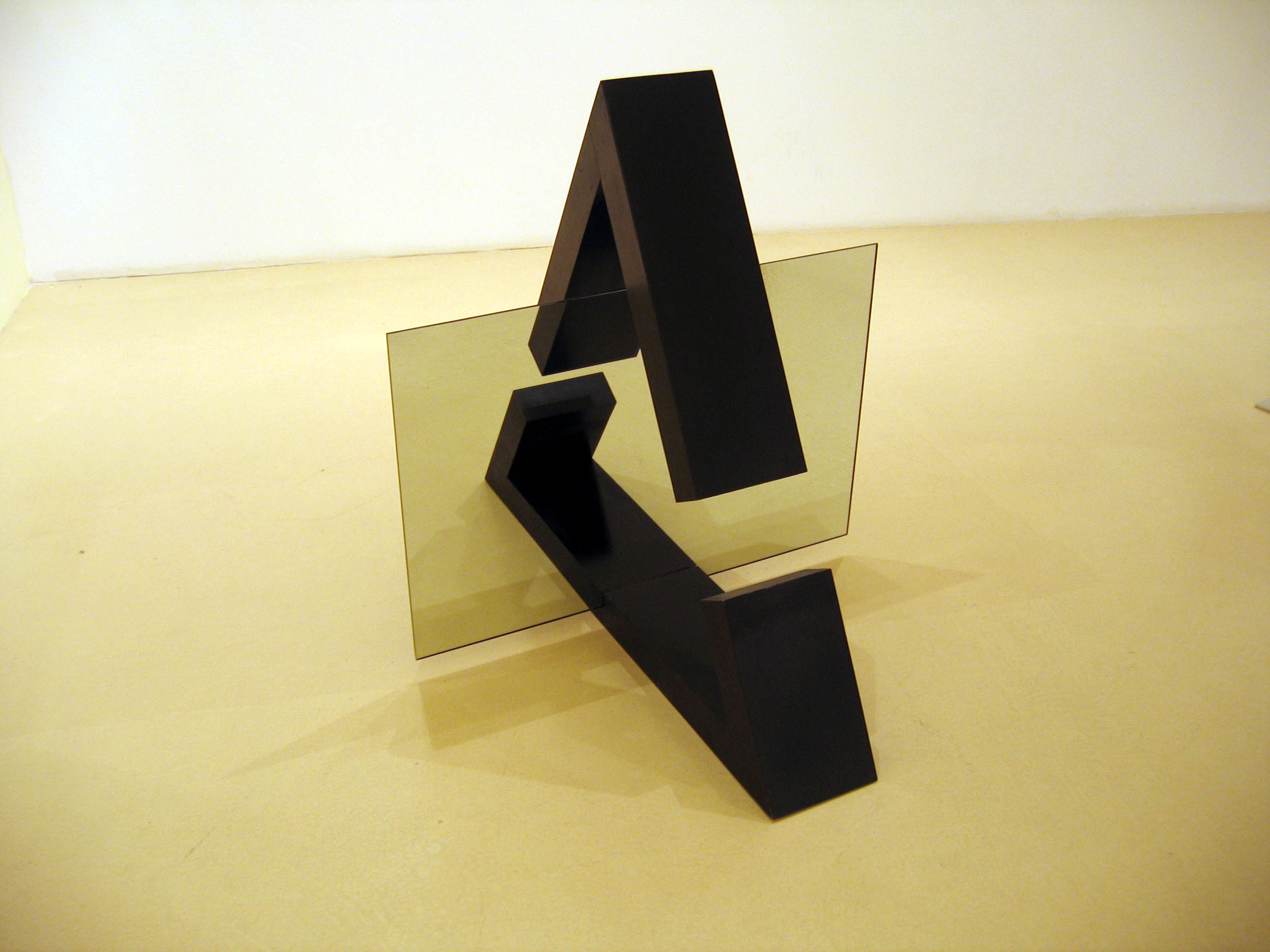
"Reflection Triangle," 1980

After returning to Israel in 1963, he became known for his painted steel sculptures that were predominantly geometric in form. In 1971, he moved to New York City and began making "video structures" in which he filled a room with shapes that came together as a unified whole when projected on a video screen. He also placed mirrors inside sculptures that reflected the sculpture as a whole or certain parts of it. Schwartz also created conceptual art based on an exploration of his own body. He showed his video installations at The Cultural Space on Canal Street in Manhattan.

Schwartz lived and worked in Tel Aviv and New York City until he died in 2009.

== Awards and recognition ==
- 1961 Sainsbury Awards, Sainsbury's, United Kingdom
- 1962 German Critics' Prize, Association of German Critics, Berlin, Germany
- 1965 Dizengoff Prize for Sculpture
- 1971 Nuremberg Urban Symposium Purchase Award, Nuremberg Urban Symposium, Nuremberg, Germany
- 1980 Fellowship, Community Arts Partnership, New York, USA
- 1983 Video Art Award, New York State Council on the Arts, New York, USA
- 1983 Residency Program, Mid Atlantic Arts Foundation, USA
- 1987 Guggenheim Award, Guggenheim, New York, USA
- 1988 Sculpture Grant, National Endowment for the Arts, USA
- 1989 Annual International Prize for Video Sculpture, L'immagine Elettronica, Italy
- 1990 Grant for Publication, Guggenheim, New York, USA
- 1991 Painting and sculpture prize, Ministry of Culture and Education
- 1992 Video Sculpture Prize, Pollok Prize
- 1995 Elhanani Prize, Tel Aviv, for Integration of Art and Architecture
- Yehoshua Rabinowitz Fund for Arts, for his painted steel sculpture at Rothschild Blvd, Tel Aviv

== Outdoor sculptures ==
- 1963–64 Altars and Water Channels, Weizmann Institute of Science, Rehovot, Israel
- 1967 Pillar of heroism, Yad Vashem, Jerusalem
- 1969 Gates, Yad Vashem, Jerusalem
- 1969 White from 0 Degrees to 180 Degrees, Israel Museum, Jerusalem
- 1986 Memorial to Jonathan Netanyahu, Philadelphia, Pennsylvania
- 1986 Dead Sea Sculpture, Ein Bokek, Dead Sea ()
- 1988–92 Painted steel sculpture, Rothschild Blvd, Tel Aviv
- 1990 Metropolis, 1990, Tel Aviv University ()
- 1996 Obelisk, Kibutz Galuiot St., Tel Aviv
- 1997–98 Capital, outdoor sculpture, Isracard Building, Tel Aviv
- 1997–98 Pinball machine, Isracard Building, Tel Aviv
- 1998 Zig-Zag, landscape sculpture, steel, Park West, Ra'anana
- 2001 "Leonardo" Ramat Poleg, Netanya, Israel
- 2002 Between earth and sky, Kiriat Uno, Israel
- 2002 The Giving Tree, Lavon Park, Holon, Israel
- 2007 Mosquito, Tel Aviv Museum of Art ()
- 2011 Aviron, Giv'atayim Theatre Sculpture Garden, Givatayim, Israel ()

== Archive ==
Buky Schwartz's family donated his archival collection to the Israel Museum, Jerusalem in 2019. The Buky Schwartz Archive is housed at the museum's Information Center for Israeli Art. It contains some 2,000 archival items documenting the work process of the artist. Throughout his career Schwartz collected materials pertaining to his works including: handwritten installation manuals, correspondence, photographs, sketches, prints, negatives, invitations to exhibitions and other documentation. The content of the artist's analog video collection, approximately 50 tapes, consists of documentation of video installations, works in progress, and press releases including interviews with the artist. The video documentation of Schwartz’s installations illustrates the mechanics of the work, and the impact the work had on viewers.

The Information Center is in the process of digitizing and cataloging the collection to make the images more accessible.

== Gallery ==
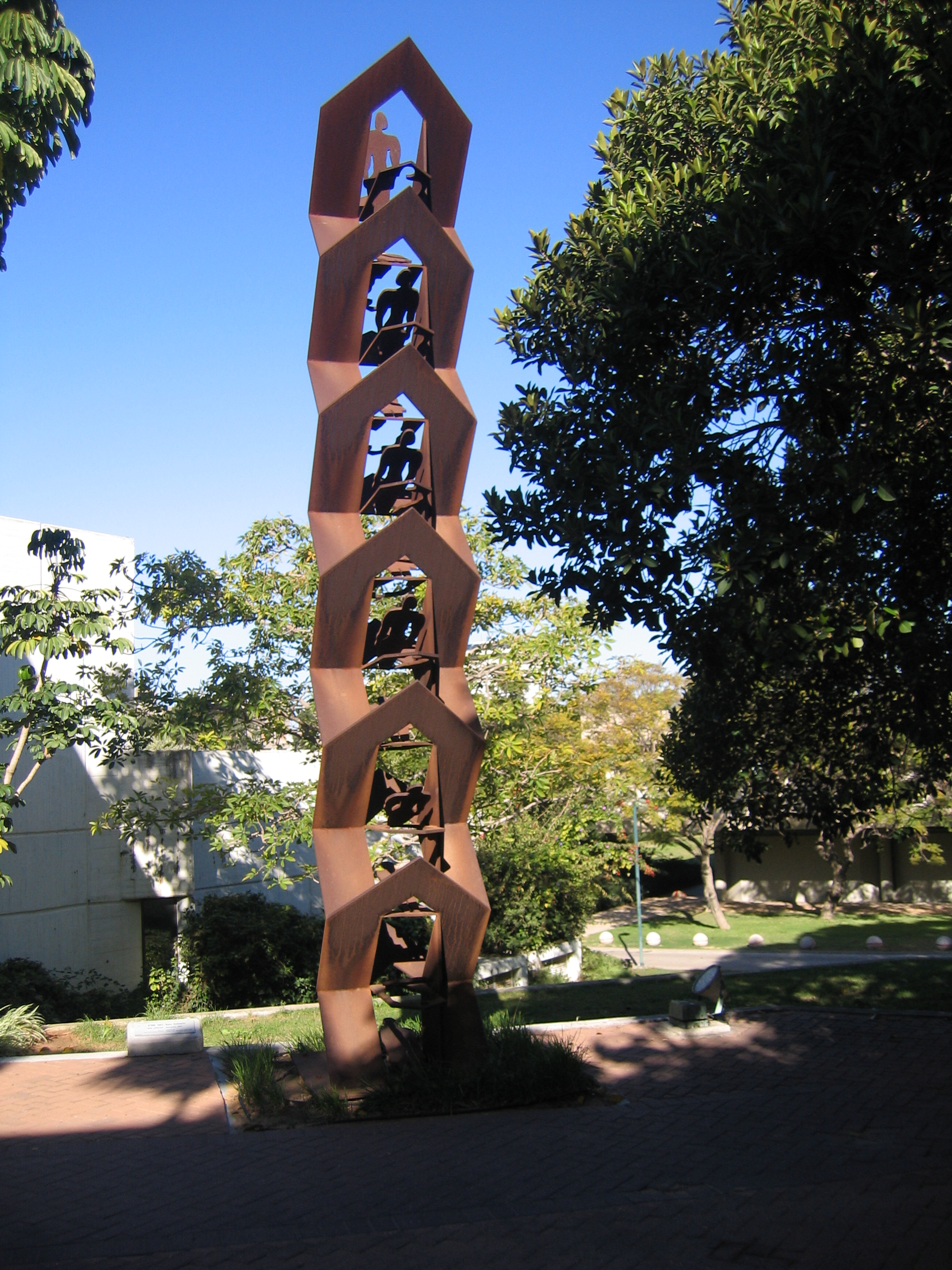
’Metropolis’, 1990 sculpture by Buky Schwartz, Tel Aviv University

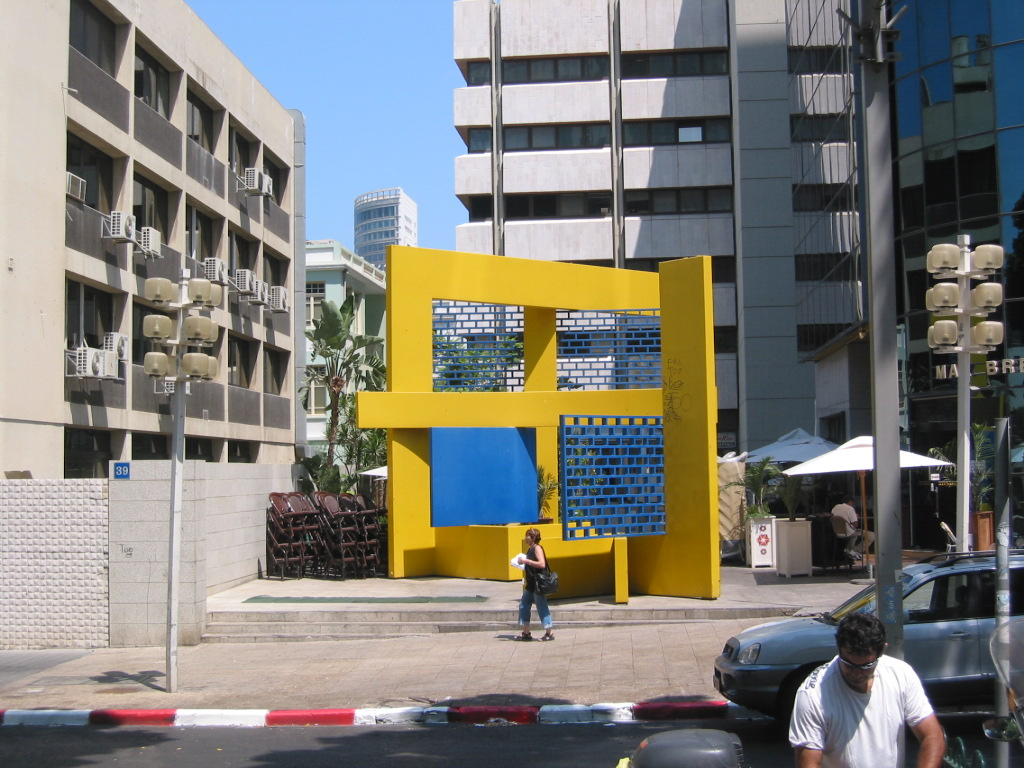
Sculpture by Buky Schwartz in Rothschild Boulevard, Tel Aviv

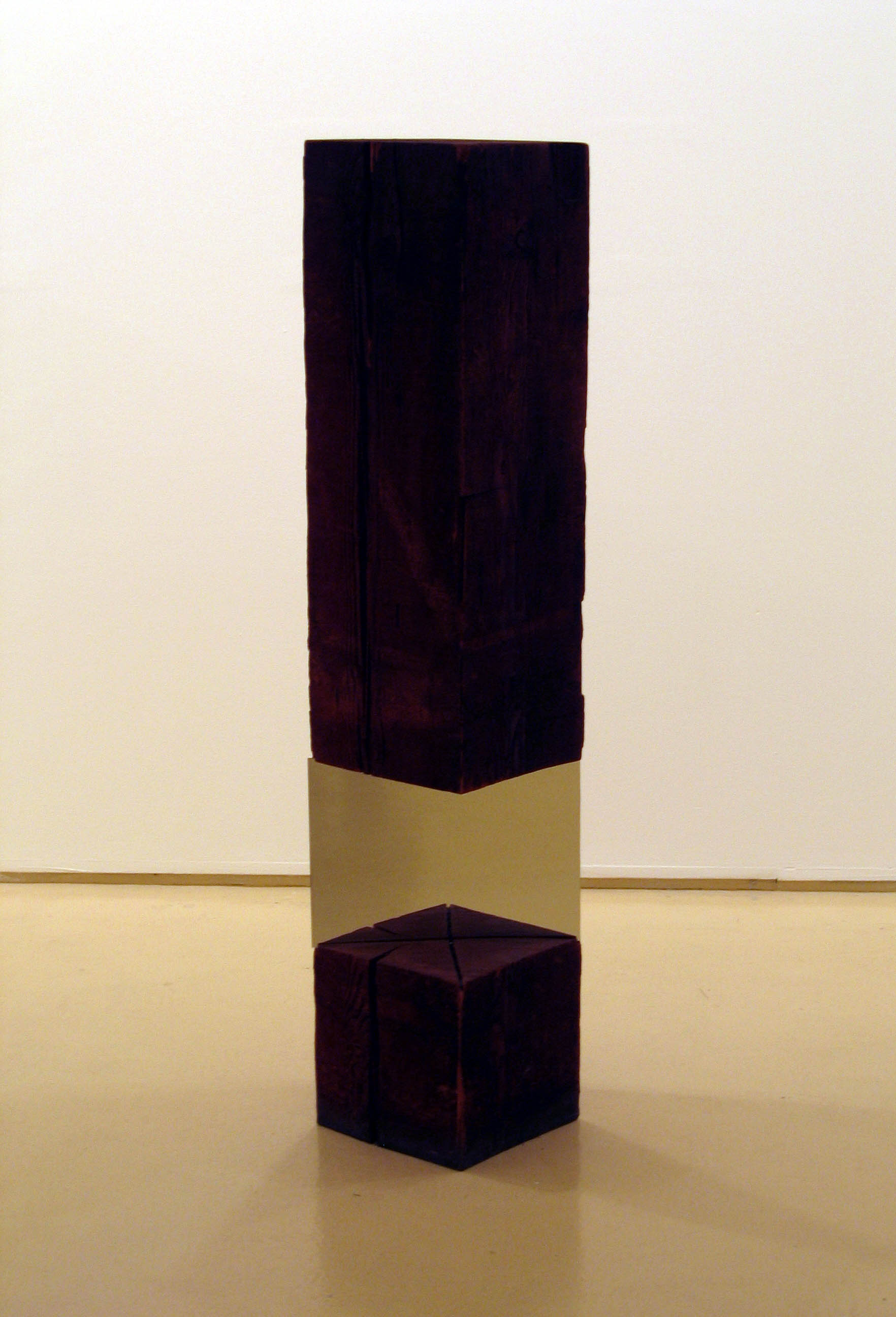
’Levitation’, 1976 sculpture by Buky Schwartz

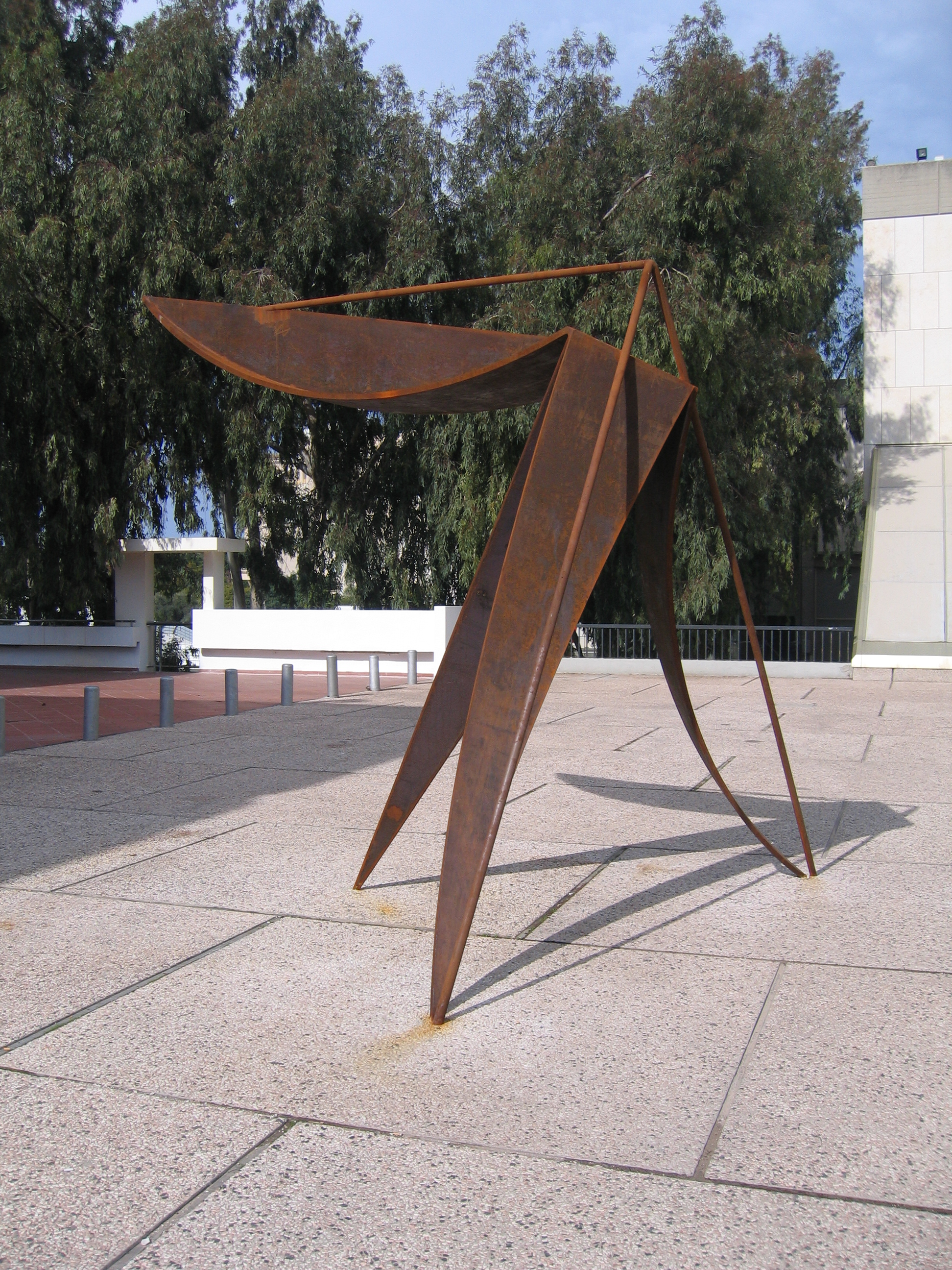
'Mosquito', 2007 sculpture by Buky Schwartz, Tel Aviv Museum of Art

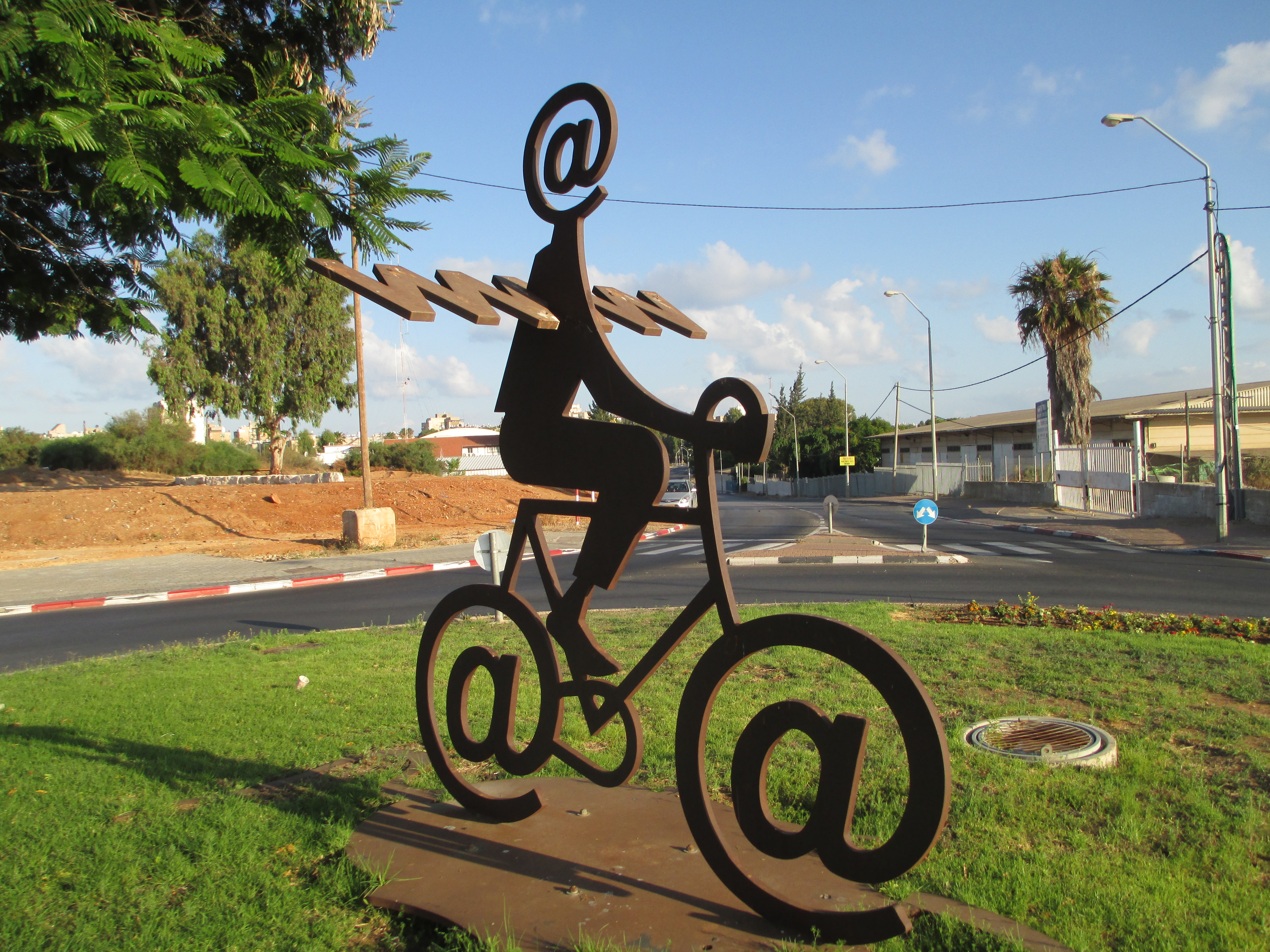
'The Internet Messenger' by Buky Schwartz, Holon, Israel

== See also ==
- Visual arts in Israel
