= Technion Faculty of Architecture =

Research Faculty in Haifa, Israel

Coordinates: 32°46′41″N 35°01′23″E

The Faculty of Architecture and Town Planning (The Technion)
- הפקולטה לארכיטקטורה ובינוי ערים (הטכניון) (Hebrew)
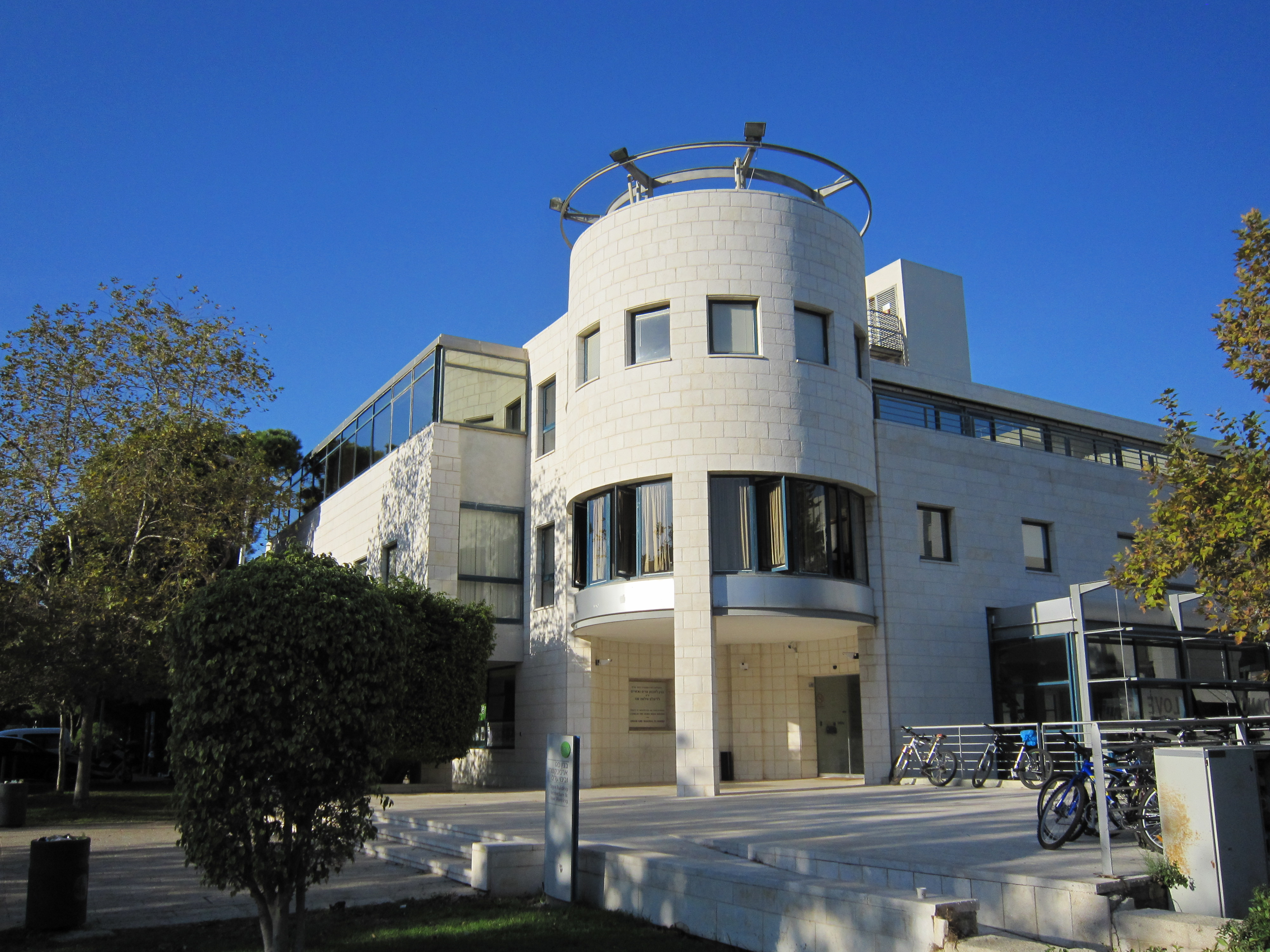
- Type: Public; Technical; Research
- Established: 1925
- Dean: Karel Martens
- Location: Haifa, Israel
- Website: architecture.technion.ac.il

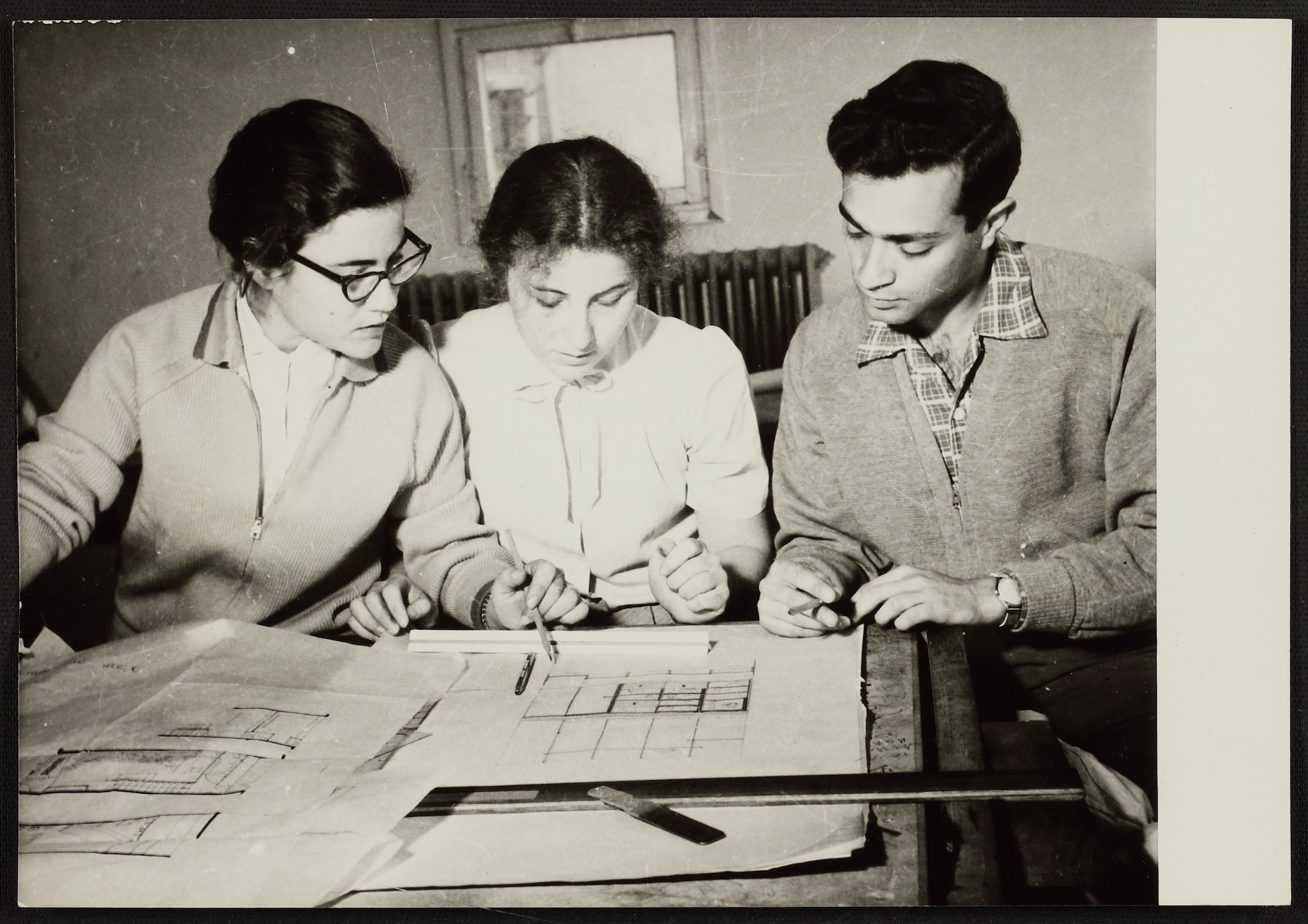
Students at The Technion Faculty of Architecture

The Technion's Faculty of Architecture and Town Planning (Hebrew: הפקולטה לארכיטקטורה ובינוי ערים) was established in Haifa in December 1924, as one of the Technion’s first two departments. The program trains architects, landscape architects, urban planners, and industrial designers. Urban planning and industrial design are offered as advanced degrees.

The Faculty is housed in the Segoe and Amado buildings on the Technion Campus. It was the last department to relocate from the Technion's historic site in the Hadar HaCarmel neighborhood in 1985.

== Faculty building at the Hadar campus ==
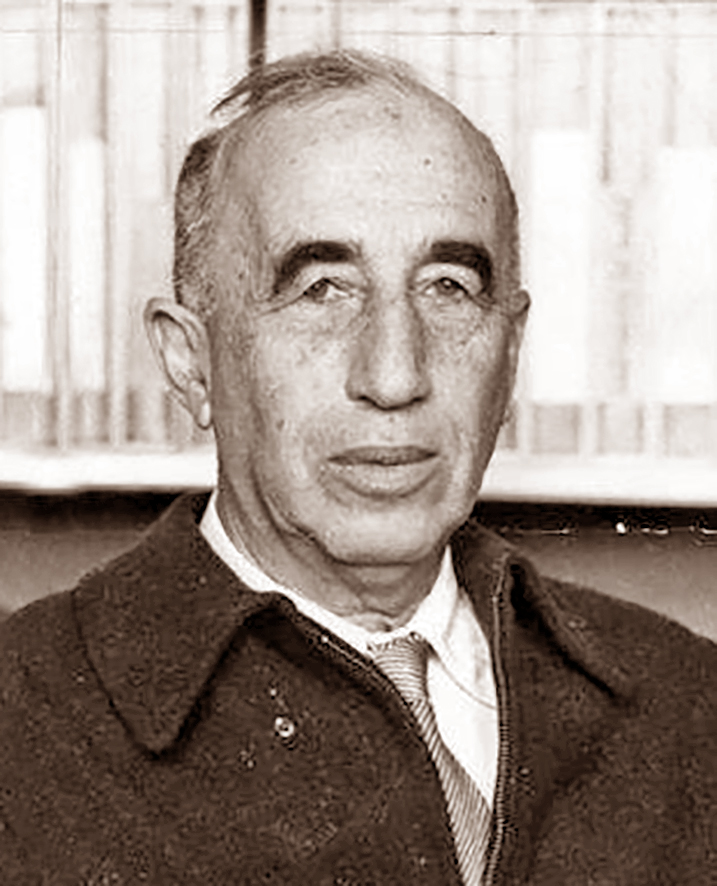
Yohanan Ratner, the first Dean of the Faculty of Architecture

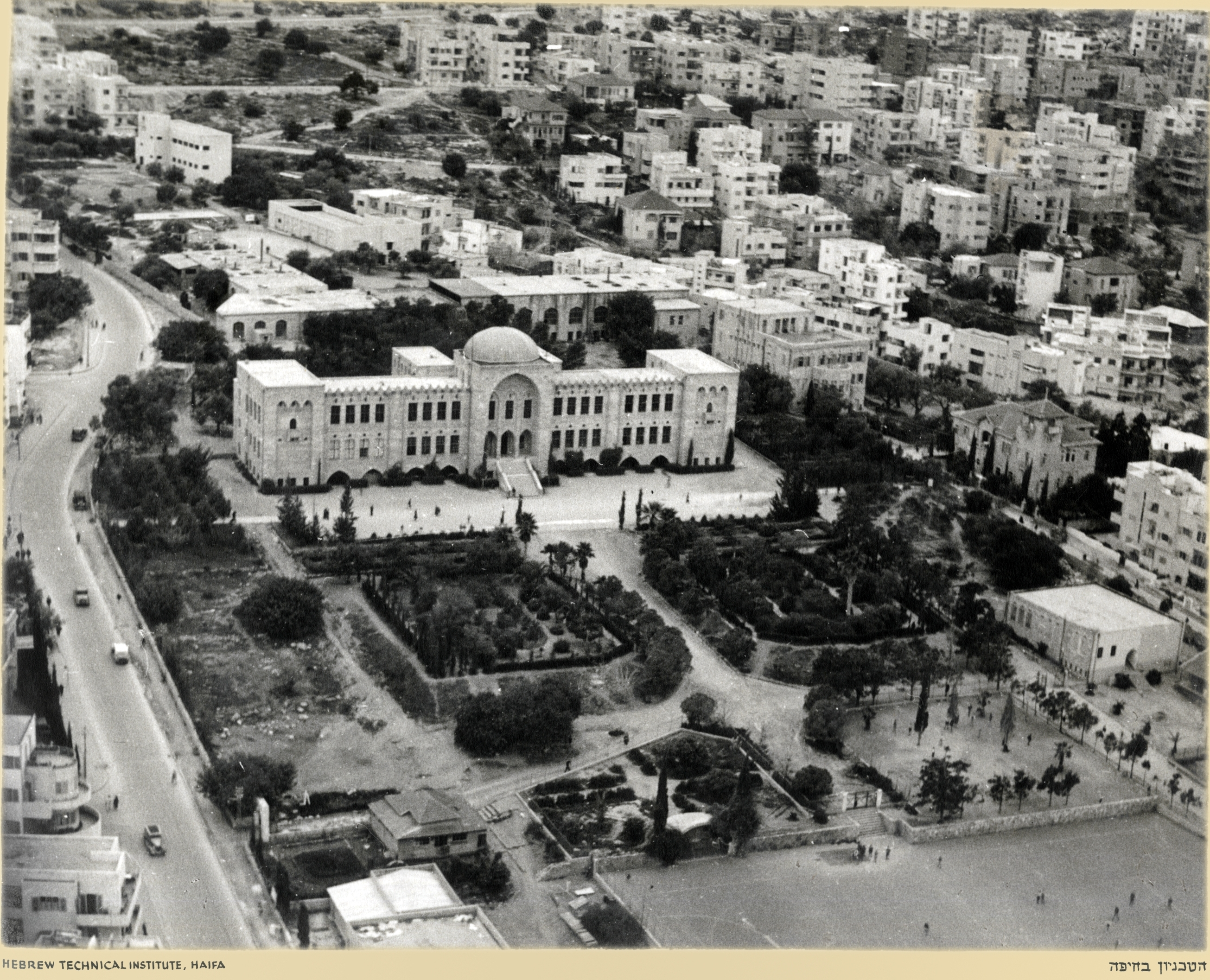
The Technion building, garden and surrounding buildings; aerial photograph by Zoltan Kluger 1937–1938

In its early years, the Technion was housed in a building planned by the first head of the Architecture department, Professor Alexander Baerwald (1877–1930) in the Hadar neighborhood in the heart of Haifa. In designing the Technikum building, Baerwald combined principles of Western architecture with Orientalist architectural approaches, such as pointed arches and the use of stone as a primary construction material. The monumental building relies on distinct symmetry and is entered via a three-story atrium, which includes the building's central corridor.

The building's cornerstone was laid in 1912 in the Hadar neighborhood, and construction was completed in 1914, although the Technion was not inaugurated for academic use until 1924. During the interim years, it served as a temporary hospital for the Turkish military, a German army slaughterhouse, and a British army base. On 14 December 1924, night classes began being offered for laborers, and on 7 January 1925, the first daytime class was held for the first cohort of the Department of Construction and Paving.

== Faculty development ==
Soon after the Technikum began to operate as an academic institution, the Architecture department was opened, offering a single training program. Baerwald formulated the program's foundational curriculum, and following his death in 1930, questions arose regarding the future of the program. Yohanan Ratner, who had joined the Faculty in 1925 and had served as Baerwald's assistant, was tasked with the mission of carving out a new path for the Architecture department. Ratner had earned professional acclaim following his victory in a 1928 design competition for Israel's National Institutions House in Jerusalem, in which many of Israel's leading architects participated.

Many of the Faculty's lecturers during its early days were educated at higher learning institutions in Germany and immigrated to Israel with the rise of the Nazi party in 1933. Among them was the world-renowned planner Alexander Klein, who joined the Faculty in 1935 after serving as an urban planning consultant for the Jewish National Fund. He was well known in the field prior to his arrival in Israel for his development of new graphic analysis methods for architectural plans. Klein headed the Construction and Housing Research institution, which the Technion launched in 1943. The unique institution grappled with issues of city planning and housing which addressed Israel's local climate and topography, as well as the contemporaneous economic, health and social circumstances. In 1945, Klein was appointed research professor in Urbanism and Agricultural Planning, the Technion's first research professorship.

In the years preceding Israel's establishment, few students were enrolled at the Faculty, and a graduating class of 12 students was considered a large cohort. During these years, the educational emphasis was on technical aspects of architecture, similar to the central European approach. Most of the study hours were devoted to theoretical courses, and little time was allotted for practical applications and exposure to planning problems. In 1952, it was decided that in their third year of studies, student would choose between two majors: Building Design or Urban Planning. In the early 1960s, two Faculty professors (Alfred Neumann and Daniel Havkin) united with Alfred Mansfeld, who urged a new model of learning in which two and a half days a week would be reserved for practical applications, and the rest of the time would be devoted to theoretical study. Mansfeld and his peers sought to implement these changes immediately in their own courses, to which Faculty Dean Avia Hashimshoni objected. Hashimshoni asserted that the Faculty was responsible for establishing the curriculum, and lecturers should not determine their course curricula independently. When their request was denied, the Mansfeld group of professors announced their resignation from the Faculty of Architecture and Town Planning. This led to the involvement of the Technion's Senate, and the establishment of two separate majors at the Faculty: one according to the traditional approach, and the second according to the Mansfeld group's proposed method7. This decision was met with resistance from both students and faculty and was retracted a few months later, in May 1966.

The dispute between the lecturers led the students to organize an Architecture Faculty Student Council, which continued to exist after the issue was resolved, and was later the model for the Technion's Student Union and was replicated in all the other Faculties at the university.

In 1970, students refused to participate in courses run by Mansfeld and his peers, and preferred Hashimshoni, Abraham Wachman, and David Yanai. The boycott led Mansfeld to resign as course coordinator. Some claimed that the boycott was the continuation of the original dispute between Hashimshoni and Mansfeld, while others insisted it was unrelated.

== From the Hadar campus to the Neve Sha’anan campus ==
By 1950, a growing student population and space limitations on the Hadar campus inspired a plan to relocate the university to a new site. The Tirat HaCarmel area was chosen, and Klein was recruited to plan the campus. However, in late 1952, the university officially declared that the campus would instead relocate to Haifa's Neve Sha’anan neighborhood. Klein's plans for the Tirat HaCarmel campus were adjusted to suit the layout at the Neve Sha’anan location. The university gradually relocated to the new site, which offered the flexibility to permit future expansion and the addition of new faculties. The Faculty of Architecture and Town Planning moved to the Neve Sha’anan campus in 1953, where it was run from the Aeronautics building, planned by Ratner, who at the time served as dean of the Faculty. In 1965, following Ratner's death, the Faculty's funding declined as did its standing, from the perspective of the Technion management. As such, it was relocated to its original building in Hadar. The students rejoiced over the return to Hadar, and that same year launched the "ArchiParchiTura," an annual Purim parade during the 1970s and 80s on Haifa's Herzl Street, which had been studied as a special project at the Faculty. The festive parade stemmed from a broader mission for the Faculty to find ways to contribute to its home neighborhood. In the 1980s, due to the old building's dilapidated condition, the Technion decided to evacuate it. At the time, it housed the Faculty of Architecture along with the Nuclear Engineering Department. Students and lecturers alike petitioned to remain in the building, claiming it offered inspiration and that architectural studies necessitate a connection to the urban fabric, and should not be held in a detached academic environment. They also argued that the historic building had unique value and it would be difficult to adapt it to other uses. The issue was even discussed in the Knesset.

In 2016, part of the architecture school returned to Hadar, as the "Hadarion", which hosts studio courses and classes related to the place and community, as well as other unique projects, such as designing homes from shipping containers. In 2021, the second year studies in architecture and landscape architecture were transferred to the Hadarion building.

== Academic tracks ==
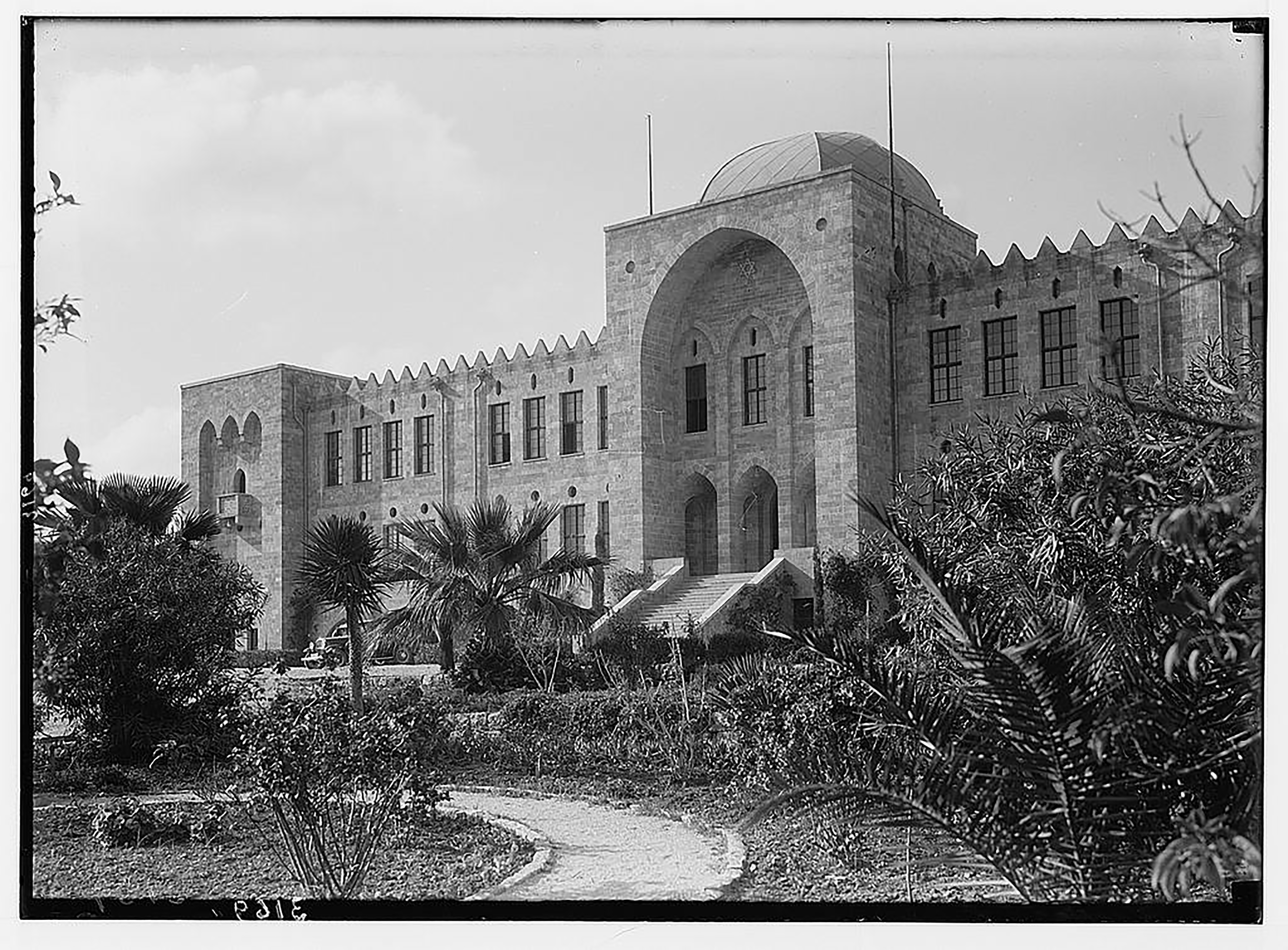
haifa – technion building

=== Architecture ===
The Faculty includes an architectural studies track, whose graduates are automatically registered in the Register of Engineers and Architects. Although the Faculty was the only institute in Israel that offered a recognized academic degree in architecture until the early 1990s, the curriculum was continuously updated. In several instances, clashes between faculty members, backed by students, were perceived as part of the process of updating and adapting the teaching methods to the changing times.

=== Advanced degrees ===
Architects Aharon Kashtan and Daniel Havkin were the first graduates to complete research projects in the Faculty, but did not receive advanced degrees because the Technion's Graduate School had not yet been established. The first two master's research projects submitted to the Faculty were written by women, one of whom was Ruth Enis, who later cofounded the Landscape Architecture track. She was awarded a master's degree for her research thesis which was written under the supervision of Prof. Yochanan Alon in 1956.

== See also ==
- Technion – Israel Institute of Technology
