= Ofakim Hadashim =

Art movement started in Tel Aviv in 1942

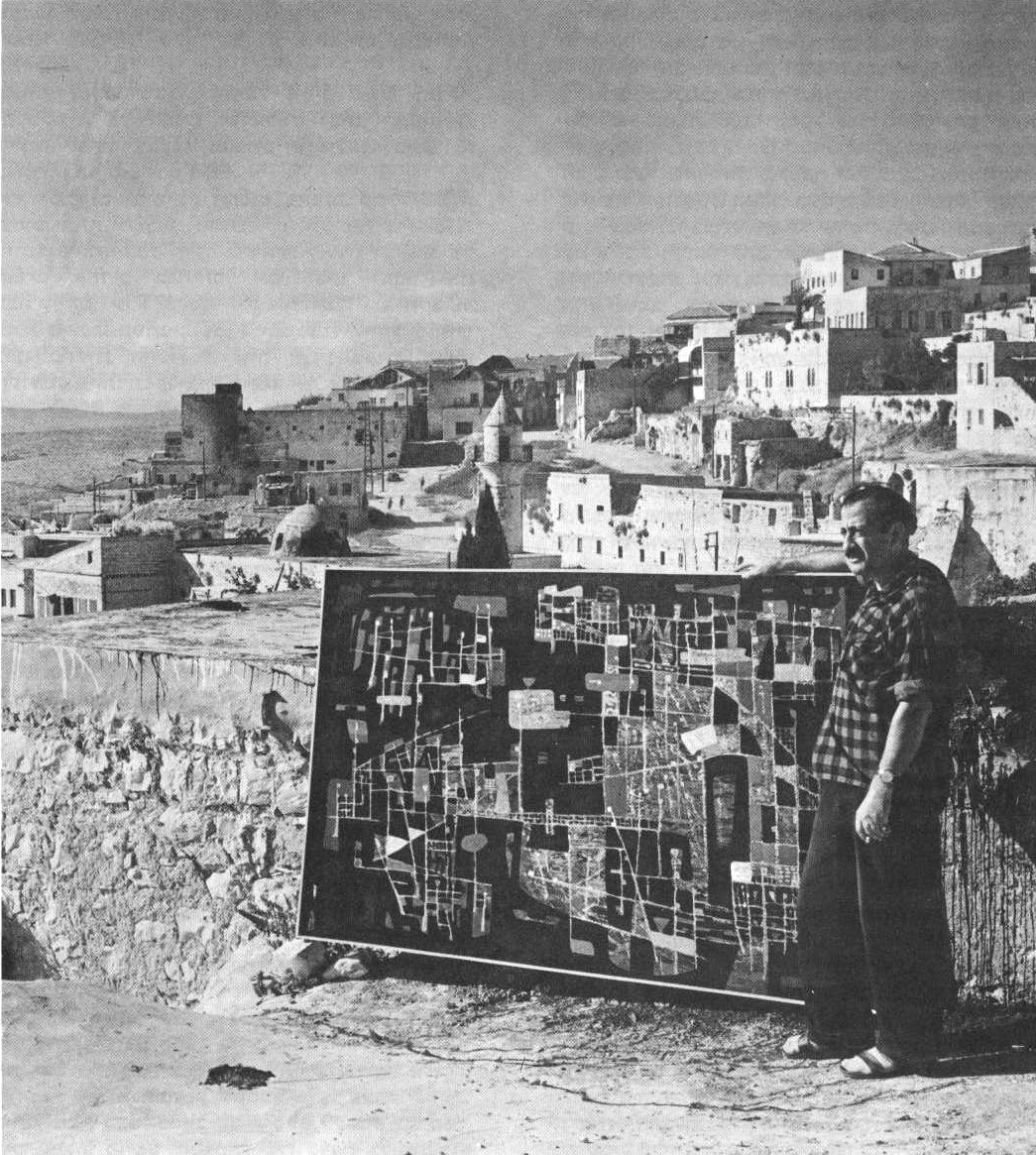
Moshe Castel with his painting "Zohar", in the artists quarter of Safed, 1956

Ofakim Hadashim (Hebrew: [(ʔ)ofaˈkim χadaˈʃim], lit. "New Horizons") is an art movement started in Tel Aviv in 1942.

== New Horizons ==
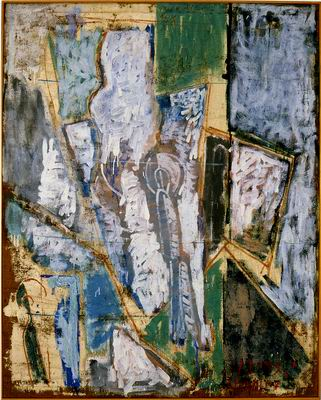
Joseph Zaritsky Naan, The Painter and the Model, 1949 Israel Museum, Jerusalem

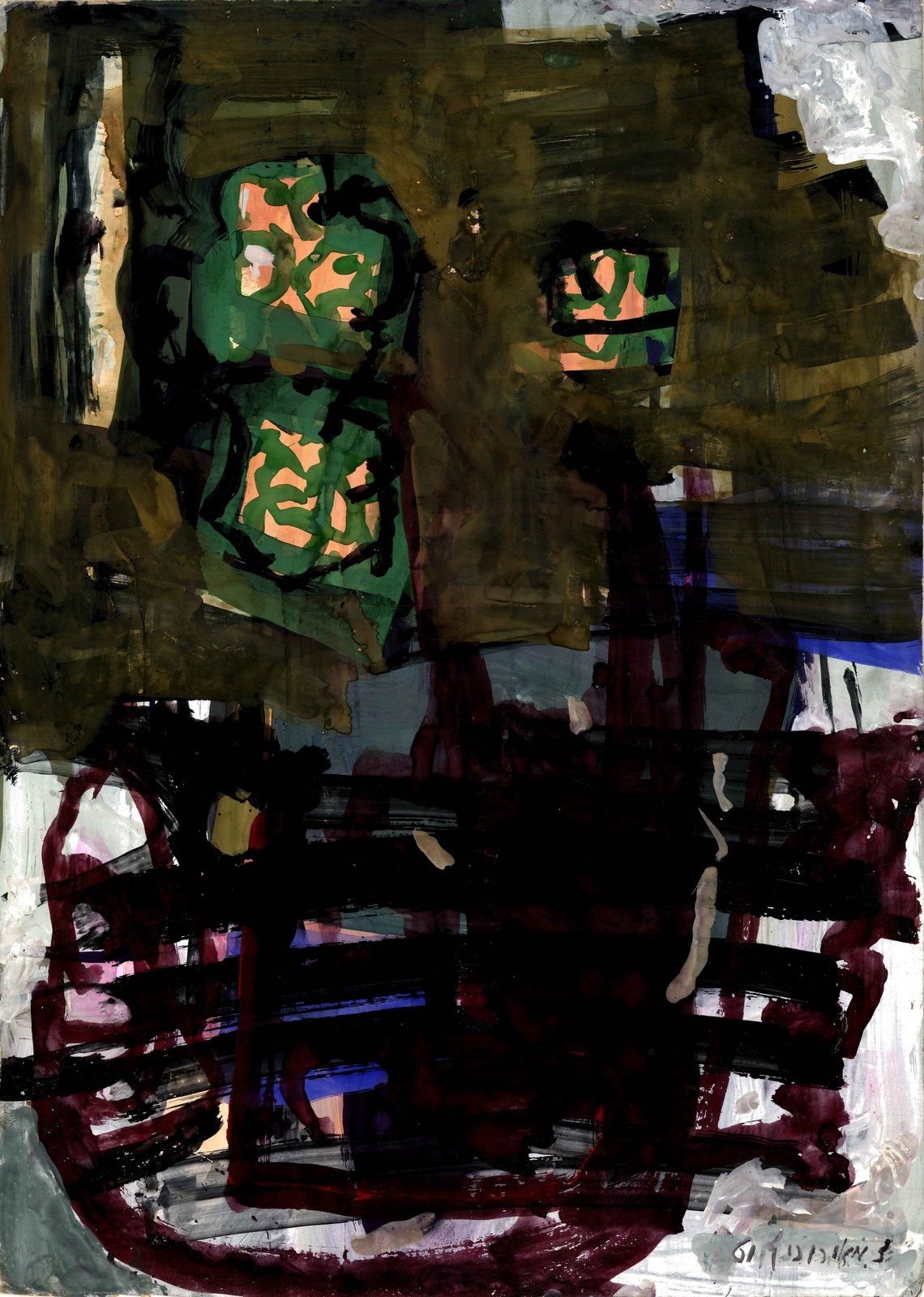
Zvi Meirovich gouache 1961 70x50 cm

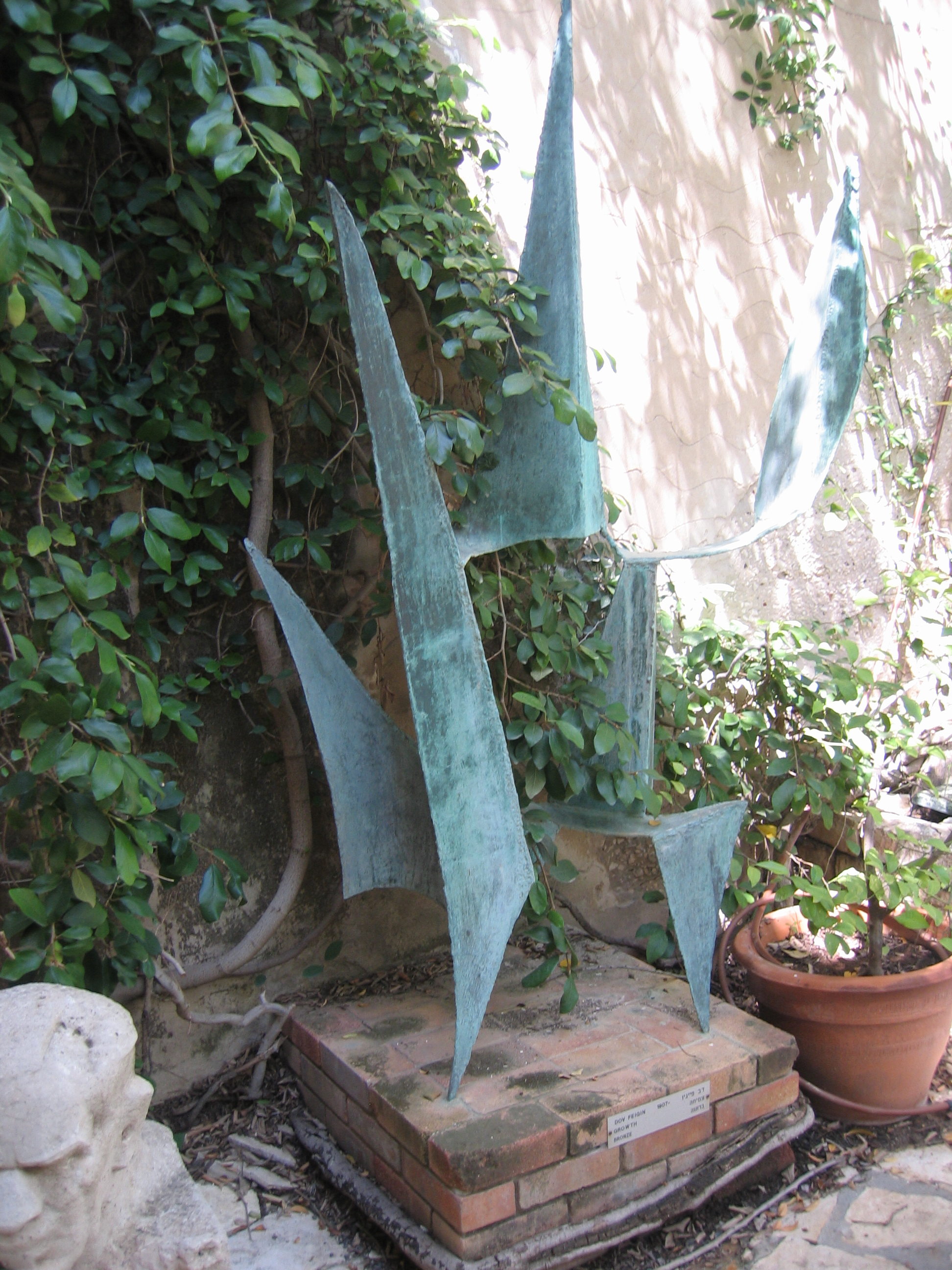
Dov Feigin Growth, 1959 Ein Harod Mueeum of Art

The Ofakim Hadashim art movement began with a group of artists who mounted an exhibition in Tel Aviv's Habima national theater in December 1942, under the name "The Group of Eight". The group evolved into a coherent artistic movement only after the founding of the state of Israel in 1948. Members of the school included Arie Aroch, Zvi Meirowitch, Avraham Naton (Natanson), Avigdor Stematsky, Moshe Castel and Yehezkel Streichman. Several of these artists were the students of École de Paris artist, Isaac Frenkel Frenel.

The work of sculptor Dov Feigin also appeared in the catalog of the 1942 exhibition, though it was not displayed. In February 1947 five of the original members of the group joined Joseph Zaritsky for an exhibit called "The Group of Seven" at the Tel Aviv Museum of Art. Members of the group stated that "The group is based in modernism, especially French, yet seeks a unique style that expresses our own reality".

For these artists, this was not only a statement of philosophy, but a practical work plan. Zaritsky, who served as chairman of the League of Painters and Sculptors in the Land of Israel, opposed the league's philosophy of equality among artists. In 1948, at the time of the opening of the artists' house that was to become the League's permanent home, he was delegated to select works for the Bienniale in Venice. His selections caused such an outrage among the members that he was ousted from his position. He walked out with a group of artists, and founded an alternative movement, the "New Horizons". On 9 November 1948, the Tel Aviv Museum of Art opened the first exhibit bearing the movement's name. Among the artists showing were Pinchas Abramovich, Marcel Janco, Aharon Kahana, Yohanan Simon, Avshalom Okashi and Moshe Castel, as well as movement founders Zaritsky, Streichman and Feigin.

The group sought a style that reflected the striving for Zionism and Modernism. This style was largely dictated by the leading artists of the group - Zaritsky, Stematsky, Mairovich and Streichman. In practice, this style was a variant of European modernism. The style has been called "lyrical abstract", but in fact, there was little purely abstract art, but rather works rooted in the local visual landscape. This essentially figurative style was pushed toward the abstract by bold brush strokes, and a strong use of bright colors typical of the "Land of Israel" style, reflecting the strong Mediterranean light. Formats were generally rather small, and the style was similar to European abstract art before the second World War, akin to the art of Wassily Kandinsky, and unlike the abstract art prevalent in the United States at the time.

For example, in his series "Yehiam" (1949–1952), Zaritsky depicts scenes from the establishment of Kibbutz Yehiam in northern Israel. The early paintings in this series (mostly watercolors) depict the natural landscapes of the region, while the later paintings are (mostly oil) abstractions of these earlier scenes. This progression, contends art critic and curator Mordecai Omer, reflects Zaritsky's belief that external visual reality is the basis of artistic originality.

Zvi Meirovich, a prominent members of Okakim Hadashim, painted in the abstract lyric style but unlike his colleagues he was more inclined to a German rather than a French pallette. As seen in his bold use of black and reds particularly in the gouaches. The big breakthrough was in oil pastels, that only he made in large format. Using a deep space photo surface rather than a flat paper was a pioneering moment.

Others in the group, however, deviated from this style. Marcel Janco, of international fame for his involvement in the Dada movement in Europe in the 1930s, did not adopt this approach to abstraction; rather his art uses European Cubist and Expressionist styles to create a Jewish-Zionist narrative. Moshe Castel, also, went through a transformation during the 1950s from abstraction to expressionism characteristic of the Canaanist movement.

In the field of sculpture, the group introduced new media. Yechiel Shemi, Dov Feigin, and, after a sojourn in Britain, Itzhak Danziger, introduced welded steel as a new medium. This new form freed these artists from the figurative character of stone and wood carving, for a more purely abstract oeuvre. Here, too, however, there is frequent reference to the Canaanite figurativeness and symbolism.

Indeed, during the 1950s, the "New Horizons" group tended more and more toward the abstract, and away from reliance on the figurative. Zaritsky led this shift, which was rooted in what he saw as a guiding ideology. Some members of the group, however, rejected this ideology, and eventually quit the movement. These included Janco, Aharon Kahana and Yehiel Simon.

== Realism and Social art ==
While the abstract and secular works of the New Horizons group had profound influence on the course of art in Israel, they were nonetheless considered at the time to be on the fringes of mainstream art, which was mostly figurative and often bearing explicit Jewish and Zionist messages. This explicitly nationalist trend in Israeli art was denounced by its opponents as "regionalism". New Horizon critics, who maintained that art was international and universal, were opposed by the ideology of the Bezalel School at the time. Mordechai Ardon, head of Bezalel, wrote in 1954, "Every artist, like every citizen, must serve his country in heart and in soul".

New Horizons artists, too, despite their avowed adherence to a philosophy of universality, often expressed in their works sentiments of nationalism, Zionism, and socialism. For example, Zaritsky, one of the leading ideologues of the universalist school, produced series of paintings focusing on Israeli kibbutzim - his series "Yehiam", and a similar series on Naan (a kibbutz in central Israel), 1950–1952. Both these series include abstractions of the Israeli landscape. Zvi Meirovich one of the founders of New Horizons produced a series of large oil paintings called Mizpe Ramon focusing on the Israeli deseret. Sculptor Dov Feigin produced "Wheat Sheaves" in 1956, and Dadaist Janco painted "Soldiers", "Air raid Alarms" and "Maabarot" (jerry-built communities housing new Jewish immigrants in the 1950s). Some of the New Horizons artists belonged to the "Center for Advanced Culture" run by the Socialist-Zionist youth movement "Hashomer Hatzair". This activity culminated in the founding of the artists' village Ein Harod by a group of artists headed by Janco. There, Janco hoped to found a new socialist and artistic utopia.

Mordechai Ardon's work stands out from that of other New Horizons artists for dealing with the mystical and historical, rather than concentrating on the present. His canvases often depict episodes from Jewish history, from Biblical scenes to the Holocaust. In 1965 Raffi Lavie founded a group called "10+", which sought an alternative to the "lyric abstraction" of the New Horizons group.

== Group members ==
- Pinchas Abramovich
- Mordechai Arieli
- Arie Aroch
- Robert Baser
- Moshe Castel
- Itzhak Danziger
- Kosso Eloul
- Dov Feigin
- Marcel Janco (Iancu)
- Aharon Kahana
- Chaim Kiewe
- Avigdor Renzo Luisada
- Zvi Meirovich
- Avraham Naton (Natanson)
- Avshalom Okashi
- Moshe Propes
- Shmuel Raayoni
- Yechiel Shemi
- Avigdor Stematsky
- Moshe Sternschuss
- Yehezkel Streichman
- Jacob Wexler
- Ruth Zarfati
- Joseph Zaritsky
- Gila Blass

== Exhibitions ==
- Painters and Sculptors Pavilion, Jerusalem, 23 November 1949 – 23 December 1949
- Tel Aviv Museum of Art, 11 January 1953 – 12 January 1953
- Tel Aviv Museum of Art, 22 March 1955 – 22 April 1955
- Tel Aviv Museum of Art, 5 June 1956 – 6 June 1956
- Museum for Modern Art, Haifa, 1957
- Tel Aviv Museum of Art, 1958
- Museum of Art, Ein Harod 13 July 2006
- Museum of Art, Ein Harod, 13 October 2009 – 11 November 2009
- Museum for Modern Art, Haifa, 27 December 2012 – 16 January 2013

== See also ==
- Israeli sculpture
- List of public art in Israel
- Visual arts in Israel
