= Visual arts in Israel =

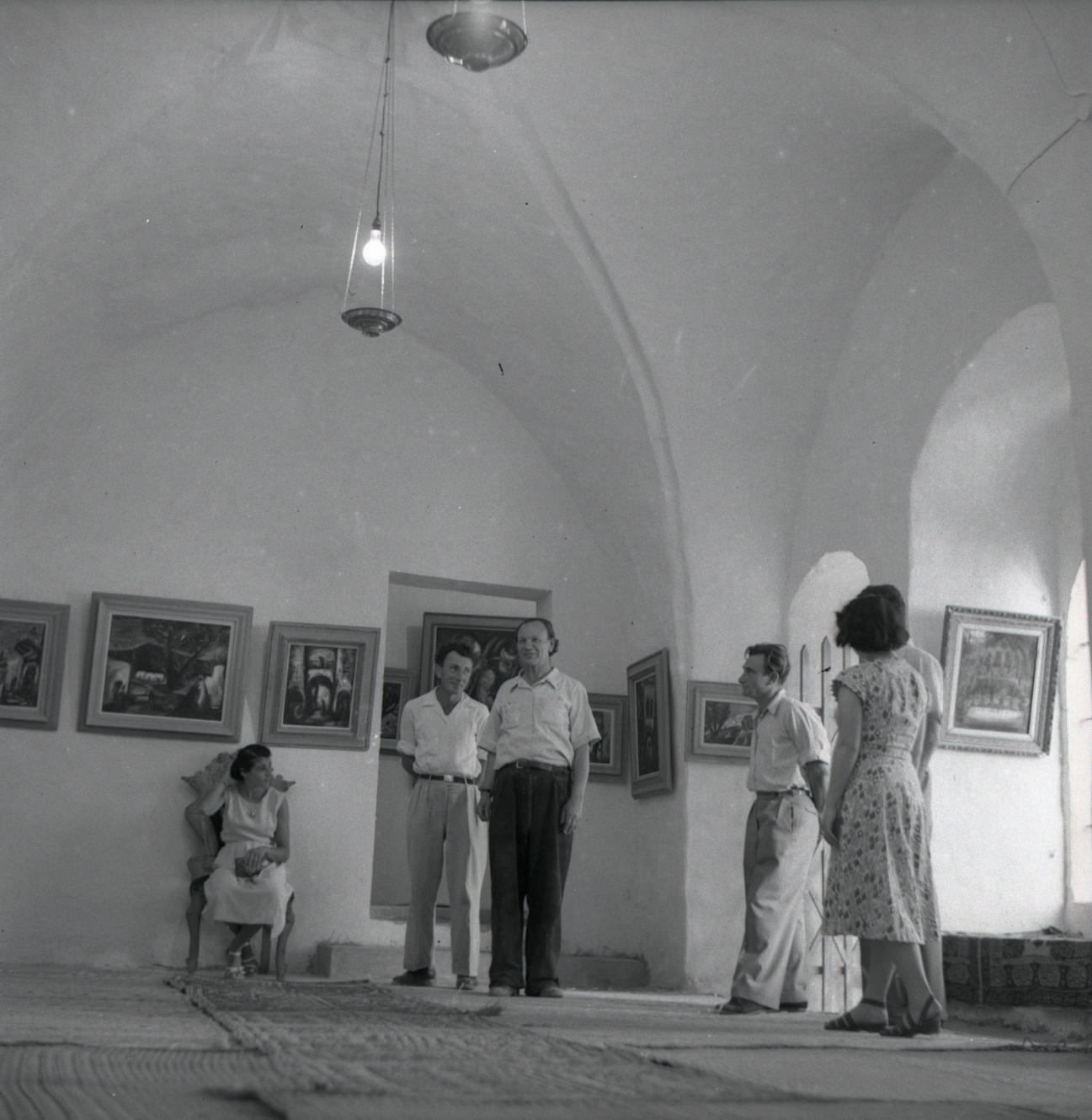
Artists in an exhibition in Safed's artists' quarter, 1952

Visual arts in Israel or Israeli art refers to visual or plastic arts created by Israeli artists or Jewish painters in the Yishuv. Visual art in Israel encompasses a wide spectrum of techniques, styles and themes reflecting a dialogue with Jewish art throughout the ages and attempts to formulate a national identity.

In 19th century Palestine, much of the art was decorative and sold to religious pilgrims and travelers. In the 1920s and 1930s, many Jewish painters fleeing pogroms in Europe settled in Tel Aviv. In 1925 Yitzhak Frenkel, also known as Alexandre Frenel, considered the father of Israeli modern art, brought to modern Palestine the influence of the École de Paris; by teaching and mentoring many of the nascent state's upcoming great artists. Furthermore, he along with other artists led the movement of Israeli artists to the Artist's Quarter of Tzfat leading to a golden age of art in the city during the 1950s, 1960s and 1970s.

After the destruction of Jewish communities in Europe during the Holocaust, Israel emerged as the center of Jewish art.

== 19th century – early 1900s ==
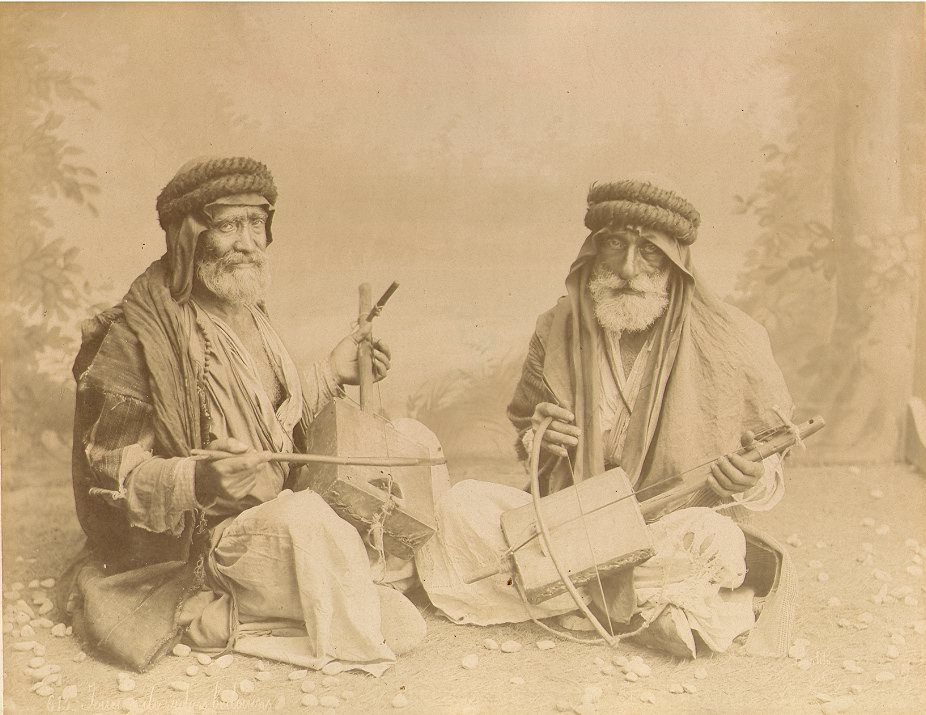
Félix Bonfils Beduin violin players, 1880s

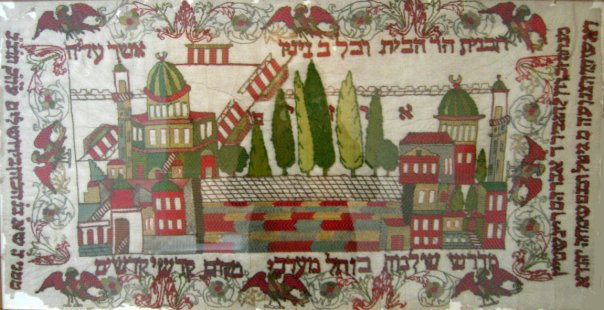
Temple mount map and buildings, late 19th century embroidery

Early art in 19th-century Palestine was mainly decorative art of a religious nature (primarily Jewish or Arab Christian), produced for religious pilgrims, but also for export and local consumption. These objects included decorated tablets, embossed soaps, rubber stamps, etc., most of which were decorated with motifs from graphic arts. In the Jewish settlements artists worked at gold smithing, silver smithing, and embroidery, producing their works in small crafts workshops. A portion of these works were intended to be amulets. One of the best known of these Jewish artists, Moshe Ben Yitzhak Mizrachi of Jerusalem made Shiviti (or Shivisi, in the Ashkenazic pronunciation, meditative plaques used in some Jewish communities for contemplation over God's name) on glass and amulets on parchments, with motifs such as the Sacrifice of Isaac, the Book of Esther, and views of the Temple Mount and the Western Wall. Objects of applied art were produced also at the "Torah ve-Melakhah" ("Torah and Work") school founded in 1882 by the Alliance Israélite Universelle. This school opened departments for the production of art objects in Neo-Classical and Baroque styles, produced by combining manual labor with modern machines.

A large body of artistic work was produced by European artists, primarily Christian painters, who came to document the sites and landscapes of the "Holy Land". The motive behind these works was orientalist and religious and focused on documentation – first of the painting and later of the photography – of the holy sites and the way of life in the Orient, and on the presentation of exotic people. Photographs of the Holy Land, which also served as the basis for paintings, focused on documenting structures and people in full daylight, due to the limitations of photography at that time. Therefore, an ethnographic approach is in evidence in the photographs, which present a static and stereotypical image of the figures they depict. In the photographs of the French photographer Felix Bonfils, for instance in his prominent photographs of the Holy Land in the last decades of the 19th century, we even see an artificial desert background, in front of which his figures are posed. At the end of the 19th century and the beginning of the 20th century, local photographers began to appear, the most important of whom is Khalil Raad, who focused on an ethnographic description of the reality of the Holy Land, in large part colonial. Russia-born Shlomo Narinsky arrived in the Holy Land in 1906 and photographed it in a romantic, pictorial, aesthetising style, with a focus on its oriental and biblical aspects. Narinsky made portraits of personalities like Eliezer Ben-Yehuda as well as of traditional-looking Bedouin, Yemenite and Ashkenazi Jews, and of female beauties. Pictures taken by him between 1910 and 1921 were published as postcards by the Jamal Brothers, complete with captions in English, Hebrew and Arabic.

== Art of "The Land of Israel", 1906–1932 ==
=== Bezalel ===
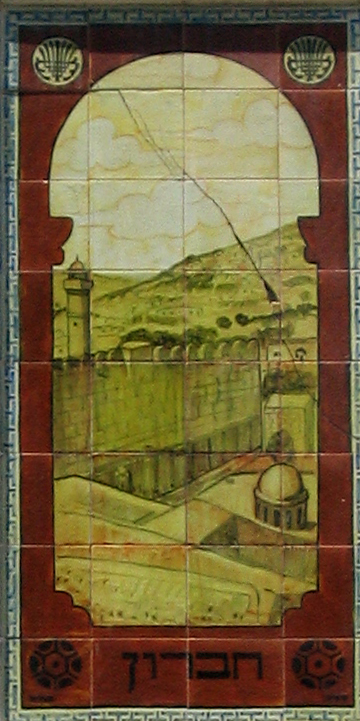
"Hebron", homemade glazed tiles made at the ceramics workshop at Bezalel

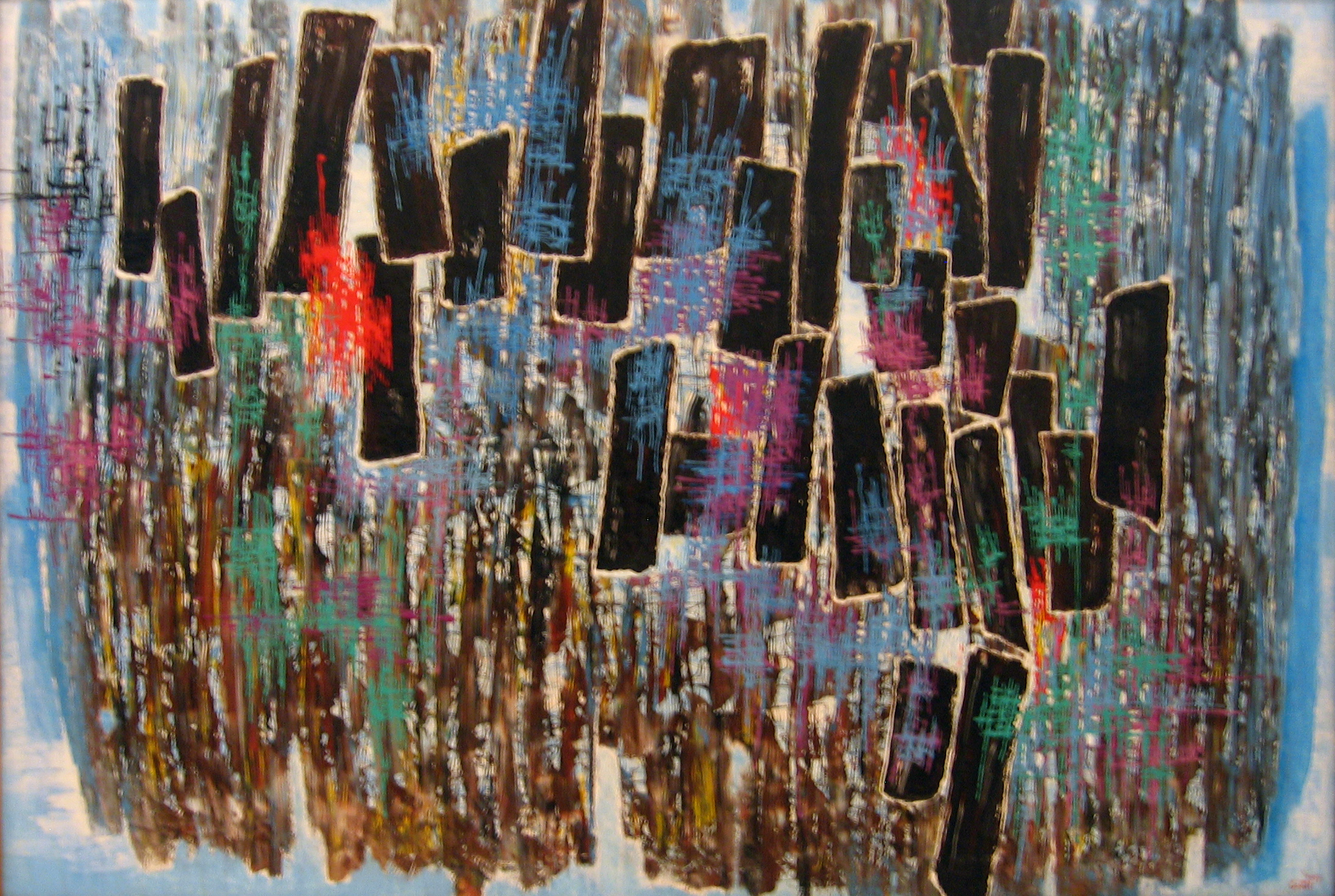
Hallelujah, Moshe Castel

Until the beginning of the 20th century no tradition of fine arts existed in Palestine although European artists came as visitors and painted the "Holy Land". Artists and craftsmen of Judaica objects and other applied arts made up the majority of artists working in the Land of Israel. Although the "Bezalel School of Arts and Crafts," known as "Bezalel", was not the first art school established in the Jewish settlement, its importance in setting the boundaries of the tradition of modern art in Palestine was very great indeed, and it is customary to view its establishment as the beginning of Israeli art. The school was founded in 1906 by Boris Schatz with the support of heads of Jewish and Zionist institutions. At Bezalel emphasis was placed on objects of applied art with a metaphysical dimension.

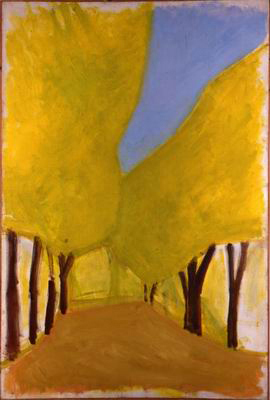
Carob tree boulevard, Ori Reisman

At the art school the influence of European Art Nouveau was in evidence, in addition to other social movements such as the British "Arts and Crafts" movement. In the logo of the quarterly magazine "Yalkut Bezalel", designed by Ze'ev Raban, we see within the ornate frame cherubs with a painter and a sculptor on each side and a lamp maker and a rug weaver next to them. Under the illustration is the caption "Work is the fruit; art is the bud; art without a soul is like prayer without conviction".

Alongside the art school, within its different tracks, studios opened for the production of jewelry, tapestries, paintings and Jewish ceremonial objects that were sold in Jerusalem shops. Schatz's vision included the idea of cross pollination between the various parts of the institution. "There is a practical side to the study of art", Schatz wrote, "The school always needs new drawings for the rugs and silver artifacts. Thus we need a series of artists who have absorbed the prevailing spirit of the school within their art, having studied with the expert teacher who embodies this spirit".

In the art created in Bezalel during this period Jewish and religious motifs dominate, for example, descriptions of the holy places, scenes from the Diaspora, etc. The works are decorative and heavily engraved in the "Eastern" style. The descriptions sought a connection between the Biblical period, the Return to Zion [from the Babylonian exile] and the Hasmonean Kingdom of Israel [140–37 BC], and the Zionist aspirations for the development of a Jewish settlement, driven by ideological and Zionist sentiments. The artists did this by borrowing historical motifs they perceived as "Jewish" motifs and designs they perceived as "Eastern". Typography occupied a central place in their designs. Sometimes the text even became the main element in their compositions.

The work of Schatz himself consisted mostly of small-scale sculptures of Jewish subjects, as well as reliefs and memorial plaques in honor of various Zionist leaders. His most famous sculpture is Mattathias (1894), which was influenced by Renaissance sculpture and in particular by the sculpture of Donatello. A different spirit entirely brought Samuel Hirszenberg, to the institution to join the Bezalel teaching staff. Hirszenberg brought European academic painting to Bezalel, and painted Jewish subjects within this framework. The artist Ze'ev Raban created many graphic works in the spirit of Art Nouveau, also known as "Jugendstil" ["Youth Style" in German]. The subjects of these works were "Orientalist" landscapes of the Holy Land and figures from the Bible drawn in the Neoclassical style. Among other well-known artists who taught at Bezalel were Ephraim Moses Lilien, Arnold (Aaron) Lachovsky, Adolf Behrman, Shmuel Levi (Ophel), and others.

Due to financial difficulties and political infighting the school closed in 1929. The museum, which housed many works of art, remained in the Bezalel building. This collection eventually served as the basis for the Art Wing of the Israel Museum in Jerusalem.

=== Land of Israel modernism movement ===
At the beginning of the 20th century some of the Bezalel students began to rebel against the rigid artistic tradition that was followed in the institution and turned to more "subjective" art. This period is often called the "Tower of David Period." One of the most prominent of these artists was the sculptor Avraham Melnikov. Melnikov suggested a different formal approach, culled from within the art of the Ancient East. This approach was offered as a replacement for the European art forms that dominated Bezalel during the reign of Schatz and Lilien.

The monument "The Roaring Lion" which Melnikov erected at Tel Hai, in memory of the battle of Tel Hai designed in the "Assyrian-Mesopotamian" style, reflected Melnikov's aesthetic ideal. "For many generations", Melnikov asserted, "the Jews were cut off from the figurative tradition in art; there are many ways to express artistic taste, but the taste that was in fashion was European art based on Greek and Roman culture, and as long as Athens was the inspiration for art in Europe, the Jew was instinctively excluded from it".

Other young artists offered alternative artistic approaches, turning to modern art, of which Schatz and Melnikov strongly disapproved. This showed up also in the exhibitions they organized. In 1920, for example, the "Hebrew Artists Association" was formed; it organized the annual exhibition, and during the years 1923 to 1928 held an "Exhibition of Land of Israel Artists" in the Tower of David in Jerusalem's Old City, organized by Joseph Zaritsky, Shmuel (Ophel) Levy, Melnikov, and others. In these exhibitions art in the "Bezalel Art" style were exhibited next to art influenced by the European Post-Impressionist and Expressionist styles. Other exhibitions of Modern Art were held in the hut attached to the Ohel theater in Tel Aviv between 1926 and 1929.

Another organization of Israel artists was called "Egged" (Amalgamation) and included artists such as Arieh (Leo) Lubin, Pinchas Litvinovsky, Sionah Tagger, Chana Orloff, Yossef Zaritsky, Chaim Gliksberg, Reuven Rubin, Arieh Allweil, and Nachum Gutman. Some of its members, like Orloff and Tagger, displayed influences from French Cubism in their works. The group held an exhibition in 1929 in an apartment on Allenby Street in Tel Aviv, opposite the Mograbi Cinema. Another exhibition of modern art was held in 1930 in the Tel Aviv Museum of Art and was called "The Beginnings of Modernism in Israeli Painting, 1920–1930".

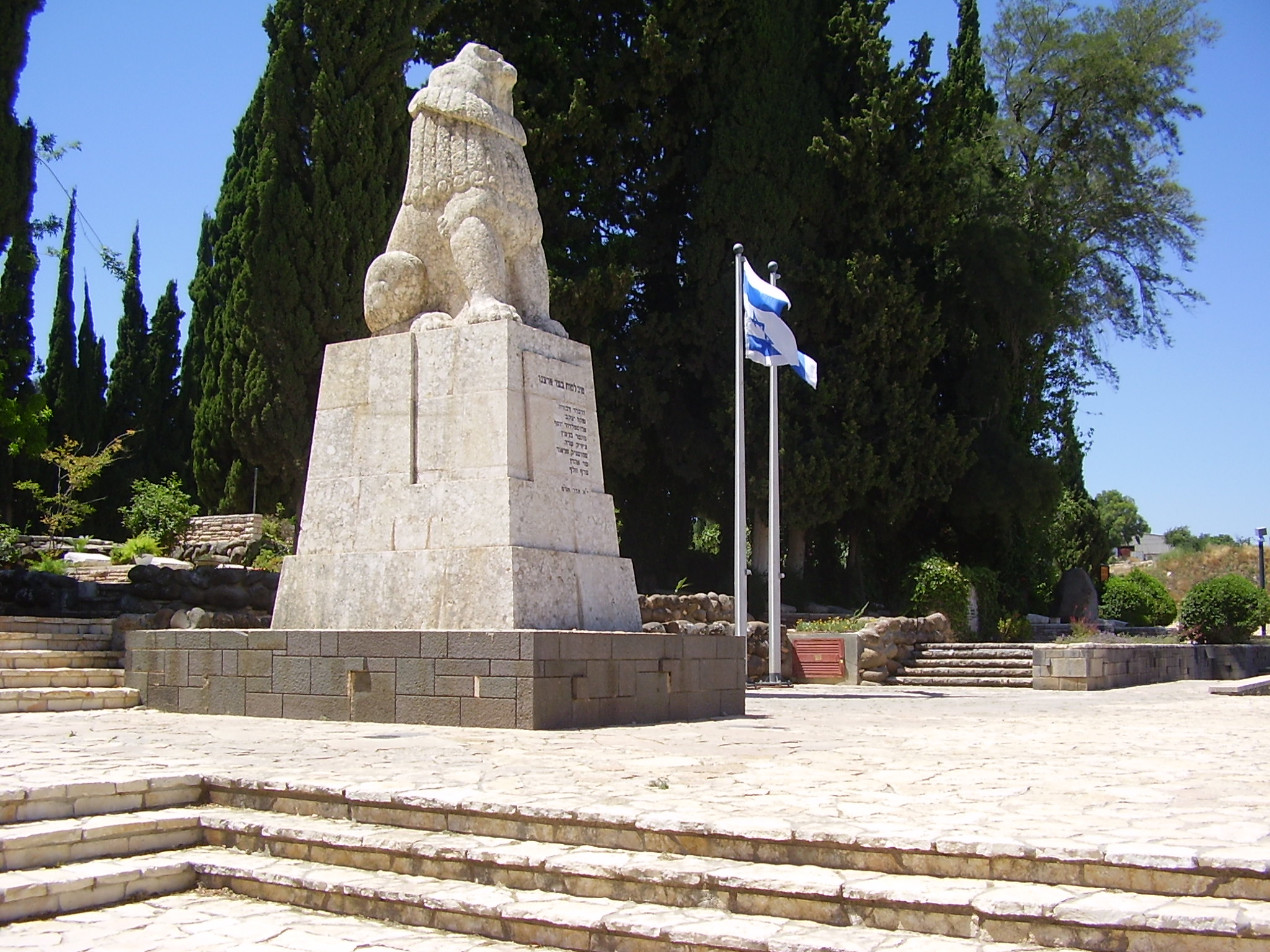
Avraham Melnikov The Roaring Lion, 1928–1934 Tel Hai

To a significant extent the modern painters began to create a "Hebrew" version of Post-Impressionist painting using a palette of light colors, an attraction to expressive brushstrokes, and a tendency toward naïve, flat painting. In addition to traditional subjects such as portraits, many artists depicted the Land of Israel in landscapes that added a romantic perspective to their subjects. This style of these works is sometimes called the "Land of Israel School".

Among the artists identified with this style, the artist Nachum Gutman stands out. Gutman painted many depictions of the city of Tel Aviv, but also of the country's Arab citizens, many of whom he met with in Jaffa. His famous painting "Resting at Noon" (1926) depicts Fellahin (Arab farmers) resting in the field from their day's labor. An examination of Gutman's style in these years shows a tendency toward the simplification of forms, in the tradition of expressive painting, and toward the use of strong colors. Some critics feel that this naïve style of painting reveals Gutman's romantic approach towards the landscapes of the Land of Israel and its Arab inhabitants.

This approach is also typical of other artists of this period. Sionah Tagger, for example, created a description of the "Railway Crossing at Herzl Street" (1920) in an expressive style that emphasized the modernity of the new Hebrew city. Israel Paldi (Feldman) depicted scenes of the half-empty country in a palette of bright shades and colors. Another artist, Abel Pann, expressed this romantic approach by focusing on subjects from the Bible depicted in illustrations that were fantastic in style.

Reuven Rubin also frequently depicted Jewish life in Mandatory Palestine. For example, in "Sophie, Bukharin Jewess" (1924) and "Dancers from Miron" (1926) his tendency towards flatness and a decorative style stand out, showing the influence of modern art and even of Art Nouveau. In "First Fruits" (1923) Rubin presents figures typical of the 1920s, interwoven with a powerful fantastic element. As in other works of his from this period, in "First Fruits" he shows a worldview that combines Zionism and Orientalism in one basket; thus, he depicts Jews and Arabs, pioneer couples and immigrants from Yemen and Bedouin shepherds in their native dress holding fruit: a pomegranate, oranges, a watermelon, and bunch of bananas. And next to them local animals: goats and a camel.

In spite of his distance from the center of artistic activity in Mandatory Palestine, the works of Hermann Struck, who immigrated to the region in 1922, when he was already a mature artist with a worldwide reputation, also display some of the iconographic characteristics of visual art in Palestine. Palm trees and empty landscapes are central themes of his work. Along with paintings of the city of Jerusalem and its residents the special Land of Israel light, which so preoccupied its young artists, is translated in his prints into a sharp contrast which emphasizes the dark images on the light background.

=== Armenian ceramic art ===
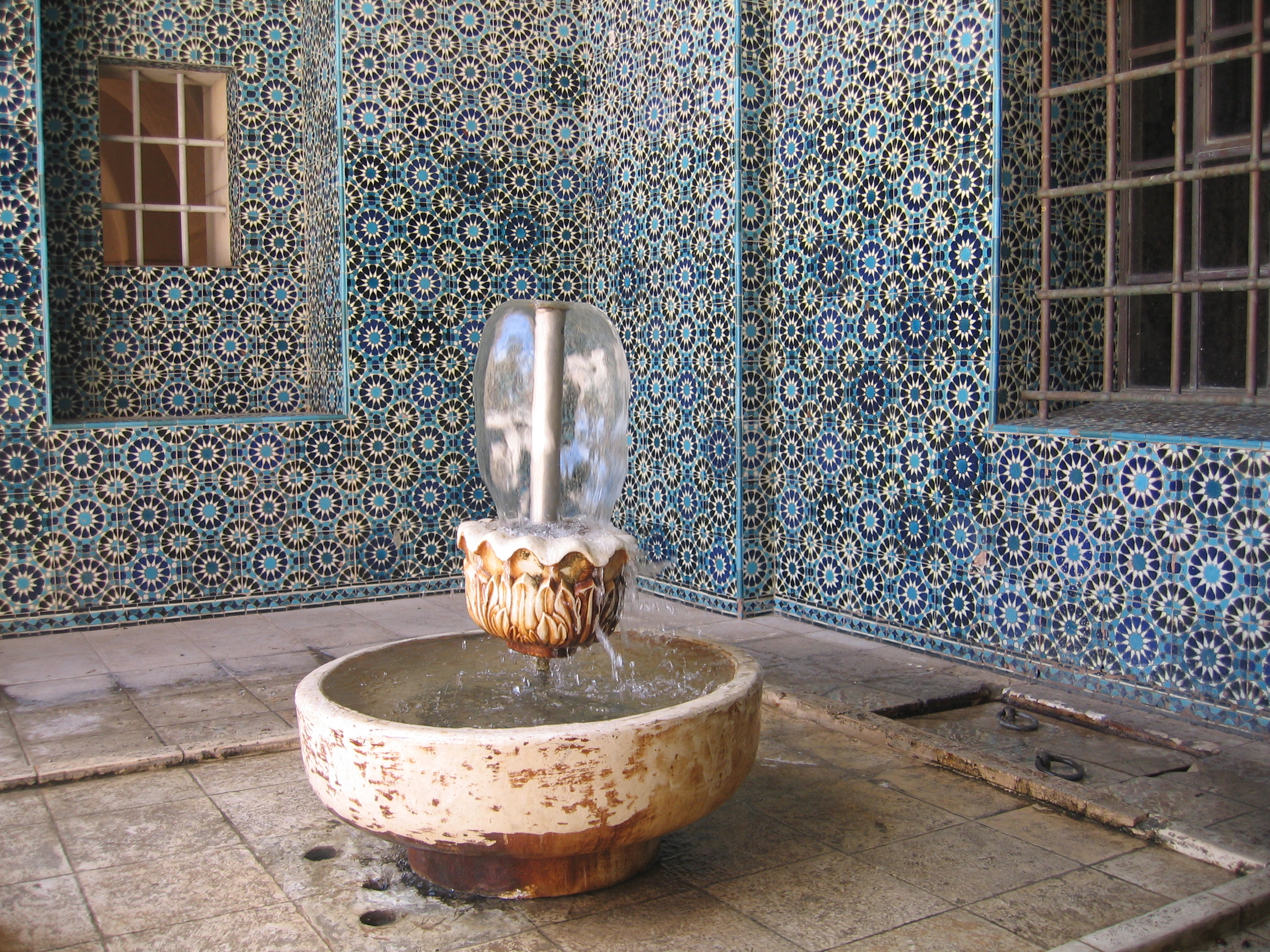
Rockefeller Museum

In 1919 the British Mandate government extended an invitation to a group of Armenian artists, survivors of the Armenian genocide, to renovate the tiles of the Dome of the Rock. This experiment reflected the British interest in traditional art in the spirit of the Arts and Crafts Movement. Armenian ceramic art began in the 15th century in the Turkish cities of Iznik and Kutahya, but the encounter with ancient Land of Israel art and with Christian motifs gave rise to a unique artistic synthesis.

The central artist during these first years was David Ohannessian (1884–1953), who specialized in decorative ceramics for structures and monuments, many of them at the invitation of the British government. Among the principal works Ohannessian created in Jerusalem were: tiles for the American Colony Hotel (1923), the fountain base for Saint John Eye Hospital Group, the domed entry of the Rockefeller Museum, etc. Among the motifs appearing in his decorations are cypress trees, tulips, and grapevines, all of which are typical of traditional Ottoman art. As he transplanted his art to Jerusalem and continued to develop it, he added images inspired by the local traditions and Armenian illuminated manuscripts—frequently using the Bird Mosaic in objects and tile panels.

The artists Megherdich Karakashian and Neshan Balian, who in 1922 left Ohannessian's studio and founded a joint workshop, developed an independent style in which figurative images foreign to traditional Turkish art appeared. For example, the two of them used imagery from ancient mosaics found in the Land of Israel, such as the Bird Mosaic from a 6th-century Armenian chapel or the mosaic from Hisham's Palace. Often these images were imbued with a Christian theological interpretation. Their joint workshop remained active until 1964, when Stepan Karakashian and Marie Balian, the heirs of the founding artists, set up two independent workshops that both used designs that had been developed in the past and created some new ones of their own.

== Modern art, the School of Paris and Tel Aviv ==
With Isaac Frenkel's return from Paris in 1925, he opened the Histadrut's art studio in Tel Aviv. There he would teach students the techniques he learned in France and spread the message of Parisian modernism. Several of these students would in their day become some of the leading artists in Israel. Furthermore, several art students from Bezalel such as Moshe Castel and Avigdor Stematsky during the weekends studied at Frenkel's studio, thus they too were immersed in the new light of French art. With the rise of the new modern art, Tel Aviv became in time the focal point of Israeli art and culture in Jerusalem's place. Students that learned in the Tel Aviv studio include David Hendler, Ori Reisman, Yechezkel Streichman, Arie Aroch, Shimshon Holzman, Mordechai Levanon, Joseph Kossonogi, Genia Berger and others.

The School of Paris's influence on the art of the Yishuv was especially marked from 1925 until the late 40s, with the use of browns and the painting of rural Israeli paintings as though they were in the countryside of southern France. Others took inspiration from the Jewish artists of the School Of Paris such as Chaim Soutine, Kikoine, Pascin, Chagall and others. Following their studied in Frenkel's studio, many of the young artists were encouraged by their teacher to venture to France and specifically Paris. Paris at the time was the center of the cultural world and specifically the artistic world and people of culture of every nationality left for Paris. and study there, thus a wave of Israeli artists studied in Paris, specifically in the Montparnasse quarter, and would then return to Israel several years later bringing back with them the influence of French art and specifically that of Jewish Parisian Expressionism. In characteristic of Jewish Parisian Expressionism, the art was dramatic and even tragic, perhaps in connection to the suffering of the Jewish soul.

One of the main themes of the Ecole de Pairs was portrayal of humanity, and the emotion evoked through human facial expression. Much of the art produced was in a way an antithesis to the agricultural spirit of the Zionist movement at the time, although it was not done deliberately. Art focused extensively on Tel Aviv and its bohemian café culture, on nudes, people in European middle class attire; in stark difference to the agricultural pioneer image. Furthermore, in the 1930s sometimes the painters would paint scenes in Israel in an Impressionist style and in a Parisian light, dimmer and more grey, in contrast to the powerful Mediterranean Sun. This was also reflected in the works of artists who formerly painted the scenes of the orient in a strong light who in that period switched to a more European color palete.

== Between East and West: The 1930s and 1940s ==
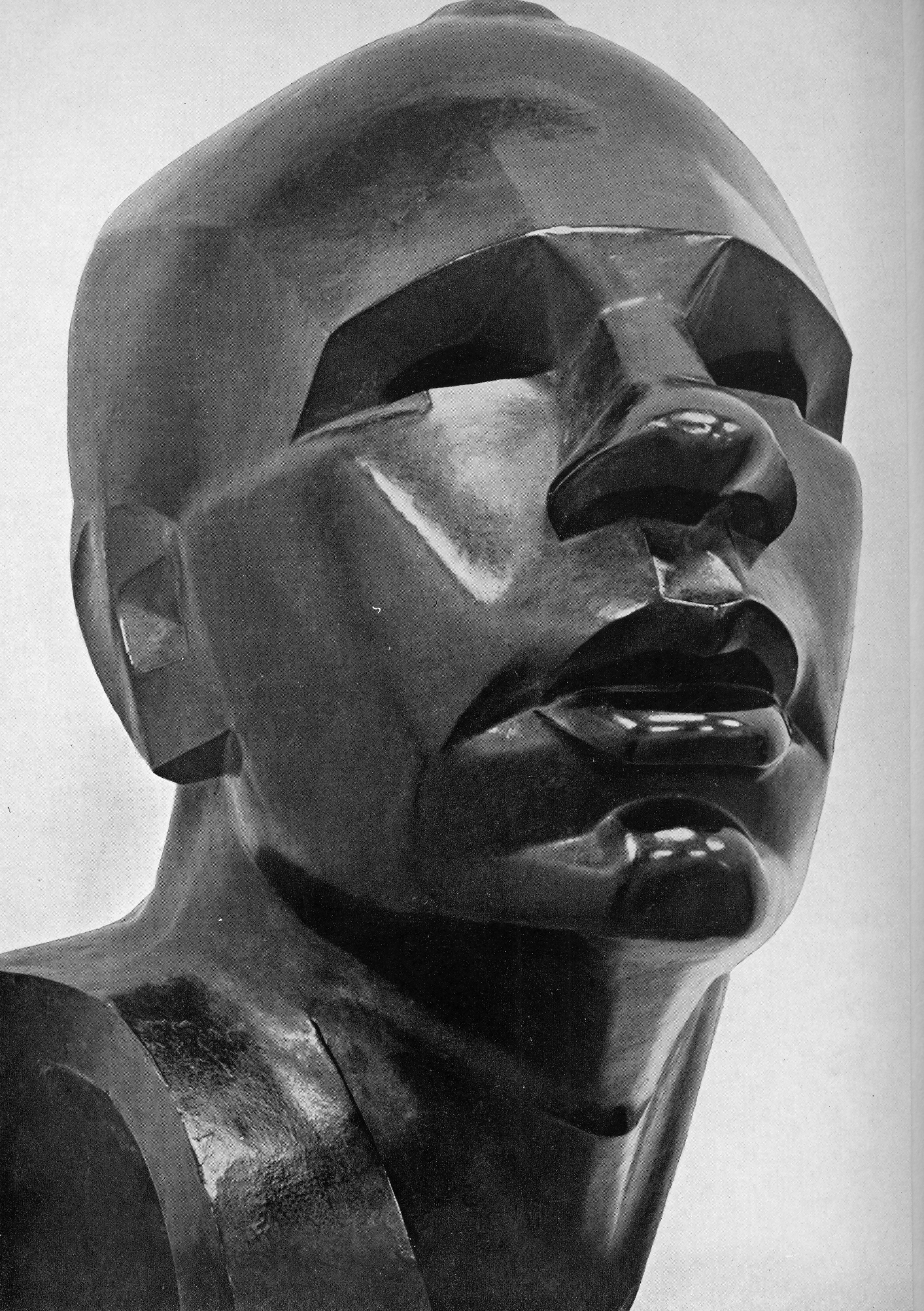
Zeev Ben Zvi, Aharon Meskin

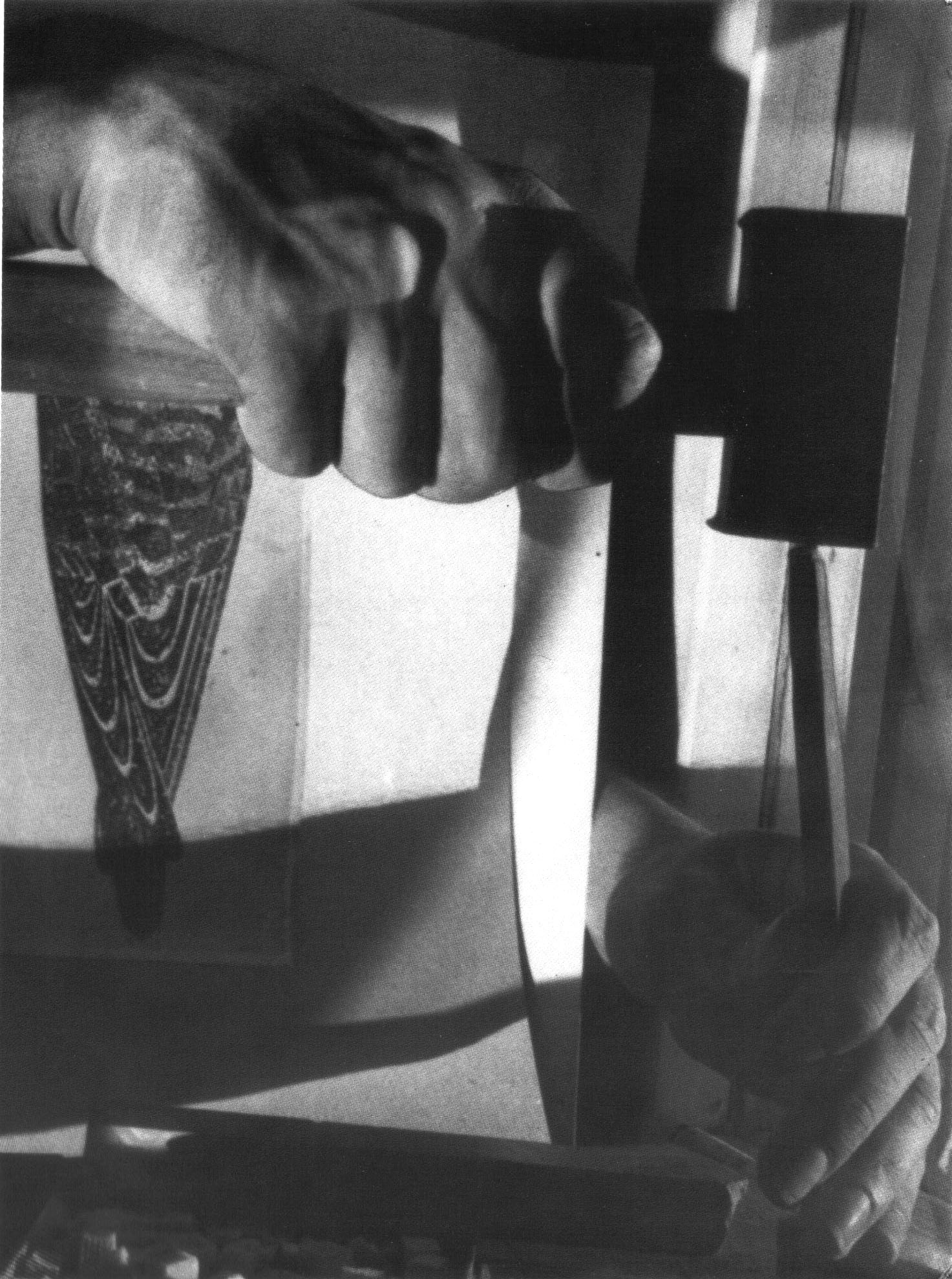
Helmar Lerski, Human hands, 1933–1940

The return of Jewish artists from Europe in the 1930s to Mandatory Palestine gave rise to a variety of influences from modern art on art in the Land of Israel. At the same time these influences did not motivate the artists toward Avant garde and abstract art in their painting and sculpture. (Note: For a distinction between avant garde in an artistic and in a political sense, see Peter Berger, Theory of the Avant Garde (Rasling, Tel Aviv).) Two of the strongest influences were French art and German art. Gideon Efrat claimed that these influences created two different trends in the plastic arts. While the "Parisian" influence was expressed in a "dynamic softness that melts heavy structures", German art and the "New Objectivity" (Neue Sachlichkeit) which brought with it a static and sculptured monumentality.

The most typical influence of the European avant garde is evident in international architectural styles in Mandatory Palestine, brought by architects who were graduates of the "Bauhaus". The considerable influence of French realism can also be found in the works of a group of artists who were influenced by the trend towards realism of French sculptors of the beginning of the 20th century, such as Auguste Rodin, Aristide Maillol, and others. This symbolic message in content and form appears also in the works of artists of the Land of Israel group, such as Moses Sternschuss, Rafael Chamizer, Moshe Ziffer, Joseph Constant (Constantinovsky), and Dov Feigin, most of whom studied at some point in France.

One sculptor who was influenced by Cubism was Zeev Ben Zvi who, in 1928, after completing his studies at Bezalel, went to study in France. Upon his return he served for a short period as a teacher of sculptor at Bezalel, and at the "New Bezalel". In 1932 Ben Zvi had his first exhibit at the national antiquities museum, "Bezalel", and a year later he had an exhibit at the Tel Aviv Museum. Instead of making use of Cubism as a means of subverting the artistic object, Ben Zvi's sculptures use Cubism as a means of intensifying the feeling of monumentality of the image. In the work of artists such as Chana Orloff and Shalom Sebba as well, the Cubist language in which they shaped their works did not lead them to abandon the realism and the boundaries of traditional representation. In his well-known work, "The Fleece" (1947), for example, Sebba used the Cubist language to intensify the monumentality of his images, while using angles of observation inspired by photography.

Even more striking avant garde trends began to appear in the work of the Jewish photographers, most of whom were influenced by the German avant garde and the expressionists of the 1920s and 1930s. Photography in the land of Israel developed under the encouragement and guidance of the Zionist establishment, under the auspices of groups such as the Jewish National Fund, which commissioned photographs that would spread the Zionist message. Artists such as Zoltan Kluger, Yaakov (Jack) Rosner, and others, documented the Zionist enterprise and the Jewish settlement, sometimes using photographic angles, compositions, and views which took their inspiration from Soviet Communism in Russia. Other photographers sought to use these techniques for artistic or commercial photography.

Helmar Lerski created photographic portraits in typical expressionist style, expressed in his use of light and in the angle of the photograph. In 1936 Larski created 175 photographs of man, which attempted to encompass his personality in its entirety, using a technique called "metamorphosis by means of light"; this technique made use of mirrors, and he even taught it in workshops on the roof of his home in Tel Aviv. Another artist, Alfons Himmelreich (b. in Munich, 1904; aliyah in 1933; d. 1993), created advertising photographs which emphasized industrial commercialism by using a distortion of the usual standards, close ups, and light for emphasis, as a designer of commercialism. Among the photographers who worked in a more artistic tradition were Richard Levy (Ereel), who created photomontages of semi-abstract figures; Tim (Nahum) Gidal, and the sisters Charlotte and Gerda Meyer, who specialized in architectural photography.

The intensification of the Israeli-Palestinian dispute influenced the works of Arab photographers with a developed political consciousness, such as Ali Zaarur, Chalil Rissas, and others. They acted on their own or as agents of various information agencies, and created photographs in journalistic style. Only from the 1990s did researchers begin to investigate these works as part of historiography, and as the visual representation of the past, with political, ideological, and nationalistic goals in mind.

=== Canaanite movement ===
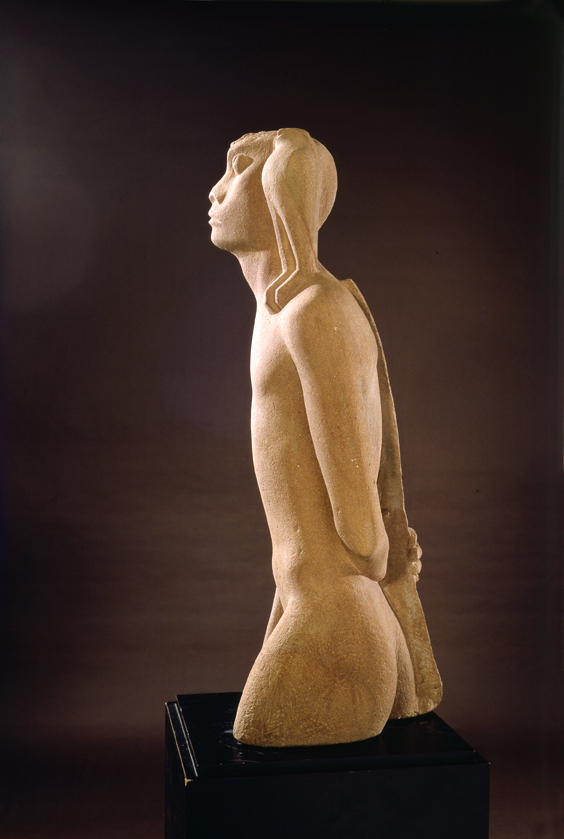
Itzhak Danziger Nimrod, 1939 The Israel Museum, Jerusalem Collection

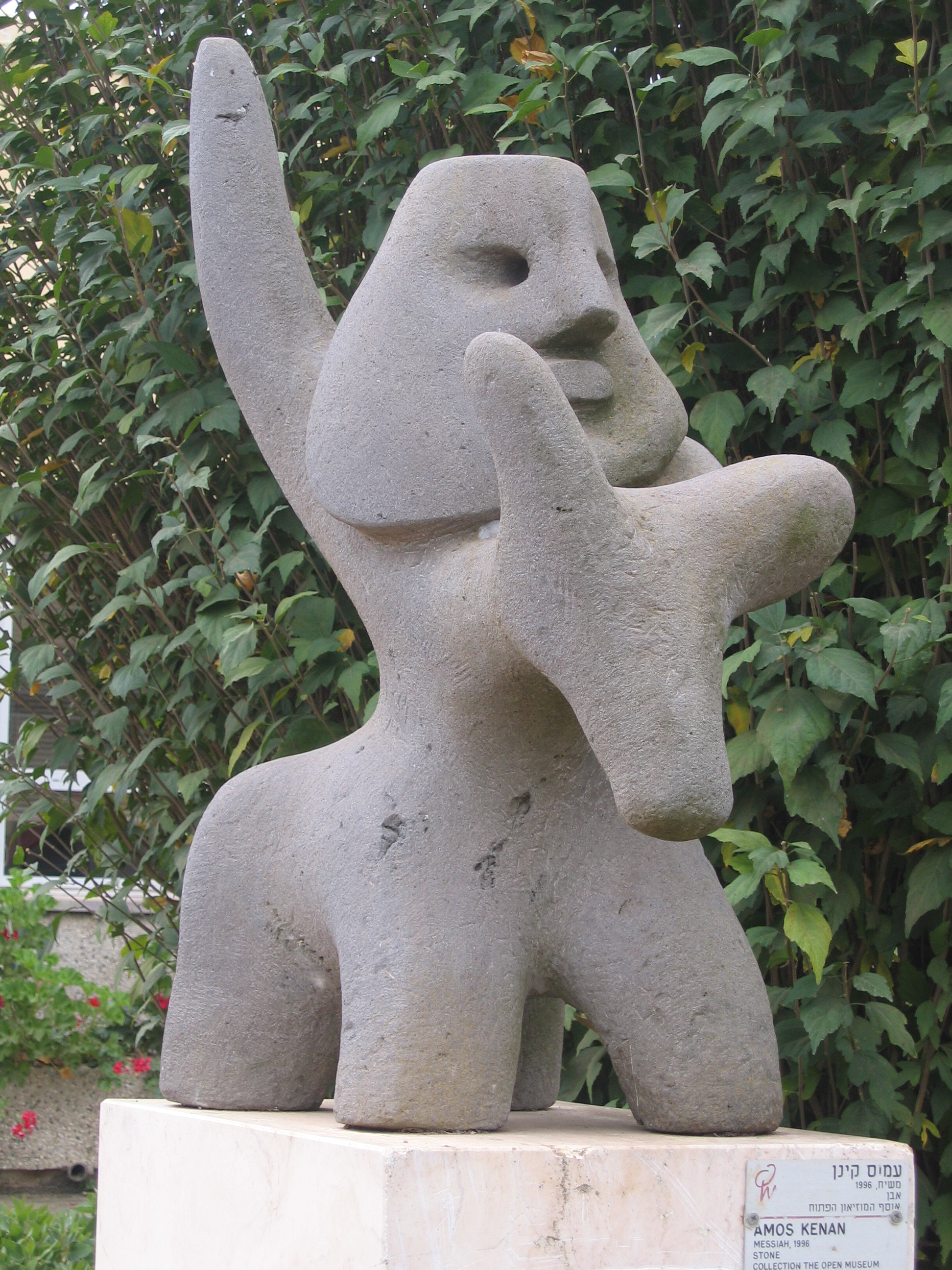
Amos Kenan Messiah, 1966 Tefen Open Museum

In 1943 the Israeli poet Yonatan Ratosh (1908–1981) published "Epistle to Hebrew Youth", the proclamation, the manifesto, the first written communication of "The Canaanites", a literary and artistic movement that had been active for some time. In this essay Ratosh called on Hebrew speaking youth to become a buffer against Judaism. He declared that between the youth that had settled in the Land of Israel and the Jews of the Diaspora there was no true connection. This became the characteristic cry of the Caananites, whose members proposed a return to the mythological past, to create a Hebrew–speaking nation with an independent identity.

The visual expression of this aspiration was the use of archaic forms and styles, under the influence of Fertile Crescent art. This tendency reflected, to a significant degree, the interest in primitive art and sculpture that was prevalent in Europe at the beginning of the 20th century. Often this pro-Archaic style was an expression of symbolism.

One of the most significant artists of the "Canaanite" movement was the sculptor Itzhak Danziger. He returned to Palestine in 1938 after studying in Britain, and demonstrated a new national outlook in his work which, in contrast to what was acceptable in Europe, was full of sensuality and Eastern exoticism. This art fit the feelings and sense of identity of much of the population of the Jewish settlement in the country. The dream of Danziger's contemporaries, writes Amos Keinan after Danziger's death, was "to unite with the land of Israel and the earth of which it is composed, to create a specific image with recognizable signs, something that is from here and is us, and to embed in history the mark of that something special that is us". In addition to nationalism, his sculptures demonstrated an expressionist-symbolist style similar in spirit to British sculpture of the same period.

Danziger opened a sculpture studio in the yard of his father's hospital in Tel Aviv, and there he critiqued and taught young sculptors such as Benjamin Tammuz, Kosso Eloul, Yechiel Shemi, Mordechai Gumpel, etc. In addition to his students, his studio became a popular meeting place for artists from other fields as well. In this studio Danziger created his first significant works, the sculptures "Nimrod" (1939) and "Shabazia" (1939). When "Nimrod" was unveiled it became the focus of an important dispute in Mandatory Palestinian Jewish cultural circles; the sculpture depicts the figure of Nimrod, the Biblical hunter according to Jewish religious literature, as a lean youth, naked and uncircumcised, a sword clutched in his hand and a falcon on his shoulder. The sculpture harked back to the earlier cultures of the Assyrians, the Egyptians, and the Greeks, while at the same time it showed similarities to the European sculpture of the time. The sculpture expressed a combination of homoerotic beauty and pagan idolatry. This combination was at the center of criticism in religious circles in the Jewish settlement. The criticism against "Nimrod" and the Canaanites was heard not only in religious circles, which objected to the pagan and idolatrous aspects of the work, but also in secular circles among those who objected to the rejection of "Jewishness". To a significant extent "Nimrod" intensified a dispute that had existed prior to its appearance. At the same time other voices called it the new model for the "New Jewish Man". The newspaper Boker [Morning] wrote in 1942 that "Nimrod is not just a sculpture. It is flesh of our flesh, spirit of our spirit. It is a milestone and it is a monument. It is the apotheosis of the vision and daring and youthful rebellion that distinguishes an entire generation...Nimrod will be young forever".

In spite of the fact that Danziger later had his reservations about "Nimrod" as a model for Israeli culture, many artists adopted the "Canaanite" style and point of view in their sculpture. Figures resembling idols and images in "primitive" style appeared in Israeli art until the 1970s. Furthermore, the influence of the Canaanite movement was evident in the art of the "New Horizons" group.

== The Artists' Quarter of Safed ==
During the 1950s, the 1960s and the 1970s Safed (Hebrew name: Tzfat) served as a beacon of inspiration for Israeli artists. Dozens of different artists including Yitzhak Frenkel Frenel, Alexander Bogen, Moshe Castel, Shalom Moskovitz, Rosentalis, Shimshon Holzman and others made their home in Tzfat (many of the artists used to spend the summer in the cooler Tzfat and the winter in warmer Tel Aviv, others such as Yitzhak Frenkel Frenel would commute between France and Tzfat/Tel Aviv). Several art movements made Safed their home, the most marked of these was the School of Paris, whose members included Isaac Frenkel, Moshe Castel, Mordechai Levanon and others.

=== Safed's Artistic Qualities ===
Safed had long attracted artists due to its mystical and romantic qualities. Safed was a hotbed of different themes for the Israeli artist. It presented a vision and diversity of tradition Jewish life, be it the Klezmer, the Sephardic or Ashkenazi communities, the Hassidic communities, the synagogues; whilst also due to its geography has a mountainous arrangement and a view toward Mount Meron. All of these brought many major and minor artists to travel and live in the ancient city; recognizing the artistic potential of city. Some have compared the artistic activity in Safed to that of the Barbizon group on the outskirt of Fontainbleu which attracted naturalist and impressionist painters.

Frenkel Frenel, Rolly Sheffer and other Israeli and Jewish artists were heavily inspired by the stunning panoramas and views that Tzfat offered them of Mt Meron, something that is very visible in their work. Tzfat, one of the four holy cities of Judaism provided a powerful emotional scenery to those artists who visited. Frenkel Frenel and others who were influenced by the Ecole de Paris showcased the mystics of Tzfat with the avantgarde movements they pertained to, painting with colors that reflect the dynamism and spirituality of the ancient city, painting the fiery or serene sunsets over Mt Meron. Marc Chagall would walk the streets and paint portraits of religious children.

=== History ===
The first artist to visit and work in Safed was Isaac Frenkel, arriving there in 1920 after having heard of it from passengers on the Ruslan. In the 1930s and 40s several of his former students also ventured to Safed, including Mordechai Levanon and Moshe Castel. Following the 1948 Palestine war, the Arab quarter was vacated and Tzfat decided to grant homes to Israel's great artists. In the late 1940s and early 1950s an Academy of Art was opened by Isaac Frenkel in his home, however due to financial difficulty it did not last. In the 1950s, Siona Tagger, Yosl Bergner and others painters not directly affiliated with the School of Paris settled in Safed for periods of time, specifically during the summer.

=== Art movements ===
Safed's Artists Quarter was not united by a common ideology, however there was a clear bastion of the Ecole de Paris artists who in Safed. Thus an art syle reminiscent of the Jewish Expressionism of Soutine, Kikoine and Pascin is evident. Safed was also the home of artists such as Alexander Bogen, Sionna Tagger and Moshe Ziffer who did not pertain to the art movement. Several painters of the Ofakim Hadashim movement painted and work in Safed, including Alexander Bogen, Castel, Stematsky, Streichman and others. Safed though a major theme in Israeli art was not recognized as a place which dictated the course of Israeli art from the 1950s onwards. Instead it is said that the art trends in Jerusalem and more importantly, Tel Aviv were the ones that steered Israeli art's development, according to this, Safed's artists' many of whom lived in Tel Aviv or Jerusalem during the winter, reflected these trends. Safed's golden age lasted until the 1970s.

==== Today ====
Although less active in modern times, there still remain several galleries in Tzfat that guard the old heritage of art in Safed, such as the Beit Castel gallery and the Frenkel Frenel Museum.

== Avant-garde: the 1950s and 1960s ==
In the 1950s and 1960s Israeli artists began exploring the idiom of the Avant-garde current in Europe and the United States. Immigrant artists brought trends to Israel, and influential Israeli artists spent stints in Europe, especially in France. Some of these artists sought a universal style, while others sought to develop a uniquely Israeli avant-garde, in the spirit of nationalistic socialism and Zionism.

=== New Horizons ===
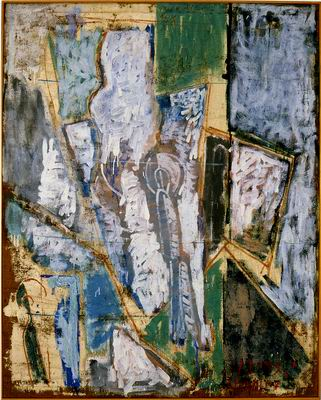
Joseph Zaritsky, Naan, The Painter and the Model, 1949, Israel Museum, Jerusalem

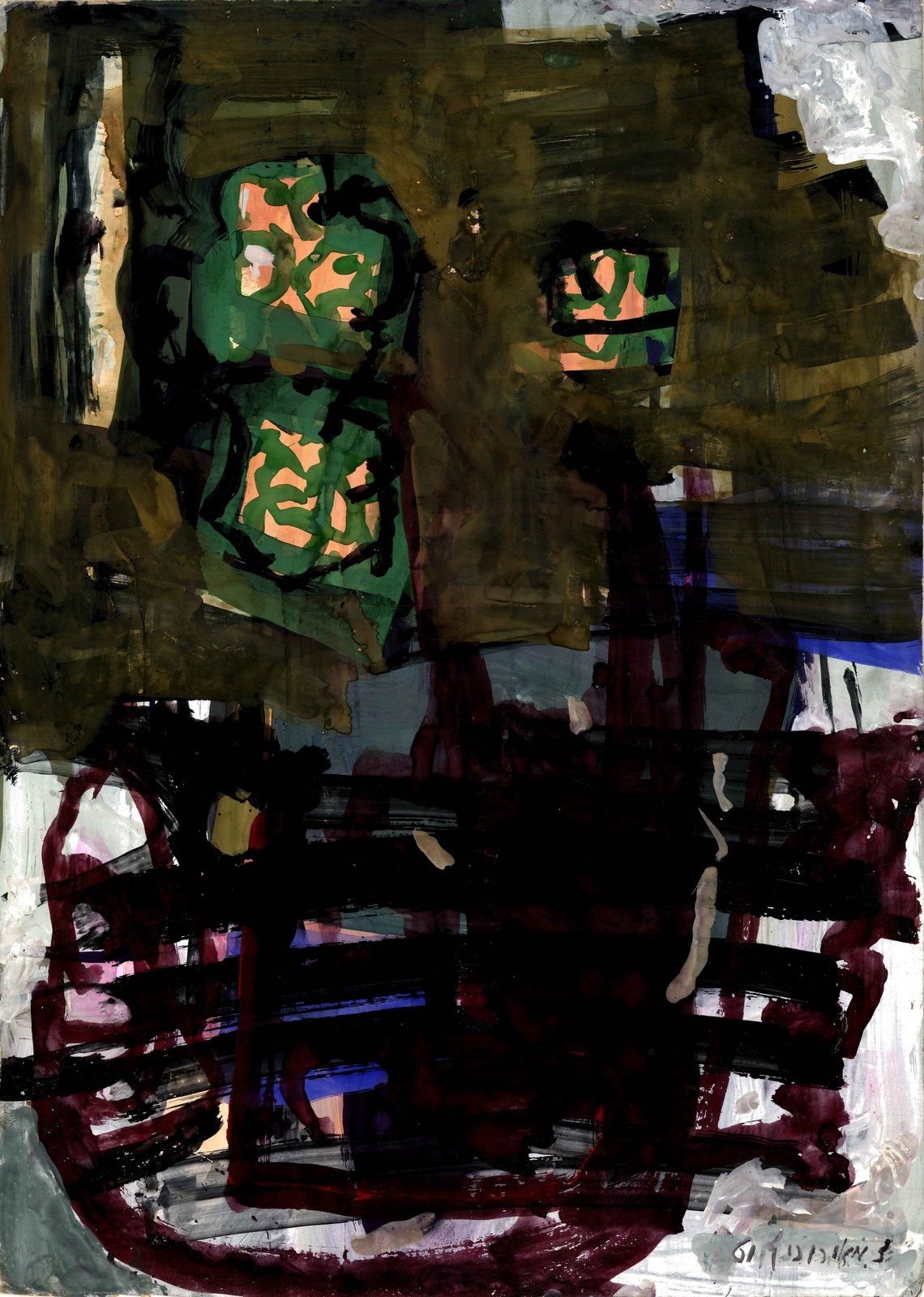
Zvi Meirovich, gouache, 1961

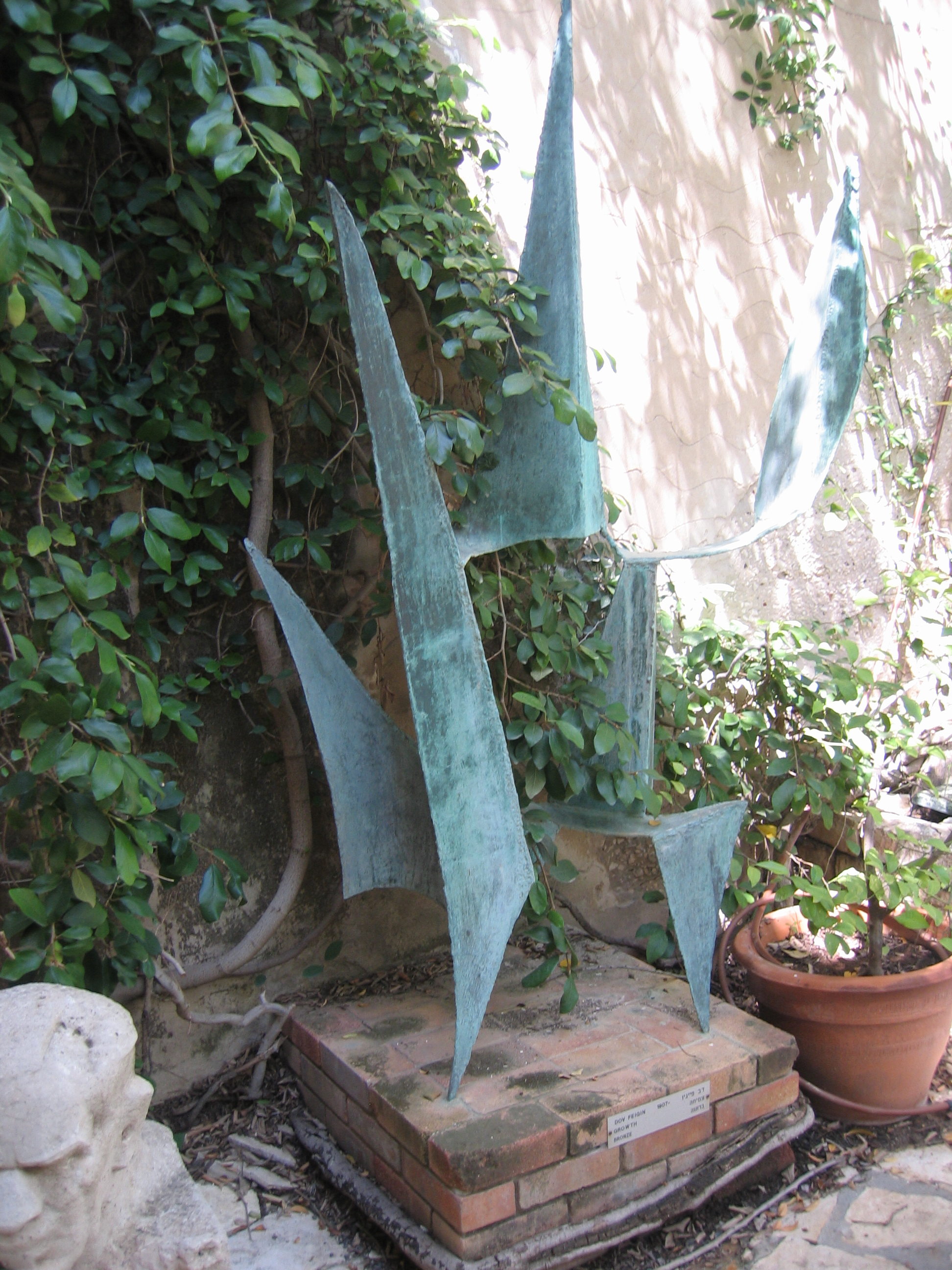
Dov Feigin, Growth, 1959, Mishkan Museum of Art, Ein Harod

The germination of the "New Horizons" ("Ofakim Hadashim") movement can be found in a group of artists who mounted an exhibition in Tel Aviv's Habima national theater in December 1942, under the name "the Group of Eight", But the group crystallized into the dominant artistic movement only after the founding of the state in 1948. Members of the school included Arie Aroch, Zvi Meirowitch, Avraham Naton (Natanson), Avigdor Stematsky and Yehezkel Streichman. The work of sculptor Dov Feigin also appeared in the catalog of the 1942 exhibition, though it was not displayed. In February 1947 five of the original members of the group joined Joseph Zaritsky for an exhibit called "The Group of Seven" at the Tel Aviv Museum of Art. Members of the group stated that "The group is based in modernism, especially French, yet seeks a unique style that expresses our own reality".

For these artists, this was not only a statement of philosophy, but a practical work plan. Zaritsky, who served as chairman of the League of Painters and Sculptors in the Land of Israel, opposed the league's philosophy of equality among artists. In 1948, at the time of the opening of the artists' house that was to become the League's permanent home, he was delegated to select works for the Bienniale in Venice. His selections caused such an outrage among the members that he was ousted from his position. He walked out with a group of artists, and founded an alternative movement, the "New Horizons". On 9 November 1948, the Tel Aviv Museum of Art opened the first exhibit bearing the movement's name. Among the artists showing were Pinchas Abramovich, Marcel Janco, Aharon Kahana, Yohanan Simon, Avshalom Okashi and Moshe Castel, as well as movement founders Zaritsky, Streichman and Feigin.

The group sought a style that reflected the striving for Zionism and Modernism. This style was largely dictated by the leading artists of the group – Zaritsky, Stematsky, Meirovich and Streichman. In practice, this style was a variant of European modernism. The style has been called "lyrical abstract", but in fact, there was little purely abstract art, but rather works rooted in the local visual landscape. This essentially figurative style was pushed toward the abstract by bold brush strokes, and a strong use of bright colors typical of the "Land of Israel" style, reflecting the strong Mediterranean light. Formats were generally rather small, and the style was similar to European abstract art before the second World War, akin to the art of Wassily Kandinsky, and unlike the abstract art prevalent in the United States at the time.

For example, in his series "Yehiam" (1949–1952), Zaritsky depicts scenes from the establishment of Kibbutz Yehiam in northern Israel. The early paintings in this series (mostly watercolors) depict the natural landscapes of the region, while the later paintings are (mostly oil) abstractions of these earlier scenes. This progression, contends art critic and curator Mordecai Omer, reflects Zaritsky's belief that external visual reality is the basis of artistic originality.

Zvi Meirovich, a prominent member of Okakim Hadashim, painted in the abstract lyric style, but unlike his colleagues he was more inclined to a German rather than a French palette. His bold use of black and reds particularly in the gouaches. The big breakthrough was in oil pastels, that only he made in large format. Using a deep space photo surface rather than a flat paper was pioneering moment.

Others in the group, however, deviated from this style. Marcel Janco, of international fame for his involvement in the Dada movement in Europe in the 1930s, did not adopt this approach to abstraction; rather his art uses European Cubist and Expressionist styles to create a Jewish-Zionist narrative. Moshe Castel, also, went through a transformation during the 1950s from abstraction to expressionism characteristic of the Canaanist movement.

In the field of sculpture, the group introduced new media. Yechiel Shemi, Dov Feigin, and, after a sojourn in Britain, Itzhak Danziger, introduced welded steel as a new medium. This new form freed these artists from the figurative character of stone and wood carving, for a more purely abstract oeuvre. Here, too, however, there is frequent reference to the Canaanite figurativeness and symbolism.

Indeed, during the 1950s, the "New Horizons" group tended more and more toward the abstract, and away from reliance on the figurative. Zaritsky led this shift, which was rooted in what he saw as a guiding ideology. Some members of the group, however, rejected this ideology, and eventually quit the movement. These included Janco, Alexander Bogen, Aharon Kahana and Yehiel Simon.

=== Realism and social art ===
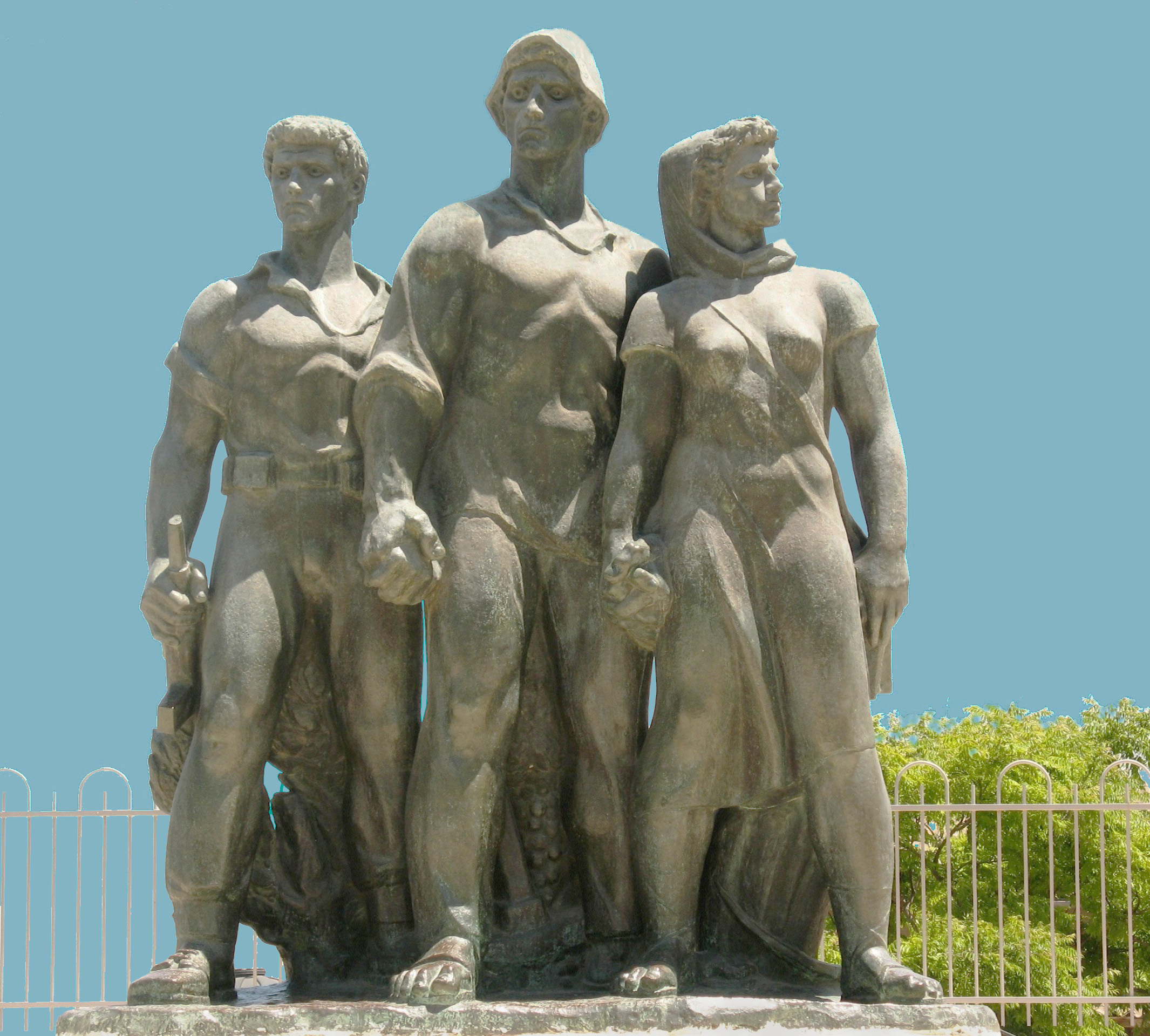
Monument at Kibbutz Negba (1953) by Natan Rapoport

While the abstract and secular works of the New Horizons group had profound influence on the course of art in Israel, they were nonetheless considered at the time to be on the fringes of mainstream art, which was mostly figurative and often bearing explicit Jewish and Zionist messages. This explicitly nationalist trend in Israeli art was denounced by its opponents as "regionalism". New Horizon critics, who maintained that art was international and universal, were opposed by the ideology of the Bezalel School at the time. Mordechai Ardon, head of Bezalel, wrote in 1954, "Every artist, like every citizen, must serve his country in heart and in soul". Artists like Simon Zabar, Moshe Gat, and Ruth Schloss created works that reflected national social tensions, a clearly socialist political slant, and glorification of the worker. Others, like Alexander Bogen, Naftali Bezem and Miron Sima, Moshe Bromberg (Bar-Am) depicted the dramatic events of the period – World War II and the Holocaust. Their works were explicitly Jewish, while adopting the styles of the European avant-garde of the early 20th century.

The quest for a connection between the artist and society is reflected also in the monumental works on the walls of public buildings that were commissioned beginning in the 1950s. Examples include the mosaics of Mordechai Gumpel on the walls of public buildings in Petach Tikva, Holon and elsewhere, that depict Jewish settlers building the nation, in a style drawing much on the Canaanists; or Yohanan Simon's mural of kibbutz youth at Kibbutz Gan Shmuel, showing youth living the socialist dream.

New Horizons artists, too, despite their avowed adherence to a philosophy of universality, often expressed in their works sentiments of nationalism, Zionism, and socialism. For example, Zaritsky, one of the leading ideologues of the universalist school, produced series of paintings focusing on Israeli kibbutzim – his series "Yehiam", and a similar series on Naan (a kibbutz in central Israel), 1950–1952. Both these series include abstractions of the Israeli landscape. Zvi Meirovich one of the founders of New Horizons produced a series of large oil paintings called Mizpe Ramon focousing on the Israeli deseret. Sculptor Dov Feigin produced "Wheat Sheaves" in 1956, and Dadaist Janco painted "Soldiers", "Air raid Alarms" and "Maabarot" (jerry-built communities housing new Jewish immigrants in the 1950s). Some of the New Horizons artists belonged to the "Center for Advanced Culture" run by the Socialist-Zionist youth movement "Hashomer Hatzair". This activity culminated in the founding of the artists' village Ein Hod by a group of artists headed by Marcel Janco. There, Janco hoped to found a new socialist and artistic utopia.

Mordechai Ardon's work stands out from that of other New Horizons artists for dealing with the mystical and historical, rather than concentrating on the present. His canvases often depict episodes from Jewish history, from Biblical scenes to the Holocaust. For example, his painting "Gate of Light" (1953), shows the tree of life, a symbol of great Biblical and Kabbalistic meaning, within a surrealistic landscape reminiscent of the work of Paul Klee and others.

Ever since, surrealism has played a significant role in Israeli art, and some of its most gifted and influential proponents include artists like Zeev Kun, Samuel Bak, Baruch Elron, Joel Tal-Mor, as well as Yosl Bergner.

=== Abstract art after New Horizons ===
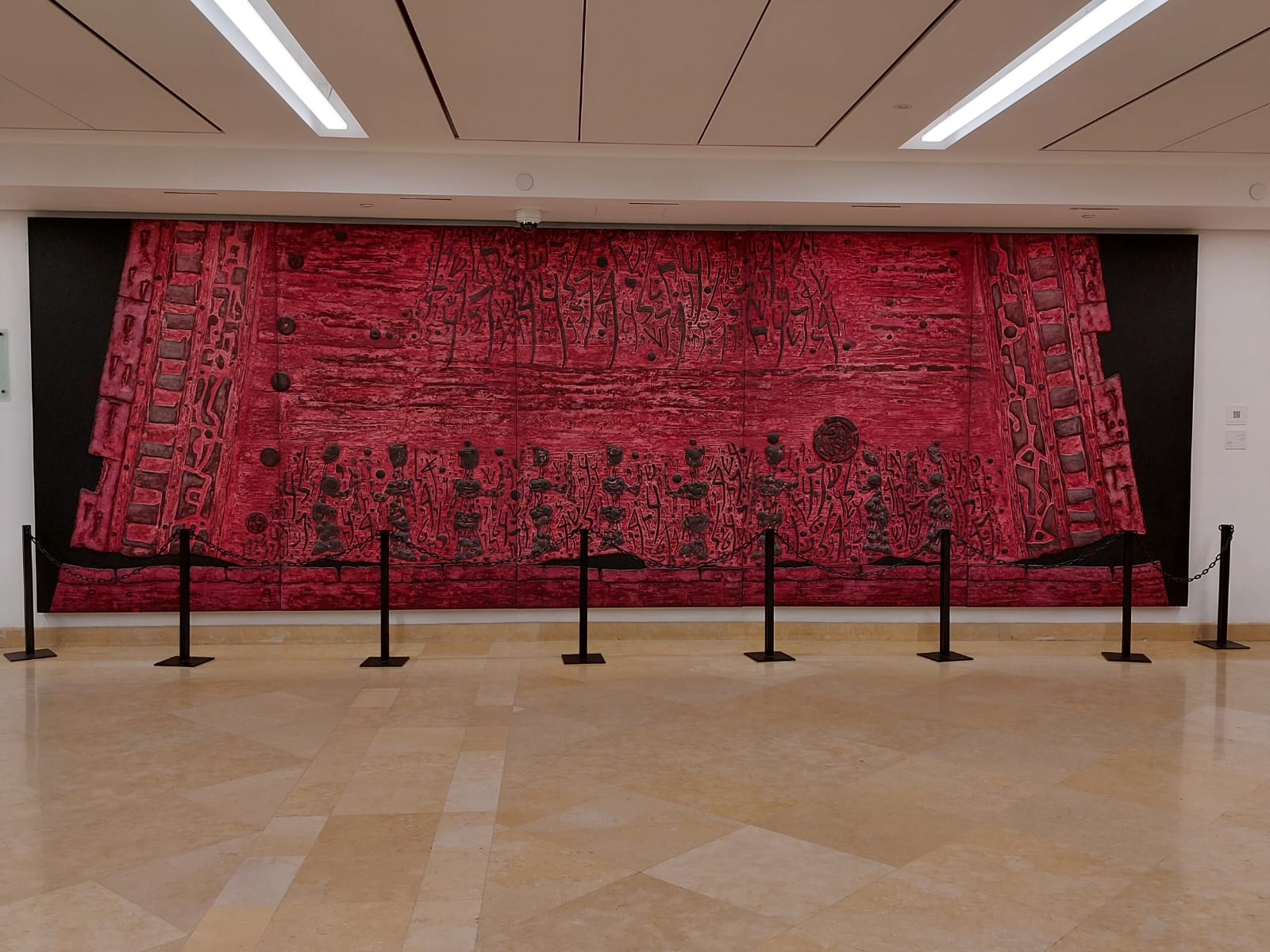
Moshe Castel's Jerusalem song of Fame. The relief is made out of crushed basalt.

During the 1950s, 1960s and 1970s, the work of the Ofakim Hadashim (New Horizons) influenced new artistic trends in Israel. Some artists, like Yechiel Shemi and Aviva Uri, continued the work of the group after it dissolved, mostly working in a non-objective abstract mode.

New Horizons' last exhibit was in 1963. A number of young artists joined the exhibit, including Raffi Lavie, Moshe Kupferman and Igael Tumarkin. In 1964, a new group of about 30 artists formed, called "Tazpit" ("Outlook"), This group carried the torch of abstract art into the 1960s and 1970s.

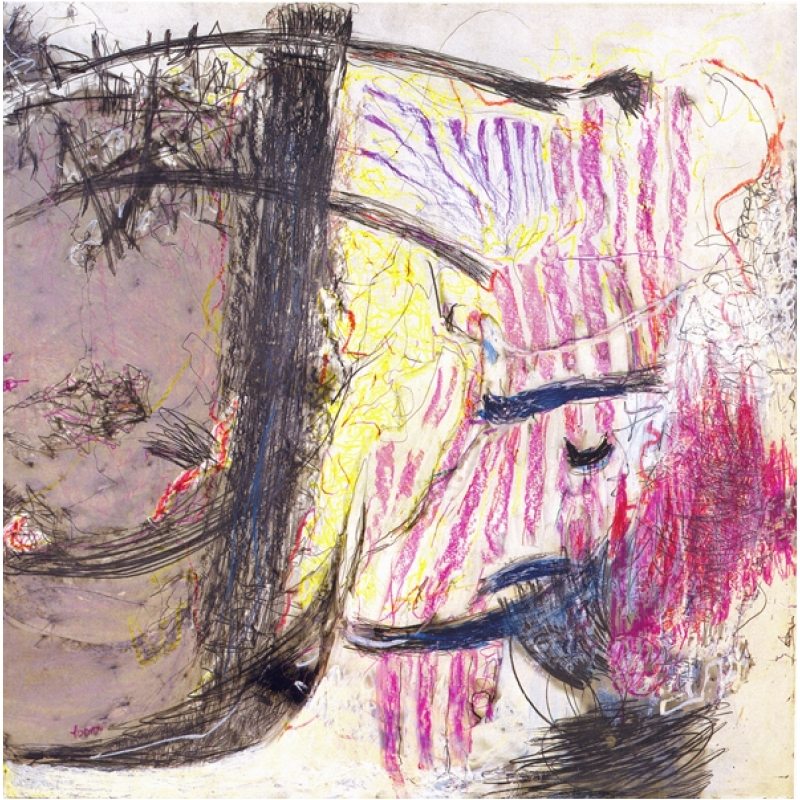
Zvi Meirovich, "Panda", oil pastel on paper, 1971

One of the artists on the fringe of the "New Horizons" group who developed a new style was Arie Aroch. In contrast to the ideal of the rest of the group, Aroch's works showed, in addition to lyric abstraction, a tendency toward substantive content. For example, "Red House (How Are Things at Home?)" (1960), "Sarajevo Manuscript" (1966), and others hinted at content of Jewish historical significance along with the influence of the Pop Art of the time. In his works "The High Commissioner" (1966) and "Agripas Street" (1964), for instance, the many interpretations these works received included widespread perception of them as historical paintings in which Judaism and Jewish tradition are given a place of prominence. These paintings in particular, and Aroch's work in general, are generally viewed as the antithesis of the "Caananite" approach seen, for example, in Itzhak Danziger's early works.

Aviva Uri created expressive abstract drawings with motifs and images that called to mind birds, circus images, and landscapes. Another artist, Lea Nikel, painted highly colored abstracts in the style of French art of that period. Avigdor Arikha also painted in Israel during those years according to the principles outlined by the "New Horizons" group. Arikha painted large works in dark colors until he emigrated to Europe, where he began to produce small figurative paintings. Abstract art merged with conceptual art in Israel in the 1960s and 1970s.

Moshe Kupferman, who had studied painting with Chaim Atar (Aptaker), Zaritsky, Alexander Bogen and others developed an identifiable style characterized by reduced use of color, and by a process of erasing and wiping the drawing over and over until it formed an expressive grid. For many years Kupferman refused to identify his works with any external themes, in spite of critics' attempts to label his paintings a reaction to the Holocaust. (Note: Exceptions to this are the works "With beers, beers, and more beers" (1982), influenced by the Sabra and Shatilla Massacre, drawings in memory of Emil Greenzweig (1983), and the group of late works "Fraction and Time", exhibited at Kibbutz Lohamei HaGeta'ot.) Alternatively, his works have been described as a phenomenological process: as layers constructed in a dialectical process which accrues "life experience as the layers accumulate".

== Local art between wars, 1967–1982 ==
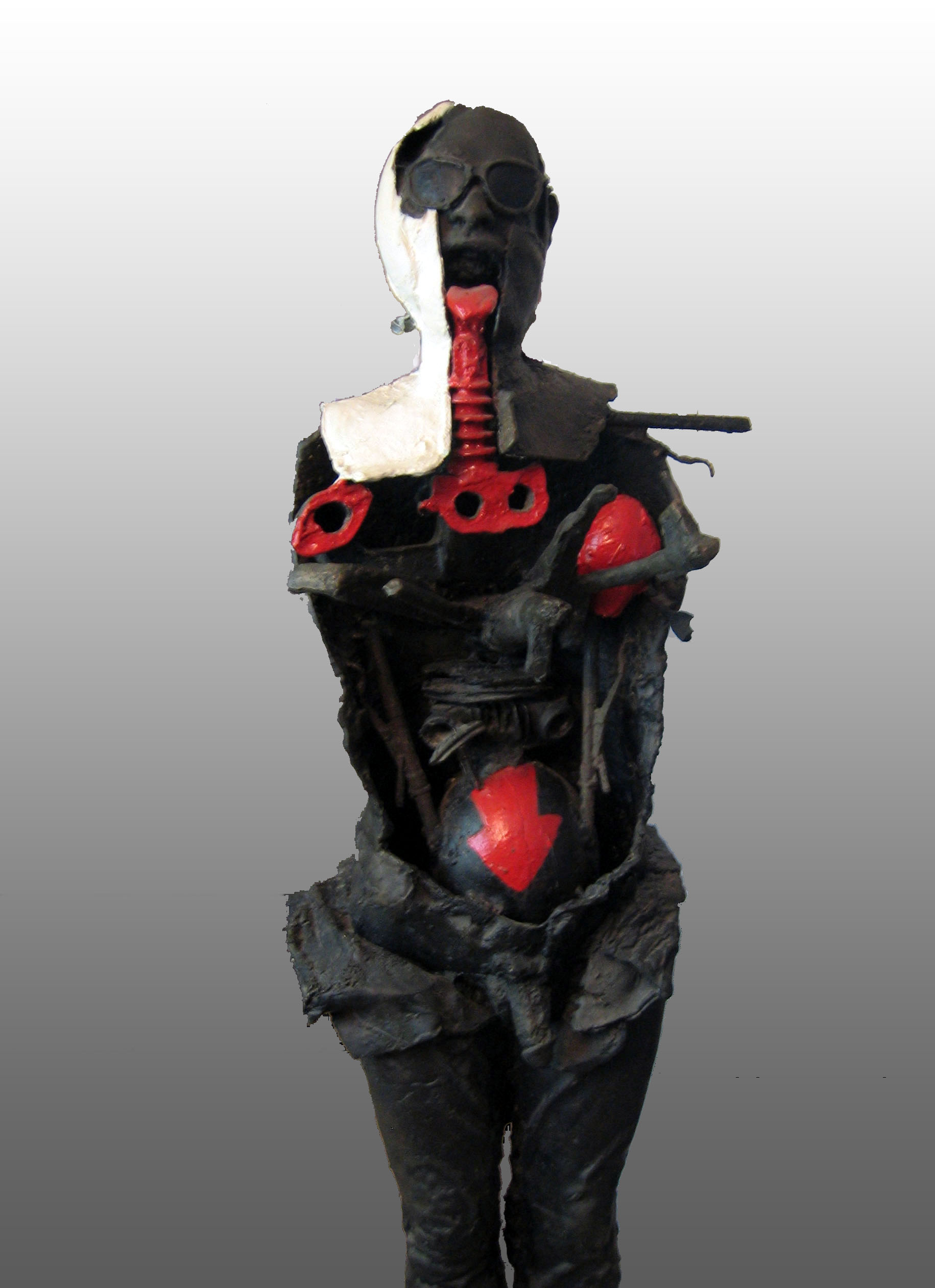
Yigal Tumarkin He Walked through the Fields, 1967

Until the 1970s, mainstream Israeli art dealt with a broad artistic and personal spectrum but, for the most part, ignored political issues. Even artists who portrayed cultural or Jewish content in their works were considered anachronistic by the artistic establishment of the time.

In the 1960s American artistic influences began to reach Israel, especially abstract expressionism, pop art, and later, even the art pauvre of conceptual art. In addition to bringing new artistic forms, these influences also introduced a direct engagement with political and social issues. Events of The Six-Day War and The Yom Kippur War intensified these influences and led to a variety of politically charged artistic expressions which became the trademark of an entire generation of younger artists. Under the influence of American conceptual art, there even developed among Israeli artists a tendency to emphasize the dimension of artistic creativity, that is, the "ars poetica" discourse, and how it is perceived by the viewer of art within society. In this spirit, artistic activity in Israel was often seen to be part of the country's social-political reality.

=== Protest art ===
Among the first artists who began to express these artistic influences in their works was the sculptor and painter Igael Tumarkin, whose art expressed engagement with burning political issues. At the encouragement of Yona Fischer and Sam Dubiner, Tumarkin returned to Israel in 1961 from East Berlin, where he had been the set manager of the Berliner Ensemble theater company, under the direction of Berthold Brecht. His early works, such as "Panic Over Trousers" (1961) were created as expressive assemblages. His sculpture "Take Me Under Your Wings"(1964–65) (the first line in the well-known poem by Hayyim Nahman Bialik), for example, Tumarkin created a sort of steel casing with rifle barrels sticking out of it. The sculpture's mixture of nationalism, lyricism, and even eroticism became Tumarkin's hallmark in the 1960s and 1970s. This technique can be seen also in his famous sculpture "He Walked in the Fields" (1967) (the same name as Moshe Shamir's famous story), which protested against the image of the "mythological Sabra"; Tumarkin strips off his "skin" and exposes his torn innards from which weapons and ammunition protrude and his stomach, which contains a round bomb that looks suspiciously like a uterus. During the 1970s Tumarkin's art evolved to include new materials influenced by "Earth Art", such as dirt, tree branches, and pieces of cloth. In this way Tumarkin sought to sharpen the focus of his political protest against what he saw as the one-sided approach of Israeli society toward the Arab-Israeli conflict.

After the Six-Day War Israeli art started to gravitate away from describing war and its symbolic content. Tumarkin's sculpture still dealt with it, but began to express it in a variety of more abstract ways.

=== "Want of Matter" ===
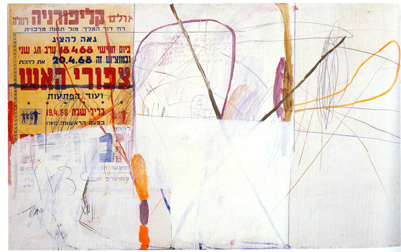
Raffi Lavie Untitled, 1969 Israel Museum, Jerusalem

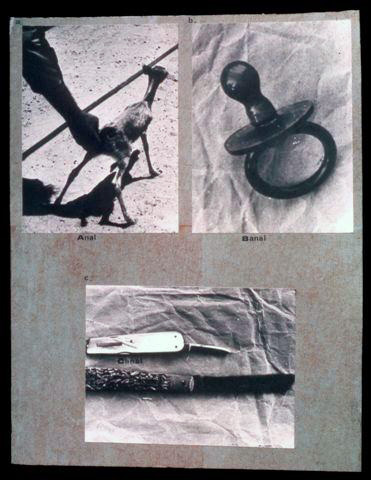
Michal Na'aman Anal, Banal, Canal, 1978 Tel Aviv Museum of Art

In the mid-1960s a group called "10+" appeared on the scene. This group, led by the artist Raffi Lavie, sought an alternative to the "lyric abstraction" of the New Horizons group. The most important innovations of this school were importing pop art and avant garde art into Israel, developing an unpolished style, and combining photography, Readymade, and collage. Among the many artists in the group were Buky Schwartz, Ziona Shimshi, Pinchas Eshet, Tuvia Beeri, Uri Lifschitz, and others. Since it ostensibly lacked a clear ideology, the group focused on organizing a series of exhibits in galleries that tried to emphasize the idea of the blurring of distinctions between different kinds of media in contemporary art. In addition, the group was a pioneering force in the introduction of video art into Israel. Although "10+" officially disbanded in 1970, the members of the group carried on its spirit and its style, taking their final form from a group that revolved around the art school "The College" (ha-Midrashah). The esthetic principle of this group came to be called "The Want of Matter".

The theoretical underpinning of this group was established by the curator Sara Breitberg-Semel, in the exhibit "The Want of Matter: A Quality in Israeli Art", which took place in March 1986 in the Tel Aviv Museum. The roots of this style could be found, according to her, in the wide acceptance of European and American art in Israel, especially Pop Art, Art pauvre, and Conceptual Art. These influences were expressed by the use of industrial materials, such as plywood, industrial paint, collages and assemblages, etc. Another element, which in Breitberg-Semel's opinion was no less central, was the "non-aesthetic" approach, the roots of which could allegedly be found in the Jewish tradition of talmudic studies, which places text, and not form, at the center of culture.

According to Breitberg-Semel, "The Want of Matter" began with the painting of the "New Horizons" group. The members of this group developed a style that came to be called the "lyrical abstract", within the framework of which the painters created an abstracted form of reality with expressionistic overtones. The works of their followers, Aviva Uri and Arie Aroch, used a national aesthetic model called "The Want of Matter", using materials in their art that were compatible with their ascetic outlook and combining abstraction with an implied iconography.

Visually, "Want of Matter" style distilled its characteristics from these diverse influences, preferring painting to three-dimensional sculpture. Overall, this style can be summed up as focusing on the use of low-cost materials identified with the establishment of Israel, such as plywood, cardboard, collages photographs arranged as collages, industrial paints, and writing and scribbling within the work. The use of these materials gave an intentionally humble appearance to the surface of the paintings, a look which was meant to add a dimension of criticism by the artists toward Israeli society.

In an article accompanying "The Want of Matter" exhibition, Breitberg-Semel focuses on Raffi Lavie as a typical representative of this style. Lavie's work "typifies the Tel Aviv spirit", which is European-Zionist modernism mixed with neglect and abandonment. Over the years the image of Raffi Lavie himself, dressed in sloppy short pants and rubber flip-flops, intentionally "native" and "Sabra" in his appearance, was displayed as the expression of this problematic aesthetic approach. (Note: Michal Heiman's photographs documented Lavie in his wanderings around town and presented him in typical situations. The artist Doron Rabina described the national image of the artist: "The end of a summer day. Rafi goes into the cafeteria, sweat is trickling down his temples, and his shirt is so wet it's stuck to his body. I couldn't help thinking, 'There goes a master'".) Lavie's paintings, which include "childish" scribble, collages of magazine pictures, posters advertising Tel Aviv cultural events, stickers with the words "head" or "geranium" printed on them, and most recognizably, sawed-off sheets of plywood painted chalky white, (Note: This format became fixed predominantly from the end of the 1980s.) came to epitomize "The Want of Matter" style.

In addition to crystallizing a clear visual language, Lavie was careful to keep the discussion of his work on a formalist level. In interviews he consistently avoided all interpretation of his work outside the sphere of its "artistic language" in modernist form. In spite of clear iconographic imagery in his work, Lavie insisted that these images were of no historical importance. Furthermore, according to Lavie and Breitberg-Semel, the use of collages and other materials that lacked the "halo" of artistic approval, were meant to undercut and undermine the significance of the visual images. Lavie's students continued the formalist approach in their art, consistently relating to the modernist tradition, but in their works visual images began to appear which made it difficult to maintain Lavie's didactic separation of form and "content".

Yair Garbuz's connection with Lavie dates from the time he was a very young man. For a number of years Lavie was Garbuz's private teacher. [44] Later Garbuz went from being a pupil to being a senior teacher in "The College". Garbuz's work from these years combines characteristics of the Zionist ethos, as reflected in popular culture, with political and social criticism. His two-dimensional works from the 1970s include a mix of newspaper photos, documentary photographs, texts and other objects, combined in compositions that have no clear hierarchy. Some of his works, such as "The Evenings (Arabs) Pass By Quietly" (1979) and "The Arab Village in Israel Very Much Resembles the Life of our Forefathers in Ancient Times" (1981), criticized stereotypes rampant in Israeli society. In his installation " If not a Giant Then at Least in His Garden" (1981), Garbuz created an environment saturated with photographic images, some of which are enlarged and turned into sculptures in space. Between the images are photographs of new immigrant transit camps and development towns, of a father reading the newspaper Davar to his daughter, etc. In the background a recording of a toy whistle can be heard creating the noise of a "toy forest".

Michal Na'aman's works of the 1970s used photography to create collages. In these works Na'aman created images which emphasized the inadequacy of descriptive language and vision, and in this way, showed the possibility for different and imaginative interpretations of visual representations. The practical implications of a debate or of an axiomatic phrase demonstrated for her the failure of descriptive language. Against the background of the visual dimension of "The Want of Matter" Style, texts written in commercial style or in handwriting appeared, reflecting the semiotic collapse of image presentation. Examples of this approach can be found in "The Loyal Fish and the Bird" (1977) or "The Message According to the Bird" (1977), in which Na'aman merges fish and bird images into hybrid monsters. In other works, such as her series "The Blue Retouching" (1975) we see a protest against society's accepted moral and esthetic principles.

In spite of clear feminist connections, in Yehudit Levin's works, we see a more personal and less intellectual approach than in the works of other students of Raffi Lavie. Many of Levin's works are made of plywood and were constructed at the end of the 1970s and the beginning of the 1980s. In these works Levin created compositions of sawed and painted plywood, often accompanied by photographs leaning up against the wall. The names of these works, such as "Bicycle" (1977) or "The Princess in the Palace" (1978), suggest a domestic connection. Even though these works are three-dimensional, their main interest lies in the complex connection between the drawing and the visible area of the work. The work "bursts out " of its frame and spreads out into space.

=== Post-conceptual art in the 1970s ===
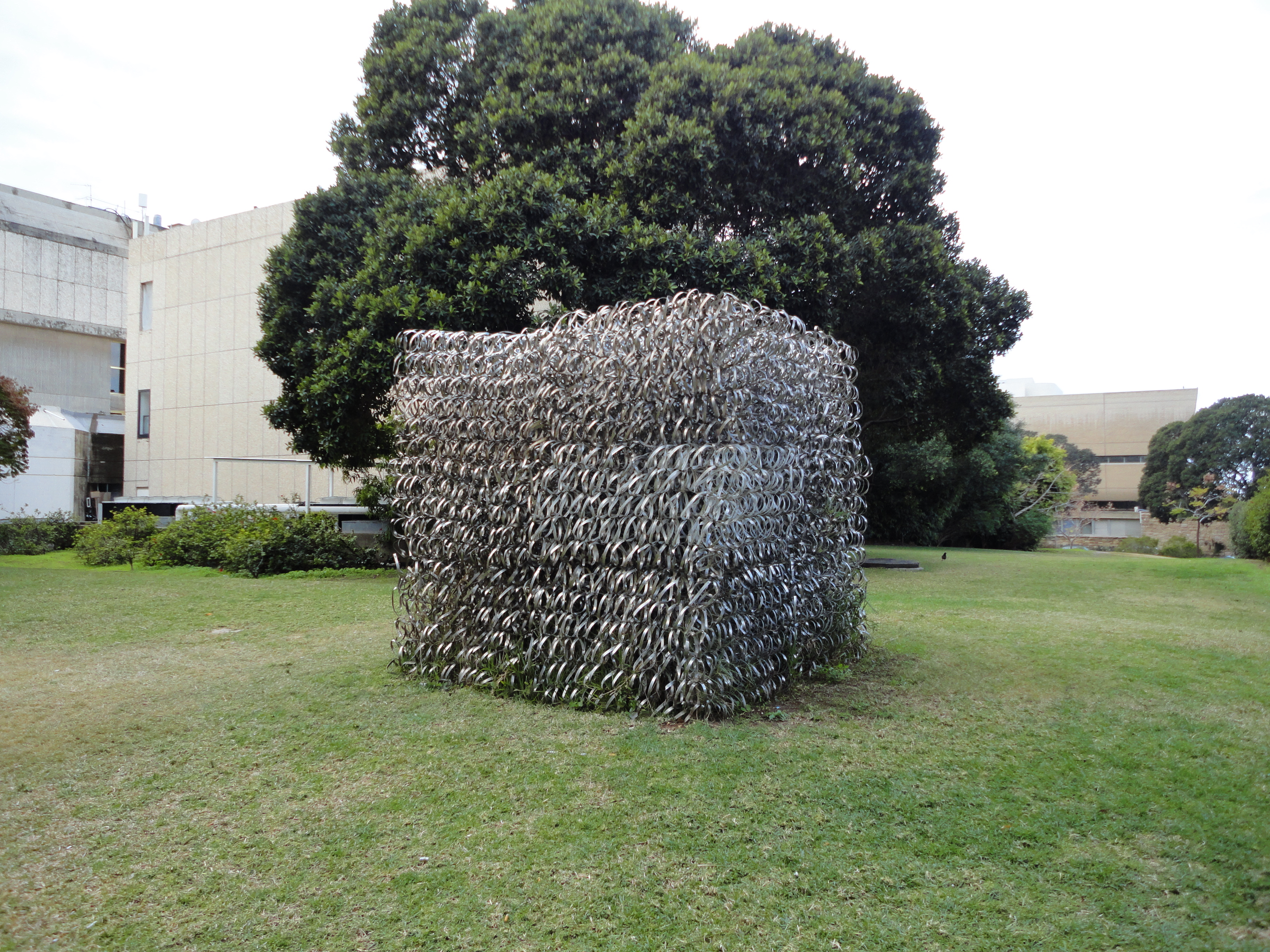
Benni Efrat Energy, 1969 Tel Aviv University, Tel Aviv-Yafo

Conceptual Post-Minimalist Installation artists Avital Geva, Joshua Neustein, Micha Ullman, Buky Schwartz, Benni Efrat, Zvi Goldstein, Yocheved Weinfeld, Adina Bar-On, Nahum Tevet, Or Ner, Michael Gitlin, Pinchas Cohen Gan discarded the conventions of taste, the heroics of authenticity, and provincial narrative. By sheer force and power of evading 'taste' while yet remaining in the context of art, art could be redefined, its field expanded and the artist liberated to achieve unique existence and value. (see Clement Greenberg)

The axioms of that 1970s group were indifference to Zionist aesthetics; a general distaste for regionalism, national myths, and individual heroics. Avital Geva's Exchange of Cultures brought Arab Villagers and Kibbutzniks to exchange books with one another. To define a purpose for art, he moved his activity into the Greenhouse to grow vegetables and fish ponds with resistant students, to make art an educational tool.

Ullman's Berlin Library created a standard for memorial sculpture. His negative space sculptures were often made by digging under ground. Buky Schwartz made perspective correction and earliest video art in the country. Neustein (in collaboration with Marx and Batlle) made the first environmental work. The Jerusalem River Project 1971 was a sound river at the edge of the Judean desert. Boots at Bet Omanim Jerusalem was an agglomeration –five truck loads- of army boots left by various armies in the region, piled into random heaps.

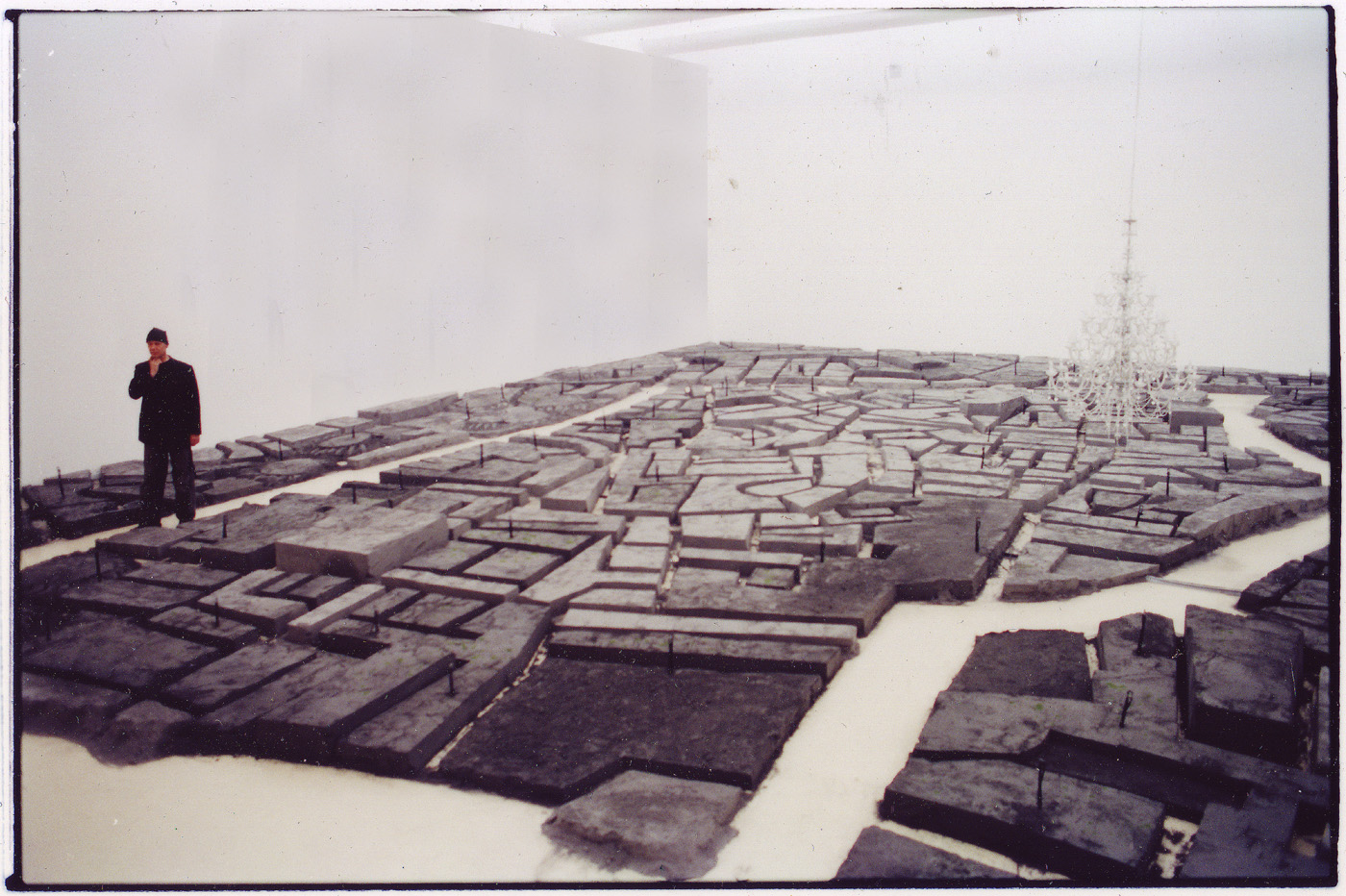
Joshua Neustein, Ash City Bne Brak, Herzeliyah Museum, 2000

Joshua Neustein's five Ash Cities were geographic ambivalences realized in five museums in the US, Germany, Poland and Israel. The Ash cities were on-the-floor relief maps made with tons of ashes and a chandelier.

Efrat's Ararat Express 1986 is a procession of horses passed through the streets. Each horse carried a television set on its saddle. A documentary film projected on the television screens showed throngs of people displaced by disaster, famine or war, wandering.

Efrat, Neustein and Gitlin also produced methodical, basic, severe graphics that re-defined the materials, tools and viewer's roles. Efrat's double silks and shadow pieces dealt with the concrete aspect of pictorial surfaces. Neustein's torn paper works, Erased Drawings, Magnetic Fields, Steel Wool, Carbon Copy Drawings adhered to unity and even uniformity of making objects or images. He transformed drawing into a three-dimensional practice Yigal Zalmona, Josef Maschek, Robert Pincus Witten and other international critics called that type of art "epistemic abstraction". Gitlin hacked plywood boards with the strategy devised by Neustein of removal and replacement. Gitlin's sculptures, however, were more architecturally oriented. Nahum Tevet's work summarized by James Trainor: The basic building blocks that comprise Tevet's formal vocabulary of sculptural units, for both his small wall works and the large, sprawling, encyclopedically heroic sculptural installations, are simple, verging on the Platonically archetypal—the table, the chair, the box, the boat hull, the rectilinear plane, the book-like block, the framework armature, etc. As Sarit Shapira wrote: In any possible context, they identify as mutants of a territory, or as agents of de-territorialization. The quasi-modeled arrangement of these works presents what is not a model of a given production mechanism of objects, or what will always distinguish itself from such a model; at most, this is a model-proposal for a mechanism of objects that does not yet exist. For this purpose, Tevet replicates his items in limited series (the number of items replicated in each work is also limited, as is the number of times that Tevet replicates entire works or major parts of them), thus distancing them from any automatic and motoric—that is, obedient and "blind"—reproductive mechanism.

These dozen artists were not an organized movement, there was no manifesto but rather there were strong opinions and an ideology, a timely kinship that found a common desire for a collective agenda. Sometimes they were referred to as Post Minimal, or Conceptual, to elaborate Israeli visual culture and escape hegemony by a single group. Their hallmark public exposures were in five shows: Concept + Information 1971 (Musag + Informazia), Beyond Drawing 1974, The Kibbutz Ashdod exhibition Mikum Kivun 1978, the 1970s Tel Aviv Museum 2008 "Art and Language", 2006 Tel Aviv Museum "Eyes of the Nation" by Ellen Ginton 2008.

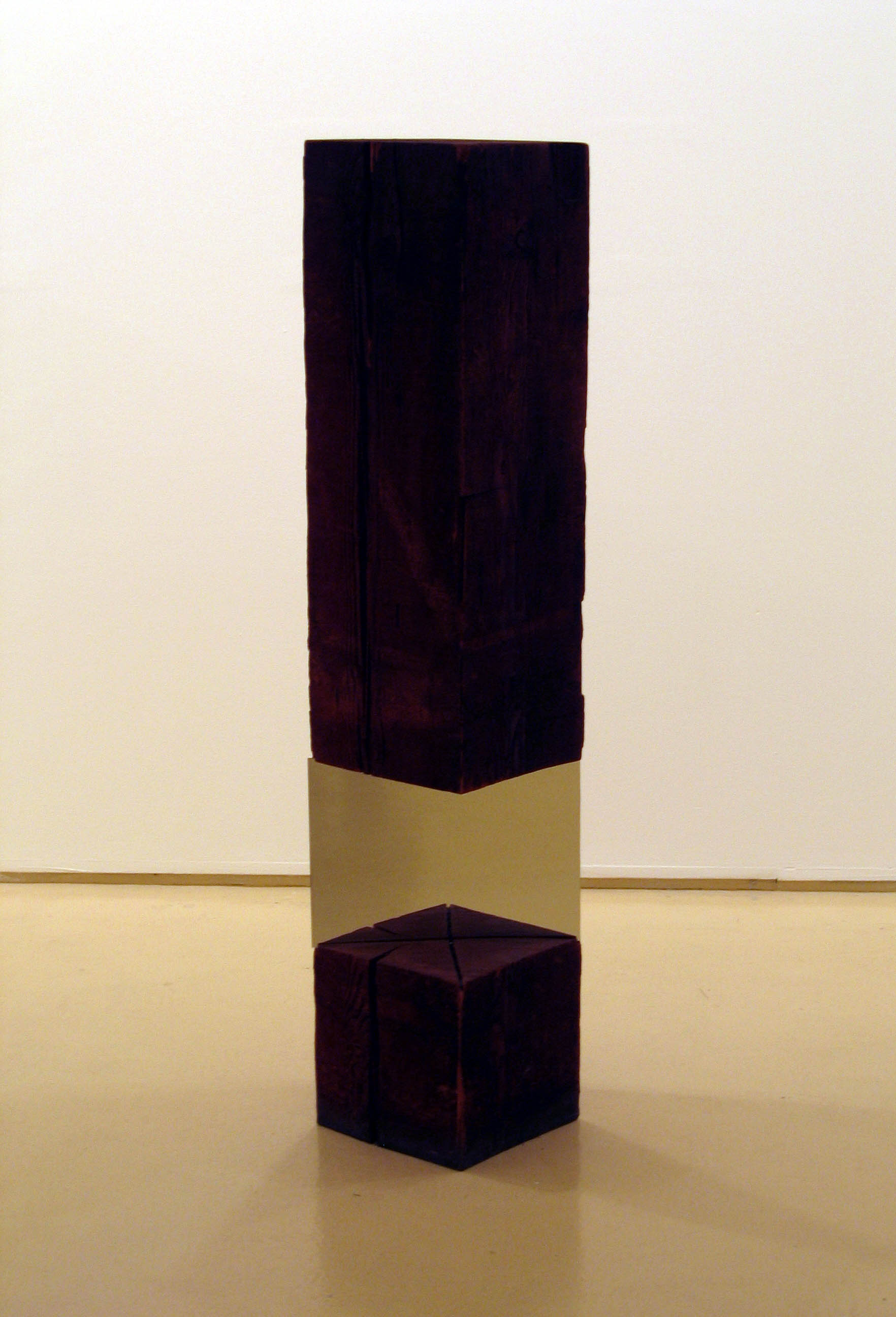
Buky Schwartz Levitation, 1976

The perception of "The Want of Matter" as the "center" of Israeli art that grew up in the wake of Breitberg-Semel's influence, pushed many artists to the side of that center. Gideon Ofrat, who in those years was not only an art critic and independent curator, but also a partner in various artistic initiatives, set up in opposition to the "Tel Aviv School", "The New Jerusalem School", a term whose origin lay in a Christian metaphysical interpretation of the city of Jerusalem. The central difference between the definition of this group and the "Tel Aviv School", according to Ariella Azoulay's interpretation, lay in the difference in the way they defined the status of art in relation to public space. While the Tel Aviv School tended to create its art within traditional definitions, the "Jerusalem" artists sought to establish an eruv (a ritual enclosure) between art and life. A different interpretation, formulated by Itamar Levy, saw in these two approaches two dialectical concepts which opposed "conceptuality" to "picturesqueness", universal abstraction to specific locality.

Another trait of this artistic school is the influence of conceptual art and innovative media such as the installation and the performance or display. It is worth noting that at this time the boundaries between all these types of media were blurred, and the use of terms like "activity" and "concept", instead of terms like "installation" and "display", which were coined only in 1976, referred more to the intentions of the artist than to the final artistic result. Photography as well, which from the 1970s also began to be a means of expression for artists, was seen as a tool for combining images in conceptual art, and as a means for documenting installations and displays. At the same time, and in distinction from American art of the time, only a small amount of the art created in Israel represented conceptual art that was entirely minimilistic or "concrete, " that is, art the entire reason for being of which was to negate the definition of art as representation or imitation. Among the artists whose work in part did represent this approach were Benni Efrat, Buky Schwartz, Michael Gitlin, and others.

Ellen Ginton, in her article "The Eyes of the Nation: Visual Art in a Country Without Boundaries " (1998) presented the art of the 1970s as a response to the political and social problems of Israel during that period. Artistic formalism is perceived not only as a framework for social and political content, but in addition, according to Itamar Levy's formulation, every element in an artistic work is perceived both as a design activity and an ideological concept. Ginton claimed that these political expressions, which increased in intensity after the political and social crisis that followed the Young Kippur War, continued until the 1980s, at which time most artists abandoned these subversive artistic practices and returned to more traditional artistic activity.

=== "Place", "concept" and "action" ===
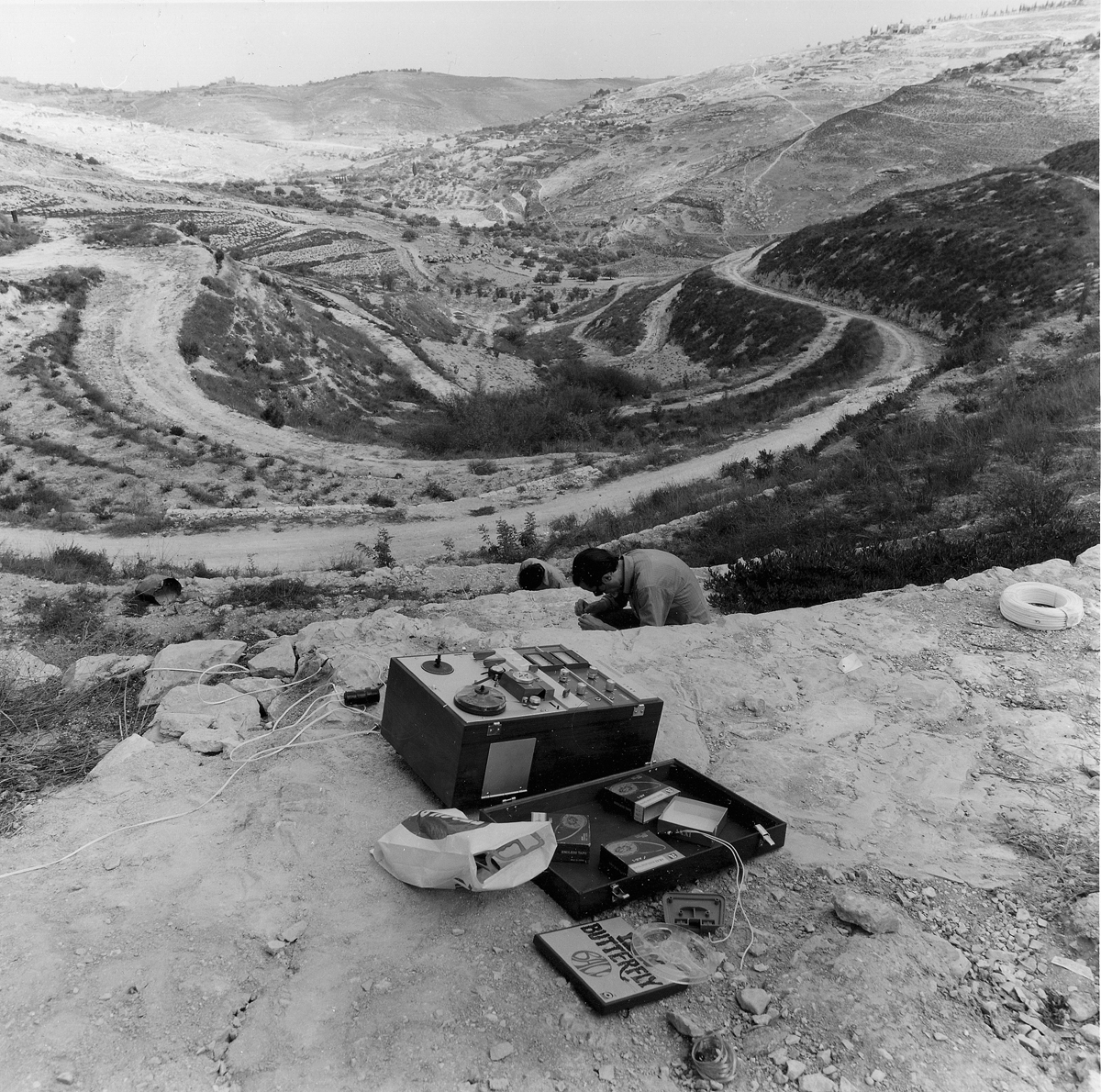
Joshua Neustein, Gerard Marx, Georgette Batlle, "Jerusalem River Project", 1970

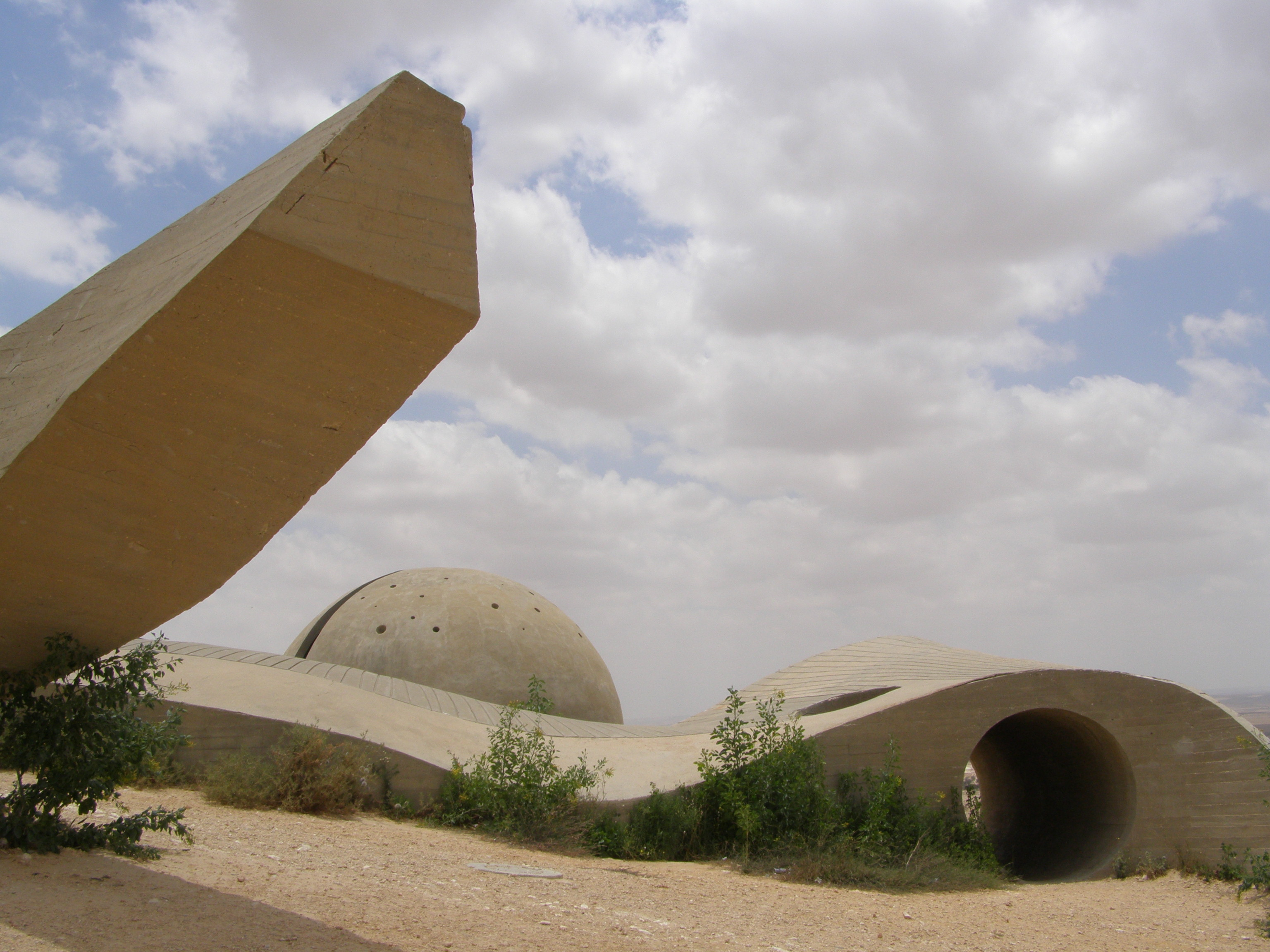
Dani Karavan Monument to the Negev Brigade, 1963–1968 Beersheba

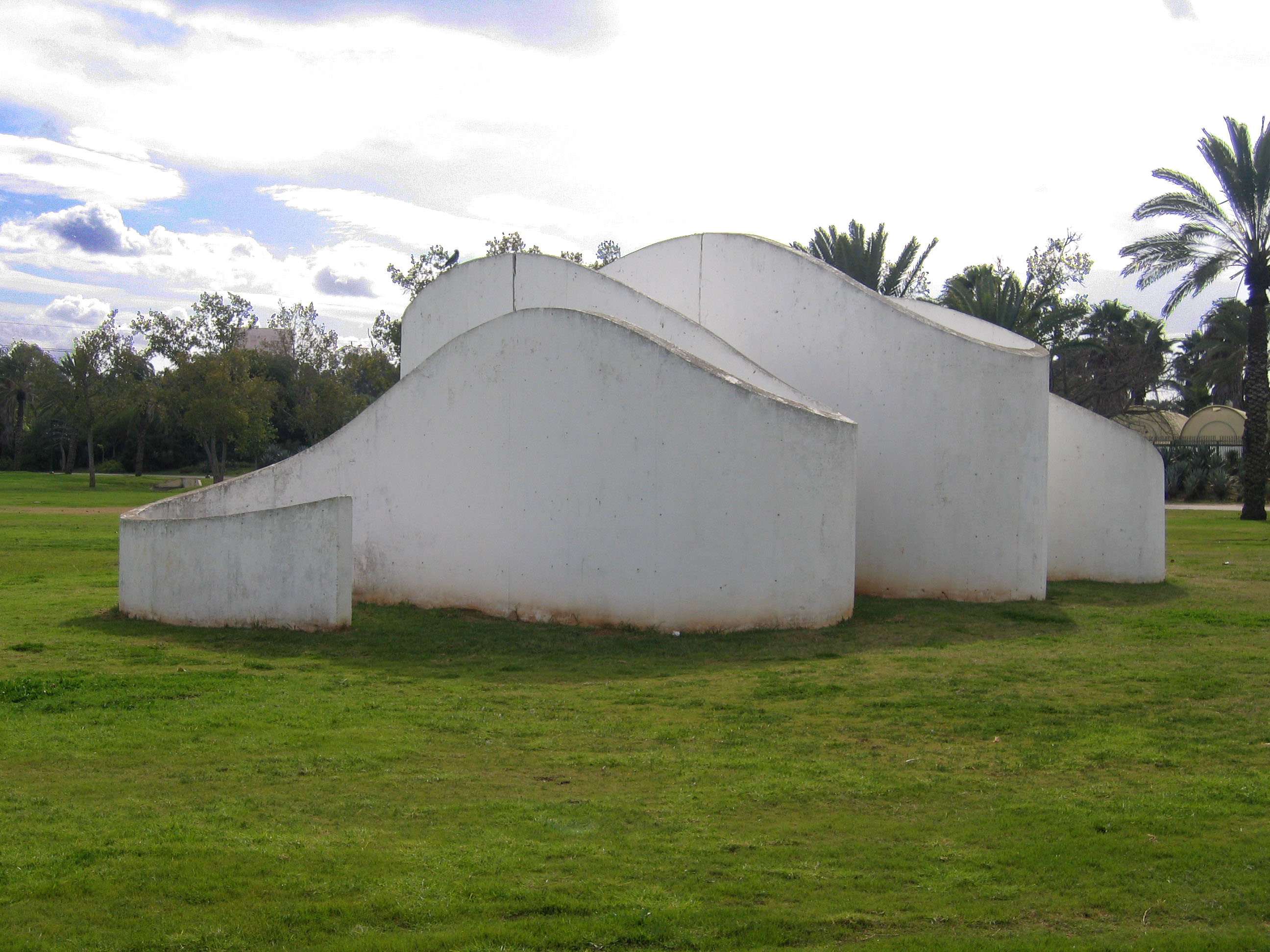
Yitzhak Danziger Serpentine, 1975 The Yarkon Park, Tel Aviv-Yafo

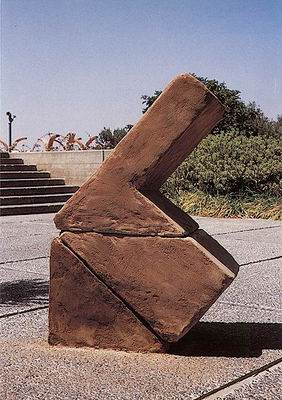
Micha Ullman Passage, 1982 Israel Museum, Jerusalem

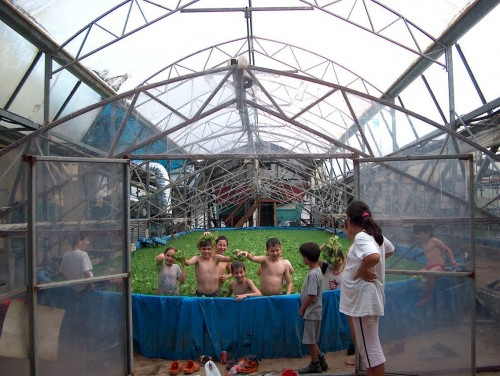
Avital Geva, "Greenhouse", Ein-Shemer Kibbutz, Israel

One of the first projects carried out in Israel under the banner of Conceptual Art was implemented by the sculptor Joshua Neustein. In 1970, Neustein was collaborated with Georgette Batlle and Gerard Marx to create "The Jerusalem River Project". In this installation, in the East Jerusalem dry wadi of the Abu Tor neighborhood between the St. Clare Monastery and the Kidron Valley, taped water sounds were projected out of speakers. The imaginary river not only created an artistic environment outside the boundaries of the museum, but also hinted ironically at the concept of messianic redemption that appeared after the Six-Day War in the spirit of the Book of Ezekiel and the Book of Zechariah.

This work also can be viewed as an indication of the growing number of artists who could be found out in the middle of the Israeli landscape, under the influence of the American trend toward "Land Art". Many of these works expressed a dialectical and ambiguous relationship with the landscapes of the "Land of Israel" and the "Orient", which in turn expressed increasing political criticism. In many works that included metaphysical and ritual aspects, the development and influence of Caananite sculpture and the abstraction of the "New Horizons" school can be clearly seen.

In the art of Yitzhak Danziger, whose work had been dealing with local landscapes for years, the conceptual aspect of the Israeli variation of "Land Art" was expressed. Danziger felt that there was a need for reconciliation and improvement in the damaged relationship between man and his environment. This belief led him to plan projects which combined the rehabilitation of sites with ecology and culture. The "repair" of the landscape as an artistic event was developed by Danziger in his project "The Rehabilitation of the Nesher Quarry", on the northern slopes of the Carmel Mountains. This project was created as a collaboration between Danziger, Zeev Naveh the ecologist, and Joseph Morin the soil researcher, which attempted to create, using various technological and ecological means, a new environment among the fragments of stone left in the quarry. "Nature should not be returned to its natural state", Danziger contended. "A system needs to be found to re-use the nature which has been created as material for an entirely new concept". After the first stage of the project, the attempt at rehabilitation was put on display in 1972 in an exhibit at the Israel Museum.

Another example of this kind of experiment was created in 1977 at a ceremony in which 350 oak saplings were planted in the Golan Heights to create a space immortalizing the fallen soldiers of Egoz Unit. Danziger suggested that the emphasis of this monument be placed on the view itself and on the creation of a site that differed from the functional quality of a memorial. This concept was implemented by using the ideas behind Bedouin and Palestinian ritual sites throughout the Land of Israel, sites in which trees are used alongside the graves of revered leaders as a ritual focus and, in Danziger's words, "bright swatches of cloth in blue and green are hung from the branches [...] Driven by a spiritual need, people come to hang these pieces of fabric on the branches and to make a wish"

In 1972 a group of young artists who were in touch with Danziger and influenced by his ideas created a group of activities that became known as "Metzer-Messer" in the area between Kibbutz Metzer and the Arab village Meiser in the north west section of the Shomron. Micha Ullman, with the help of youth from both the kibbutz and the village, dug a hole in each of the communities and implemented an exchange of symbolic red soil between them. Moshe Gershuni called a meeting of the kibbutz members and handed out the soil of Kibbutz Metzer to them there, and Avital Geva created in the area between the two communities an improvised library of books recycled from Amnir Recycling Industries. Another artist influenced by Danziger's ideas was Igael Tumarkin who, at the end of the 1970s, created a series of works entitled, "Definitions of Olive Trees and Oaks", in which he created temporary sculpture around trees. Like Danziger, Tumarkin also related in these works to the life forms of popular culture, particularly in Arab and Bedouin villages, and created from them a sort of artistic-morphological language, using "impoverished" bricolage methods. Some of the works related not only to coexistence and peace, but also to the larger Israeli political picture. In works such as "Earth Crucifixion" (1981) and "Bedouin Crucifixion" (1982), Tumarkin referred to the ejection of Palestinians and Bedouins from their lands, and created "crucifixion pillars" (Note: For documentation on the varied sculptural activities of Tumarkin, see Yigal Tumarkin, Wood, Stone, and Cloth in the Wind (Masada Publishers, Tel Aviv, 1981). (In Hebrew).) for these lands.

Another group that operated in a similar spirit, while at the same time emphasizing Jewish metaphysics, was the group known as the "Leviathians", presided over by Avraham Ofek, Michail Grobman, and Shmuel Ackerman. The group combined conceptual art and "land art" with Jewish symbolism. Of the three of them Avraham Ofek had the deepest interest in sculpture and its relationship to religious symbolism and images. In one series of his works Ofek used mirrors to project Hebrew letters, words with religious or cabbalistic significance, and other images onto soil or man-made structures. In his work "Letters of Light" (1979), for example, the letters were projected onto people and fabrics and the soil of the Judean Desert. In another work Ofek screened the words "America", "Africa", and "Green card" on the walls of the Tel Hai courtyard during a symposium on sculpture.

=== Identity and the body ===
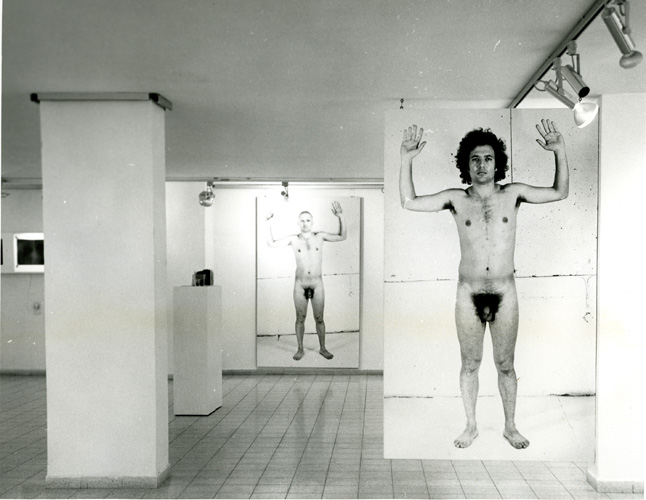
Gideon Gechtman Exposure (Installation view), 1975

The landscape as a space for performance and expressions of gender, which occupied center stage in American art of this period, never caught on in Israel. According to Ilana Tannenbaum, the work of Israeli artists was more restrained and reductionist. In the works of many Israeli artists, such as Moshe Gershuni, Tamar Getter, and others, the relationship to the body was assimilated into sociopolitical significance. In her work "Letter to Beuys" (1974), for example, Getter wrote a fictitious letter to the artist Joseph Beuys. The letter included three different biographies and asked Beuys to make her a coat and shoes.

In his work "Via Dolorosa" (1973), Motti Mizrachi, who walked on crutches, created a series of photographs documenting himself walking along the Via Dolorosa on crutches while carrying a large portrait of himself on his back. The works of Gideon Gechtman during this period dealt with the complex relationship between art and the life of the artist, and with the dialectic between artistic representation and real life. In the exhibition "Exposure" (1975), Gechtman described the ritual of shaving his body hair in preparation for heart surgery he had undergone, and used photographed documentation like doctors' letters and x-rays which showed the artificial heart valve implanted in his body. In other works, such as "Brushes" (1974–1975), he uses hair from his head and the heads of family members and attaches it to different kinds of brushes, which he exhibits in wooden boxes, as a kind of box of ruins (a reliquary). These boxes were created according to strict minimalistic esthetic standards.

=== Political art ===
After the Yom Kippur War there was a palpable intensifying of protest in Israeli art against everything that was perceived as Israeli militarism or its relationship with the Palestinians, the dominant medium for which was the performance.

One of the leading artists in this protest movement was Pinchas Cohen Gan, who created a number of works of a political nature during these years. In his work "Touching the Border" (7 January 1974), four iron missiles, with Israeli demographic information written on them, were sent to Israel's border. The missiles were buried at the spot where the Israelis carrying them were arrested. In "Performance in a Political Camp in Jericho", which took place on 10 February 1974 in the northeast section of the city of Jericho near Khirbat al-Mafjar (Hisham's Palace), Cohen created a link between his personal experience as an immigrant and the experience of the Palestinian immigrant, by building a tent and a structure that looked like the sail of a boat, which was also made of fabric. At the same time Cohen Gan set up a conversation about "Israel 25 Years Hence", in the year 2000, between two refugees, and accompanied by the declaration, "A refugee is a person who cannot return to his homeland".

The artists Gabi Klasmer and Sharon Keren ("Gabi and Sharon") gave a number of performances of a political nature and based on current events in public places in Jerusalem. On 24 April 1973 the two of them drew airplanes, tanks, and soldiers on the streets of Jerusalem, accompanied by the caption, "Who needs a parade?" On the same day the two of them showed up at the Medal of Courage and Medal of Valor ceremony at the Jerusalem Theater swathed in bandages and decked out in military medals.

Efrat Natan created a number of performances dealing with the dissolution of the connection between the viewer and the work of art, at the same time criticizing Israeli militarism after the Six-Day War. Among her important works was "Head Sculpture", in which Natan consulted a sort of wooden sculpture which she wore as a kind of mask on her head. Natan wore the sculpture the day after the army's annual military parade in 1973, and walked with it to various central places in Tel Aviv. The form of the mask, in the shape of the letter "T", bore a resemblance to a cross or an airplane and restricted her field of vision".

A blend of political and artistic criticism with poetics can be seen in a number of paintings and installations that Moshe Gershuni created in the 1970s. For Gershuni, who began to be famous during these years as a conceptual sculptor, art and the definition of esthetics was perceived as parallel and inseparable from politics in Israel. Thus, in his work "A Gentle Hand" (1975–1978), Gershuni juxtaposed a newspaper article describing abuse of a Palestinian with a famous love song by Zalman Shneur (called: "All Her Heart She Gave Him" and the first words of which are "A gentle hand", sung to an Arab melody from the days of the Second Aliyah (1904–1914). Gershuni sang like a muezzin into a loudspeaker placed on the roof of the Tel Aviv Museum. In another work, "Who Is a Zionist and Who Is Not?" (1979) Gershuni wrote these words on the walls of a gallery with pinkish-red pastels. In these works the minimalist and conceptualist ethics served as a tool for criticizing Zionism and Israeli society.

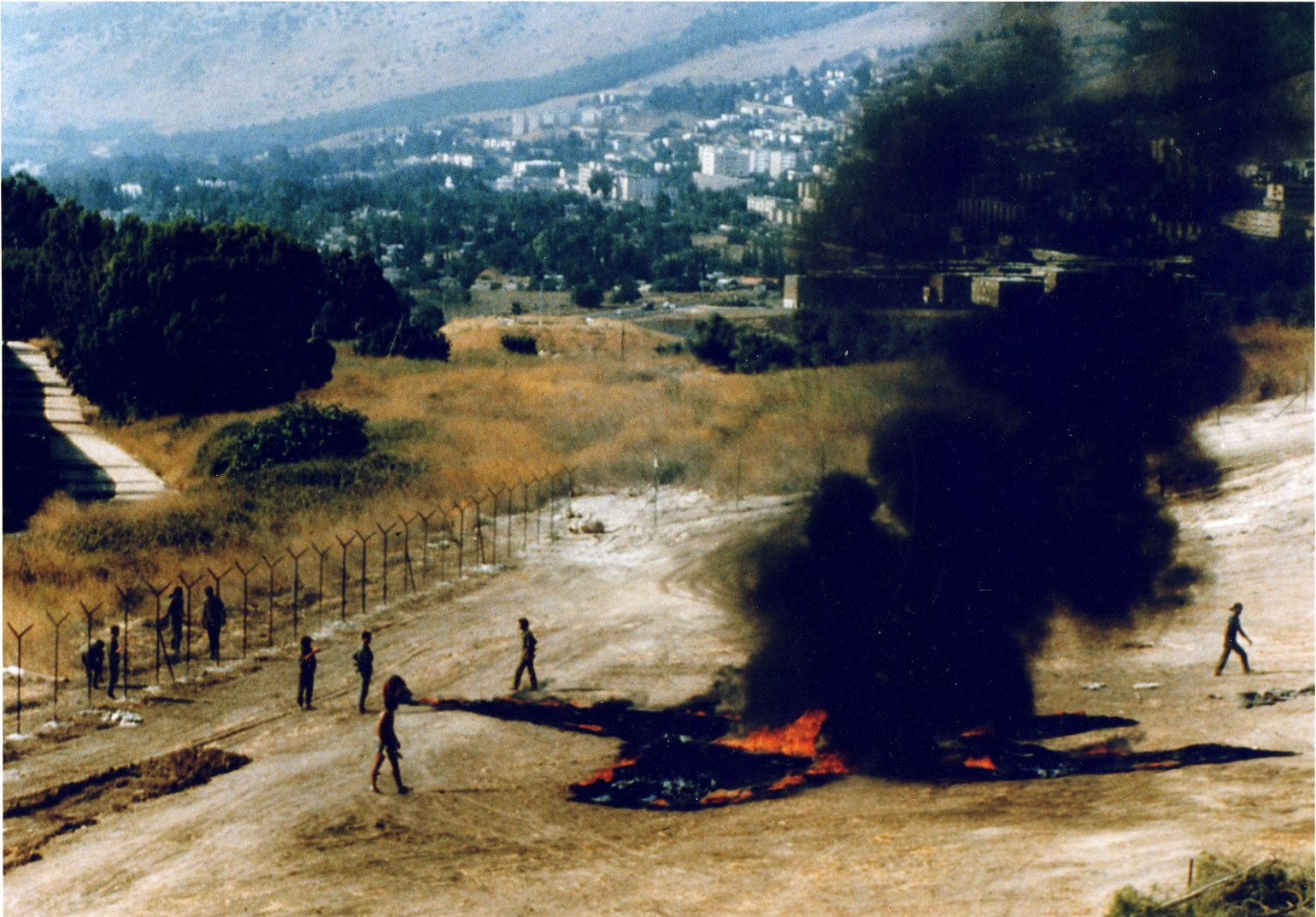
Joshua Neustein, "Still Life On The Border", Tel-Hai, Israel, 1983

Joshua Neustein's Still Life 1983 was a shape of a Phantom Jet made of burning car tires on the Lebanon Border.

== The 1980s ==
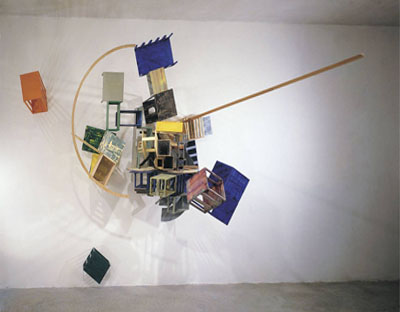
Nahum Tevet Jemmáin, 1986 Kunsthalle, Manheim

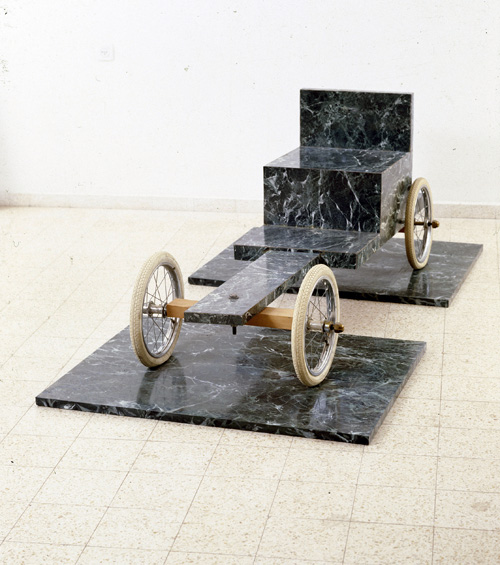
Gideon Gechtman Cart, 1984

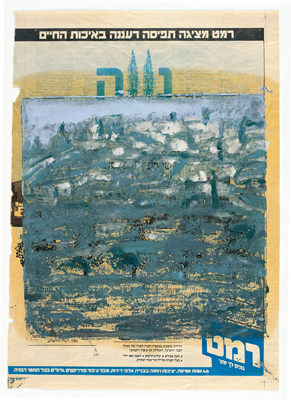
Larry Abramson from tsoba, 1993-4 impression on newspaper no.XIV

Most of the artists who worked in the 1970s as conceptualist artists in a variety of media changed their style in the 1980s and returned for the most part to the medium of painting. This, under the influence of European and American art, was characterized during those years by a mixture of styles all grouped under the accepted esthetic of minimalism, including the American "Neo-Geo" style, the "Pop Art" style of artists such as Jeff Koons, and the fashionable expressive style, also known as "Bad Painting", of artists such as Georg Baselitz and Julian Schnabel, which defined the post modernist spirit in art around the world.

These international trends filtered into Israeli art, which reflected the attempt to undercut the values of contemporary Israeli society. In the art of this decade, especially toward its end, a discourse of identities developed, a discourse that was incompatible with the institutional hegemony; narrative painting returned and regained its status among local artists, intentionally combining the post modernist use of "the high" and "the low" in all aspects of the implementation and themes of works of art.

The expressive style in painting was adopted in Israel by a great many artists. Michal Na'aman, who created collages and other conceptual art in the 1970s, moved to large scale paintings with psychological and psychoanalytic overtones. Moshe Gershuni moved from conceptual and minimalistic sculpture to painting full of Impasto (thickly laid on paint) in which he combined homoerotic symbolism with images of soldiers with Jewish associations, such as verses from the Bible and from other Judeo-Christian sources. Another prominent aspect of art in those years was the use of references to the Holocaust and to Jewish culture in Europe. Gershuni's painting techniques included applying paint with his hands, without using a brush, transforming the act of painting into a sort of solo performance.

In parallel to the expressionist approach, other artists worked in a more formalist approach. The painter Diti Almog exhibited large paintings with textile motifs, such as buttons, shirt fabrics, etc. The works are abstract and decorative in style. The gap between the calculated, formalist (formal) approach and the use of everyday themes was a result of the feminist approach that derived from it. In the works of painters such as Isaac Golombek and Nahum Tevet this preoccupation with deconstructing the personal narrative by dealing in a formalistic way with the relationship between form and content, is also very much in evidence.

If in the 1970s Israeli art is full of social and political messages, art in the 1980s is more concerned with "protest". This attribute is especially evident in the second half of the 1980s, under the influence of events such as the 1982 Lebanon War and the outbreak of First Intifada. The painter David Reeb, for example, painted works of a clear political nature, such as "Green Line With Green Eyes" (1987), which showed the borders of Israel without the land that was conquered in the Six-Day War, beyond the green line, combined with portraits of Arabs with their face covered and the coastline of the Tel Aviv beach. Another painter, Tsibi Geva, created oriental figures, drawn in an expressive-naïve style, combined with captions like "Here is Arara" or "Umm Al-Fahm".

Larry Abramson presented a critical view of Israeli Zionism in his series of abstract paintings entitled "Tsoba". from which fragments of the Arab village that sat on the site of Kibbutz Tzuba until the 1948 Palestine war peek through. This series was created as a counterpoint to the abstract paintings of the same name by Joseph Zaritsky, in which he "erased", as it were, all remnants of the Arab village.

Artistic photography gained status during this period, emerging from the place it had occupied for many years as a negligible area of art. A large number of artists returned from studying photography in the United States, among them Avi Ganor, Oded Yedaya, Yigal Shem Tov, Simcha Shirman, Deganit Berest, etc. At the Museum of Art Ein Harod in the mid-1980s, a Biennale of Israeli Photography was held, presenting Israeli photography for the first time in a museum setting on a large scale.

In the press as well photography sometimes acquired a new aspect, as staged photography, in the works of photographers such as Micha Kirshner. In his portraits, Kirshner used artistic devices such as makeup, lighting, and composition in an attempt to create the desired effect on the way his subjects would be socially perceived. In his portrait of the model Tami Ben-Ami (1982), Kirshner emphasized the artificiality of the public image of the model, and on the gap between this image and the private person.

Performance art also began to develop. The most important group functioning in this area was named "Shelter 209", after the number of the Tel Aviv bomb shelter in which they performed. Members of this group were Danny Zackheim, Tamar Raban, and Anat Shen. Another group, the "Zik Group", created images of large-scale cockroaches, which burned up in complex ceremonies that included ritual elements.

== 1990s and after ==
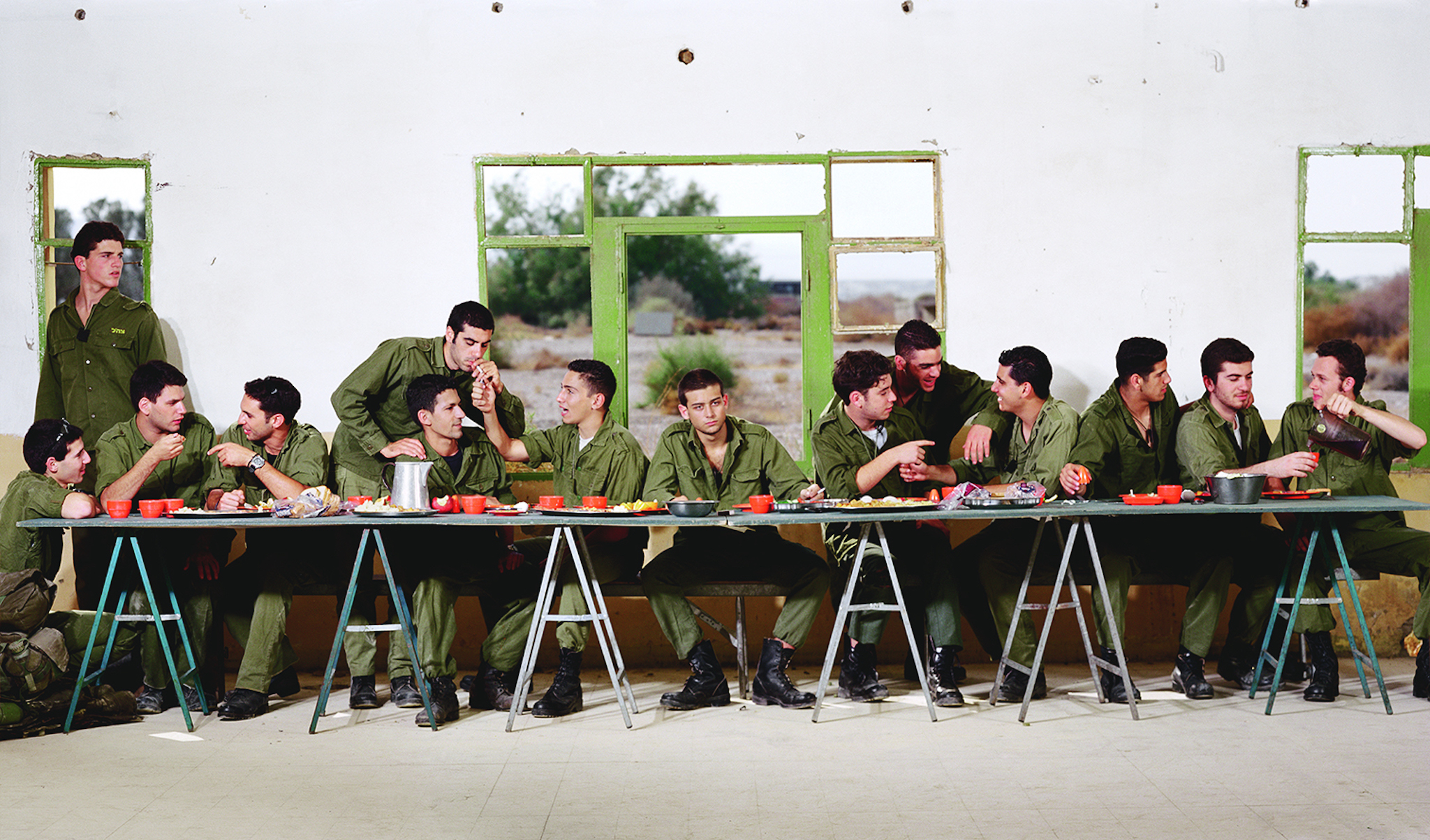
Adi Ness Untitled (The Last Supper), 1999 Israel Museum, Jerusalem

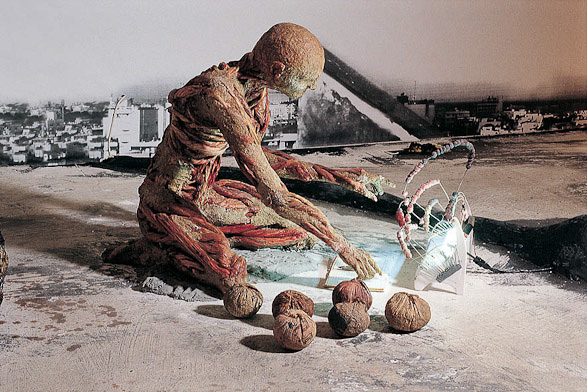
Sigalit Landau The Recorder of Days and Fruit, 2002 (from "The Country")

The 1990s brought an openness to contemporary trends in international art. Among the elements responsible for this were the monthly journal 'Studio', edited by Sara Breitberg-Semel, which exposed the Israeli public to contemporary international art; the opening of new galleries that displayed Israeli art of the times; the increase in exhibitions featuring collaboration between Israeli artists and foreign artists; and the strengthening of peripheral museums (such as the Herzliya Museum of Contemporary Art, which changed its policies during these years). This trend was echoed in the official art establishment with the founding of the "Art Focus" project (1994), which aspired to be a biennale of international art, and in other projects during the 2000s (decade).

As part of the international influence, there was a significant growth in the artistic and commercial importance of various types of media, such as photography, installations, and video performance art. New technologies like online video editing and image file processing in graphic programs, made the use of these media easier for Israeli artists. Another trend of the 1990s was a return to realistic figurative painting, that is, painting created by looking at the object being painted. The painter Israel Hershberg was the leader of this trend and even opened a painting school to train young artists in this kind of painting.

In the works of local sculptors of the 1990s can be seen a tendency towards large and detailed installations. Often they demonstrated a kind of protest against social values by using artistic symbols. Michal Rovner used the medium of video art to create rich and complex textures which were composed of images of people and which produced a primitive-primeval effect. Guy Ben-Ner created videos whose narratives dismantle the institution of family by using comic, ars poetica effects.

In works such as "Temple Mount" (1995) or "Country" (2002), Sigalit Landau created environments rich in objects with an expressive appearance that reflected her interest in transitional situations and in social-political criticism. Social criticism can be seen also in the works of Ohad Meromi, who exhibited works that combined "primitive" images with modernist values. In his work "The Clinic" (1999), Meromi presented traditional local architectures and confronted them with primitive or foreign images. In his work "The Boy From South Tel Aviv" (2001), for example, Meromi created a huge statue of a black figure standing in front of what looks like a road block.

Even the older generation of sculptors turned to historical narrative of a more personal nature and to reflection on the nature of art. Philip Rantzer, for example, created sculptures and installations that recreated his childhood experience of being a new immigrant and a stranger in Israel. Penny Yassour created works that invoked the memory of the Holocaust, along with other personal experiences. Nahum Tevet created sculptural constructions that strove to reflect viewer perceptions, memory, the object, and the work of art. Gideon Gechtman emphasized this connection through a variety of means. In his exhibition "Yotam" (1999), Gechtman displayed a series of works connected to the death of his son, within a framework of works relating to post modernist means of replication and reproduction.

In the field of painting as well we see an attempt to criticize society using the language of art. Nurit David and Meira Shemesh, for example, created figurative paintings reflecting the failed attempt at family perfection and artistic perfection. The artist Tal Matzliach created decorative paintings the significance of which was to show the lack of sexual adequacy. Tsibi Geva continued his work from the 1980s with imagery such as "Keffiyah" and "Biladi", which juxtapose American abstract art with local images.

The tendency toward the preoccupation with central symbols can be seen primarily among the artists who thought of themselves as representatives of a minority group within Israeli society. The artist Assam Abu Shakra, for example, made use of the symbol the "Sabra" which Israelis thought of as a Zionist symbol, as part of a process for establishing an Israeli Arab identity. Another artist, Sharif Waked, created in his series "Jericho First" (2002) a metamorphosis of the image of the hunter in the floor mosaic in Khirbat al Mafjar, north of Jericho, as a means of political criticism. The photographer Adi Nes used photographs of Israeli soldiers, posed in various existential situations, combining them with images of homoerotic significance and of death.

== Contemporary Israeli art ==
Since the birth of Israeli art, there was a long discussion about the role of Jewish content and where it fits within the discourse of Israeli art. The foundation of The Jerusalem Biennale in 2013 was a reaction and partial solution to this discussion. The Jerusalem Biennale aims at creating a platform for contemporary artists and curators who seek to deal with Jewish content and traditions through their works. Modern Israeli artists such as Sigalit Landau, Motti Mizrachi, and Maya Zack have contributed their work to the Biennale and the exhibitions have displayed works from artists outside of Israel as well.

== See also ==
- Artists quarter of Safed
- Israeli sculpture
- List of public art in Israel
- List of Israeli artists
- List of Israeli sculptors
- Architecture of Israel
- Art in Tel Aviv
