= List of Israeli women artists =

This is a list of women artists who were born in Israel or whose artworks are closely associated with that country.

== A ==
- Lili Almog (born 1961), Israeli-American photographer, images of nuns
- Ella Amitay Sadovsky (born 1964), multidisciplinary artist
- Einat Arif-Galanti (born 1975), visual artist, known for photographic and video works
- Maya Attoun (born 1974), contemporary artist

== B ==
- Yael Bartana (born 1970), videography
- Tatiana Belokonenko (active since the 2000s), Ukrainian-Israeli painter
- Tamy Ben-Tor (born 1975), visual artist
- Genia Berger (1907–2000), painter, scenographer, ceramist
- Esther Berlin-Joel (1895–1972), painter, graphic designer

== C ==
- Rhea Carmi (born 1942), Israeli-American mixed-media artist
- Mirit Cohen (1945–1990), Russian-born Israeli artist
- Michal Cole (born 1974), textile artist
- Keren Cytter (born 1977), visual artist, writer

== G ==
- Tamar Getter (born 1953), painter, educator
- Batia Grossbard (1910–1995), Polish-born Israeli painter
- Liselotte Grschebina (1908–1994), German-born Israeli photographer

== H ==
- Shlomit Haber-Schaim (born 1926), sculptor
- Hedva Harechavi (born 1941), poet, artist
- Michal Heiman (born 1954), artist, photographer, educator
- Michal Helfman (born 1973), multidisciplinary artist

== K ==
- Liliane Klapisch (born 1933), painter
- Naomie Kremer (born 1953), painter and video artist
- Heddy Kun (born 1936), painter

== L ==
- Sigalit Landau (born 1969), sculptor, installation artist
- Naomi Leshem (born 1963), Israeli artist-photographer
- Maya Cohen Levy (born 1955), painter, sculptor
- Pamela Levy (1949–2004), American-born Israeli textile artist, painter
- Batia Lishansky (1900–1922), Ukrainian-born sculptor
- Hila Lulu Lin (born 1964), painter

== N ==
- Michal Na'aman (born 1951), painter
- Shuli Nachshon (born 1951), Moroccan-born Israeli video and installation artist
- Lea Nikel (1918–2005), abstract artist

== M ==
- Judith Margolis (born 1944), visual artist
- Lilah Markman (born 1971), contemporary artist, sculptor

== O ==
- Aliza Olmert (born 1946), artist, photographer, writer
- Chana Orloff (1888–1968), sculptor
- Batya Ouziel (1934–2018), handicrafter

== P ==
- Felice Pazner Malkin (born 1929), painter, poster designer
- Nira Pereg (born 1969), contemporary artist
- Tanya Preminger (active since the 1990s), sculptor

== R ==
- Ilana Raviv (born 1945), multidisciplinary artist
- Michal Rovner (born 1957), video artist
- Zahara Rubin (born 1932), sculptor, painter

== S ==
- Yehudit Sasportas (born 1969), installation artist
- Zahara Schatz (1916–1999), artistic designer
- Ruth Schloss (1922–2013), painter
- Deganit Stern Schocken (born 1947), jewellery designer
- Hagit Shahal (born 1950), painter
- Michal Shalev, book illustrator
- Ahuva Sherman (1926–2023), painter, textile artist
- Siona Shimshi (born 1939), sculptor, ceramist, textile designer
- Merav Shinn Ben-Alon (born 1965), multidisciplinary artist
- Malka Spigel, musician and visual artist
- Noemi Smilansky (1916–2016), Austro-Hungarian Empire-born Israeli painter

== T ==
- Roni Taharlev (born 1964), painter
- Anna Ticho (1894–1980), artist specializing in drawing

== U ==
- Aviva Uri (1922–1989), painter

== W ==
- Yocheved Weinfeld (born 1947), exhibition designer, educator
- Nurit Wilde, photographer
- Grete Wolf Krakauer (1890–1970), painter

== Y ==
- Hannah Yakin (born 1933), etcher, illustrator, writer
- Daniela Yaniv-Richter (born 1956), ceramist, sculptor
- Nurit Yarden (born 1959), fine art photographer
- Liat Yossifor (born 1974), Israeli-born painter, based in Los Angeles

== Z ==
- Maya Zack (born 1976), contemporary artist

== See also ==
- List of Israeli visual artists
