= Association for Women's Art and Gender Research in Israel =

Non-profit organization

Association for Women's Art and Gender Research in Israel העמותה לחקר אמנות נשים ומגדר בישראל
- Formation: 2015; 11 years ago
- Website: Women's Art and Gender Research

The Association for Women's Art and Gender Research in Israel is a non-profit organization that works to research women and gender in Israeli art, and to provide support for women artists, curators, researchers and cultural organizers.

== History ==
The Association for Women's Art and Gender Research in Israel was founded in 2015 by art historian Ruth Markus, with founding members Tal Dekel, Dalia Danon, Ruthi Hinsky-Amitai, Orna Noy-Lanir, Mor Presiado and Hagit Shahal – who all serve on the association's board. Markus was chairperson until December 2017, and was then replaced by Dekel who is the current chair, as of the end of 2019.

The motivations for the establishment of the association were many researches that proved the exclusion of women artists from Israeli art history, including from exhibiting in museums and being part of the curricula of art studies, while concurrently, gender studies were pushed to the margins of most Israeli arts programs, if they even existed. The association was founded to encourage both gender research and research about women artists in Israel. Its membership includes artists, scholars, curators, art institution managers and the like, regardless of gender, ethnicity, religion, or any other identity category, who are interested in gender-related subject in Israeli art. Creators from other fields of art, such as music, film and television, photography, theater and more are also accepted as members.

== Activities ==
The association's activities focus on two main areas: The first area is research and documentation – developing the discipline of gender research in Israeli art programs, and collecting and disseminating information about women artists and gender research in the arts. The second is providing support for women artists and creating a supportive community for them and for curators, researchers and cultural organizers in Israel. As of 2017, the association recognizes an "Artist of the Month" from among its members, whose work receives significant exposure on the association's website and elsewhere.

The varied activities of the association aim to create a stage for artists, curators and researchers, document the existence and contribution of women artists historically and contemporarily, and provide assistance for research endeavors and special projects.

=== Conferences and seminars ===
The association holds a biannual national conferences in collaboration with the Faculty of Arts at Tel Aviv University on women and gender in the arts in Israel, and with the support of the Ziffer House Archive: Documentation and Research Center of Israeli Visual Arts and the TIAF Israeli Art Research Foundation. Each of the two-day conferences includes lectures by senior researchers and researchers in the fields of gender and women in the arts in Israel. The first conference was held in 2017 and the second conference was held in 2019, with the next conference planned for 2021.

In addition, the association organizes a series of art and gender meetings throughout the year, which are open to the general public. The first series was held at the Kibbutzim College in 2018, and the second series took place at Tel Aviv University in 2019. In 2020, one series is scheduled for northern Israel, and another in the center of the country. The association also conducts collaborations and seminars with cultural institutions, including with the Peace Gallery in Givat Haviva; and the Haifa Museum of Art, where a seminar was held on the female body following the Chana Orloff exhibition. Another seminar was held on the occasion of International Women's Day at the Social Museum "On the Seam" in Jerusalem.

=== Exhibitions ===
The association holds annual art exhibits, such as "Her Story" at the Tel Aviv Artist House, which focused on ten women artists who had been forgotten or omitted in the Israeli art discourse. The exhibit was widely attended and generated public and critical interest, and as a result, one of the artists, Hannah Levy, was offered a solo exhibit of her work at the Herzliya Museum of Contemporary Art. Another 2019 art exhibit was entitled "Painting Views", which examined landscape art that has resurfaced as an area of interest, and compared and contrasted the work of contemporary and veteran women artists. Also in 2019 was the "Creating Reality" exhibit at the Rishon LeZion Artists House, in which an innovative method of curation was introduced, called "curation activism".

=== Collaborations ===
As part of the goal of documentation, the association teamed up with the Tel Aviv Wiki Women initiative, to add articles about women artists to Wikipedia. Another collaboration is with the academic journal, Migdar (Gender), which published a special issue dedicated to art, edited by association chair Tal Dekel. The association has an ongoing collaboration with the digital art journal 44 Degrees. The association provides expert panels at various art or gender-related events, such as on the subject of representation of the sex industry in Israel, which took place at Hagit Shahal's solo exhibit, "I Feel Pretty".

=== Becky Dekel Art Award ===
In 2019 the inaugural Becky Dekel Award for the Outstanding Woman Artist in Israel was awarded to Hanan Abu Hussein. The 15,000 ILS award is the first of its kind in Israel.
