= Leshem =

Leshem (Hebrew: לשם) is one of the Hoshen jewels. It is a Hebrew name, meaning "precious gem".

Leshem may also refer to:

== People ==
=== Surname ===
- Edan Leshem (born 1997), Israeli tennis player
- Giora Leshem (1940–2011), Israeli poet and translator
- Matti Leshem, American film and TV producer
- Naomi Leshem (born 1963), Israeli artist-photographer
- Ron Leshem (born 1976), Israeli writer

=== Known as Leshem ===
- Shlomo Elyashiv - Rabbi and kabbalist, also called Ha-Leshem

== Places ==
- Leshem, previous name of Dan (ancient city)
- Leshem (Israeli settlement), an Israeli settlement
