= Margalit Banai =

Israeli writer (1927–1976)

- מרגלית בנאי
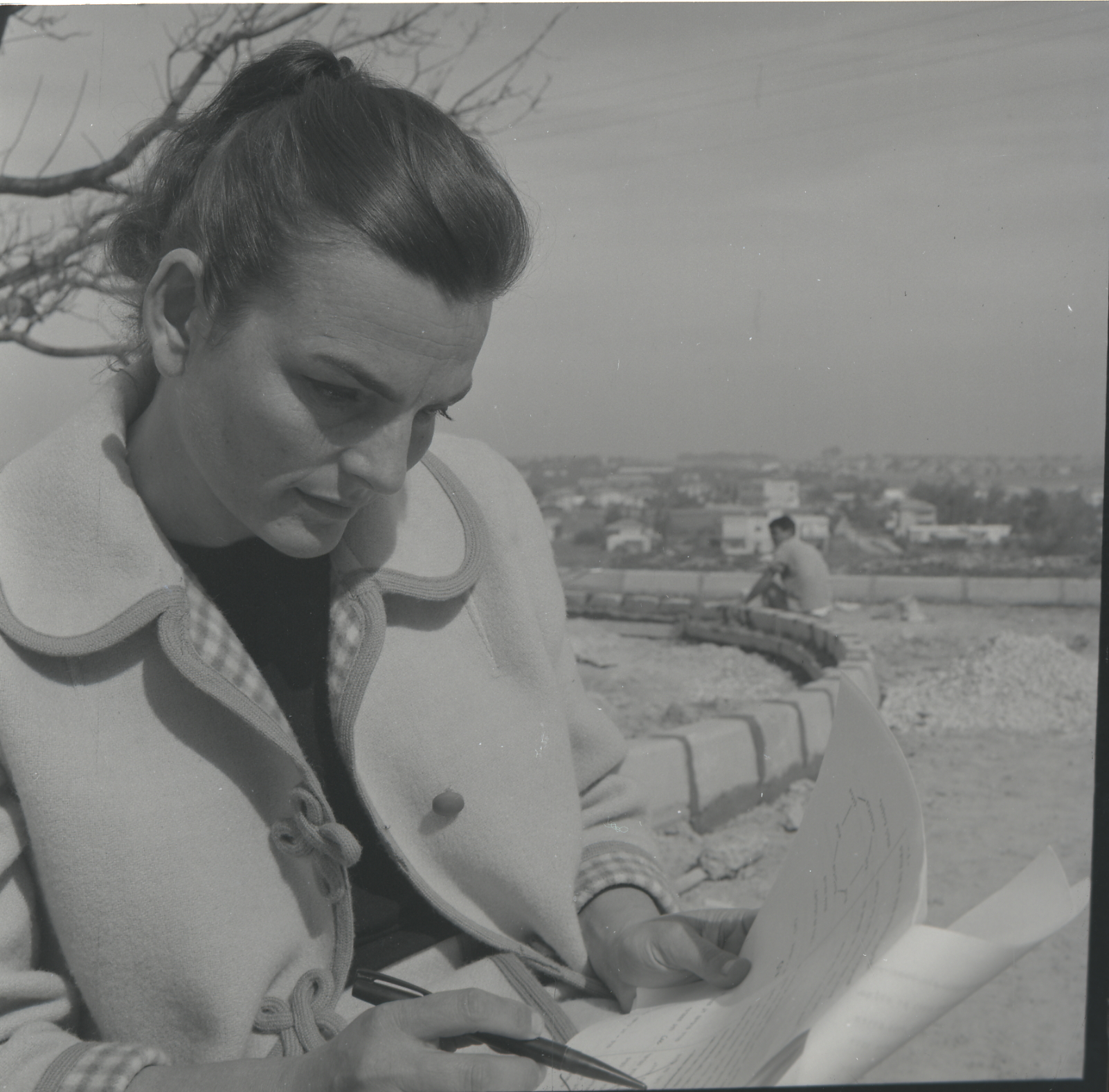
- Banai in 1966
- Born: 27 July 1927
- Died: 11 June 1976 (aged 48)
- Occupations: Journalist; author; actress
- Spouse: Herbert Ruskol
- Children: 1
- Writing career
- Years active: 1948–1976

Margalit Banai (Hebrew: מרגלית בנאי; 27 July 1927 – 11 June 1976) was an Israeli author, journalist, and actress.

== Biography ==
Margalit Banai was born on 27 July, 1927. After completing her secondary education, she volunteered in 1945 for the Palmach and served as a communications operator. She was arrested by the British and held at the Latrun detention camp, where she organized cultural activities for the detainees. During the War of Independence she was a member of the Chizbatron entertainment troupe, and after her release she performed for a time in professional theater, including in the play "He Walked Through the Fields" at the Cameri Theatre.

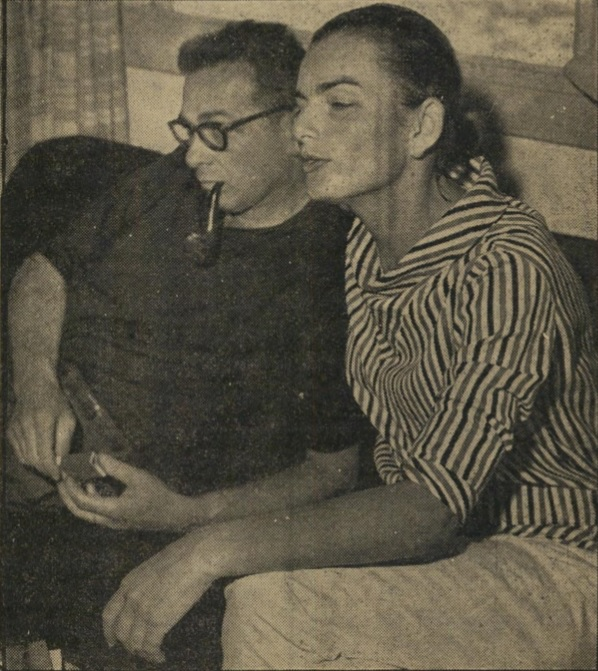
Margalit Banay and Herbert Ruskol

Afterward she devoted herself primarily to writing for children. She contributed to youth weeklies, wrote radio plays, and in the early 1960s produced the "Good Night" record series, which featured stories for children. Together with her husband, Herbert Russcol (1921–1985), a Mahal volunteer, she co-authored books in English. The couple had a son, Micha. They also opened a record store called "Studio 1" on Allenby Street in Tel Aviv.

She lived for a time in the United States and served in the late 1960s as a correspondent for the newspaper LaMerhav there. For a period she was a member of Kibbutz Dafna. In the early 1970s she directed plays as part of the Kibbutz Stage. In her final years she lived in Arad and organized the "Desert Arts" exhibition, which she intended to develop into a permanent exhibition for Negev artists.

Margalit Banai died in 1976 of cancer, at the age of 48. She was buried in the Southern Cemetery.

== Books ==
- Russcol, Herbert and Margalit Banai, Kilometer 95, Houghton Mifflin, Boston, 1958
- Villa Vardi: a novel, 1961
- "In Search of the Treasure" (Illustrated by Rina Daniel), Chechik Publishing, 1958
- "The Sheikh's Son" (Photographed by Shlomo Suriano), Karni Publishing, 1958
- "Pitzponet" (Illustrated by Friedel Stern), Masada Publishing, 1965
- "Patzponet and the Gingers" (Illustrated by Friedl Stern), Karni Publishing, 1968
