= Tal Dekel =

Israeli art historian an gender researcher

- טל דקל
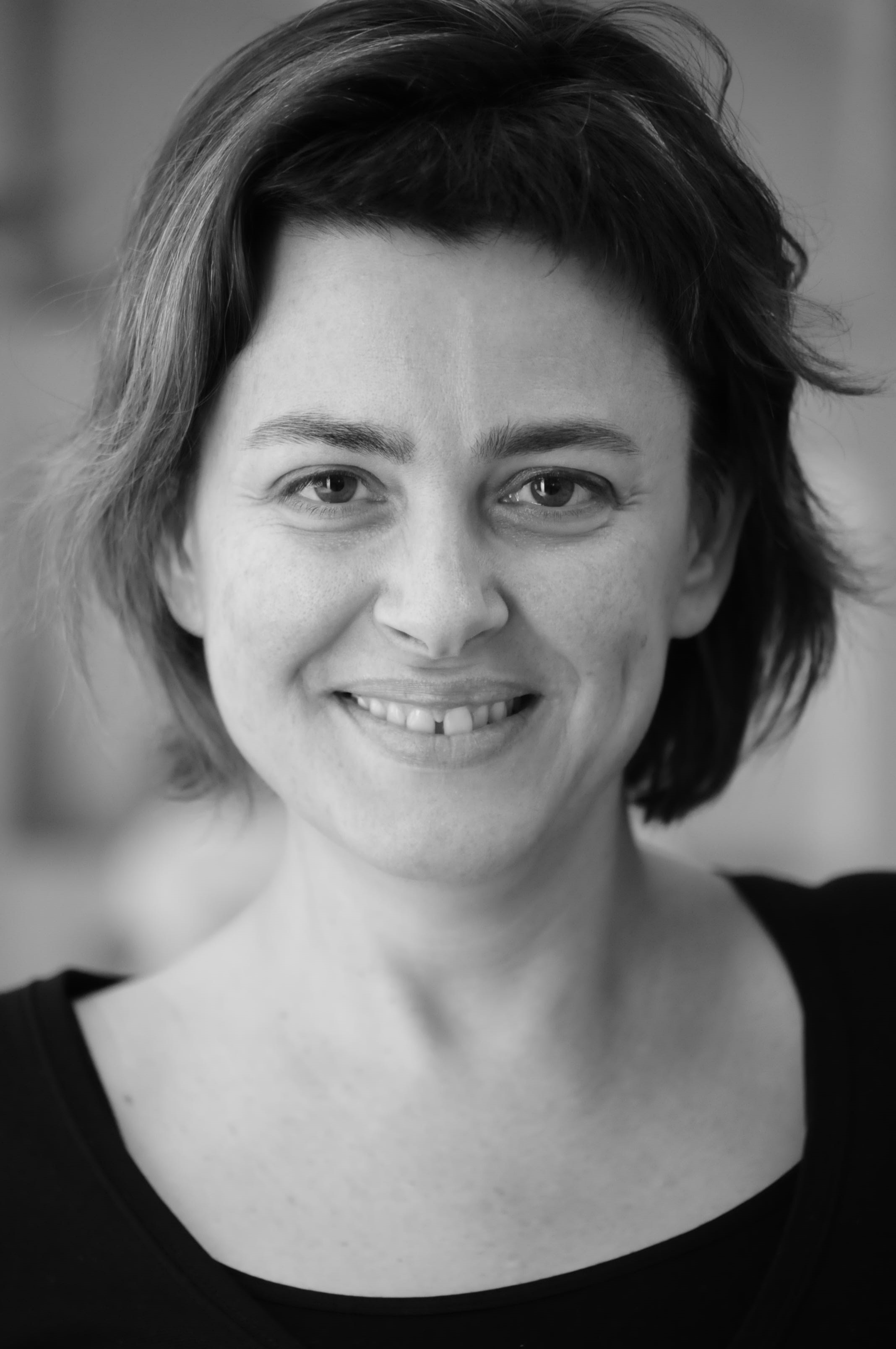
- Born: February 1, 1968 (age 58); United States
- Education: Tel Aviv University - BA, MA, Ph.D
- Occupation: Art Historian
- Notable work: Gendered – Art and Feminist Theory; Transnational Identities – Women, Art and Migration in Contemporary Israel

Tal Dekel (Hebrew: טל דקל; born February 1, 1968) is an art historian, curator and academic, who serves as an associate professor at Kibbutzim College. Her work deals with modern and contemporary art in Israel and around the world. Her research focuses on issues of visual culture, analyzing its interrelations with race, class, gender, sexuality and nationality, while using feminist theories and transnationalism. Her recent research revolves around case studies of women immigrants from the Former Soviet Union, Ethiopia and the Philippines in Israel, as well as studies of ageism in Israeli art and posthuman theories in cultural studies.

== Biography ==
Dekel was born in the United States and she immigrated to Israel at the age of two. Her Grandmother was a fighter in Etzel. Her father, Ariel Oster, is an industrial psychologist and her mother, Eva Oster-Lindh, was a Swedish citizen, who migrated to the US and then to Israel, following her husband. Dekel's mother was one of her first examples of immigrant women, and became one of the prominent subjects of her research.

== Education ==
- 1993-1994 – B.A., Art History, Tel Aviv University
- 1996-1998 – M.A., Art History, Tel Aviv University
- 1999-2003 – Ph.D., Art History, Tel Aviv University
- 2015 – Post-doc, Israel Studies Institute, University of Maryland

== Academic and professional career ==
Between 1996 and 1997 Dekel served as Chief Curator of the O.R.S Collection, one of the largest human resources companies in Israel. Since then, Dekel has curated exhibitions related to her research expertise, such as "Inside and outside the frame: Philippine artists photographing in Israel".

Since 2001, Dekel is a lecturer in the Women and Gender Studies Program at Tel Aviv University. She joined as a lecturer in the Department of Art History in 2010 and was the co-founder of the Israeli Art Track in the department, also serving there as co-chair of the steering committee for Israeli art studies.

Between 2015 and 2017 she served as Chair of the NCJW Gender Studies Forum of Tel Aviv University. In 2017 she was appointed head of the Visual Literacy Studies, an M.Ed. program, and head of the Curatorial Studies at the Kibbutzim College of Technology and Arts.

Dekel is an editorial member of the academic journals "Cosmos- feminist Art Practices and Research" and "Migdar – An Interdisciplinary Journal for Gender and Feminism". In 2015 she was co-founder of the Association for Women's Art and Gender Research in Israel, and served as a board member, until January 2018, when she became chair of the association. She currently serves as head of the Ruth Markus Foundation, Israel.

In 2013 she won the DeRoy Testamentory Foundation Medal for Excellence in Education, given by the NCJW organization to the most influential Israeli women. In 2017 she received the Goldenberg Prize (San Diego) for best manuscript of the year, on behalf of the Open University, Ra'anana, Israel.

Dekel is also a social activist, serving as a board member of "Achoti - Movement for Women in Israel". She is also part of the Israeli initiative of the "1325 – Women for Peace and Security" that aims to implement United Nations Security Council Resolution 1325 in all the departments of Israeli government. Dekel is a member of "T.E.A.M" academic group, a joint project of AWARE, Paris and The Center Pompidue, Paris (Teaching, E-learning, Agency, Mentoring is an international academic network), dedicated to the production and sharing of knowledge about women artists around the world, led by Dr. Maura Reilly.

In June 2024 Dekel was promoted to associate professor at the Kibbutzim College.

== Research ==
Her book, Gendered – Art and Feminist Theory, combines a discussion about feminist art and theoretical issues that are linked by a unique and reciprocal bond whose influence extends far beyond their own bounds into the social, cultural, political and economic realms, as well as into personal lives of women and men alike. This linkage was forged in different places around the world in the 1960s and 1970s. It was especially influential in the United States, during a decade that witnessed the emergence and growth of the Women's Liberation, Civil Rights, LGBT, and hippie movements, as well as the protest against the Vietnam War. In response to these events, large numbers of women artists joined the ranks of contemporary political-feminist activists, their art directly reflecting the concerns of feminist theory and practice. This volume adopts an interdisciplinary approach via which it compares American feminist art and artists with their European counterparts. In order to elucidate the geographical divide, this book takes as a test case the work of Mary Kelly who, while born in the US, produced much of her work while living in Britain and under the influence of European thought. Challenging traditional disciplinary boundaries, it moves beyond an art-history survey to discuss the artistic field in relation to feminist theory and politics, revealing their continuing relevance for the contemporary reader. While concentrating upon the second wave of feminism in Europe and USA, it also addresses aspects of the third wave and the current state of the feminist movement, particularly in respect to the Israeli art scene.

Her book, Transnational Identities: Women, Art, and Migration in Contemporary Israel, offers a critical discussion of women immigrants in Israel through an analysis of works by artists who immigrated to the country beginning in the 1990s. Though numerous aspects of women migrants have received intense academic scrutiny, no scholarly books to date have addressed the gender facets of the experiences of contemporary women immigrants in Israel. The book follows an up-to-date theoretical model, adopting critical tools from a wide range of fields and weaving them together through an in-depth qualitative study that includes the use of open interviews, critical theories, and analysis of artworks, offering a unique and compelling perspective from which to discuss this complex subject of citizenship and cultural belonging in an ethno-national state.

The book therefore contributes to several fields of research, including women's lives, citizenship studies, global migration, Jewish and national identity and women's art in contemporary Israel. The book is divided into sections, each of which aims a spotlight on women artists belonging to a distinct groups of immigrants — the former Soviet Union, Ethiopia, and the Philippines — and shows how their artwork reflects various conflicts regarding citizenship and identity-related processes, dynamics of inclusion-exclusion, and power relations that characterize their experiences.

Transnational Identities promotes a more nuanced, complex understanding of diversity among women from various groups and even within a specific ethnic group, as well as considering the "common differences" between women from diverse life experiences. To lay the groundwork for an analysis of the themes that recur in their artworks, Dekel briefly discusses the notions of global migration and transnationalism and then examines gender and several other identity-related categories, notably religion, race, and class. These categories underline the complex nexus of overlapping and sometimes contradictory affiliations and identities that characterize migrating subjects in an age of globalization. Transnational Identities - Women, Art and Migration in Contemporary Israel integrates theories from various disciplines, including art history, citizenship studies and critical political theory, gender studies, cultural studies, and migration studies using an interdisciplinary approach.

In her academic articles, Dekel researches intersectionality, discussing issues such as feminist anti-war stances; gender fluidity; the emergence of feminist art in Israel and its origins; and ethnic identities in the nation-state under neo-liberalism, chauvinism and transnationalism.

== Publications ==
=== Books ===
- Tal Dekel, Gendered – Art and Feminist Theory, Newcastle: Cambridge Scholars Publishing, 2013
- Tal Dekel, Transnational Identities – Women, Art and Migration in Contemporary Israel, Detroit: Wayne State University Press

=== Selected academic articles ===
- "Breaking the Pattern and Creating New Paths: Feminist Mizrahi Women Artists in Israel", Revista de História da Arte, vol. 12, 2015 (pp. 93–105).
- "In Search of Transnational Jewish Art: Immigrant Women Artists from the Former Soviet Union in Contemporary Israel", Modern Jewish Studies Journal, vol. 15 (no. 1), 2016 (pp. 109–130).
- "Welcome Home? Israeli-Ethiopian women artists and questions of citizenship and cultural belonging", Third Text – Critical Perspectives on Contemporary Art and Culture, vol. 29 (no. 4–5), 2016 (pp. 310–325).
- "Transparent Substance in a Transnational Existence: Materiality, Migration, Memory, and Gender - The Case of Israeli Artist Alina Rom Cohen," Arts Jornal vol. 10 (no. 2). 2021. Retrieved from:

https://www.mdpi.com/2076-0752/10/2/26/htm

- "Black Masculinities and Jewish Identity: Ethiopian-Israeli Men in Contemporary Art," Religions vol. 13 (no. 12). 2022, Retrieved from: https://doi.org/10.3390/rel13121207
- "Going Beyond: Transnational Feminisms and Multispecies Justice in Contemporary Israel," Art Journal (Summer 2026): pp.24-39, 2026. https://doi.org/10.1080/00043249.2026.2676472
- "Countering Ageism in Contemporary Feminist Art in Israel," Ars Judaica vol. 23, pp.58-69, 2026.

== See also ==
- Association for Women's Art and Gender Research in Israel
