= Ruth Schloss =

Israeli painter and illustrator (1922–2013)

Ruth Schloss רות שלוס
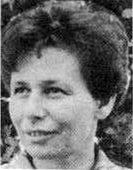
- Born: 1922; Germany
- Died: 2013 (aged 90–91)
- Education: Bezalel Academy
- Known for: Painting
- Movement: Israeli art

Ruth Schloss (Hebrew: רות שלוס; 22 November 1922 – 2013) was an Israeli painter and illustrator. Major themes in her work were Arabs, transition camps, children and women at eye-level. She expressed an egalitarian, socialist view via realism in her painting and drawing.

== Biography ==
Ruth Schloss (Cohen) was born in Nuremberg, Germany, to Ludwig and Dian Schloss, as the second of three daughters of bourgeois assimilationist Jewish family well-integrated into German culture. As the Nazis came into power in 1933, her family immigrated to Mandatory Palestine in 1937, and settled in Kfar Shmaryahu, then an agricultural settlement. Schloss studied at the Department of Schloss graphic design at "Bezalel" from 1938 to 1942 alongside Friedel Stern and Joseph Hirsch. She was a realistic painter who focused on disadvantaged people in the society and social matters as an egalitarian. Her realism was thus an "inevitable realism," motivated by an inner necessity: the need to observe reality as it is.

In 1951 she married Benjamin Cohen, who served as chairman of the national leadership of Hashomer Hatzair Workers Party in Tel Aviv. He was a theoretician and a man of principle, highly esteemed by its leaders who became a professor of history at Tel Aviv University. In 1953, following the Mordechai Oren affair and the publication of Moshe Sneh's followers from Kibbutz Artzi, she and her husband left the kibbutz and moved to the agricultural farm, Kfar Shmaryahu, where she lived until her death.

== Art career ==
Schloss was a minimalist whose focus was human fate. Her natural inclination was to portray the darker aspect of human existence. Her painting was an attempt to stop time and prolong the image's persistence in the retina. In a matter-of-fact manner devoid of mystery, she committed to paper man's tendency to generate chaos, suffering and pain. She painted wretched women, hungry children, old people and refugees.

In 1942, after completing her art studies, Schloss joined a training group at Kibbutz Merhavia. Two years later she moved to the Karkur region and helped to establish Kibbutz Lehavot HaBashan in the Upper Galilee.

In early 1945, Schloss started to draw illustrations for the children's magazine Mishmar Leyeladim, and designed the logo of the newspaper Al HaMishmar. In 1948, upon the founding of Mapam (United Workers' Party), she designed her party's emblem. She worked as an illustrator for Mishmar Leyeladim until 1949.

She used the income from her "Mor the Monkey" project to study in Paris for two years.

Her first solo exhibition, at Mikra-Studio Gallery in 1949, included forty drawings on paper of the kibbutz landscape and lifestyle.

In 1949–1951, she studied at the Académie de la Grande Chaumière in Paris and began working in oils, with which she continued throughout the 1960s.

Her exhibition "Back from Paris" opened at Mikra-Studio Gallery in November 1951.

Schloss depicted ordinary women. The poet Natan Zach wrote about her works in 1955: "Her motto remains that which has been all these years: life as it is, without bluffing." Her "Pietà" (1953) became a universal cry expressing the pain of mothers on either side of the divide. In the late 1950s, she was the mother of two daughters. When she drew her daughters, unlike the universal babies she depicted, naked and with clenched fists, the painting of her children employed babyish sweetness to the full. She also painted children in the transition camp and Jaffa in the 1950s and 1960s.

Schloss painted at a studio in Jaffa from 1962 till 1983. In this time, she turned her interest to people around her – the children, mothers, and poor workers, the alleys and houses. In the late 1960s, she began to paint in acrylic and never went back to oils.

In 1965 Schloss devoted her series "Area 9 (1965)" to the demolition of Arab houses and expropriation of land, carrying a socio-political messages. The series was exhibited at Beit Zvi, Ramat Gan, in 1966. In 1968, Schloss and Gansser-Markus presented "Drawing of War" in Zurich gallery. She expressed the war as an ultimate expression of destruction and ruin, regardless of victors and vanquished.

In late 1970s Schloss began printing photographs directly on the canvas, reworking them in acrylic. She printed her work at Har-El Printers in Jaffa. This technique was mainly adopted in two large series: Anne Frank (1979–1980) and Borders (1982). Through this technique she placed the figure of elder Frank next to that of the famous young Frank, and released it at the exhibition at Beit Ariela Cultural Center, Tel Aviv, in 1981. The series touched upon the Holocaust.

In her series Borders, one of the most powerful images is the figure of Yemenite woman raising her hand. She was the first to raise the Black Panthers demonstration to the level of a social icon. In the 1980s and again in 2000, the Intifada uprisings led Schloss to render representational and symbolic works that could be interpreted as critical of Israel's political and military actions.

Schloss exhibited in private galleries and small museums. The Tel Aviv Museum of Art and the Israel Museum, included her works only in group exhibitions. In 1991, the Herzliya Museum of Contemporary Art organized a retrospective of her work.

In the 2000s, Schloss turned to the animal kingdom: A huge rhinoceros, birds of prey, and other "bad animals," as her daughter Cohen Evron called them. "I connected this to the Nazis," said Schloss.

In 2006, a large retrospective exhibition of her work was presented at the Museum of Art in Ein Harod.

== Education ==
- 1938–41 Bezalel, Jerusalem, with Mordecai Ardon
- 1946 painting course for Kibbutz Artzi artists with Yohanan Simon and Marcel Janco
- 1949–51 Académie de la Grande Chaumière, Paris

== Awards and recognition ==
- 1965 Silver Medal, International exhibition in Leipzig, Germany
- 1977 Artist-in-residence, The Cité Internationale Universitaire de Paris

== Selected solo exhibitions ==
- 2004 "Micha Baram, Ruth Schloss: Painting-Photography," The Art Gallery, Kibbutz Cabri, Israel, Curator: Drora Dekel
- 2003 "Works on Photographic Paper," The Artists' House, Jerusalem, Curator: Irit Levin
- 2001–2003 "Ruth Schloss: Reacting to Reality, Works 1982–2002," Habama Center, Ganei Tikva, Israel (curators: Irit Levin, Miri Krymolowski)
- 2001 "The Last Years," Givatayim Theater, Israel (curators; Irit Levin, Doron Polak)
- 2001 "Works, 1991–2001," Beit Gabriel, Tzemach, Israel
- 1999 "New Born," Nophr Art Gallery, Tel Aviv
- 1998–2004 "Anne Frank in Perspective," Kunstraum am Hallop, Memmingen, Germanyת Traveling exhibition in France (as part of "Semaine contre le Racisme")
- 1997–1999 "In the Footsteps of Caravaggio," Municipal Gallery, Kfar Saba, Israel
- 1997 "Past Time," Nama Gallery and Shai Gallery, Tel Aviv
- 1993 "People and Years," Nelly Aman Gallery, Tel Aviv
- 1992 "Ruth Schloss: Retrospective, 1942–1992," Herzliya Museum of Art
- 1989 "Intifada: New Works," Tiroch Gallery, Tel Aviv
- 1989 "Borders," Produzentengalerie, Zurich
- 1982 "Borders 82," Herzliya Museum, Israel
- 1975 Rosenfeld Gallery, Tel Aviv
- 1974 Mishkan Le'Omanut, Beit Meirov, Holon, Israel
- 1968 "Drawing of War," Forum Gallery, Zurich (with photographer Ursula Gransser-Markus)
- 1966 "Area 9," Beit Zvi, Ramat Gan, Israel
- 1957 The Artists' House, Jerusalem
- 1956 Traklin Gallery, Haifa
- 1953 The Artists' House, Jerusalem
- 1949 Mikra Studio Gallery, Tel Aviv

== Selected group exhibitions ==
- 2006 "Hero – Antihero," Munitipal Gallery, Kfar Saba, Israel, curator: Irit Levin
- 2005 "Nostalie de Paris," Ein Hod Gallery, Israel, curator: Avraham Eliat
- 2005 "Wounds and Bandaging," The Art Gallery, Umm el-Fahem, Israel, curator: Eif Gan
- 2004 " The Art of Aging," The Jewish Institute of Religion Museum, Hebrew Union College, New York, curators: Ayana Friedman, Laura Kruger (cat.)
- 2004 "Drawing. Old & New," Municipal Gallery at Beit Yad Labanim, Raanana, Israel, curator: Oded Feingersh (cat.)
- 2004 "Thirty + Three," Haifa Theater, curator: Smadar Schindler
- 2004 "You Don't Look Hungry to Me," Limbus Gallery, Tel Aviv, curators: Michal Shamir, Orly Wolkowiski
- 2003 "Ten Women and One Old Man," Habama Center, Ganei Tikva, Israel, curator: Miri Krymolowski
- 2003 "Ruins Revisited: The image of the Run in Israel 1803–2003," Time for Art – Israel Art Center. Tel Aviv, curator: Gideon Ofrat (cat.)
- 2003 "Wandering Library: Markers IV," Museo Ebraico di Venezia, Venice, curator: Doron Polak (cat.)
- 2002 "Imagine: Artists for Co-Existence," The Art Gallery, Umm el-Fahem, Israel; Plonit Gallery, Tel Aviv
- 2002 "Artist Against the Occupation," Beit Uri and Rami Nehushtan, Kibbutz Ashdot
- 2002 Yaacov Meuchad, Israel, curator: Doron Polak
- 2001 "Against Violence against Women," Bar-David Museum of Jewish Art and Judaica, Kibbutz Bar'am, Israel, curator: Hanna Barak (cat.)
- 2001 "Current Affairs," The Art Museum, Kibbutz Hanita, Israel, curator: Hanna Barak
- 2001 "Traces: Contemporary Drawing in Israel," The artists' House, Jerusalem, curator: Ilan Wizgan, (cat.)
- 2000 "The Third Color," The artists' House, Jerusalem, curator: Ayana Friedman (cat.)
- 2000 "Women Artists in Palestinian Art," Bar-David Museum of Jewish Art and Judaica, Kibbutz Bar'am, Israel,
- 1998 "Women in Israel Art," Haifa Museum of Art, curator: Ilana Teicher
- 1998 "Scream Quietly Please," The 9th Triennial, New Delhi, India, curator: Nella Cassouto
- 1998 "The East: Orientalism in the Arts in Israeli," The Israel Museum, Jerusalem, Curator: Yigal Zalmona
- 1998 "Social Realism in '50s, Political Art in the '90s," Haifa Museum of Art, Curator: Gila Ballas
- 1998 "Homeland Bound: Form the Dream of a National Home to the Dream Home," The Israel Museum, curator: Tami Schatz
- 1997 "At Eye Level," The Artists' House, Jerusalem, curator: Nella Cassouto
- 1997 "Remembering Shlomo: Shlomo Weizmann, 1954–1995," The Art Gallery, Ben Gurion University of Negev, Beer Sheva, Israel, curator: Haim Finkelstein
- 1992 "Making Peace: In Memory of the Six Day War and the Lebanon War," exhibitions and meetings, on behalf of the Center for Peace, Givat Haviva, Israel
- 1991 "The Color Khaki: The Soldier in Israel Art," Habima Theater, Tel Aviv, curator: Gideon Ofrat
- 1991 "Animals," Erek Gallery, Tel Aviv
- 1989 "To Live with the Dream," Tel Aviv Museum of Art, curator: Batia Donner
- 1989 "Portrait," traveling exhibition, Omanut La'am, Israel, curator: Zvi Tadmor
- 1988 "A People Builds Its Dream: Israeli History as Reflected in Art," Herzliya Museum, Israel, curator: Ramy Cohen
- 1988 "Haifa: Portrait of the City in Painting and Photography," Haifa Museum of Modern Art, curator: Gabriel Tadmor
- 1988 "1948: The War of Independence in Israeli Art," Eretz Israel Museum, Tel Aviv, Curator: Gideon Ofrat
- 1987 "New Bezalel: 1935–1955," The Artists' House, Jerusalem, curator: Gideon Ofrat
- 1986 "The 49th anniversary of Victory over Nazi Germany," Municipal Art Gallery, Arad, Israel
- 1982 "Opinions," The Artist' House, Jerusalem
- 1978 "Artist and Society in Israeli Art 1948–1978," The Tel Aviv Museum, curator: Sara Breitberg
- 1977 "Propaganda and Vision: Israeli and Soviet Art, 1930–1955," The Israel Museum, Jerusalem, curator: Batia Donner
- 1971 "Israeli Art," The Tel Aviv Museum, curator: Haim Gamzu
- 1970 "Exhibition of Drawings from the Museum Collection," Haifa Museum of Modern Art
- 1965 "Exhibition of Drawings, 1965," Haifa Museum of Modern Art
- 1951 "Back from Paris," Mikra-Studio Gallery, Tel Aviv
- 1947 "Artists in the Kibbutz and in the Army," Mikra-Studio Gallery, Tel Aviv

== See also ==
- Visual arts in Israel
