= Tatiana Belokonenko =

Ukrainian artist

Tatiana Belokonenko (Hebrew: טטיאנה בלוקוננקו, Russian: Татьяна Белоконенко) is a figurative art painter born in Odesa, Ukraine.

A graduate of the Pedagogical College and Art Faculty of the Odesa Pedagogical University, Tatiana has been living in Haifa, Israel since 1999.

Her first private exhibitions in Israel were held in Kibbutz Yagur. Tatiana is a member of the Israeli Painters Union, and since 2005 she is a member of the Society of Israeli Professional Painters.

She was awarded the "People Of The Year 2006" by Israel Plus and is the winner of Limmud FSU 2010 Nobel's Festival.

She is known for the large-scale (more than 6000 square meters) wall-paintings of the moon-park in Grand Canyon (mall), and has also created decorations for cinema, theaters, television, and interior designs for cafés and restaurants.

Many of her paintings are held in private collections.
