= Mirit Cohen =

Russian-born Israeli sculptor and painter (1945–1990)

- Born: Manya Malka Cohen; 1945; Russia, Soviet Union
- Died: 3 May 1990 (aged 44–45); New York City, U.S.
- Known for: sculpture, painting
- Movement: Israeli Art

Mirit Cohen (Hebrew: מירית כהן; 1945 – May 3, 1990) was a Russian-born Israeli sculptor and painter. Cohen resided in New York City from 1975.

== Early life and education ==
Manya Malka (later Mirit) Cohen) was born in the Russian SFSR, Soviet Union to a socialist and Zionist family. Her father, Haim Cohen, a Polish Jew, was born in Łódź, and fled during the Second World War to Russia, where he met her mother Rebecca – A Russian woman of Jewish descent. After the war, her family immigrated to Mandatory Palestine. They were deported to a detention camp in Cyprus. As a result, Cohen's first years were spent in a displaced persons camp. In 1948, after the establishment of Israel, the family settled in Givat Shmuel.

In 1956 Cohen was sent to study at Kibbutz Kfar Masaryk. In 1958 she won a youth drawing competition in Japan. Three years later, Cohen moved back with her parents and began attending high school in Bnei Brak. During this period she became active in the Communist youth movement in Petah Tikva. For her last years in high school she attended Hadash High School in Tel Aviv. In 1967, she graduated from Kalisher Art College, Tel Aviv, Israel.

After her military service, Cohen worked as a clerk in the Israel Export Institute in the textile and fashion department. In 1968 she studied at the Avni Institute of Art and Design with Yehezkel Streichman. In 1969 she enrolled at the "Midrasha" drawing and art school in Tel Aviv. In 1971, she graduated from Teachers College of Art, Ramat Hsharon, Israel.

== Art career ==
In 1972 Cohen had her first exhibition at Dugit Gallery in Tel Aviv. In 1974 the Israeli curator Yona Fisher bought some of her works for the Israel Museum in Jerusalem.

In the spring of 1975 Cohen won a scholarship from the America-Israel Cultural Foundation. With the help of this scholarship she studied at the School of Visual Arts in New York in 1975–1977. In 1977, she graduated from School of Visual Arts. After this, she continued to live in the United States.

Her artwork was influenced by the Israeli painter Aviva Uri. Her work has been compared to Paul Klee and described as exhibiting horror vacui. Cohen described her work and the connections she made in it in mystic terms, as kabbalah.

== Personal life ==
In the early 1980s she was briefly married to Michael Dissent. Under the influence of LSD Cohen experienced a psychotic attack and was hospitalized in Bat Yam.

Cohen died in 1990. The cause of death was suicide. She was buried in the Jewish cemetery in the borough of Queens.

== Exhibitions ==
=== Selected solo exhibitions ===
- 2000 Dan Weinberg Gallery, Los Angeles, California, US
- 1999 Nolan / Eckman Gallery, New York City, US
- 1998 Ulmer Museum, Ulm, Germany. (Published a Catalogue)
- 1994 The Israel Museum, Jerusalem, Israel
- 1991 La MaMa Gallery, New York City, US
- 1982 "Woman with Cooper Snakes," Live Performance Sculpture, Soho, New York City, US
- 1980–81 "Cooper Bridges," "From Fire Escape to Fire Escape", Site Sculpture, Union Square and Cooper Square, New York City, US
- 1979 "The Broken Vessels Project", PS 1, New York City, US
- 1978 "Broken Vessels", Julie M. Gallery, Tel-Aviv, Israel
- 1977–78 "Metal, Mental, Melted, Metal", Sculpture Installation, Clock Tower, New York City, USA
- 1972–73 Dugit Gallery, Tel Aviv, Israel

=== Selected group exhibitions ===
- 2011 July–August; "העצב החשוף" Yair Gallery, Tel Aviv, Israel
- 2010 Artists' Choices: "A work in Progress,"& "Drawings," The Israel Museum, Jerusalem, Israel
- 2009 "The collection of Amie & Gabie Brown," Museum Ein Harod, Israel
- 2009 "Lost Little Worlds - Works in Small Format" Gordon Gallery, Tel Aviv, Israel
- 2008 "Near and Seen" The Open Museum, Tephen, Israel
- 2003 "Side Effect" Beit Berl Galleries, Israel
- 2005 "Self Portrait" Alon Segev gallery, Tel Aviv, Israel
- 2004 "The 70's", Tel Aviv Museum, Tel Aviv, Israel
- 2003 "Shemesh," Tel Aviv Museum, Tel Aviv, Israel
- 2001 "Arturo Schwartz Collection of Israeli Artists," The Israel Museum, Jerusalem, Israel
- 2000 "A Wall of My Own, Israeli Art," from the collection of Benno Kalev, Tel Aviv Museum, Tel Aviv, Israel
- 1998 "Women Artists in Israeli Art", 1948–1998, Haifa Museum, Haifa, Israel
- 1998 "Israeli Art of the 70's", Tel-Aviv Museum, Tel-Aviv; Israel
- 1996 "Diary of a Human Hand," Bard College Art Center, New York State. Tel Aviv Museum, Tel Aviv
- 1995 Rita & Arturo Schwarz Collection of Israeli Art, The Israel Museum, Jerusalem, Israel
- 1994 "Anxiety," ("Charada") The Museum of Contemporary Israeli Art, Ramat-Gan, Israel
- 1990 "Small Works", New York University, New York City, US
- 1987 Artist calendar of the Year, Histadrut Publication, Tel-Aviv, Israel
- 1989 "Bullet Under Acme", Great Jones Gallery, New York City, US
- 1984 Israel Museum, Jerusalem, Israel
- 1983 Gordon Gallery, Tel-Aviv, Israel
- 1980 "Lines & Drawings" Israel Museum, Jerusalem, Israel. Gimel Gallery, Jerusalem, Israel
- 1980 "New York Veil," Soho, New York City, US
- 1978 Tel-Aviv Museum, Julie M. Gallery, Tel-Aviv; Israel Museum, Jerusalem, Israel
- 1975 Richter Gallery, Julie M. Gallery & Artist Association, Tel-Aviv, Israel
- 1975 Israel Museum and Debel Gallery, Jerusalem, Israel
- 1974 "Drawings & More" Israel Museum, Jerusalem; Bertha Urdang Gallery, New York City, US
- 1973 Julie M. Gallery, Yodfat Gallery, Mabat Gallery, Dugit Gallery, Tel-Aviv. Debel Gallery, Jerusalem, Israel
- 1972 Dugit Gallery, Tel Aviv, Israel

== Awards and recognition ==
- 1995 Ministry of Culture and Education, Museums and Visual Arts Dep., Israel
- 1978 Con Edison Artist In Residence Program, NY
- 1975–77 American Israel Cultural Foundation. Art and Urban Resources, New York City
- 1969–71 Sharet Grant. Pnina Mandleblit Fund, Israel

== Public collections ==
- 2000–07 Ulmer Museum, Ulm, Germany.
- 2000 The National Gallery of Art, Washington DC., USA
- 2000 The Phoenix Collection of Israeli Art.
- 1997 The walker Museum, Minneapolis, Minnesota, USA.
- 1974–95 The Israel Museum, Jerusalem, Israel.
- 1975 The Israeli embassy, Washington DC, USA
- 1976–99 The Tel Aviv Museum, Tel Aviv.

== Selected reviews ==
- 2008 Haaretz, Dana Gilerman.
- 2006 Haaretz, Dalia Manor, Highlights from the Tel Aviv Museum of Art. August 6, 2006
- 2000 Art in America, April 2000, USA. Hayr, Ruti Deirector, May 5, 2000; "Private Wall" Benno Kalev collection: Haaretz, Uzi Zur, May 12 (p 14b); Maariv, Adam Baruch, April 28; "Family Tie" Hayr, Ruti Deirector, May 5, 2000.
- 1999 New York Times, November 26, 1999. The Jewish Week, November 26, 1999.
- 1998 Various German news papers in Ulm and Berlin, Germany. August / September 1998.
- 1991 Yediot Ahchronot America, "To Fuse the Broken," Riki Turk. Cover Magazine, "Mirit Cohen," Alan Moore.
- 1983 "Second Visit," from the Gordon Gallery collection, Gabi Ben Jano
- 1981 National Arts Guide (Exxon Guggenheim Exhibit), Peter Frank, New York City
- 1977 Yediot Ahchronot, Israeli Artist in New York, Adam Baruch.
- 1972–77 Art Magazines: Gazit (1972), Musage (1975), Kave (1984), and many principal Israeli newspapers

== Selected books ==
- 2006 Highlights from the Tel Aviv Museum, Dr. Mordechai Omer (ed), 100 years of Art in Israel, Gidon Ofrat.
- 2000 Wool From The Loom, Ed. Nathan Wasserman, Hebrew University, Jerusalem, Magnes Press.
- 2000 The Seventh Column / Natan Alterman. Israeli Art from Benno Kalev Collection, United Kibbutz Publication.
- 1987 "The Redefinition of Art in Israel", Art in Israel by Amnon Barzel. Milan, Italy
- The New Generation, Gideon Offrat & Binyamin Tamuz.
- Israeli Art History, Gila Cohen-Ballas

== See also ==
- Israeli art
