= Lilah Markman =

Israeli artist (born 1971)

- לילך מרקמן
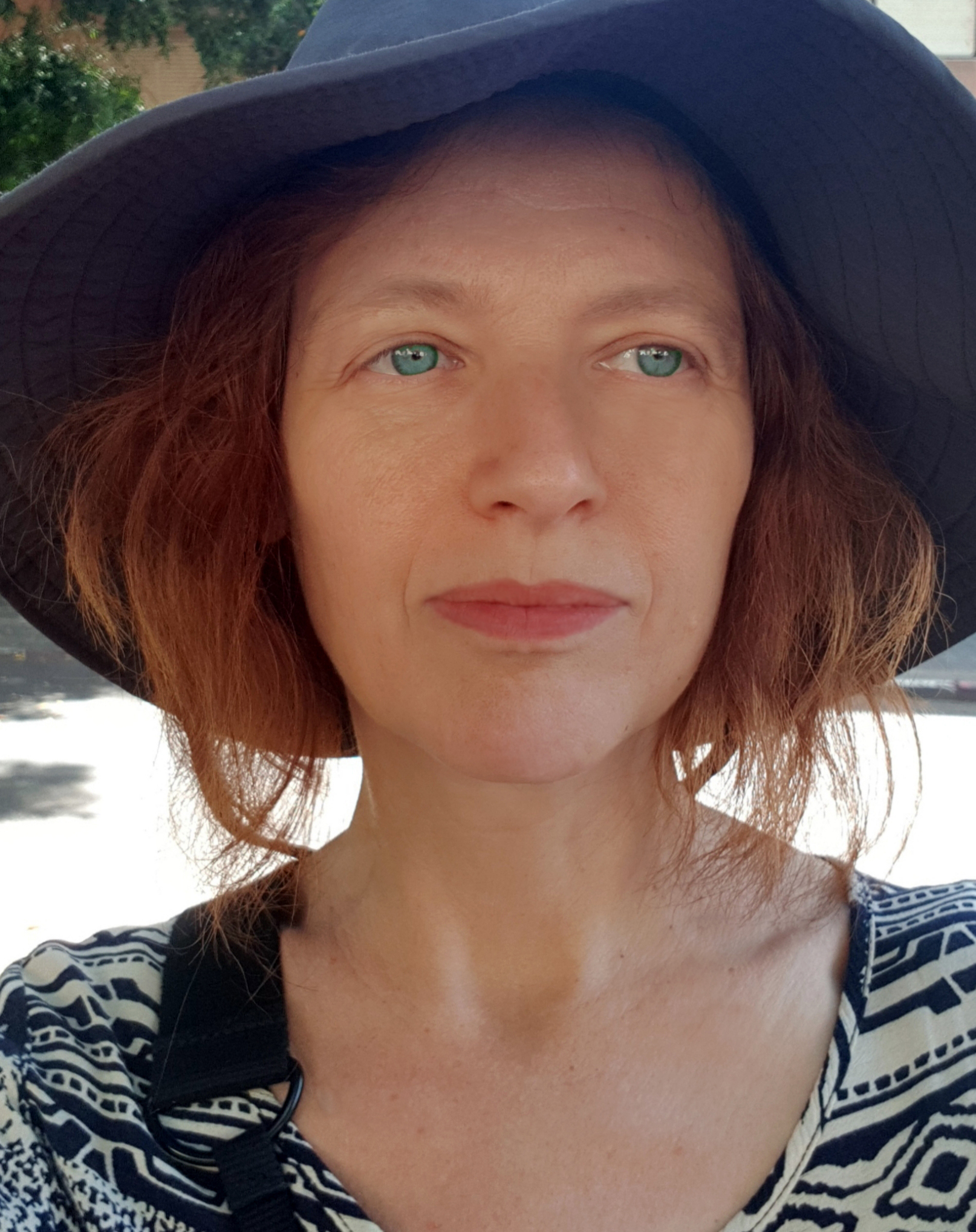
- Lilah Markman, 2018
- Born: Lilah Markman; January 1, 1971 (age 55); Israel
- Occupations: Contemporary artist; sculptor; photographer; painter; film director

Lilah Markman (Hebrew: לילך מרקמן; born January 1, 1971) is an Israeli contemporary artist, sculptor, photographer, painter, and documentary film director.

== Biography ==
Lilah Markman was born on January 1, 1971, and grew up in Nahariya. In 1995, Markman completed visual communication studies at the Bezalel Academy of Arts and Design in Jerusalem. In 2005, she graduated with BA in communication and psychology, from the Open University. In 2002, Markman earned her MFA in Film & Television from the Tel Aviv University. She studied in the postgraduate Fine Art Program at HaMidrasha Faculty of the Arts, Beit Berl College, which she completed in 2018.

== Filmmaking career ==
Markman wrote, directed and produced " Rock Paper Scissors," her 54-minute debut documentary released in 2018. The documentary received multiple awards from national and international film festivals.

== Awards and recognition ==
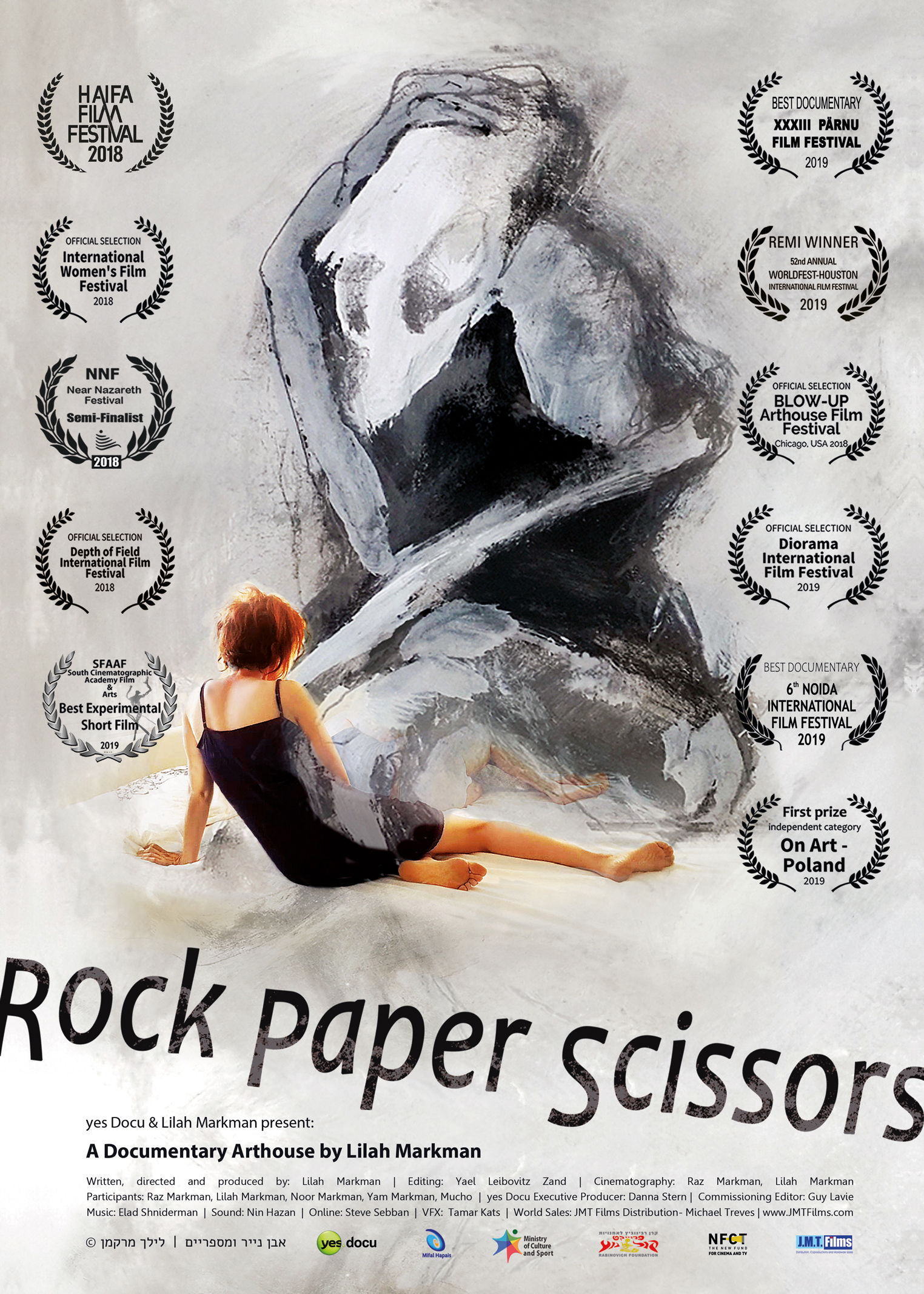
Poster of the movie Rock Paper Scissors

Rock Paper Scissors

- Exceptional Merit in Biography category, Docs Without Borders Film Festival (DWBFF), Nassau U.S.A., 2018
- OFFICIAL SELECTION, International Women's Film Festival, Orlando, Florida, 2018
- Best Short Documentary Film Award, NIFF Noida International Film Festival, India, 2019
- First prize, Independent category, On Art Film Festival, Poland, 2019
- Best Documentary Film Award, Pärnu International Documentary Film Festival, Estonia, 2019
- Bronze Remi Award, WorldFest-Houston International Film Festival, Texas U.S.A., 2019

== Selected exhibitions ==
=== Solo ===
- 2004: "Dream mache", The Farm Gallery, Holon, Israel
- 2005: "A different spirit", The Moshavim Gallery, Tel Aviv, Israel
- 2006: "Night bodies" - video art, sculpture and performance, HaMidrasha Art School, Beit Berl, Israel

=== Group ===
- 2006: "Disappearance", Petah Tikva Museum of Art, Petah Tikva, Israel
- 2017: "Remote viewing", Krakow Museum, Krakow, Poland
- 2018: "Flexibility Exercises", Yarkon Gallery, Tel Aviv, Israel
- 2019: "What the Matter Wants?", Givon Gallery, Tel Aviv, Israel
- 2022: A-Vitruvian- feminist activist group exhibition, Binyamin Gallery, Tel Aviv, Israel

== Gallery ==
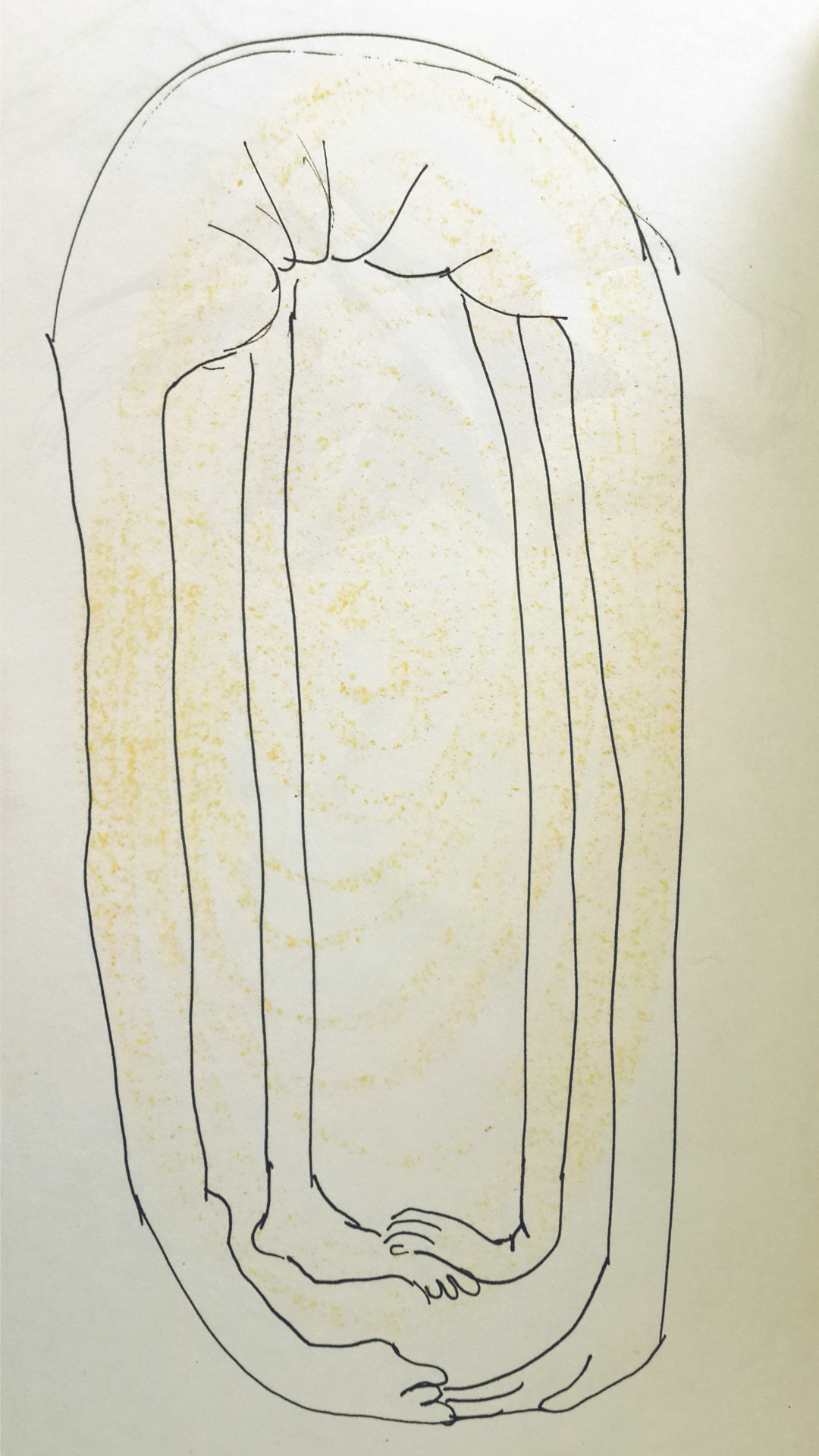
sketch, 2008

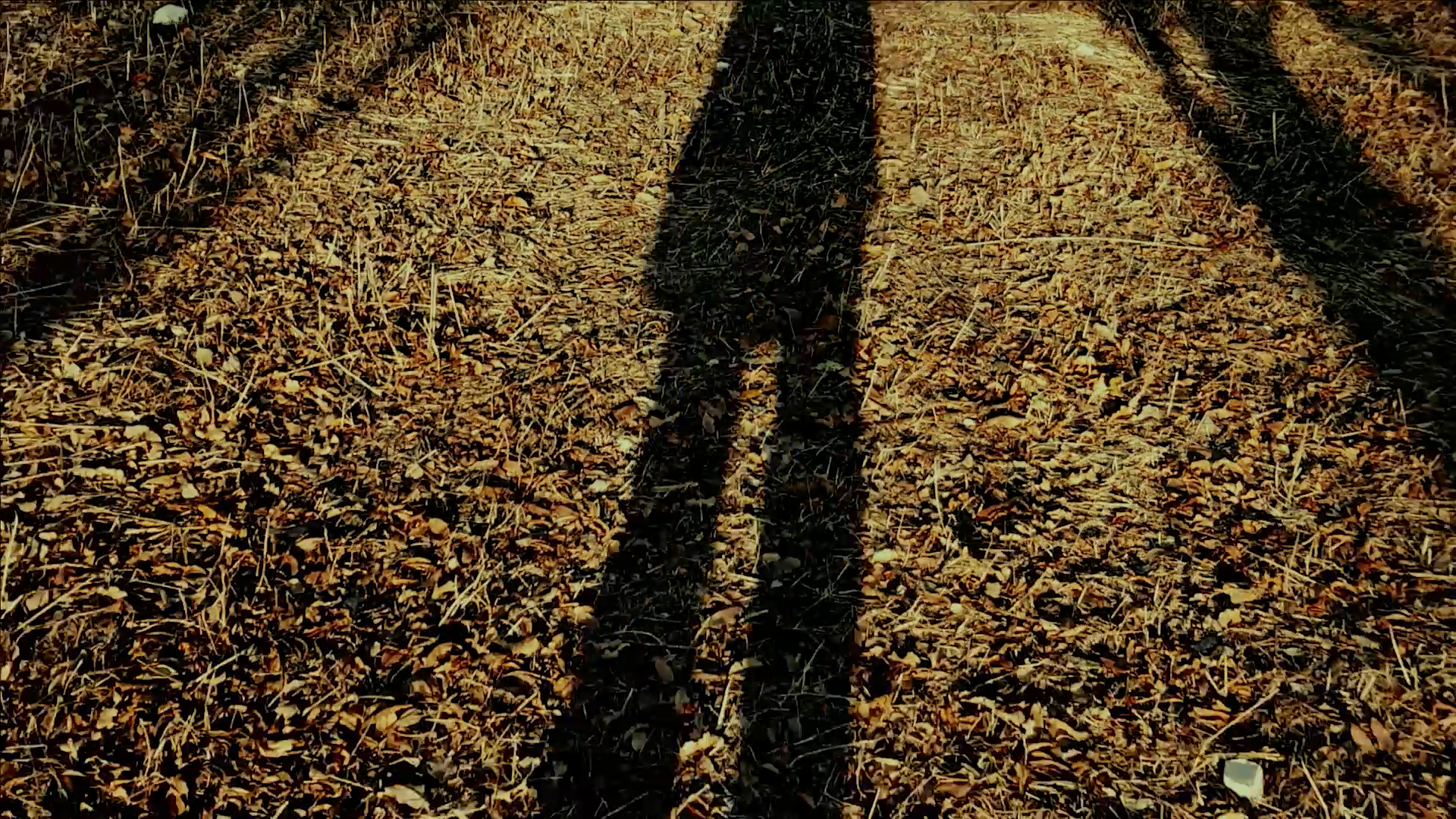
Self-portrait from the video work "In gross steps", 2017

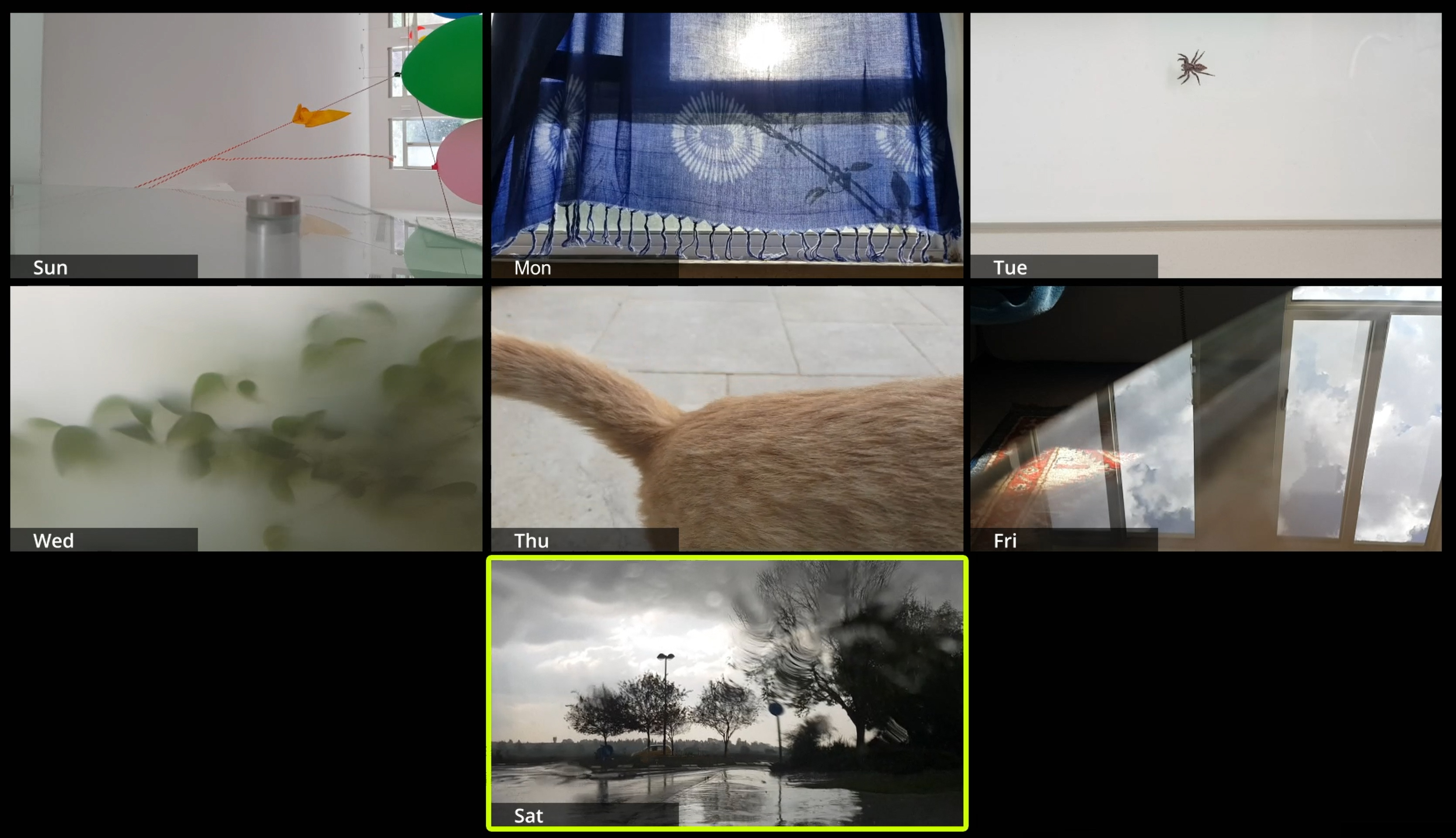
From the award winning experimental video art "Stand still", 2020

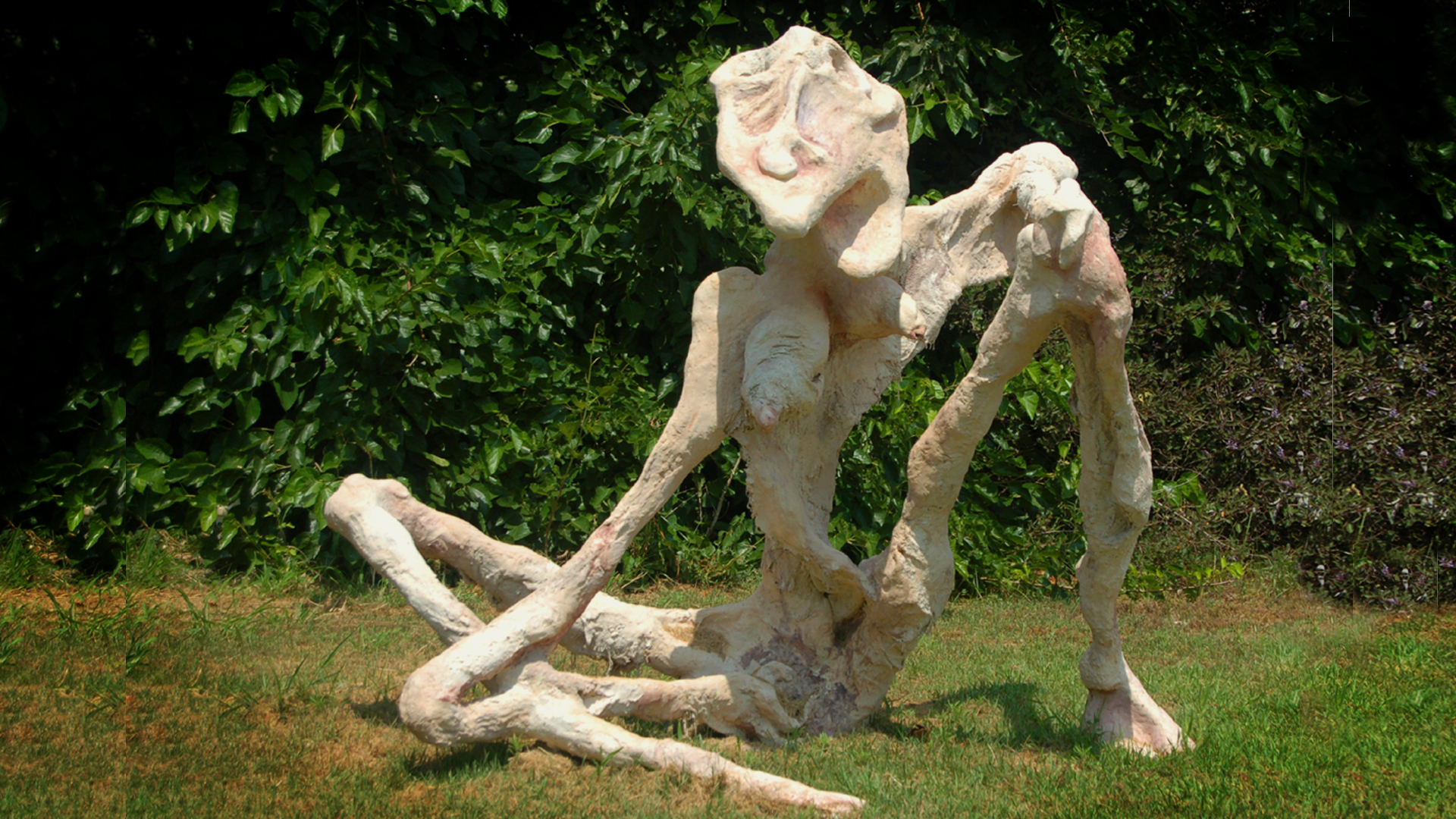
"Mother Earth" installation, concrete sculpture, 2 meters, Hamidrasha Faculty of Arts - Beit Berl, 2006

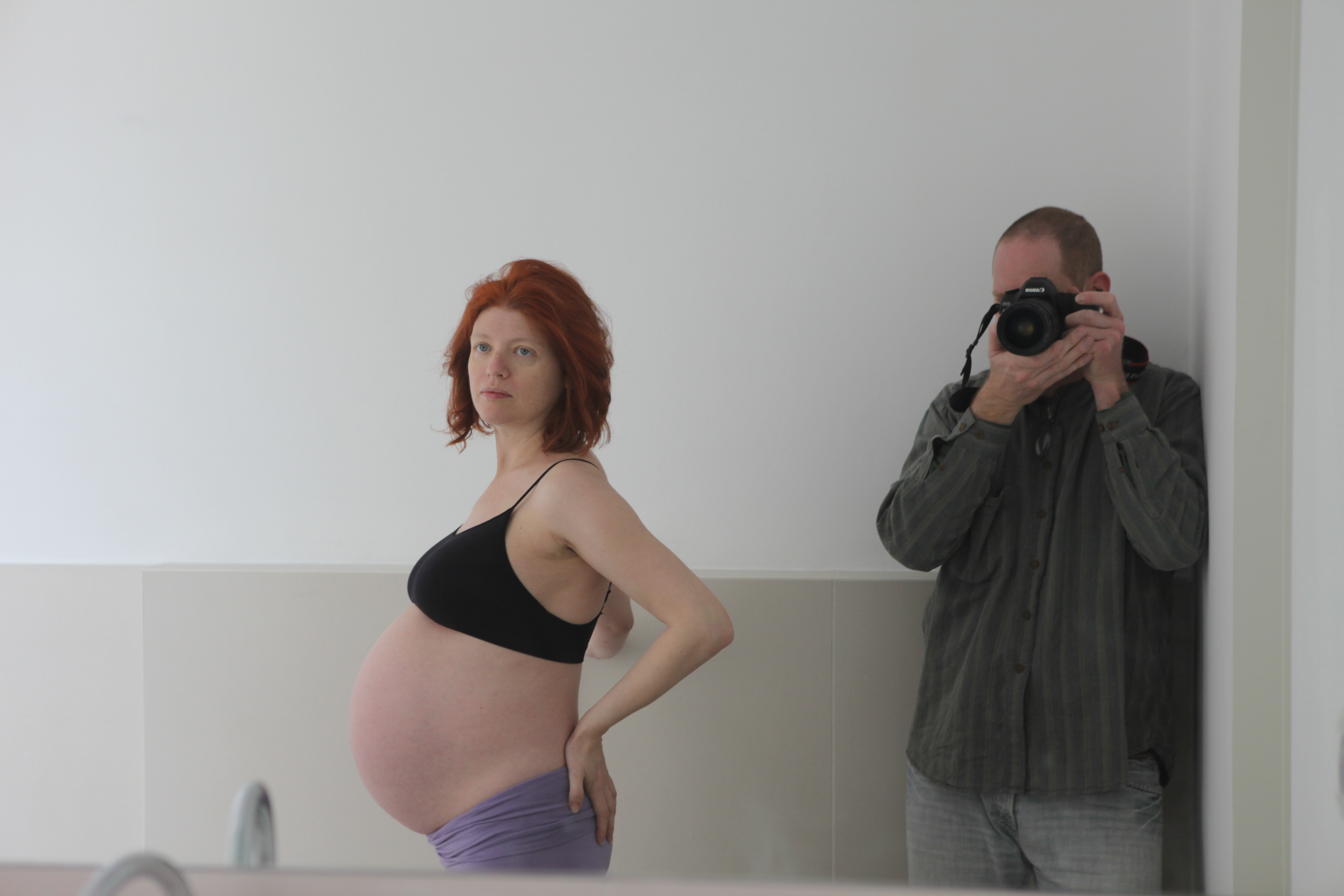
Family portrait, 2011. Photographed by Raz Markman, From "Rock Paper Scissors"

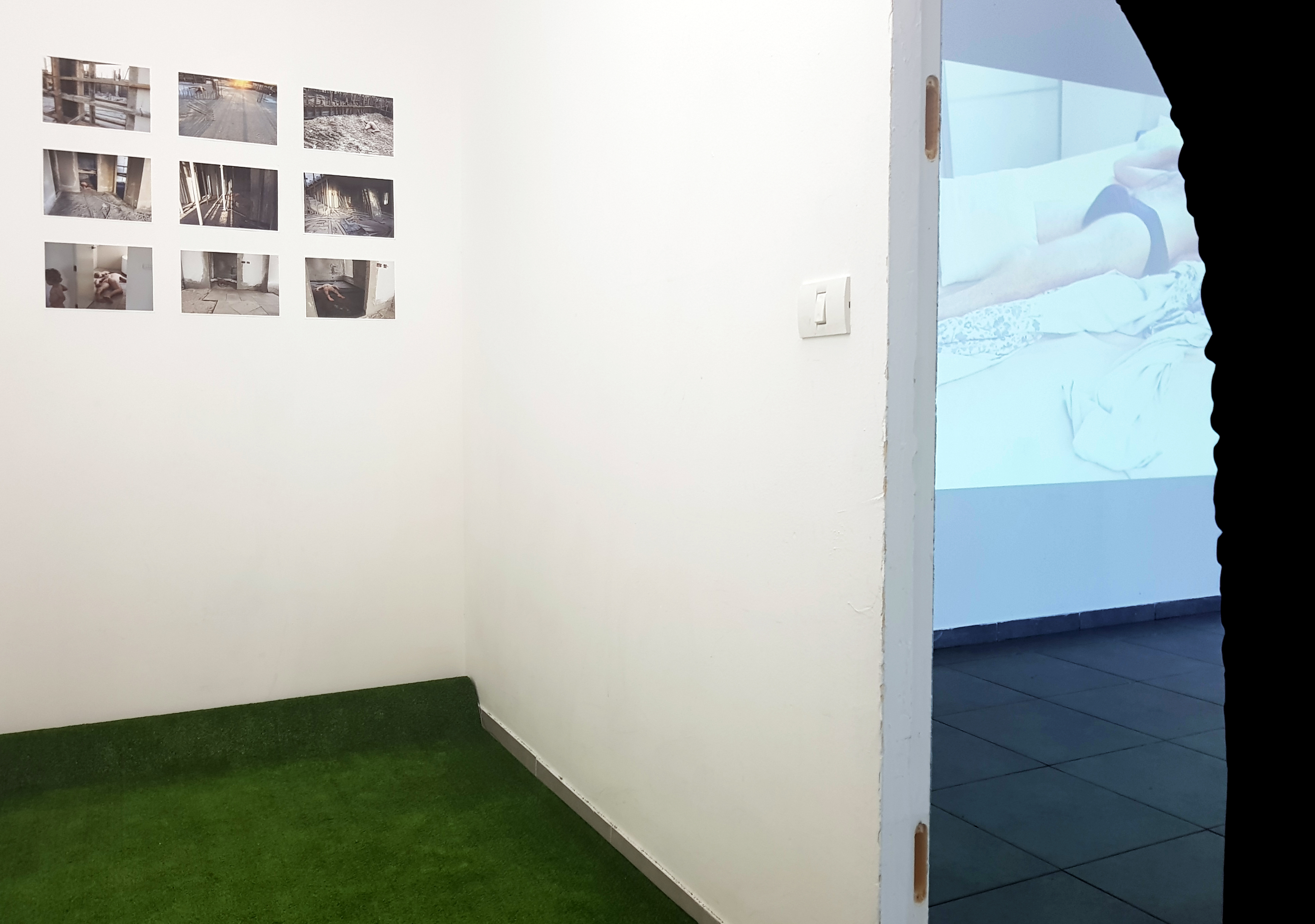
Installation at the Yarkon Gallery, 2018

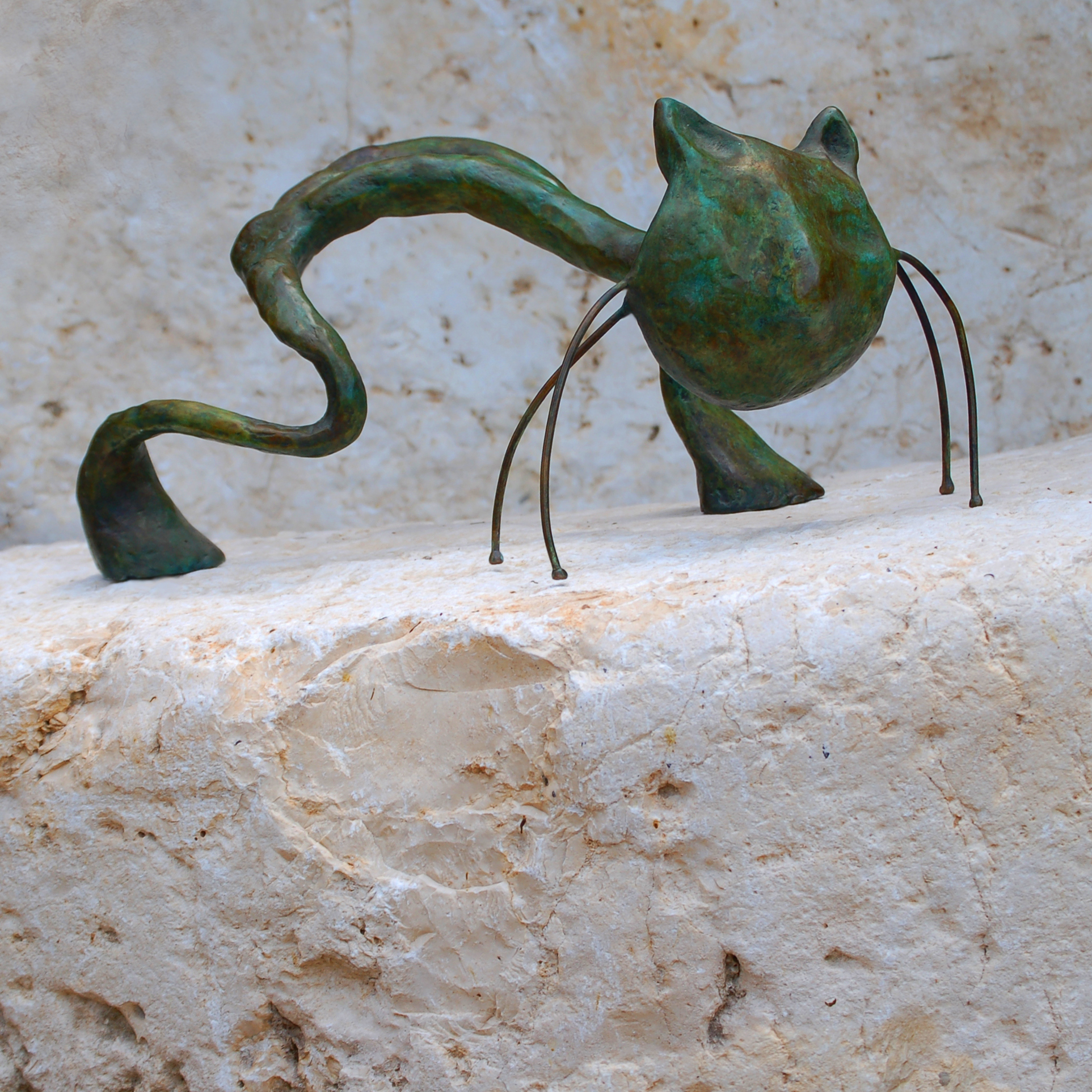
Bronze sculpture, 2007

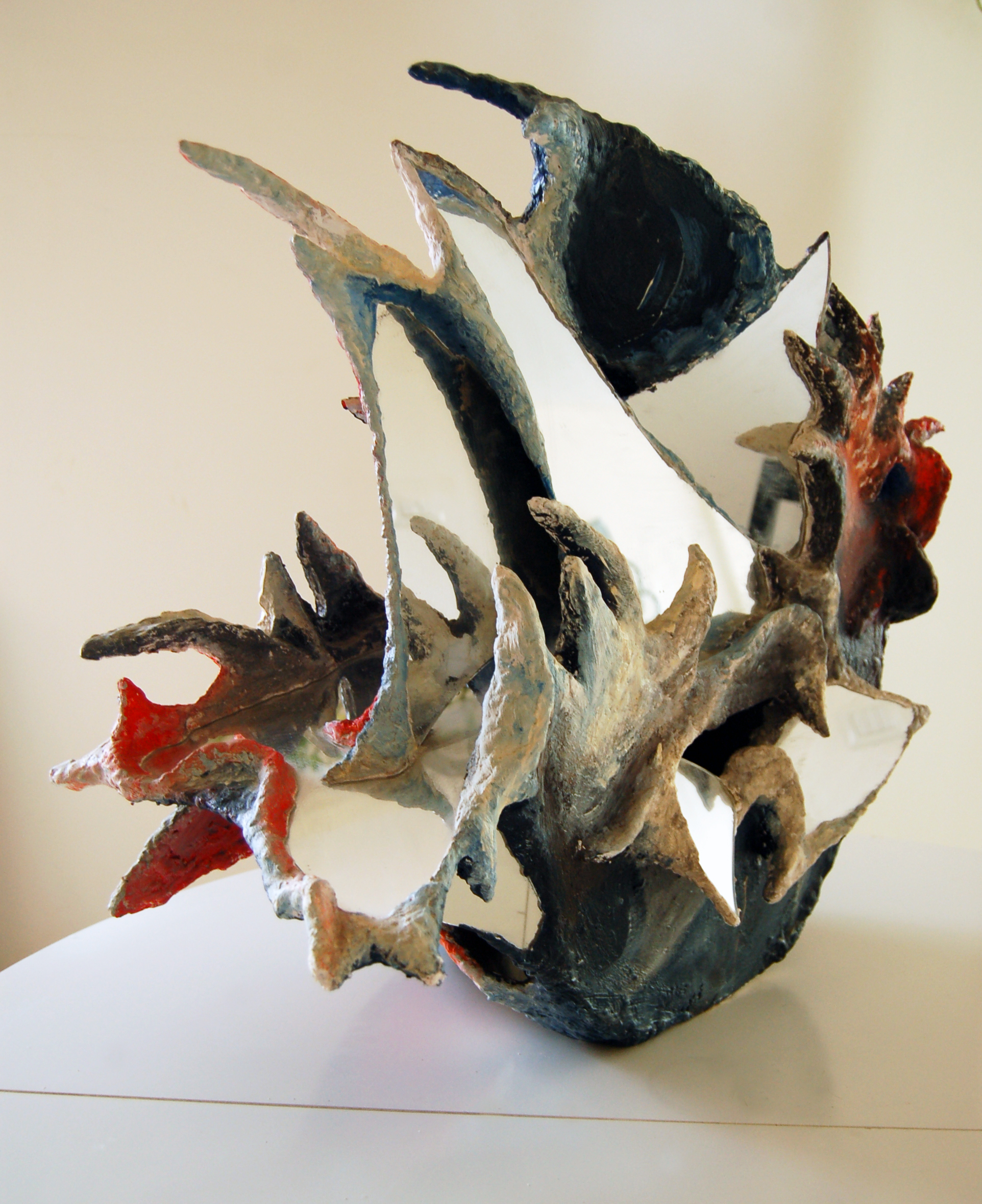
Mixed media, from "Dream mache", 2005

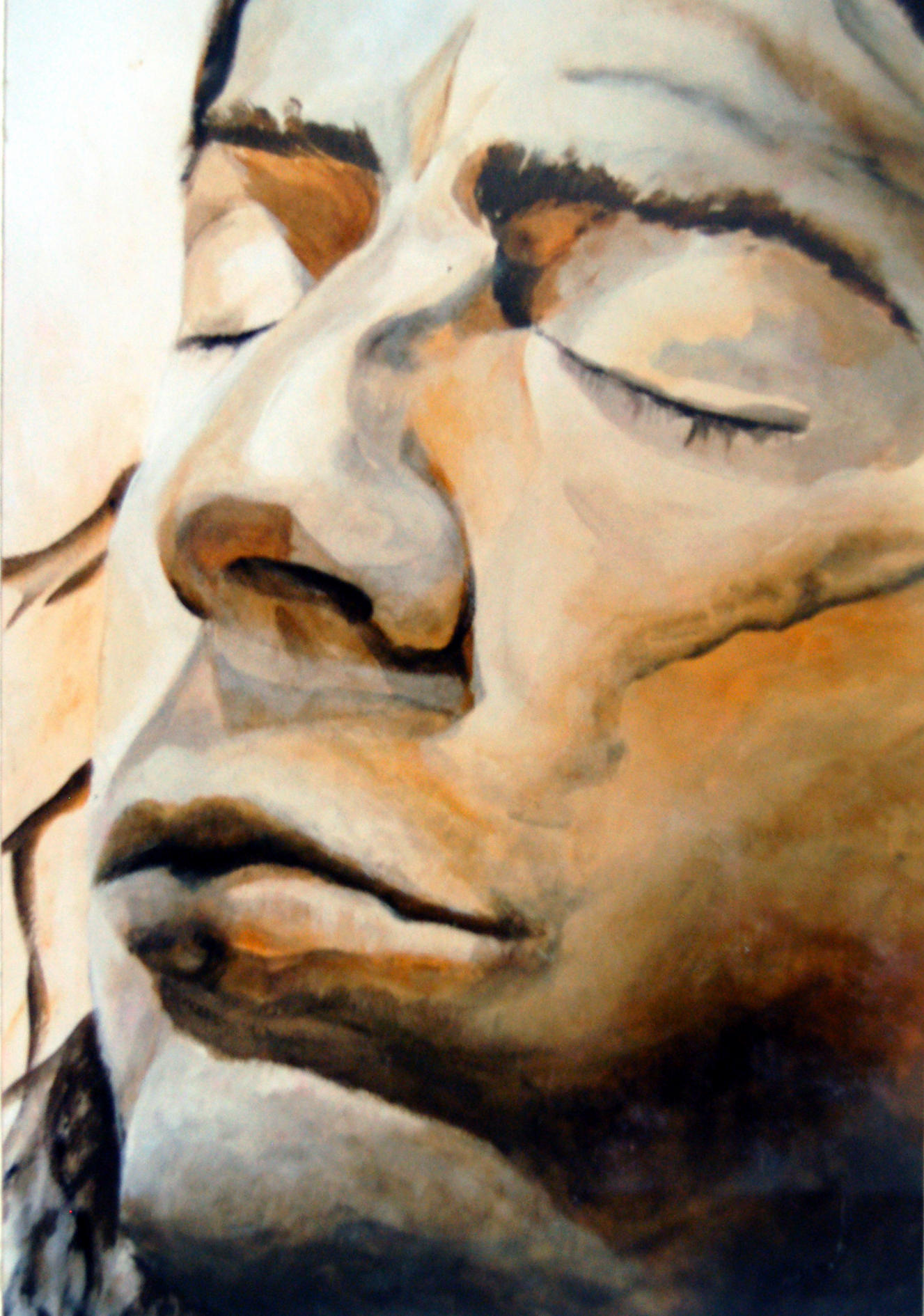
Acrylic painting on plywood, 1995

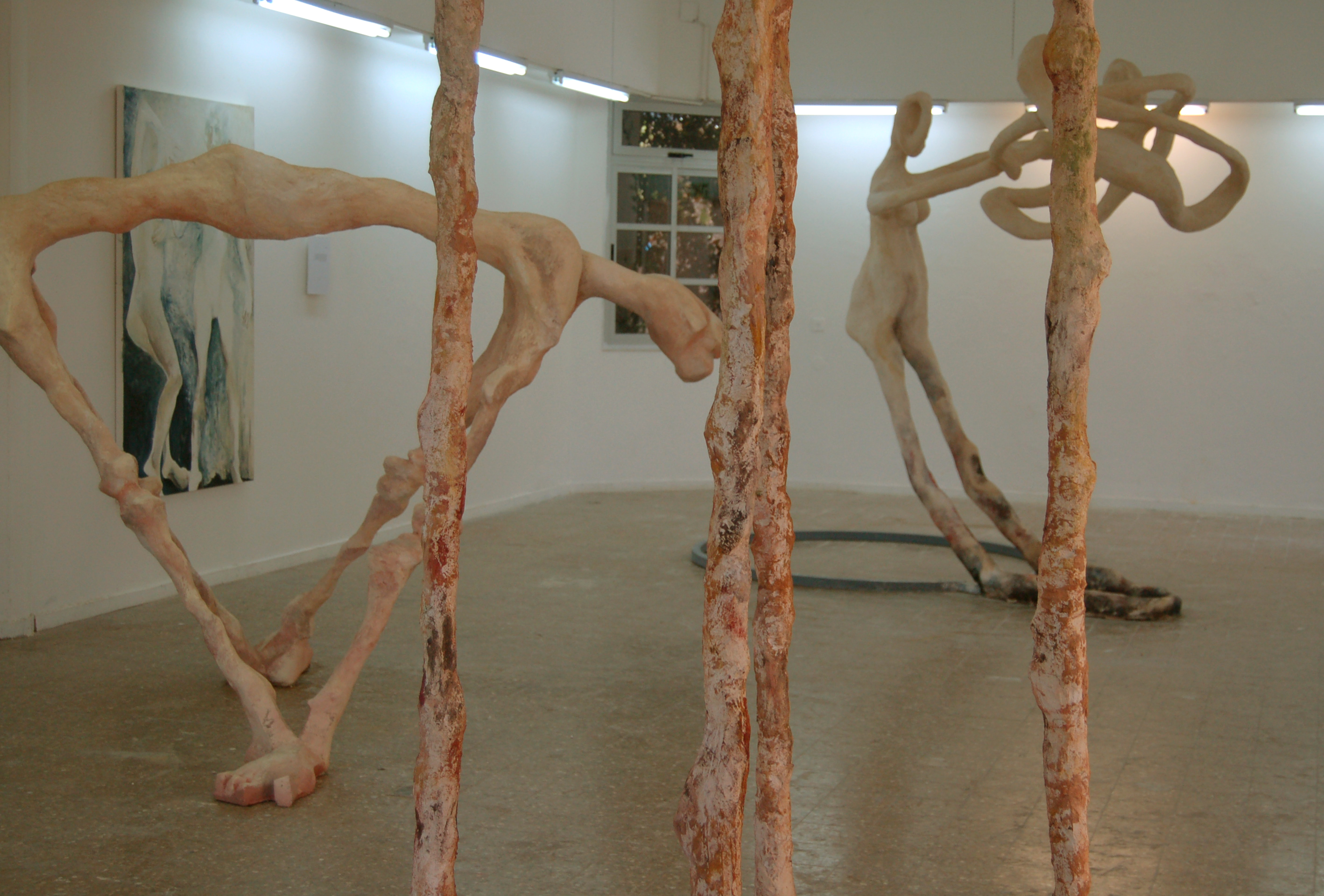
"Night bodies", Hamidrasha Faculty of Arts - Beit Berl, 2006
