= Hagit Shahal =

Israeli painter

Hagit Shahal חגית שחל
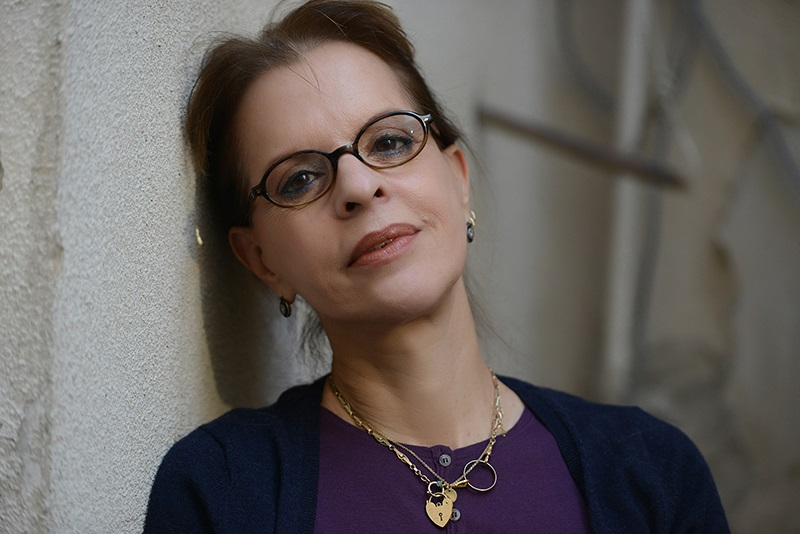
- Born: 1950 (age 75–76); Tel Aviv, Israel
- Known for: painter, print making
- Movement: Israeli art

Hagit Shahal (Hebrew: חגית שחל; born 1950 in Tel Aviv) is an Israeli painter.

== Biography ==
Hagit was born in 1950 in Tel Aviv. Her father, Moshe Shahal, was an activist in the Betar movement in Poland, and immigrated to Mandatory Palestine on his own as a teenager, before World War II. Her mother, Mina Shahal, also immigrated to Mandatory Palestine from Poland as a young child. Hagit's father was a lawyer, and her mother was a teacher.

From 1969 to 1972, Hagit studied art at the Free Academy in The Hague, Netherlands, after which she returned to Israel. She has since then lived and worked in Tel Aviv.

She studied lithography and screen printing with the artist Alima Rita in 1977-1978. She participated in two engraving workshops at Crown Point Press in San Francisco between 2010 and 2012.

From 1989 to 1991, Hagit worked as a courtroom sketch artist for ABC News in Israel, illustrating trials that were of interest to the foreign media. In 1991-1996, she worked as a courtroom sketch artist for Israel TV's Channel 2. In those capacities, she captured images from the John Demjanjuk trial and the Yigal Amir trial.

Between 1992 and 2000, Hagit worked for the Yedioth Ahronoth newspaper, where she illustrated the front pages of the weekend magazine, Hamusaf LeShabbat. The first person she depicted was Dahn Ben-Amotz, followed by the playwright, Hanoch Levin. She also painted portraits of Israeli politicians, including Aryeh Deri, Ehud Barak, David Levy, Benjamin Netanyahu, Avigdor Liberman, and Haim Ramon, as well as portraits of foreign political figures such as Bill Clinton, Hassan Nasrallah, Slobodan Milošević, King Hussein, and others.

Since 1975, Hagit has been teaching painting and drawing in different frameworks, including the Kalischer Art School in Tel Aviv, the Meimad School of Visual Arts in Tel Aviv, the Painters and Sculptors Association in Tel Aviv, the Arsuf workshop in Rishpon, and at her studio in Tel Aviv.

She was one of the founders of Impact, which is a non-profit organization established in 2002 by the Association of Visual Artists in Israel. She served as a board member until 2008.

In 2015, she joined the Association for Women's Art and Gender Research in Israel, founded by Dr. Ruth Markus, and was elected as a member of the board of Directors, of which she is a member today.
