= Nurit Yarden =

Israeli art photographer (born 1959)

- נורית ירדן
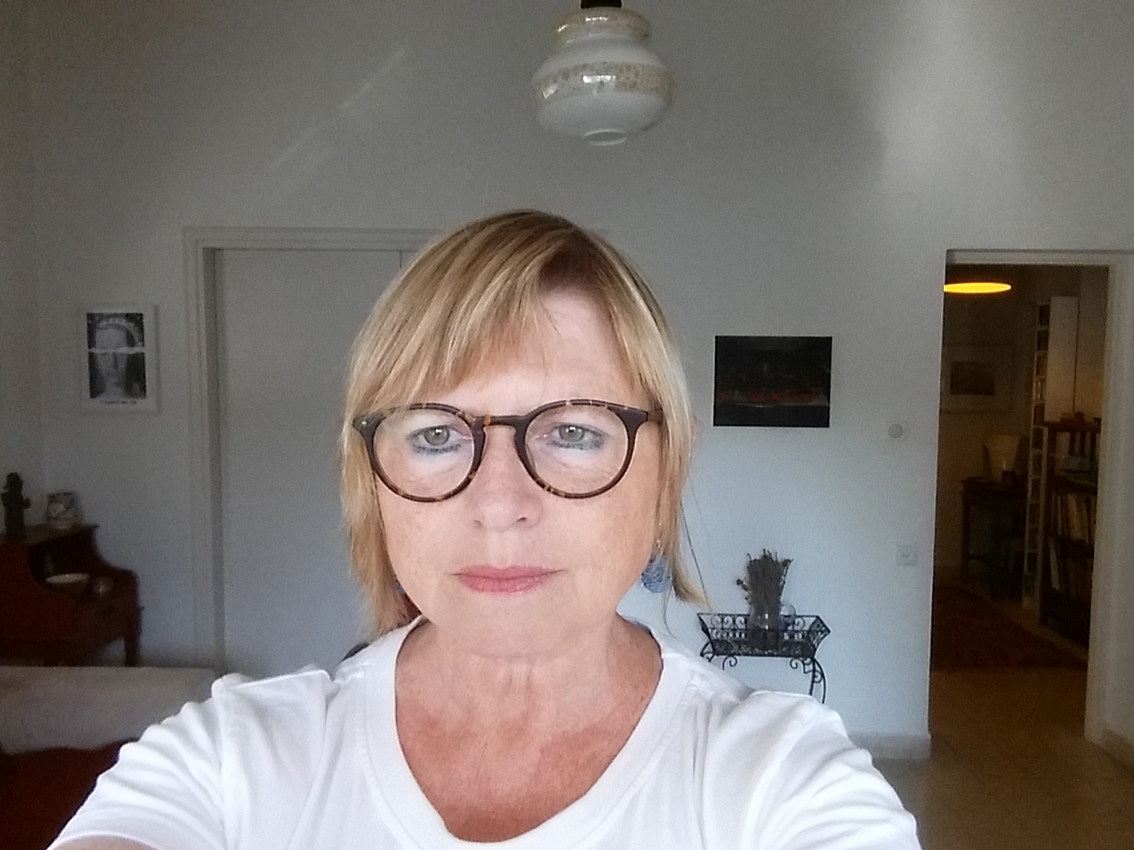
- Born: 1959 (age 66–67); Tel Aviv
- Education: Bezalel Academy of Art and Design
- Occupation: photographer

Nurit Yarden (Hebrew: נורית ירדן; born 1959) is an Israeli art photographer, who lives and works in Tel Aviv. She won the Israel Ministry of Culture Prize for the Encouragement of Visual Arts in 2002.

== Biography ==
Yarden was born in Israel, 1959. Grew up in Paris and in Tel Aviv where she now lives and works. An artist photographer who earned her BFA degree from the Photography Department of Bezalel Academy of Art and Design in Jerusalem (1986). Was represented by the Chelouche Art Gallery in Tel Aviv for 10 years, and at present she works as an independent artist and an instructor and teacher of photography.

When she completed her studies at Bezalel, she researched, for a decade, the concept of the Family album as representing our yearning for happiness and the fantasy of an idyllic family. In recent years, she has been working on a visual diary based on wandering, where she explores questions about the Israeli public sphere, looking for visual, social, and political signs that penetrate it. Her works combine images with texts and integrate direct and staged photography. The desire to become acquainted with the society in which she lives and to better understand how the public space reflects it has led Yarden to initiate Sojourn – an independent long-term residency project that began in 2015; its end date is yet unknown. Her goal is to sojourn in all the various types of settlements in Israel, including all sectors of the population: Jews, Muslims, Christians, Druze, Bedouins. Three times a year, she travels to a locality in Israel with which she is not familiar and stay there for one week. She finds a local contact who connects her to several local social activists, either those born there or long-term residents. She arranges to meet them in advance. In the first three days of a sojourn, she meets with the activists and learn about the place from as many aspects as possible. Yarden keeps a diary with quotes from the meetings and photograph afterwards. The process of photographing is based on wandering but it is affected by everything she has heard. She keeps in touch with at least one person from every sojourn and go back there occasionally. Up till now, she has created a digital library that she uploaded to her website. It's made up of sixteen books, one for each sojourn, from the accumulated visual and textual materials. The project has additional manners of presentation: lectures, exhibitions, printed books.

Yarden has had numerous solo exhibitions, among others: The New Gallery Teddy, Jerusalem (2024), Herzliya Museum of Contemporary Art (2019), Tel Aviv Artists House (2014), Contemporary by Golconda Gallery, Tel Aviv (2013), Chelouche Art Gallery, Tel Aviv (2000, 2002, 2005, 2007, 2010), and has participated in many group exhibitions in Israel, Europe, and the United States, among others: Circle1 Gallery, Berlin (2018), Bat-Yam Museum (2011), Jewish Museum, Munich (2010), Artneuland Gallery, Berlin (2008), Tel Aviv Museum of Art (2002, 2003), Israel Museum Youth wing, Jerusalem (2002, 2005, 2014), Artforum Berlin (2002), Margolis Gallery, Houston (2000), Israel Museum, Jerusalem (1998).

Yarden created a Digital library of the "Sojourn" project on her website. She published the Artist Book, "Homeland," following her solo exhibition, Herzliya Museum (2019); the catalog, "Within Walking Distance," following her exhibition in the Contemporary by Golconda Gallery, Tel Aviv (2013); and the Artist Book, "Family Meal", Am Oved Publishers (2007). Her works were also published at the "Scene of Events" exhibition catalog, Herzliya Museum (2019); "Myth and Prejudice" exhibition catalog, Beit Hatfutsot Museum, Tel Aviv (2014); "Schooling" exhibition catalog, the Bat Yam Museum (2011); and "Family Files" exhibition catalog, Jewish Museum, Munich (2010).

Yarden won the Israel Ministry of Culture Prize for the Encouragement of Visual Arts (2002), and the America-Israel Cultural Foundation Scholarship (1985). Her works are a part of numerous art collections in Israel: The Israel Museum, Jerusalem, Herzliya Museum, Bat-Yam Museum, The O.R.S. Art Collection, The Comme il Faut Art Collection, as well as Private Collections.

== Studies ==
- 1982-1986 – Photography, B.F.A, Bezalel Academy of Art and Design, Jerusalem
- 1981-1982 – Psychology and History of Art, University of Haifa
- 1980-1981 – Photography, Camera Obscura School of Art, Tel-Aviv

== Awards ==
- 2002 - Israel Ministry of Culture Prize for the Encouragement of Visual Arts
- 1985 - America-Israel Cultural Foundation Scholarship
