= Liliane Klapisch =

Israeli painter (born 1933)

Liliane Klapisch ליליאן קלאפיש
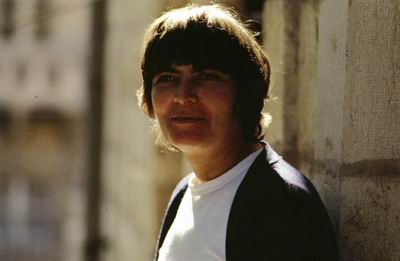
- Liliane Klapisch
- Born: 1933 (age 92–93); Cachan, France
- Education: Académie Ranson, Paris
- Known for: Painting
- Movement: Israeli art

Liliane Klapisch (Hebrew: ליליאן קלאפיש; born 1933) is a French-born Israeli painter.

== Biography ==
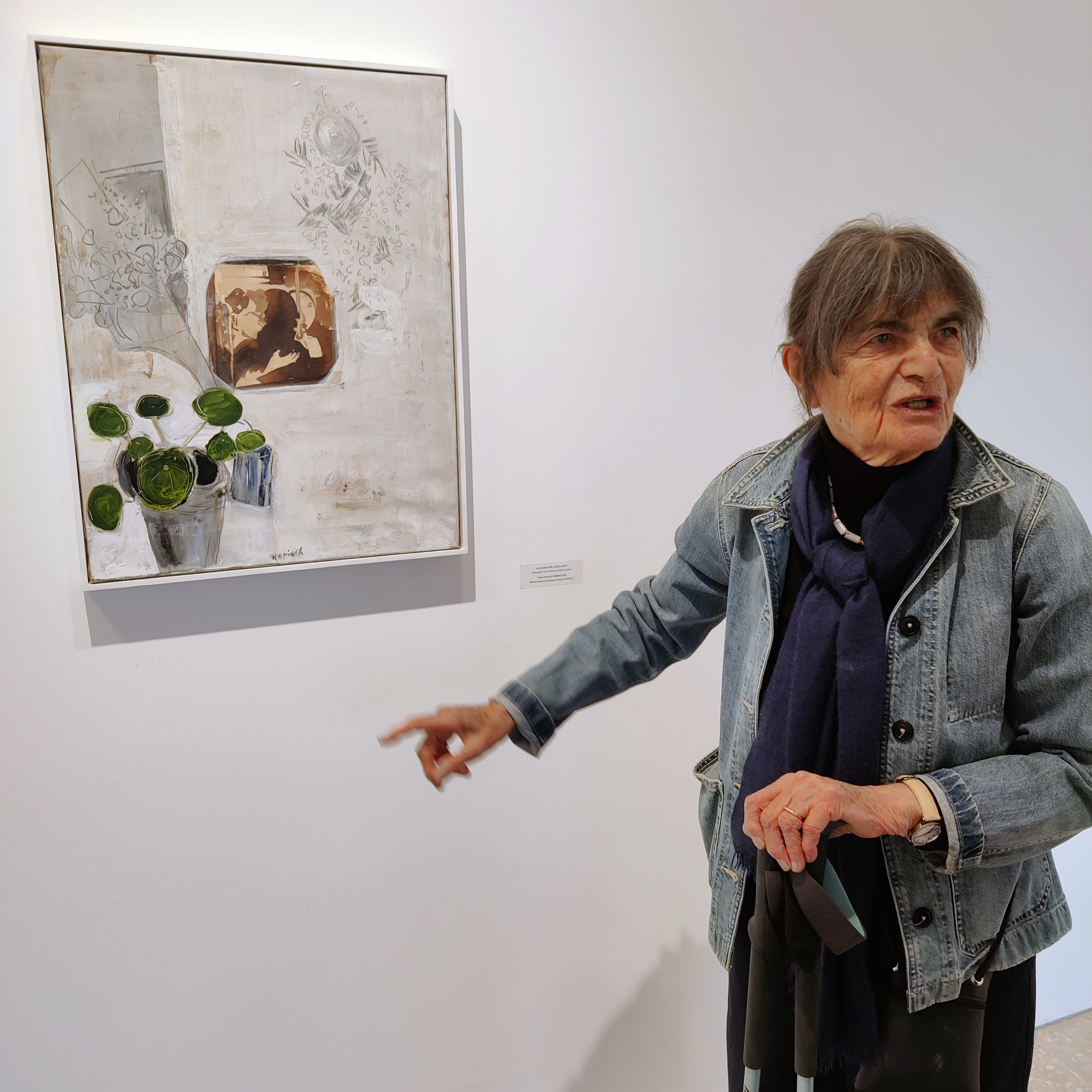
Liliane Klapisch, 2022

Liliane Klapisch was born in 1933, in Cachan, France. She studied at the Académie Ranson, Paris from 1948 through 1949. Klapisch lived in Morocco from 1958 to 1959, and immigrated to Israel in 1969. She lives and works in Jerusalem and Paris. Her work is in the Haifa Museum of Art, the Israel Museum, and the Tel Aviv Museum of Art.
