= Naomi Leshem =

Israeli photographer (born 1963)

- נעמי לשם
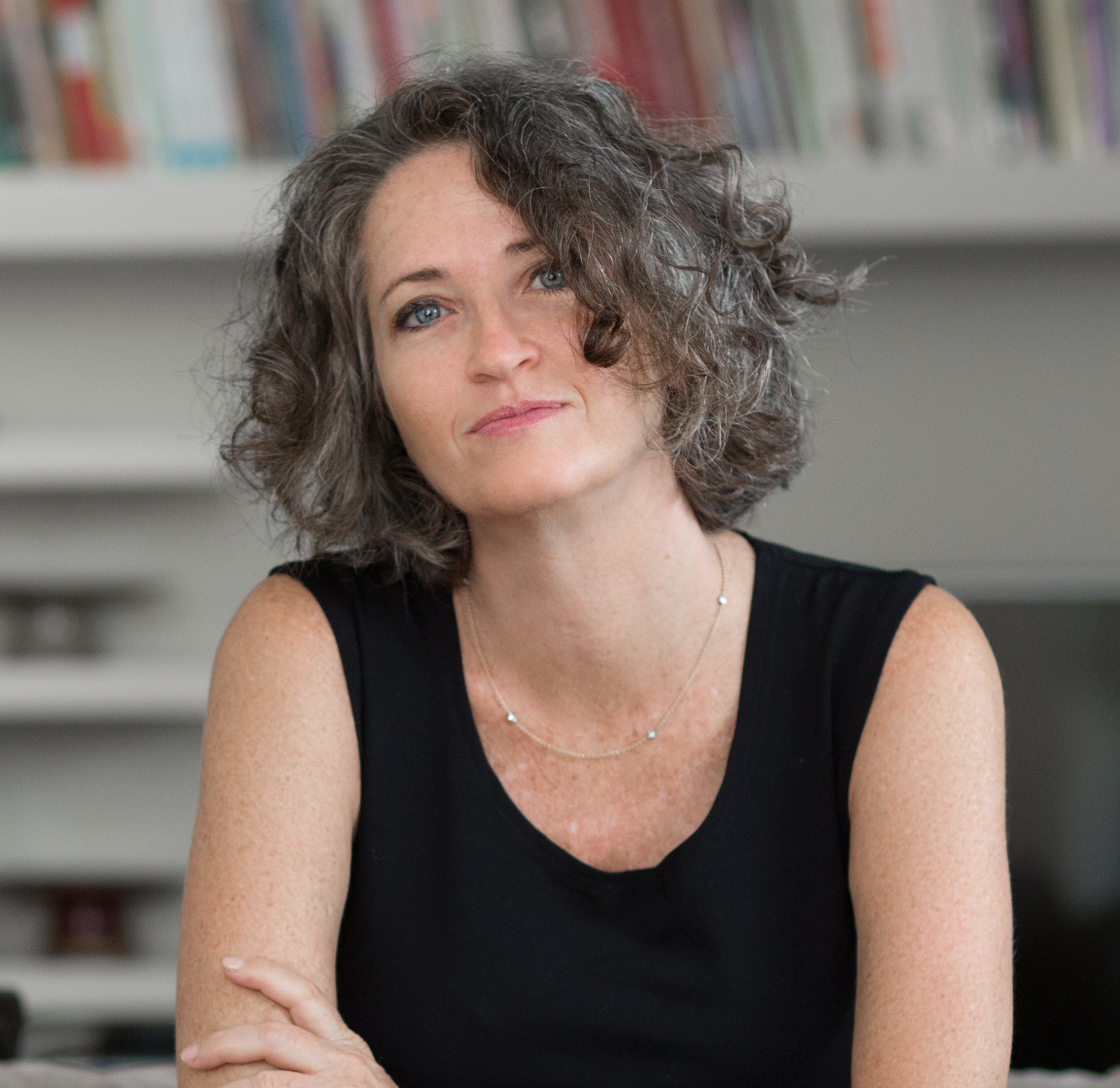
- Leshem in 2017
- Born: 1963 (age 62–63); Jerusalem, Israel
- Citizenship: Israel
- Occupation: Photographer
- Awards: Constantiner Photography Award for an Israeli Artist
- Website: https://www.naomileshem.com/

Naomi Leshem (Hebrew: נעמי לשם; born 3 November 1963) is an Israeli photographer. Her works are in the collections of the Israel Museum in Jerusalem, the Tel Aviv Museum of Art, the Norton Museum of Art in Florida, USA. She received the Constantiner Photography Award for an Israeli Artist from the Tel Aviv Museum of Art in 2009.

== Biography ==
Leshem was born in Jerusalem, Israel. In 1987, she graduated from the Department of Photography at Hadassah Academic College in Jerusalem. In 1984–1985, she studied General and German Studies at the University of Fribourg, Switzerland. In 2014, she received the Mifal HaPayis Arts and Culture Grant. Her photographs feature a range of conceptual explorations of multiple levels of life alongside death, an area in which her work has been influenced by her life as a second-generation Holocaust survivor and an IDF widow from a young age, as well as by the collective Israeli experience.

She teaches at various art schools.

== Works ==
Leshem's artworks have been shown in the Tel Aviv Museum of Art, Israel Museum in Jerusalem, Rietberg Museum in Zürich, Norton Museum of Art, Florida, Noga Gallery in Tel Aviv, Andrea Meislin Gallery in New York and in the Ncontemporary Gallery in London.

Following the Constantiner Photography Award, an exhibition of her series Runways was held at the Tel Aviv Museum of Art in 2009–2010.

Another exhibition of her work, Ghosts of Others was held at Noga Gallery of Contemporary Art in Tel Aviv in 2019. In this exhibition, Naomi Leshem departed from her custom of beginning from moments in her own biography and instead used images originating from other people's individual or collective history as her points of departure— from images photographed in the trenches of WWI in Alsace, to a close-up of a Belgian locket from the 1940s lying on the chest of a young Israeli woman.

Sleepers is another series by Leshem, in which she photographed teenagers in Israel, Switzerland, France, and the United States, over a period of three years, in various stages of their sleep in their bedrooms. The series explores portraiture and the interim state of sleep as a representation of a stage between life and death in different cultures and religions. The series was exhibited in the Israel Museum in Jerusalem, the Andrea Meislin Gallery in New York City, the Kunst(zeug)Haus Rapperswil in Switzerland, and other galleries. A book of the exhibition was published jointly by the Swiss publisher Benteli and the Israeli publisher Even Hoshen. The book contains 32 images of sleeping children alongside text written specifically for the works by Israeli writer Eshkol Nevo, Israeli artists Eran Tzur and Reuven Kupperman, Swiss writer Urs Faes, German poet and novelist Ulla Hahn, and Serbian-Canadian writer David Albahari.

== Collections ==
- Israel Museum, Jerusalem
- Tel Aviv Museum of Art
- Norton Museum of Art, Florida, USA
- Meeschaert Collection, Paris

== Bibliography ==
- Roelin, Peter; Guggenheimer, Michael (2009). Naomi Leshem – Runways. Benteli Verlag. ISBN 9783716515822. OCLC 881765860.
- Roelin, Peter; Guggenheimer, Michael (2011). Naomi Leshem - Sleepers. Benteli Verlag. ISBN 9783716516720. OCLC 731900140.
- Centered : Naomi Leshem. Andrea Meislin Gallery. 2014. ISBN 9789655557220. OCLC 958059514.
