= Kibbutzim College =

College in Tel Aviv, Israel

Coordinates: 32°06′07″N 34°47′22″E

Kibbutzim College of Education, Technology and the Arts
- סמינר הקיבוצים
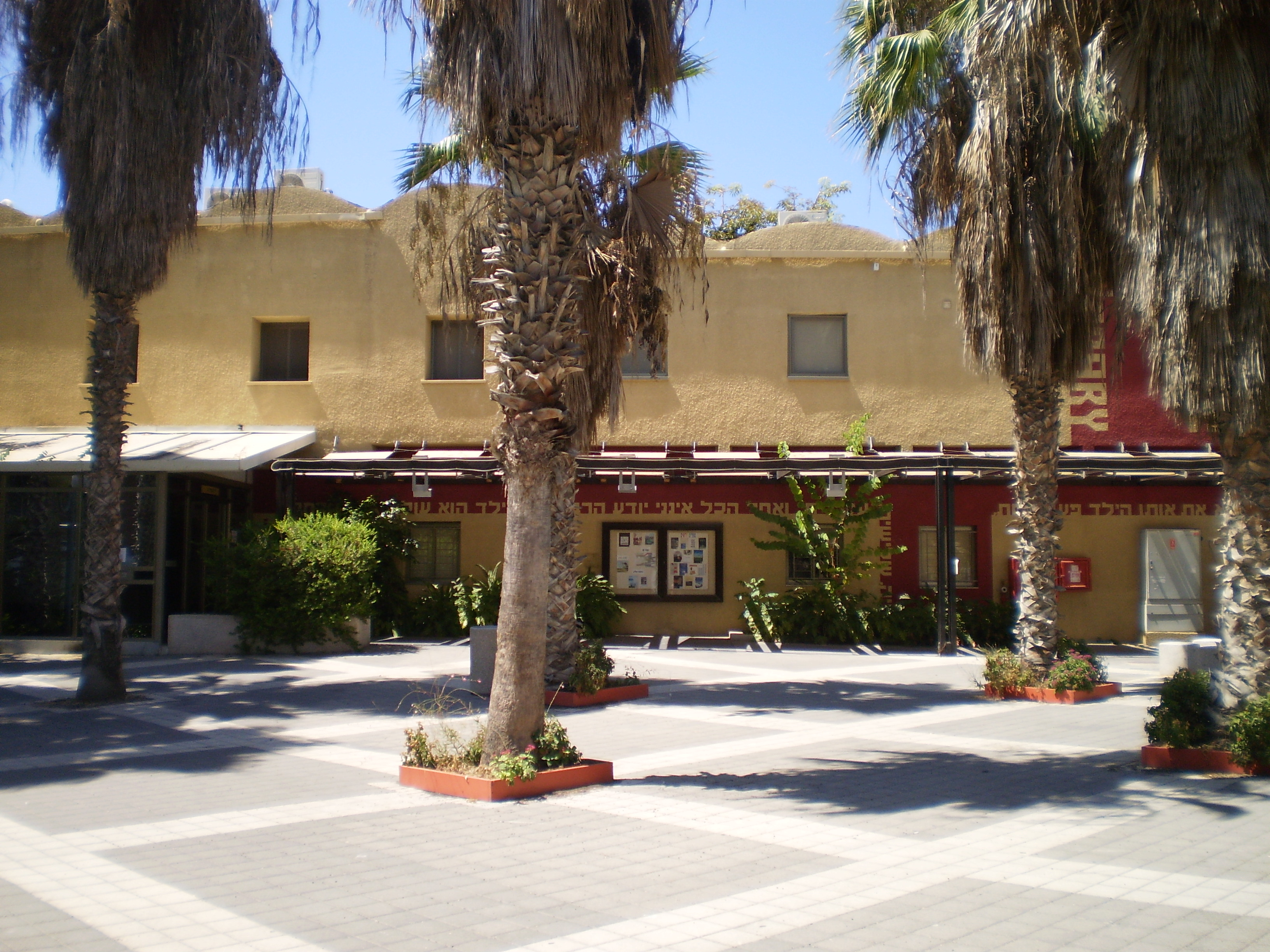
- Kibbutzim College library
- Type: Private
- Established: 1939
- Affiliations: Kibbutz Movement
- Students: 6,000
- Location: Tel Aviv, Israel
- Website: www.smkb.ac.il

Kibbutzim College of Education, Technology and the Arts (Hebrew: סמינר הקיבוצים, Seminar HaKibbutzim) is an academic college in Tel Aviv, Israel. The college offers undergraduate and graduate degree programs, teacher certification programs, Post Graduate Certificate of Education (P.G.C.E) and other related certified studies. It is the largest teacher education college in Israel, with over 6,000 students. Around a quarter of teachers in Israel graduated from the college.

== History ==
Kibbutzim College was founded in 1939 by members of the Kibbutz Movement in order to train teachers and educators. It was initially located on Ahad HaAm Street in Tel Aviv, later moved to Lilienblum Street, and in 1943 relocated to Bnei Dan Street. In 1961, the college moved to its present main site on 149 Namir Road in Tel Aviv.

In 1988, as part of the academization process of teacher-training colleges in Israel, Kibbutzim College was recognized as an institution of higher education and was authorized to grant the Bachelor of Education (B.Ed.) degree and teaching certificate.

In the early 2000s, as part of the continued academization of teacher-training colleges in Israel, the college received approval from the Council for Higher Education to offer master's degree programs (M.Ed.). It later received authorization to offer the Master of Teaching (M.Teach) and the Master of Arts in Arts Therapy (M.A.A.T.).

In 2008, Kibbutzim College merged with the College for Teaching Technology, and its name was changed to ''Kibbutzim College of Education, Technology and the Arts''. Following the merger, the college expanded its academic fields to include art, design, communication, and film.

In 2015, the college moved from funding by the Ministry of Education to funding by the Planning and Budgeting Committee (PBC) of the Council for Higher Education.

== See also ==
- Academic staff of Kibbutzim College
- Kibbutzim College alumni
- List of Israeli universities and colleges
