= Friedel Stern =

Israeli cartoonist and illustrator

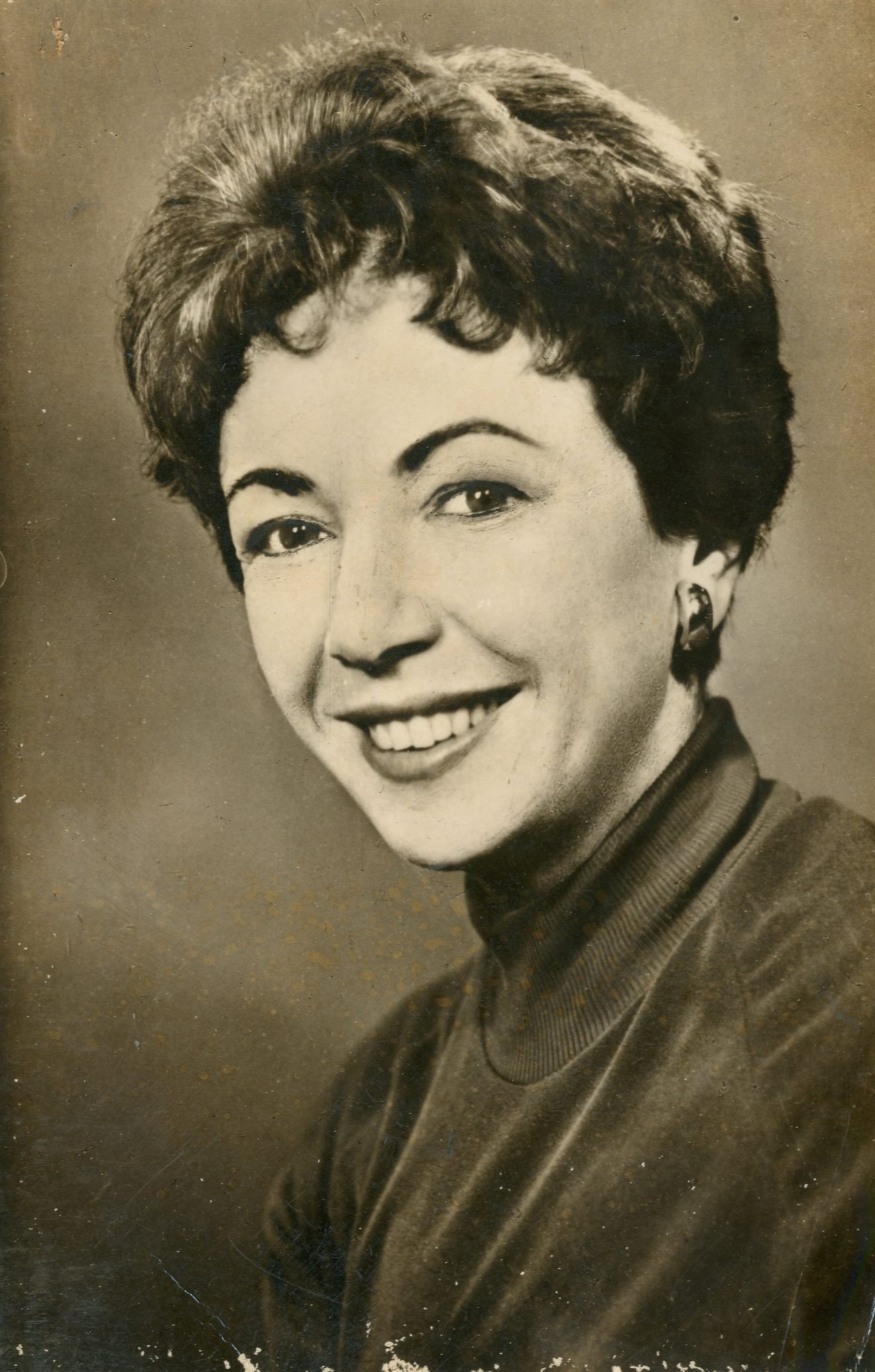
- Born: 1917 Leipzig, Germany
- Died: October 29, 2006 Tel Aviv, Israel
- Areas: cartoonist, illustrator

Friedel Stern (Hebrew: פרידל שטרן; 1917 Leipzig, Germany - October 29, 2006, Tel Aviv, Israel) was a German-born Israeli cartoonist and illustrator.

== Biography ==
Friedel Stern was born in Leipzig, Germany, in 1917, eldest of four children. Her family was Jewish but not Zionist. However, when antisemitism began to take hold in Germany, she stopped her art studies, and, encouraged by her mother, joined the Jewish Scouts movement. She immigrated to Palestine with this group in 1936 to kibbutz Kfar Maccabi. However, a short while later she moved to Haifa. She worked as a cook and housemaid and took evening courses in sketching with Professor Hoenich. At the end of the 1930s, she studied art and design at Bezalel art school in Jerusalem.

During the Second World War, she joined the volunteers in the Auxiliary Women's Corps of the British Army as a nurse. In the early 1940s, she was sent to serve in the officers' school in Gaza and joined the liberation army in Italy, where she was assigned to the camouflage unit. During the war, she sketched and illustrated scenes depicting the daily life of the British soldiers. In 1944, she showed her sketches at the exhibition "Allied Forces Artists" in Egypt. For her military service, Friedel was awarded a citation from the King of Britain.

After her release from the army, Stern returned to Palestine and started work as a graphic designer of maps at the Survey of Palestine, which later became the Measuring Department. One of her innovations was illustrating the drawing of the maps of Palestine. Such a collection of maps was published in 1953 under the title Israel in 14 Pictorial Maps. In 1946, Stern began publishing cartoons in the journal Bamahane. It was then that she designed her signature composed of her first name: Friedel and a star, symbolizing "Stern", her German surname. This signature was meant to differentiate her from Yossi Stern, who was the graphics editor of the journal. Due to the success of this publication, Friedel started to publish her cartoons regularly in the newspapers Davar, Dvar Ha’Shavua and La’isha.

In the 1950s, Stern began publishing journalistic articles where she examined Israeli society critically. For some of these articles, she disguised herself as other ethnicities. In 1956, for instance, she disguised herself as an immigrant from Morocco and was treated with DDT. For other articles, she worked as a bus ticket conductor, and as an immigrant Ulpan student etc. Her articles were always illustrated by cartoons. In 1958 she published her book In Short: Israel about a tourist’s experiences in Israel.

Parallel to her journalistic work, Stern also worked as a graphic designer. In the 1950s and 60s she designed posters for the Philatelist Service and the Israeli Post Office. In 1960 she created the series Air Mail Landscape 2 - a series of 10 stamps of Israel Post (the third series of airmail stamps) about Israel’s cities and sites, thus being the second female stamp designer after Miriam Karoly). Amongst her other works are congratulatory Cards for Independence Day (published by Keren Ha’Yessod in 1958), a poster for the National Insurance Institute (in the 1950s), a collection album Countries and Nations in Pictures (in the early 1960s) and a poster for the Harp Contest (in the 1960s). Her design style was based on a minimalistic geometric line, suitable for those years.

For years, Stern was the only female cartoonist in Israel and, in contrast to her male colleagues, she rarely dealt with political or military subjects. She focused instead on daily life, exposing grotesque or absurd aspects of Israeli society. Her artwork is characterized by a geometric line and relatively little use of color.

From 1962 to 1992, Stern lectured in the sketching department of the Bezalel Academy. For many years she volunteered in the Organization of IDF Invalids and in Beit Ha'Lohem. For this activity, she was awarded the President’s Volunteering Award of 1999. In 2004 she was awarded the Dosh Cartoon Award.

Stern never married. She died in Tel Aviv-Yafo in 2006, shortly before her 90th birthday and was buried at kibbutz Einat.

== Awards and recognition ==
Stern's library was donated to the Beit Ariela Library in Tel Aviv. Her artistic legacy was donated in 2010 to the Israeli Cartoon and Comics Museum in Holon. Since 2012, the Museum has organized a yearly cartoon contest called “The Friedel Stern Humorist Cartoon Contest” in her memory.

== Exhibitions ==
=== Group ===
- A Museum of One's Own (2016), Israeli Cartoon Museum

== Gallery ==
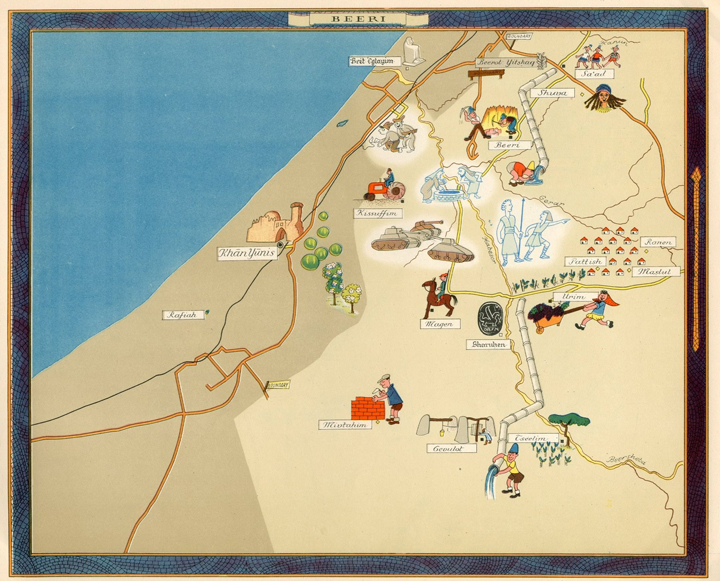
Beeri, From Israel in 14 Pictorial Maps, Kerem Hayesod, 1953

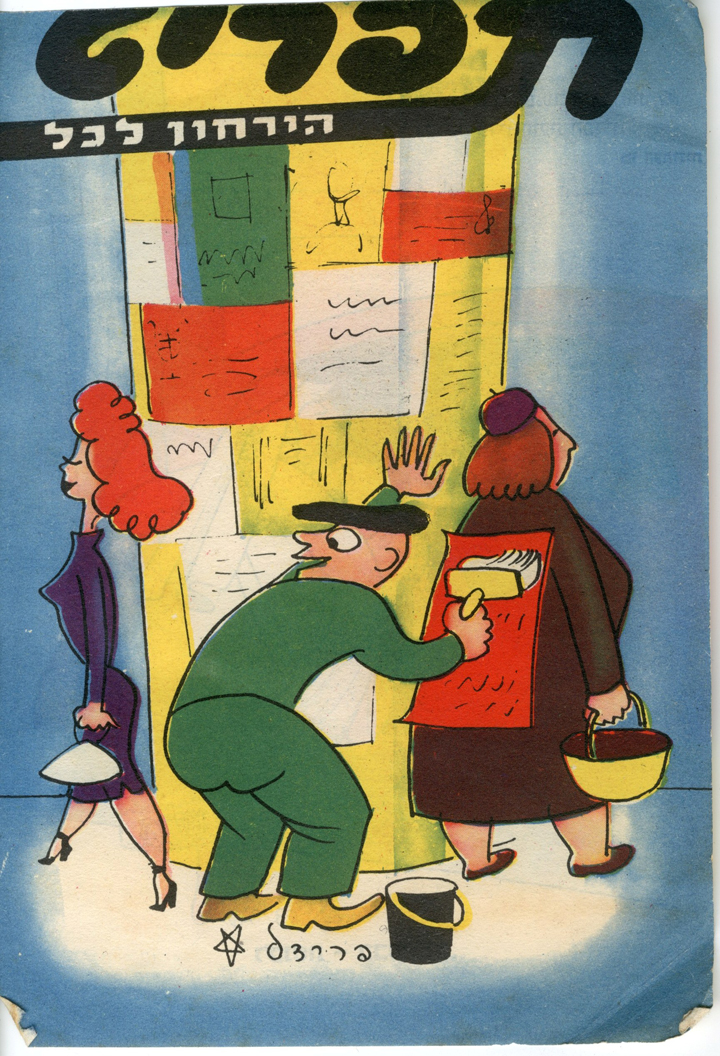
Cover of Tafrit Magazine, 1950

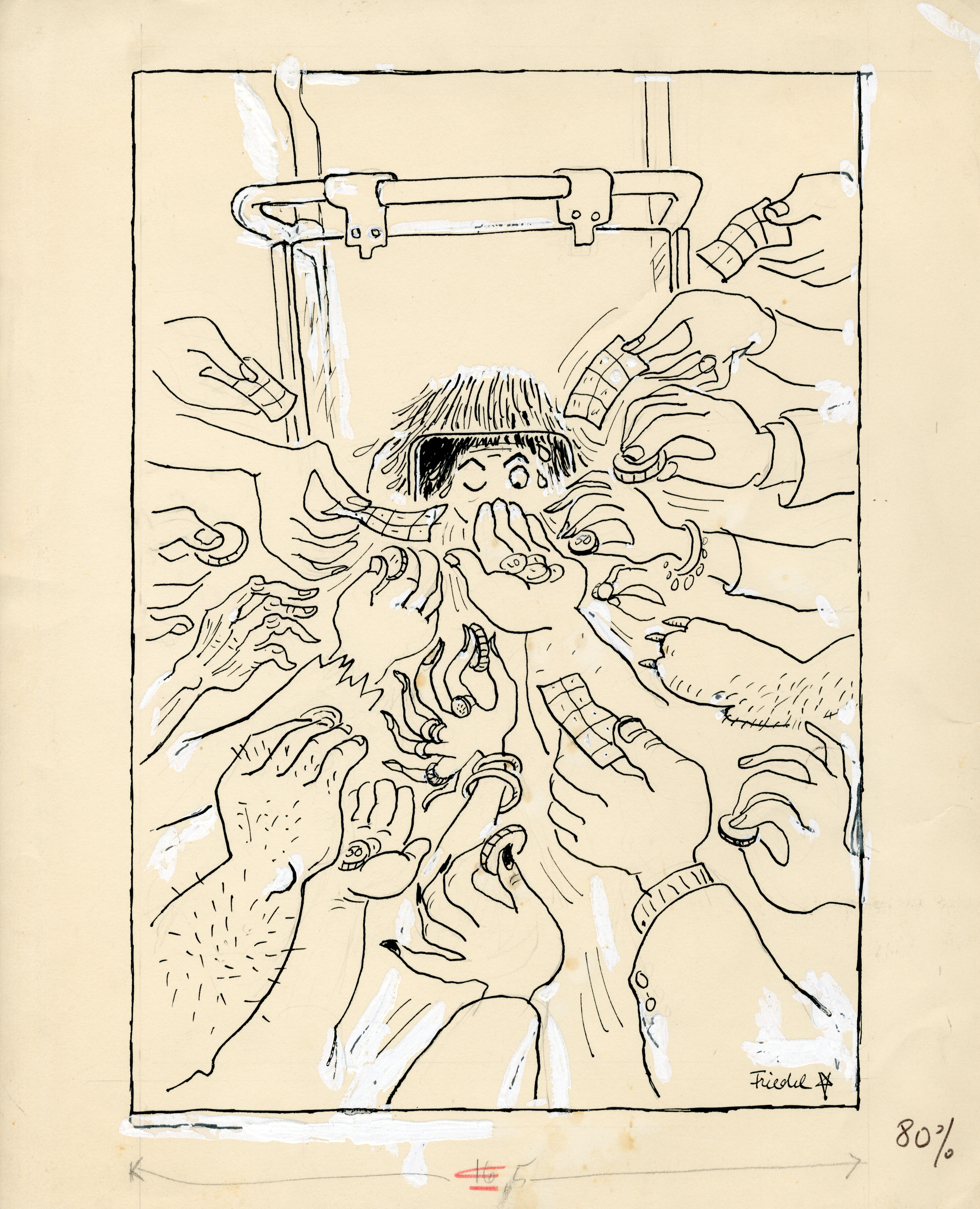
I Was a Bus Conductor, 1956

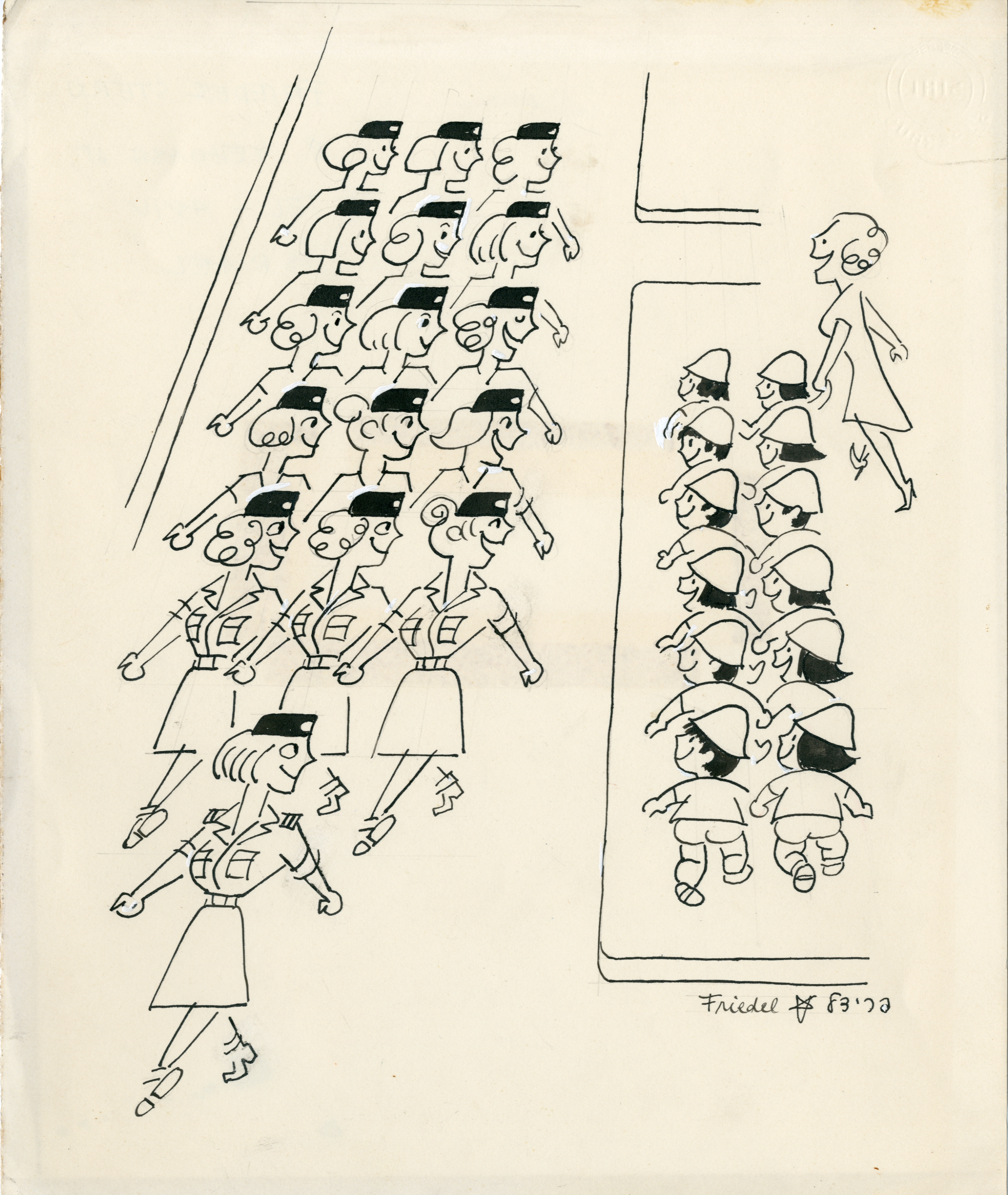
Untitled, c. 1956

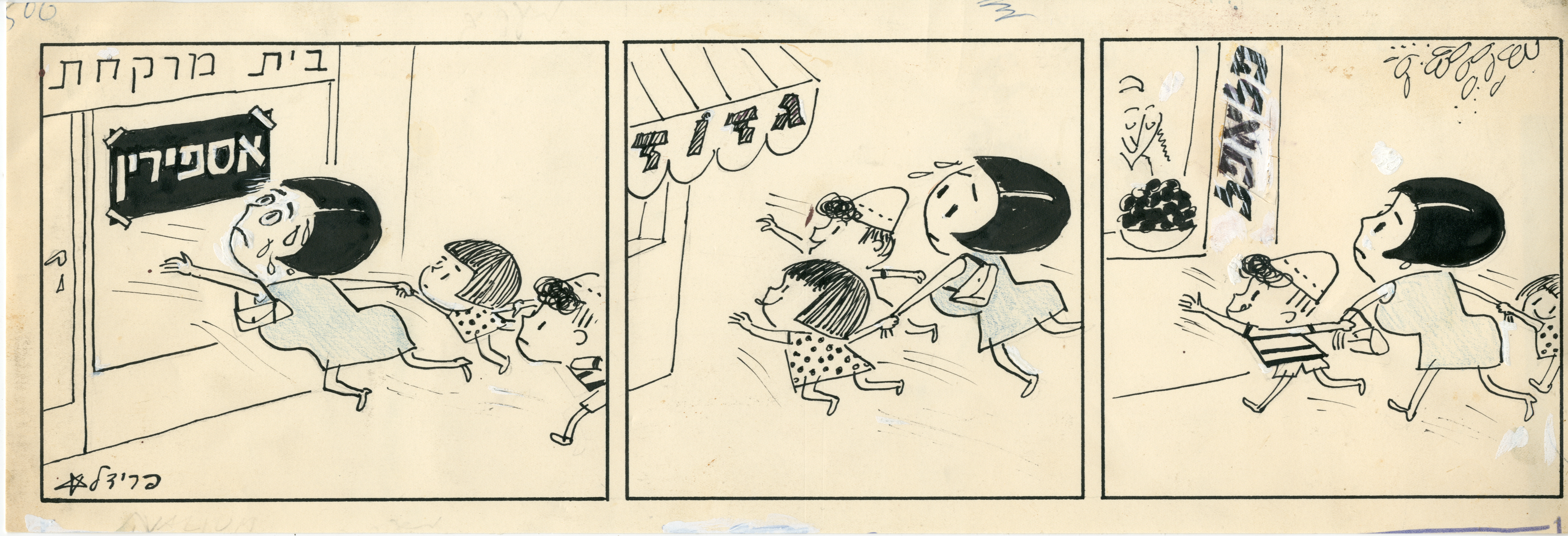
Untitled, From Shus Comic strip, 1965-1970
