= Ed Herring =

British artist (1945–2003)

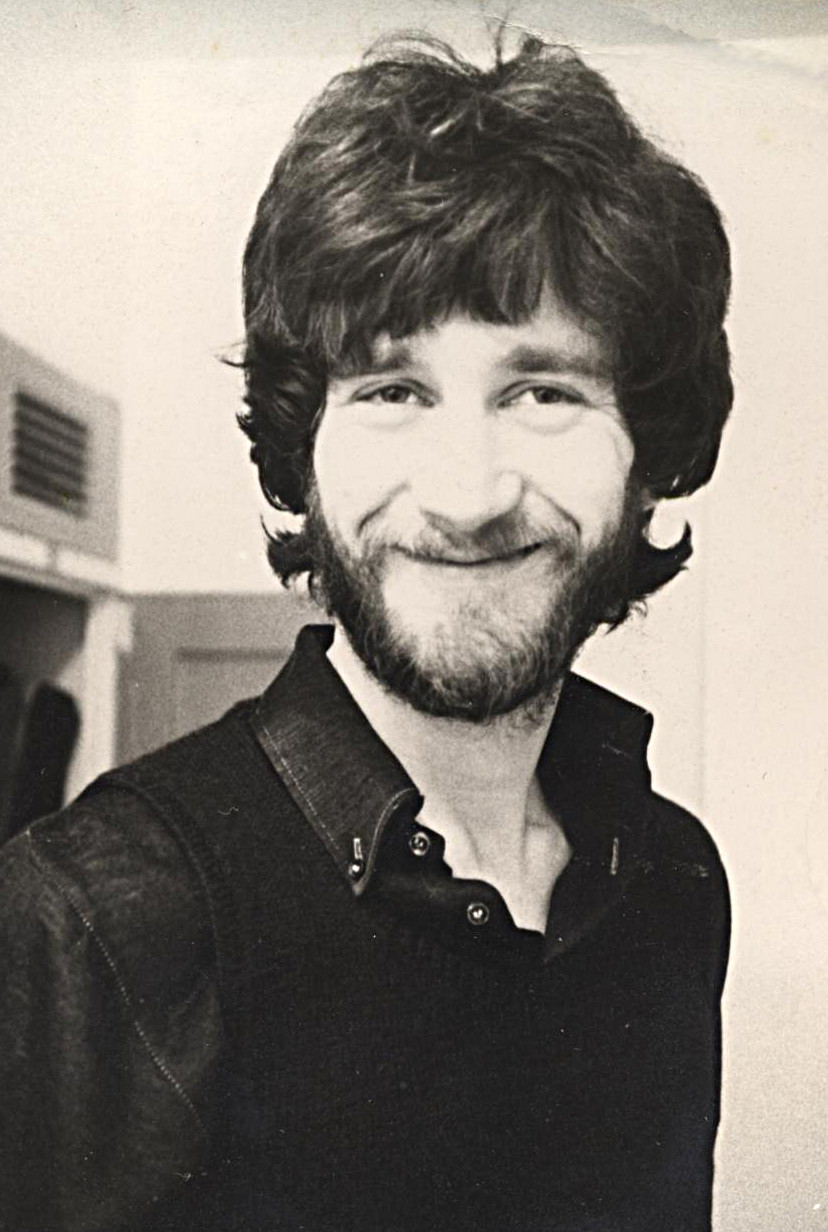
- Born: 26 February 1945; Southport, England
- Died: 23 November 2003 (aged 58); Cahors, Lot, France

Ed Herring (26 February 1945 - 23 November 2003) was a British artist who had an international career in the late 1960s and early 1970s. He is generally considered to be a conceptual artist.

== Early life and education ==
Born on 26 February 1945 in Southport, Lancashire (in northwest England), son of a telephone engineer, he was christened Albert Edward George. He studied art at Harris School for Art, Preston (Foundation course, 1962-1963), Manchester School of Art (Fine Art degree, 1963-1966), Central School of Art in London (post-graduate study in print, 1966–67).

He taught in a number of institutions in Manchester and London. Sonia Boyce, MBE, was amongst his Foundation Course students at East Ham College of Technology (later to become Newham Community College).

== Works: a summary ==
Herring first concentrated on modest-scale installation work in the landscape, that explored the subtle relationship of human intervention with nature. It is this dialogue with the elements that distinguishes Herring from earlier experiments with chance, of the kind done by Dada and Surrealist artists. The intimate scale of the art work also marks Herring from Land Art done in the US. Photography was used to document the work, a method Herring used up until 1970. This date marks a shift away from the seduction of visual imagery towards work based on words, ideas and acts. The artist's interest lay particularly in communication, in coding and decoding. He was close to Keith Arnatt and Terry Atkinson in terms of politics of art as well as friendship. All his work questions the rôle of art and art galleries as well as the relationship of the art work to its audience. Some of his work is now in the Tate Britain Museum, London.

Herring withdrew from the art scene in 1973, removing all his work then held in the Nigel Greenwood Gallery, London. He preferred to work as a teacher, considering this a more honest way of working than being part of the art market "circus". In doing so he disappeared not only from the art scene but from art history. Herring's importance has since been re-affirmed by the Tate Britain's purchase of seven pieces of his work in 2012.

=== 1960s: some key exhibitions ===
Herring exhibited twice at the Camden Art Centre, London, in 1969: Environments Reversal in the summer, and Survey '69. New Space in the autumn. Both were mixed exhibitions.

His main contribution to Environments Reversal was 1,000 Foot Canvas. The work was a primed canvas, 1,000 feet in length, that went from the interior of the Art Centre, out of the main entrance on ground level, down the steps and into the garden. It continued around the garden area before returning to the Art Centre by going up over the roof and passing through the upper part of the main entrance.

New Space was dedicated to four artists: Timothy Drever, Ed Herring, Peter Joseph and David Parsons. Herring made another installation in the garden. At the time of the catalogue going to print the work was called Proposal for Work in a Public Open Space, which Herring later called Chemical Boxes. It comprised 20 specially prepared boxes, metal-lined and filled with different water-sensitive chemicals. They were arranged in rows, before being buried. The boxes in each row were connected with each other by small pipes. At the top end of each row was an area for collecting rain water, which was fed it into the boxes. The aim was to let rain water infiltrate the boxes and create a chemical reaction. The finished result, being buried underneath the lawn, was invisible to the public. Hence a follow-up exhibition, called Sequel, took place at Swiss Cottage Library, London in 1970. Herring exhibited the chemical reactions in the original boxes, once unearthed, revealing a striking range of colours and patterns. It was the actual process that was important and not the finished results.

Herring also exhibited inside the Camden Art Centre during New Space. This consisted of his photographic documentation of work done in isolated parts of the English countryside :

- Lancashire Site Project (various sites in Lancashire, winter 1968/69);
- Chemical-packed cuts (slag heap near Wigan, Lancashire, August/September 1969);
- Tea Bag Piece (Belmont, Lancashire, 1968-9);
- Oiled Earth (near Woodhead, Yorkshire, September 1969);
- Zinc-plated Wood (Belmont, Lancashire, 1969);
- Tie-Up (various locations, Essex, autumn 1969);
- Float (Todmorden, Yorkshire, April 1969);
- Steel Line (1969);
- Grass Re-organisation (1968);
- White Bar (1967/8).

The pieces marked by an asterisk were acquired by the Tate Britain in 2012.

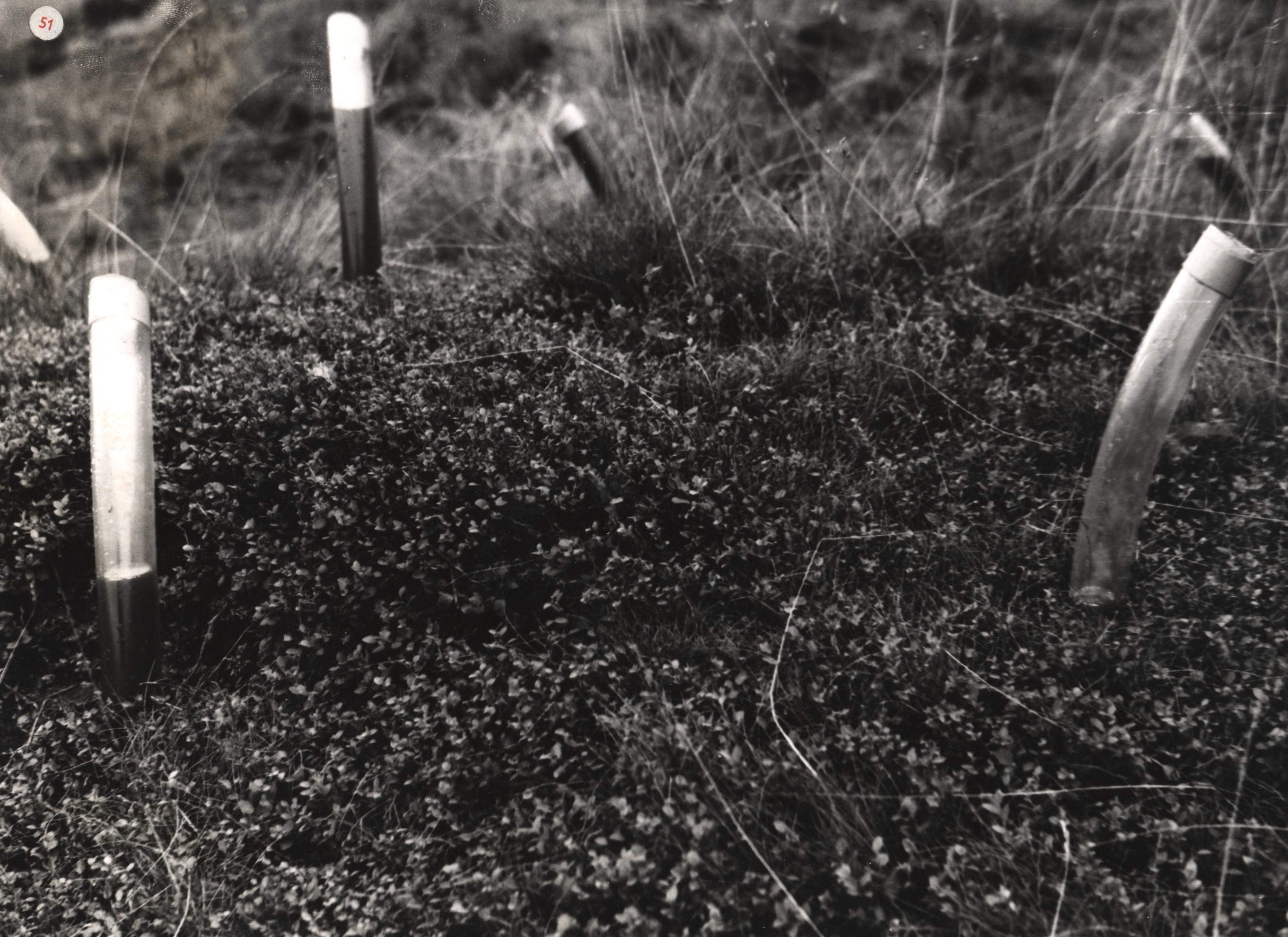
Oiled Earth. Yorkshire (1969). Installation in landscape; mixed media.

The relationship of culture to nature, of pollution to environment is present in Chemical-packed cuts and Oiled Earth, as indeed it is in Chemical Boxes. Oiled Earth is described by Herring as follows: "35 units 1 inch polythene piping. Units deployed in an area of moorland and inserted to a minimum depth of three feet. Each unit filled with oil to a marked level 1 inch from the top. Oil allowed to find its own level according to the absorbency of the surrounding ground". (The artist's own words attached to the printed vintage photograph, now in the Tate Britain collection.)

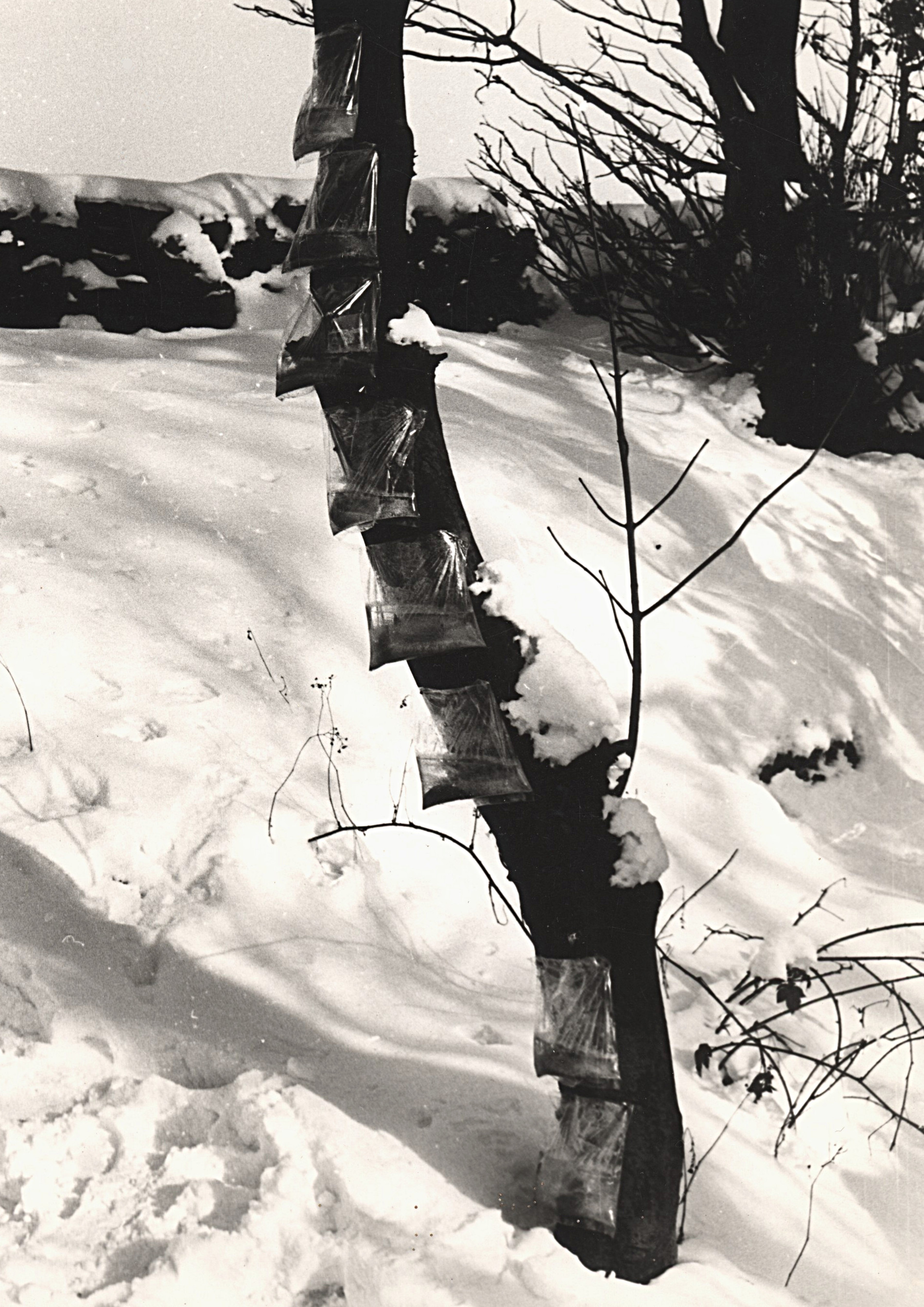
Tea Bag Piece. Belmont, Lancashire (1968-9). Installation in the landscape; mixed media

The Tea Bag Piece is a "series of 12, 8-inch by 12-inch polythene bags nailed to a tree. Each bag containing one tea bag and a measured quantity of (local) stream water. The bags were subject to progressive colour change, condensation, evaporation and extremes of temperature. The piece was photographed after construction and throughout the winter (1968-69)." (The artist's own words attached to the printed vintage photograph, now in the Tate Britain collection.)

=== 1970s ===
Two sound-based works were produced in 1971: one for the giant mixed exhibition called Art Spectrum London at Alexandra Palace, London, that featured John Lennon and Yoko Ono amongst many others; another for the Edinburgh International Festival.

Herring's subsequent works concentrate on encodings, decodings and meta-language, but the elements of chance and process are still present. In 1970 Herring exhibited in Idea Structures with Keith Arnatt, Terry Atkinson, David Bainbridge, Victor Burgin, Harold Hurrell and Joseph Kosuth at the Camden Arts Centre. His work, Proposition, consisted of a small filing cabinet measuring 16 x 20 x 39 cm (a single drawer of card files). Inside were some 400 cards, most of which were blank. During the weeks prior to the exhibition Herring had asked 50 people to keep one card in their possession for a week, at the end of which the used card was collected by the artist. A new card was then given to each person, replacing the used one. The process was repeated seven times, thus yielding a total of 400 cards, minus a number of cards that were accidentally lost. The artist then selected 8 of the used cards, one card from each week's collection, and had the centre of the card micro-graphed (a photographic process that records the microscopic detail of the subject, in this case the actual fibres of the paper card). The micro-graphs were then inserted at regular intervals in the body of 400 blank cards.

In 1971 Herring was invited by Alfred Pacquement, curator of the 7th Paris Biennale, to contribute as a guest artist. Herring produced Lacunosis, which he later exhibited in the Museum of Modern Art, Oxford in 1973. The work consisted of 100 typed sheets, pasted directly onto the wall of the gallery. It contains its own code and, in order the unpack this code, the spectator has to move back and forth in front of the work.

Aspects of Lacunosis were developed further in a more complex work called "D.A.R.N", which stands for Derivative Analytical Reflexive Notations. It was influenced by Wittgenstein's writings and Herring's reading on the Logic of Preference. This work was in the mixed exhibition, A Survey of the Avant-Garde in Britain (part 2), in 1972 in at Gallery House, London and at the Museum of Modern Art, Oxford, with Lacunosis. The London show, A Survey of the Avant-Garde in Britain, included Ian Breakwell, Victor Burgin, Anthony McCall and John Stezaker. The work consists of 57 panels and, like Lacunosis, contains the key to unpacking the work.

=== 1973 onwards ===
Herring's break with the formal art world allowed him to devote more time to writing, which had always been important to him. He produced a collection of poems, as yet unpublished. A small number of pencil drawings were done specially for the auction in support of the miners' strike in 1984. Herring moved to France in 1991 and founded Atelier de la Rose, where he taught short courses in art and photography. His last work in the visual arts was shown in Paris in 1993: Quercy en détail. Les matériaux d'histoire. This is a photo-poem that consists of a series of 50 sepia photographs on 25 panels, with lines of the poem printed into the photographs. Quercy was the region where the artist lived and the work is a homage to the people of this region.

=== Solo exhibitions ===
2016 Ed Herring, Richard Saltoun Gallery, London.

1993 Quercy en détail, Jean Touzot gallery, Paris, France.

1973 Ed Herring - ACTS, Nigel Greenwood Gallery, London.

1970 Sequel, Swiss Cottage Library, London.

=== Group exhibitions ===
2022-3 Hollow Earth. Art, caves & the Subterranean Imaginary. Nottingham Contemporary. A Hayward Gallery touring exhibition.

2016 Conceptual Art in Britain 1964-1979, Tate Britain, London.

1973 Le Witt, Huebler, Herring, Museum of Modern Art, Oxford.

1972 Survey of the British Avant-Garde, Gallery House, London & Goethe Institute, Berlin.

1971 Septième Biennale de Paris, Paris, France.

1971 Art Spectrum London, Alexandra Palace, London.

1971 Edinburgh International Festival, Edinburgh, Scotland.

1970 Information Show, Museum of Modern Art, New York, USA.

1970 Survey '70: Idea Structures, Camden Arts Centre, London.

1970 Nottingham Festival, Nottingham.

1969 Survey '69: New Space, Camden Arts Centre, London.

1969 Environments Reversal, Camden Arts Centre, London.

1969 Manchester College of Art and Design, Manchester University, Manchester.

1968 Stockport City Art Gallery, Stockport, Cheshire.

1968 The Design Centre, London (prints).

1967 Central School of Art and Design, London (prints).

1967 Print '67, Artists International Association, London.

1966 Northern Young Contemporaries, Manchester.
