= Michael Sgan-Cohen =

Israeli artist, art historian, curator and critic

Michael Sgan-Cohen מיכאל סגן-כהן
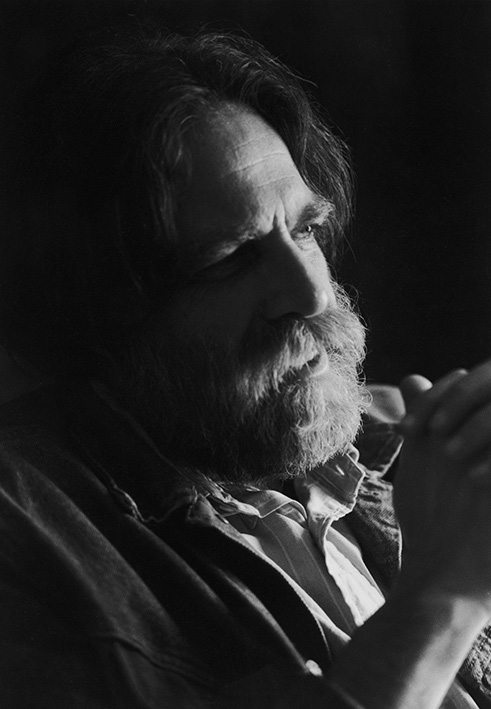
- Born: Michael Sgan-Cohen; 2 March 1944; Jerusalem, Mandatory Palestine
- Died: 20 February 1999 (aged 54); Jerusalem, Israel
- Education: Hebrew University of Jerusalem, University of California, Los Angeles (UCLA), City University of New York (CUNY)
- Known for: Painting, concept
- Notable work: Moses (1977–1978); Hineni (1978); Coat of Many Colors (1981); Leviathan (1983); The Wandering Jew (1983)
- Movement: Israeli art, conceptual art
- Awards: Ministry of Education and Culture Prize, Israel (1998); George and Janet Jaffin Prize for Excellence in Plastic Arts, America-Israel Cultural Foundation (1997); Memorial Foundation for Jewish Culture, New York City (2001–02) (2003–04)

Michael Sgan-Cohen (Hebrew: מיכאל סגן-כהן; 2 March 1944 – 20 February 1999) was an Israeli artist, art historian, curator and critic. His oeuvre touches different realms of the Israeli experience and the Hebrew language, displaying a strong connection to the Jewish Scriptures. His works were nurtured by his extensive knowledge of Art history, philosophy, Biblical Texts, Jewish thought and Mysticism, which in turn illuminated all these pursuits. His engagement with Judaism and the Bible as a secular scholar and his vast knowledge of modern and contemporary art contributed to the development of a distinctive approach which combined Jewish and Israeli symbols and images to create a multilayered and contemporary artistic language.

Sgan-Cohen's art was anticipatory in many respects: his concept of Israeli identity as part of Jewish Identity developed long before other artists began to see things in these terms. This reflected in his profound involvement with the formative Jewish sacred texts, both intellectually and by embedding Jewish thought into the essence of his artistic practice. He was one of the pioneers in the sophisticated use of the Hebrew language as a means of expression in contemporary art.

== Biography ==
Michael Sgan-Cohen was born in Jerusalem, Mandatory Palestine in 1944. His father, Dr. Meir Sgan-Cohen, was a well-known figure in Jerusalem and president Yitzhak Ben-Zvi's personal physician. Sgan-Cohen graduated in Art History and Philosophy from the Hebrew University of Jerusalem in 1969. In the late sixties, while still a student, Sgan-Cohen began writing short articles on art for the literary and cultural supplement of the daily newspaper Haaretz (edited by Benjamin Tammuz).

Between 1969 and 1978 Sgan-Cohen lived in Los Angeles and New York. In 1973 he earned his MA degree in art history from the University of California (UCLA) in Los Angeles. Sgan-Cohen moved to New York in late 1973 to study with the art historian and critic Leo Steinberg. During this period, he was associated with the "New York Group" of Israeli artists including Pinchas Cohen-Gan, Benny Efrat, Michael Gitlin and Buky Swchartz. In 1976 he began to work as an artist. In 1978 Sgan-Cohen had his first solo exhibition at the Kibbutz Gallery in Tel Aviv. During his years in New York, Sgan-Cohen taught art history at the Brooklyn College and at the School of Visual Arts. He wrote for a number of art journals, such as Art in America, Art Forum and Art press, as well as for Hebrew journals like Mussag, Proza, Kav, Studio and Monitin. He wrote the catalogue articles for Motti Mizrahi (1988) and Ya'akov Dorchin (1990) for The Venice Biennale curated by Adam Baruch. In 1989 Sgan-Cohen earned his PhD from the City University of New York (CUNY). His dissertation dealt with the artist and architect Frederick Kiessler, who designed the Shrine of the Book in the Israel Museum.

Between 1977 and 1978 Sgan-Cohen returned to Israel and taught at Bezalel Academy of Arts and Design in Jerusalem as well as at the University of Haifa. In 1987 he permanently settled in Jerusalem and since 1990 served as a lecturer in several Art Institutes in Israel including Oranim Academic College in Kiryat Tivon (1990–98), Kalisher Art Academy in Tel Aviv (1990–98), The School of Visual Theatre in Jerusalem (1991–94) and Bezalel Academy of Arts and Design in Jerusalem (1992–98).

In 1993 Sgan-Cohen had a solo exhibition at the library of foyer of the Tel Aviv Museum of Art. In 1994 he had an extensive solo exhibition at the Ramat Gan Museum of Israeli Art. The following years he had two joint exhibitions—in 1995 with Haim Maor at the Museum of Jewish Art in Bar'am and in 1996 with Tsibi Geva at Julie M. Gallery in Tel Aviv.

Michael Sgan-Cohen curated two major retrospective exhibitions of the painter Lea Nickel (1995) and the sculptor Yehiel Shemi (1997) at the Tel Aviv Museum of Art.

In 1997 Sgan-Cohen was the recipient of the America-Israel Cultural Foundation Prize for Excellence in Plastic Arts and in 1998 he won the Minister of Education and Culture Prize.

He died of an illness in 1999.

During his life and posthumously, Sgan-Cohen's works were shown in Israel, Europe and the U.S. Between 2004 and 2005 an extensive retrospective of his work was held at the Israel Museum in Jerusalem.

In August 2014 a street was named after Michael Sgan-Cohen and his father in The German Colony neighborhood in Jerusalem.

== Art career ==
Life in America sharpened Sgan-Cohen's preoccupation with Hebrew language, Jewish thought (particularly the Bible) and Mysticism and gradually led him from the theoretical articulation of ideas to visual expression. Michael Sgan-Cohen was primarily concerned with ideas. His approach to the visual arts may, accordingly, be considered "conceptual", but not in the standard art-historical kind of sense. The art object was for him a medium of reflection on the fundamental problems of Jewish identity, particularly of the emerging Israeli culture. Sgan-Cohen's long stay in New York City served to sharpen his awareness of the uniqueness of the Israeli perspective in the role of Jewish culture in the life of modern Jews. His recurrent treatment of the theme of Nevo, the observation of the Land of Israel from the outside in the position of Moses before he died, attests for this deep concern, and to his attempt to form an Israeli style in the art without becoming provincial or parochial and without falling into the trap of nostalgia.

Michael Sgan-Cohen's art paid special attention to the word and especially the Hebrew word. He recognized the text as a fundamental medium and subject in Jewish culture. Sgan-Cohen was one of the pioneers in the use of the Hebrew language in contemporary visual art. Hebrew served in his view as the bridge between Jewish heritage, particularly the Bible, and the search for Israeli cultural identity. His works are replete with culturally charged Hebrew phrases and the Hebrew alphabet. The drawn or painted Hebrew word served him as the way in which a generally non-visual, verbal tradition can be approached in the visual medium. The Hinneni (1978) theme is just one example of this, the word becoming a powerful effect on the eye. In other paintings, he portrayed the body in its basic "alphabetic" gestures, placed his self-portrait in a text, copied whole chapters from the bible and made writing itself into a painted image. In those actions, Sgan-Cohen's developed a unique poetic and artistic view of the visual aspects of the Hebrew word and the Hebrew alphabet. Naturally, the Bible became a major source in his art: Moses, The Akedah, Jonah and the Leviathan, Psalms, etc. In a very ambitious and project, Sgan-Cohen made twelve large panels in which the whole text of the Twelve Minor Prophets (Trei Assar) were copied, a homage to the long tradition of the meticulous reproduction of the word of the prophet and at token of respect to the sanctity of the word. In his works, he thus brought together in a highly original way the sensibilities of the critical, self-reflexive post-modern artist who understands the late and the repetitive with those of a modernist one who appreciated the archaic and the primary.

Michael Sgan-Cohen's work shifts between painting and icon, reality and myth, nostalgia and critical distance. His conceptual images capture and invigorate a whole cultural alphabet, combining iconic qualities with simplicity, depth and humour. An image of Israel's map, for example, combines the political, mythical, visual and textual languages and thereby figures the intricate and tension-ridden Israeli place as both a direct experience and an emblem branded in Zionists and Israeli minds. In another work Sgan-Cohen portrayed himself as a Kabbalist who holds in his hand the tree of spheres assembled from parts of a child's old wooden toy. Rather than dissolving into mystical trance, he foregrounds the language game and play of the artistic-cultural act.

== Gallery ==
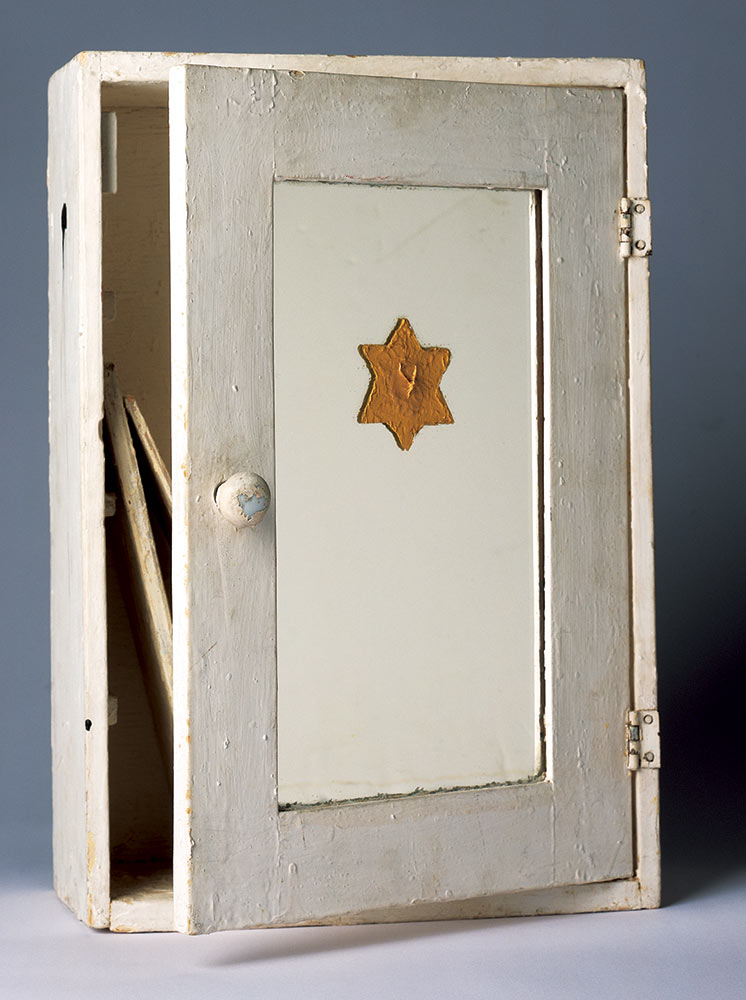
The Ark of the Covenant, 1977, Acrylic on medicine cabinet

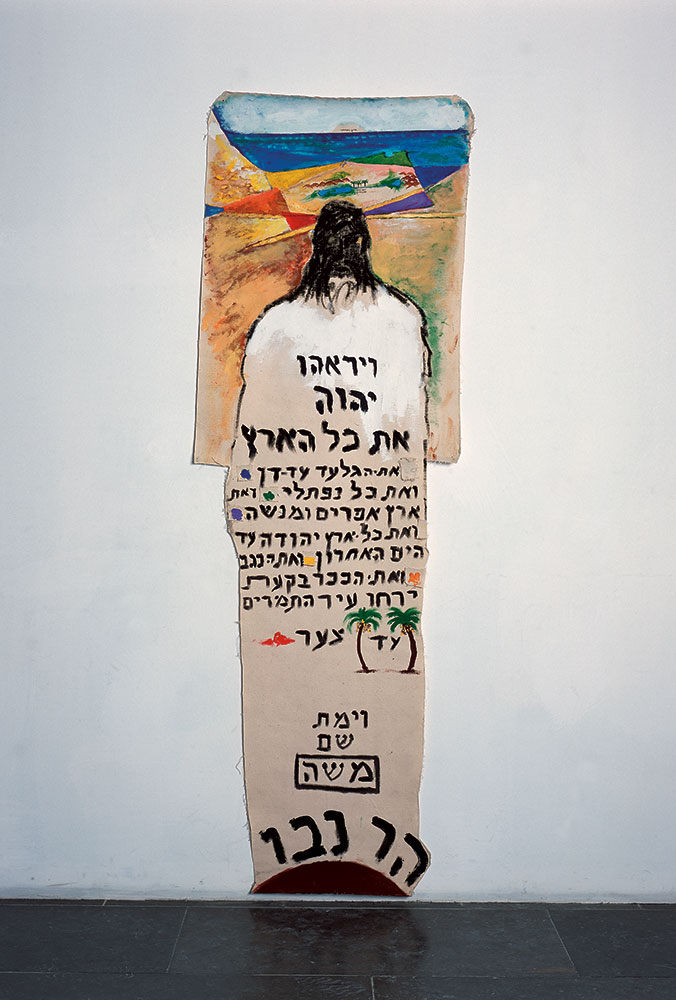
Moses, 1977–1978, Acrylic and oil sticks on canvas, Israel Museum Collection

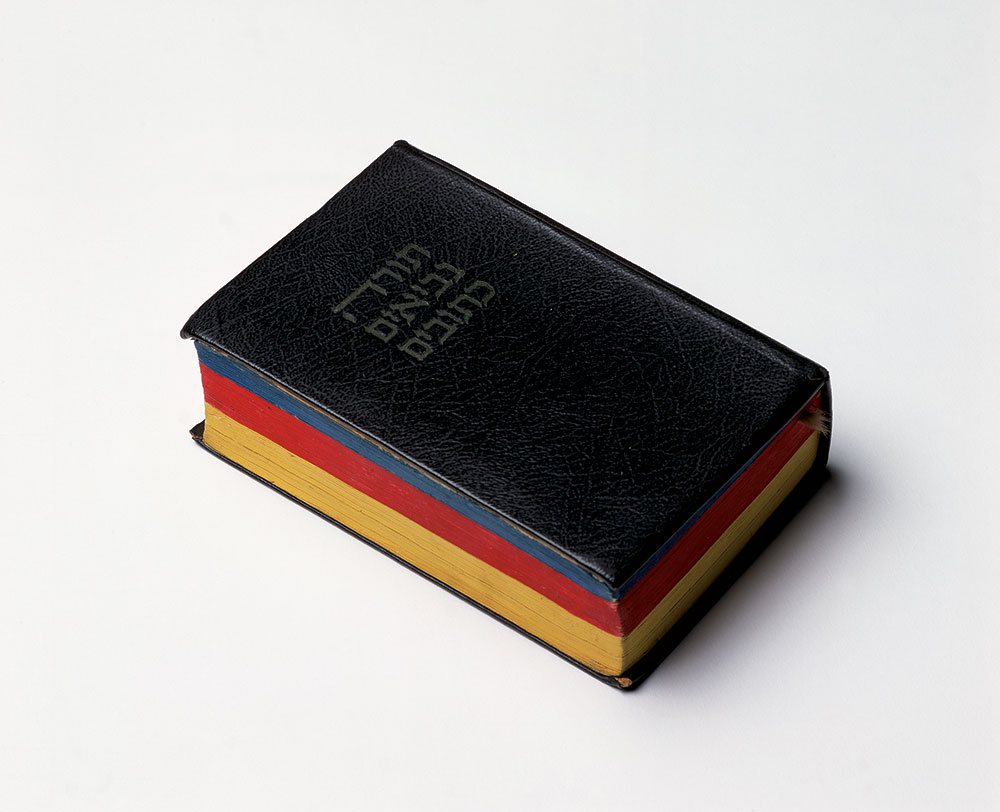
Torah Prophets Writings (The Hebrew Bible), 1978

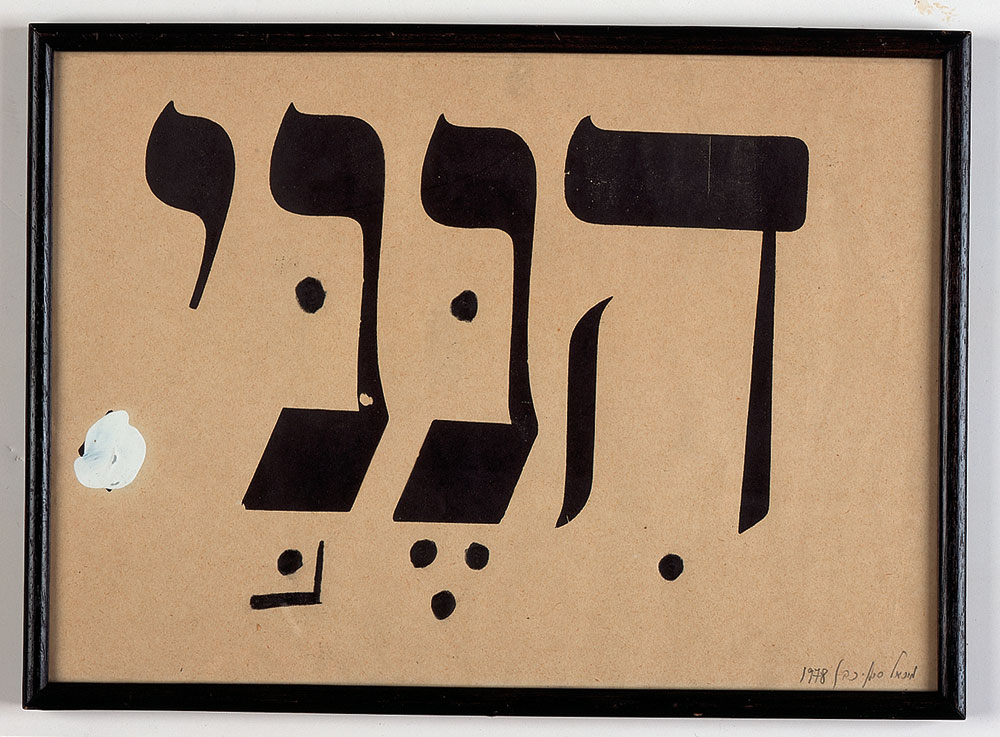
Hinnenni, 1978, Print and acrylic on paper and frame

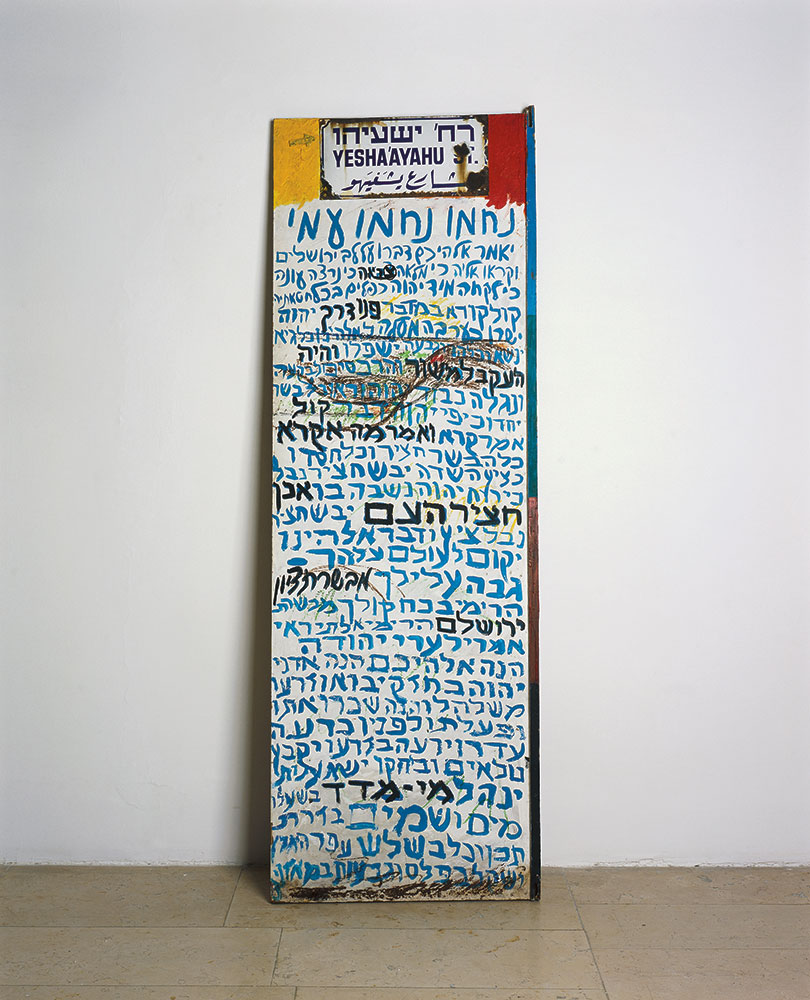
Comfort Ye, Comfort Ye, My People, 1978, Acrylic and oil sticks on wood and street sign

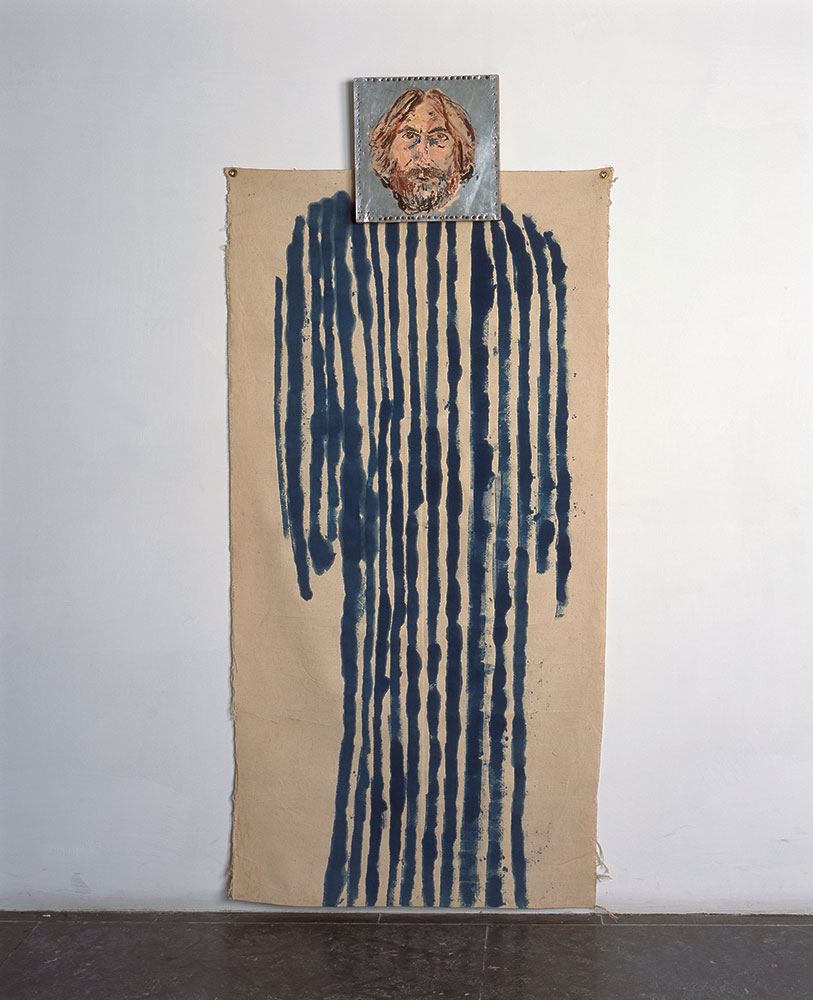
Coat of Many Colors, 1981, Acrylic on canvas, Israel Museum Collection

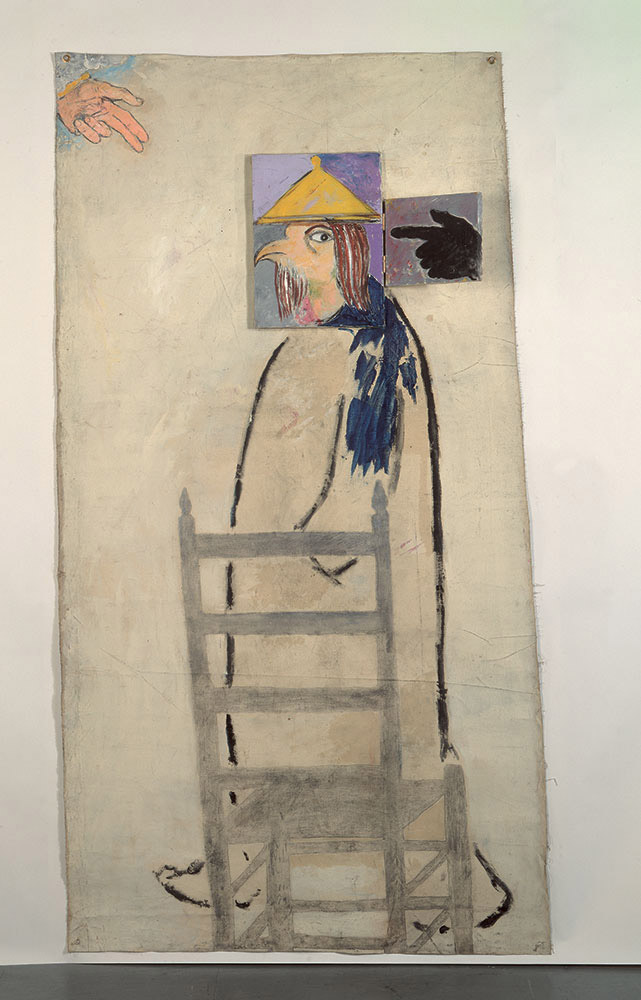
The Wandering Jew, 1983, Acrylic and pencil on canvas

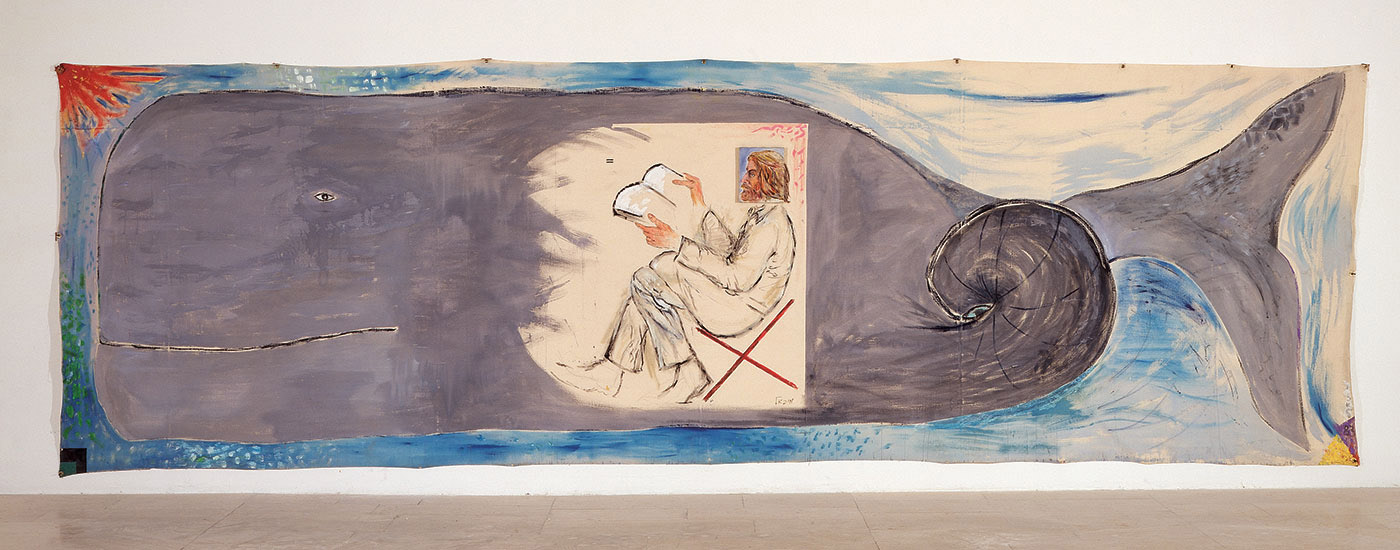
Leviathan, 1983, Acrylic on canvas, Israel Museum Collection

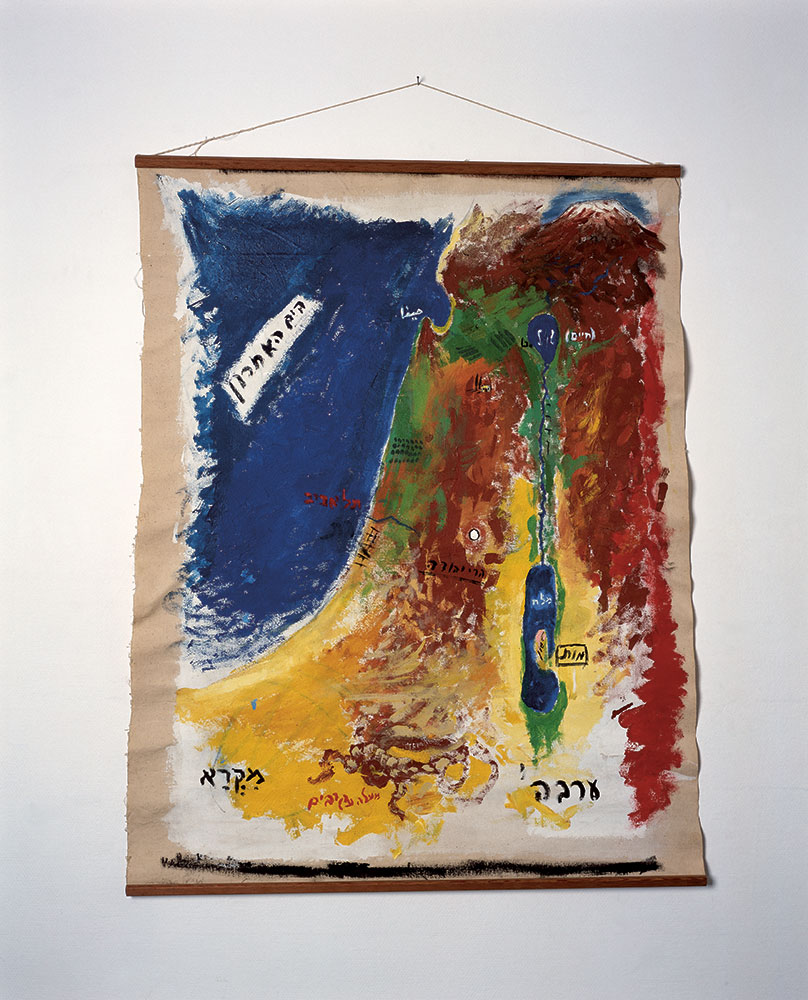
Symbolic Map, 1983, Acrylic on canvas

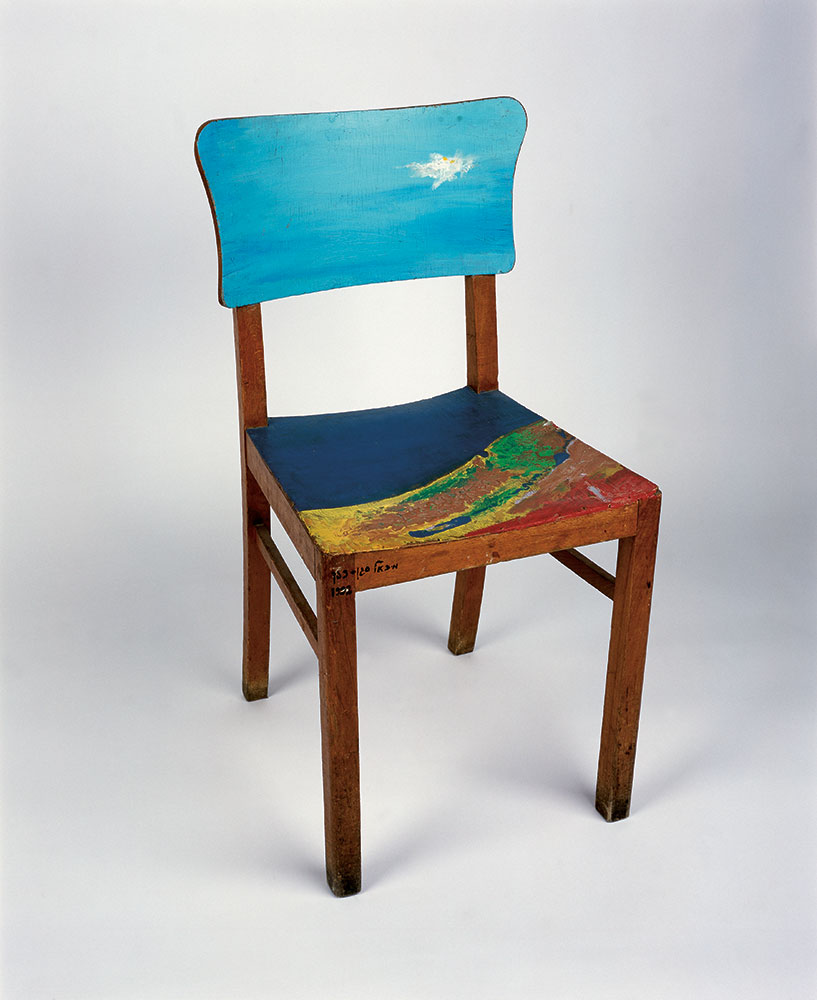
Sitting/Settlement, 1992, Acrylic on wood

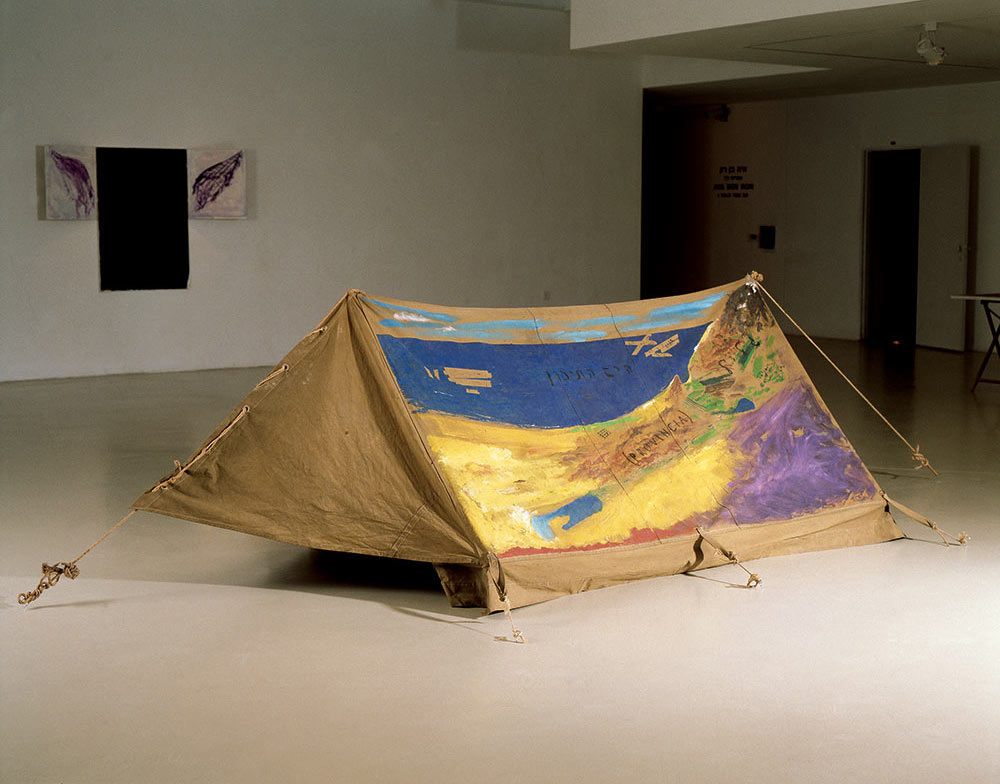
Judea Galilee, 1994, Acrylic and army rangers' tent

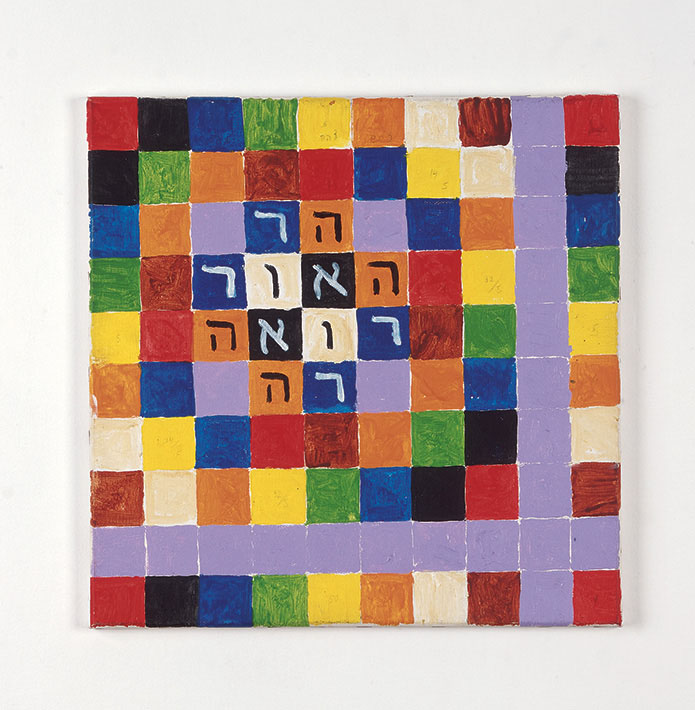
Haor Roeh (The Light Sees), 1998, Acrylic on canvas

== Education ==
- 1965–1969 BA History of Art and Philosophy, The Hebrew University of Jerusalem
- 1969–1973 MA History of Art, University of California, Los Angeles, US
- 1989 PhD City University of New York City, New York City, US

== Teaching ==
- 1973–1978 – Brooklyn College, New York City
- 1977–1978 – Bezalel Academy of Arts and Design, Jerusalem
- 1977–1978 – University of Haifa, Haifa
- 1979 – School of Visual Arts, New York City
- 1990–1998 – Art Institute – Oranim Academic College, Kiryat Tivon
- 1990–1998 – Bezalel Academy of Arts and Design, Jerusalem
- 1990–1998 – Kalisher Art Academy, Tel Aviv-Yafo

== Solo exhibitions ==
- 1978 Hakibbutz Gallery, Tel Aviv
- 1993 Library Foyar, Tel Aviv Museum of Art
- 1994 "Michael Sgan-Cohen, Paintings, 1978 – to date", Museum of Israeli Art, Ramat-Gan
- 2004 "Michael Sgan-Cohen, a Retrospective", The Israel Museum, Jerusalem

== Two-artist exhibitions ==
- 1995 "Twice over", Haim Maor and Michael Sgan-Cohen, Bar-David Museum, Bar-Am
- 1996 "Painting a Land", Tzibi Geva and Michael Sgan-Cohen, Julie M. Gallery, Tel Aviv
- 2008 Idan Erez / Michael Sgan-Cohen, Hamidrasha Gallery, Tel Aviv

== Group exhibitions ==
- 1981 "Ulam 1", Artists House, Jerusalem
- 1982 Dvir Gallery, Tel Aviv
- 1982 "Black and White", Public image, New York
- 1983 Dvir Gallery, Tel Aviv
- 1983 "Events '83, "Metaphysics", Artist House, Jerusalem
- 1984 "Art and Ego", Pan-Art, New York
- 1985 "Towards Myth Without God", Artists House, Jerusalem
- 1985 "In the Open", National Park, Ramat-Gan, Ramat-Gan
- 1987 "Israeli Art", The Israel Museum, Jerusalem
- 1987 "Vistas-Landscape". Einstein Gallery, New York
- 1987 "Second Coming", Dramatis Personae, New York
- 1987 "Drawings", The Eika Gallery, Jerusalem
- 1988 "Critics Choice". Artifact Gallery, Tel Aviv
- 1990 "New Acquisitions", The Israel Museum, Jerusalem
- 1991 "Routes of Wandering", The Israel Museum, Jerusalem
- 1991 "Grids", Kalisher Five Art Gallery, Tel Aviv
- 1991 "Drawing Now, Drawing Here", Kalisher five Art Gallery, Tel Aviv
- 1992 "Two Dimensions, One Dimension", Israel Festival, Jerusalem
- 1993 "Sham", The Israel Museum, Tel Aviv
- 1993 "Artists Books", Kalisher Five Gallery, Tel Aviv
- 1993 "International match box Art Exhibition", The Art Workshop Gallery, Yavneh
- 1994 "Tel-Hai", Tel-Hai
- 1994 "Flags", Omanut La'am
- 1994 "Separate Worlds", Tel Aviv Museum of Art
- 1994 "Anxiety", Ramat-Gan Museum of Israeli Art, Ramat-Gan
- 1994 "Identity, artist, Place", Artists House, Jerusalem
- 1995 "Critic's Choice", Artists House, Tel Aviv
- 1995 "My heart is in the East", Center for Contemporary Art, Haifa
- 1995 "Blue White", Bineth Gallery, Tel Aviv
- 1995 "A Place of Shelter", Municipal Art Gallery, Jerusalem
- 1996 "Windows", The Israel Museum, Jerusalem
- 1996 "Ketav-Flesh and Word in Israeli Art", Ackland Art Museum, University of North Carolina at Chapel Hill
- 1997 "Art and Fate", The New Workshop, Ramat-Eliahu
- 1998 "Where Have We Come From and Where Do We Go"? Yad Labanim Museum of Art, Petach Tikva
- 1998 "Flag-Nationality-Flag", Pyramid Center for Contemporary Art, Haifa
- 1998 "Perspectives on Israeli Art on the Seventies", Tel Aviv Museum of Art
- 1998 "Kol Anot", Israeli Art and the Bible", Artists House, Tel Aviv
- 1998 "To the Tomb of the Righteous", The Israel Museum, Jerusalem
- 1998 "To the East- Orientalism in the Arts in Israel", The Israel Museum, Jerusalem
- 1998 "Private Icons", Pyramid, Center for Contemporary Art, Haifa
- 1998 "Artists on the Peace Way", Givatayim Theatre, Givatayim
- 1998 "Private Icons", Library & Memorial Center, Kriyat Tivon
- 1998 "Stains", The Israel Museum, Jerusalem
- 1998 "Ministry od Education and Culture Prize for Artists, in the fields of Plastic Art 1997/1998
- 1998 "Good Kids, Bad Kids', Children in Israeli Art, The Israel Museum, Jerusalem
- 1998 "In the Name of the Land. In the Name of the Lord", The Artists House, Jerusalem
- 1999 "Summer Harvest", The Israel Museum, Jerusalem
- 2000 "Art and Artists from Israel and Palestina", Palazzo delle Papesse, Siena, Centro Arte Contemporanea
- 2001 "Love at first sight", The Israel Museum, Jerusalem
- 2001 "Israeli Habitat", The Dwek Gallery, Jerusalem
- 2001 "Le Juif Errant, Un Temoin Du Temps, Musee d'art et d'histoire du Judaiisme
- 2001–02 "Hands", The Israel Museum, Jerusalem
- 2002 "Acquisitions from the Uzi Zucker Foundation for Contemporary Israeli Art", Tel Aviv Museum of Art
- 2002 "Running Words", On the writing of Prints, Jerusalem Print Workshop
- 2003 "Present Tense 2", The Israel Museum, Jerusalem
- 2003 "Self Portrait", Gordon Gallery, Tel- Aviv
- 2003 "The Right of the image – Jewish Perspectives in Modern Art, Museum Buchom, Germany
- 2004 "Dead end", Gordon Gallery, Tel-Aviv
- 2005 "Handwriting", a group exhibition, Gordon Gallery, Tel-Aviv
- 2006 "The Devine Image: Depicting God in Jewish and Israeli Art", The Israel Museum, Jerusalem
- 2007 "Visual Israeliness", The Open University of Israel, Raanana
- 2008 "Eventually We'll Die ", The Fifth Decade: Art in Israel, 1988–1998, Herzliya Museum of Contemporary Art, Herzliya
- 2008 "Check Post", The Fourth Decade: Art in Israel, 1978–1988, Haifa Museum of Art, Haifa
- 2008 "My Own Body", The Third Decade: Art in Israel, 1968–1978), Tel-Aviv Museum of Art
- 2008 "Typisch! Klischees von Juden und Andern, Judisches Museum, Berlin, Germany
- 2008 "Mr. Guskin", Art T.L.V. Balcony, Nachalat Binyamin, Tel-Aviv
- 2008–2009 "Hidden Traces – Jewish Diaspora Ostopography of the Avant-Garde", Felix Nussbaum-Haus, Osnabruck, Germany
- 2008–2009 "Van Gogh in Tel Aviv", Rubin Museum, Tel Aviv, Curators: Carmela Rubin, Edna Arda, Shira Naftali
- 2009 "Watermelons", Rubin Museum, Tel Aviv, Curators: Carmela Rubin, Shira Naftali
- 2009 "Last Edition": paper as raw material in contemporary Israeli art, Ben-Gurion University, Beer-Sheva. Curators: Haim Maor and students from the curating studies
- 2009 "Careful, glued!" Collages from the Museum and other collections, the Tel Aviv Museum of Art, Curator: Irit Hadar
- 2009 "Selection of Israeli Art from the Collection of Gaby and Ami Brown", Museum of Art, Ein Harod
- 2009 Typical Clichés of Jews and Others, Jewish Museum, Vienna
- 2011–2014 "The Museum Presents Itself" from the Museum of Israeli Art, Tel Aviv Museum
- 2011 Auf des Spuren Judicher Zeichen, Kultur Bahnhof Eller, Düsseldorf, Germany, Curator: Avraham Eilat
- 2012 "Portraits of Cain": Representations of 'others' in Contemporary Art in Israel', Ben-Gurion University, Beersheba, Curator: Haim Maor
- 2013 "Image of the Word" active exhibition, the Art Institute Oranim, Kriyat Tivon
- 2013 "Now, now" Biennale of Jerusalem, The brothers adherent compound, Jerusalem, Curators: Porat Salomon, Oryan Galster
- 2014 "Revelations" Jerusalem Print Workshop, Jerusalem, Curators: Irena Gordon, Tamar Gispan-Greenberg, Arik Kilemnik
- 2015–2016 "Israeli Art", A New Permanent Exhibition, The Israel Museum, Jerusalem, Curator: Amitai Mendelsohn
- 2016 "Alchemy of Words: Abraham Abulafia, Dada, Lettrism", Tel Aviv Museum of Art, Curator: Batsheva Goldman-Ida
- 2016–2017 "Behold the Man: Jesus in Israeli Art", The Israel Museum, Jerusalem, Curator: Amitai Mendelsohn
- 2017 "No Place Like Home", The Israel Museum, Jerusalem, Curator: Adina Kamien
- 2017 "Thou Shalt Not", Museum on the Seam, Jerusalem, Curator: Raphie Etgar

== Awards and prizes ==
- 1994–1999 Artist-in-residence, The Jerusalem Foundation, Jerusalem
- 1998 Ministry of Education and Culture Prize
- 1997 George and Janet Jaffin Prize for Excellence in Plastic Arts, America-Israel Cultural Foundation
- 2001–02, 2002–03 Memorial Foundation for Jewish Culture, New York City

== Selected art critic and writings ==
- Michael Sgan-Cohen, "The Jewish Experience in Art", Art in America, May–June 1976, pp. 44–47
- Michael Sgan-Cohen, "Kiesler on stage and off", Theatre design, Art in America, summer 1981, pp. 37–39
- Michael Sgan-Cohen, "Motti Mizrahi: A New Song", The Venice Biennale, 1988, The Israeli Pavilion
- Michael Sgan-Cohen, "Frederick Kiesler: Artist, Architect, Visionary, A study on his work and writing", 1989, PhD, CUNY, New York (A short summary that was compiled by Valentina Sonzogni for the Kiesler Foundation research department in order to add information to the status quo of the international research.)
- Michael Sgan-Cohen, "Yaakov Dorchin: East of Eden", Dorchin, The Venice Biennale, 1990, The Israeli Pavilion
- Michael Sgan-Cohen, "Le Sanctuaire du Livre et L'art de transformer le superflu en nécessaire", Collection Monographie Frederick Kiesler sous la direction de Chantai Béret, Edition du Centre Georges Pompidou, 1996, pp. 229–239
- Michael Sgan-Cohen, "Ketav and Hebrew in Israeli Art" Flesh and Word in Israeli Art, Ackland Art Museum, The University of North Carolina at Chapel Hill, (Catalogue) pp. 41–51

== Selected Hebrew writings ==
- "Cain, artist, Wandering Jew", Proza, No. 43, Dec. 1980, pp. 28–30 (Hebrew)
- "Assumptions Concerning the possibility of the Birth of Jewish-Israeli Art", Jerusalem, Vol. 11–12, Bezalel, Feb. 1984, pp. 79–87 (Hebrew)
- "Between New York and Jerusalem" Kav, June 1984, pp. 64–76 (Hebrew)
- "Tzeva" (color), Bezalel No.1, Feb. 1984, pp. 67–73 (Hebrew)
- "A Cautious Touch of Sources", Studio, No. 14, Sept. 1990, p. 32 (Hebrew)
- "Hur and Aharon – An Autointerview on Art, Religion and Israeliness", Studio, No. 17, Dec. 1990 (Hebrew)
- "From the Horse Mouth", Studio, No. 52, April 1994, pp. 15–19 (Hebrew)
