= Michael Gitlin =

South African-born Israeli sculptor

Michael Gitlin מיכאל גיטלין
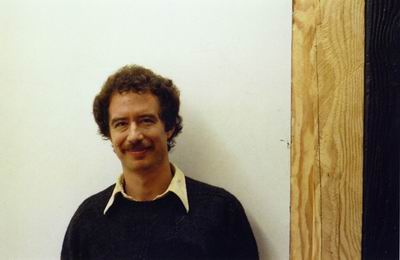
- Gitlin in 1980
- Born: 1943 (age 82–83); Cape Town, South Africa
- Education: Pratt Institute, New York, Bezalel Academy of Art and Design
- Known for: Sculptor
- Movement: Israeli art

Michael Gitlin (Hebrew: מיכאל גיטלין; born 1943 in Cape Town, South Africa) is a contemporary sculptor.

== Life and work ==
Michael Gitlin's family emigrated from South Africa to Israel in 1948. Gitlin received his BA in English Literature and Art History from the Hebrew University of Jerusalem (1967). He simultaneously studied at the Bezalel Academy of Arts and Design in Jerusalem, graduating in 1967. Gitlin moved to New York City in 1970 and received an MFA from Pratt Institute (1972). His first museum show was at the Israel Museum in Jerusalem in 1977. That same year, his work was exhibited at the Documenta in Kassel, Germany. Gitlin was represented by the Schmela Gallery in Düsseldorf and works of his were acquired by such institutions as the Stedelijk Museum Amsterdam and the Gugghenheim Museum. In the 1980s, Gitlin taught sculpture at the Parsons School of Design, Columbia University, the Bezalel Academy of Arts and Design, and the University of California, Davis.

Gitlin's one-person museum shows have included: the Israel Museum, Jerusalem (1977); the ICC Antwerp (1980); Exit Art, New York (1985); Kunstraum Munchen (1986); Bonn Kunstverein (1988); Kunsthalle Mannheim (1989); Carnegie Mellon Art Gallery (1989); Museum van Hedendaagse Kunst Antwerpen (1991). Gitlin is a member of the generation of Post-Minimalist artists working in Manhattan and Europe in the early 1970s that included Gordon Matta-Clark, Benni Efrat, Joel Shapiro, Joshua Neustein, Robert Grosvenor, Nahum Tevet, and Ulrich Rückriem, among others.

Gitlin's work can be characterized as abstract and reductive. He began his career working three-dimensionally, first with paper and later with wood, using paper as a medium rather than a support. His sculptures are mostly wall pieces, which depend on architecture for their physical and contextual support. In a 1996 catalogue for a show at Katrin Rabus Gallery in Bremen, Germany, Barry Schwabsky describes Gitlin's work as "characterized above all by its restlessness [...]. The object in crisis – for Gitlin at least, and perhaps only for him, such is the risk of the artist – implicates the subject of sculpture more than its means. For the sculptor, there is the object and there is the space it inhabits, and these must have a determinate relationship. This relationship is perhaps the true subject of the work."

In recent years, Gitlin has worked with steel wool, copper wire, foam, and black spandex. Drawing too has always been a demanding part of Gitlin's project.

== Education ==
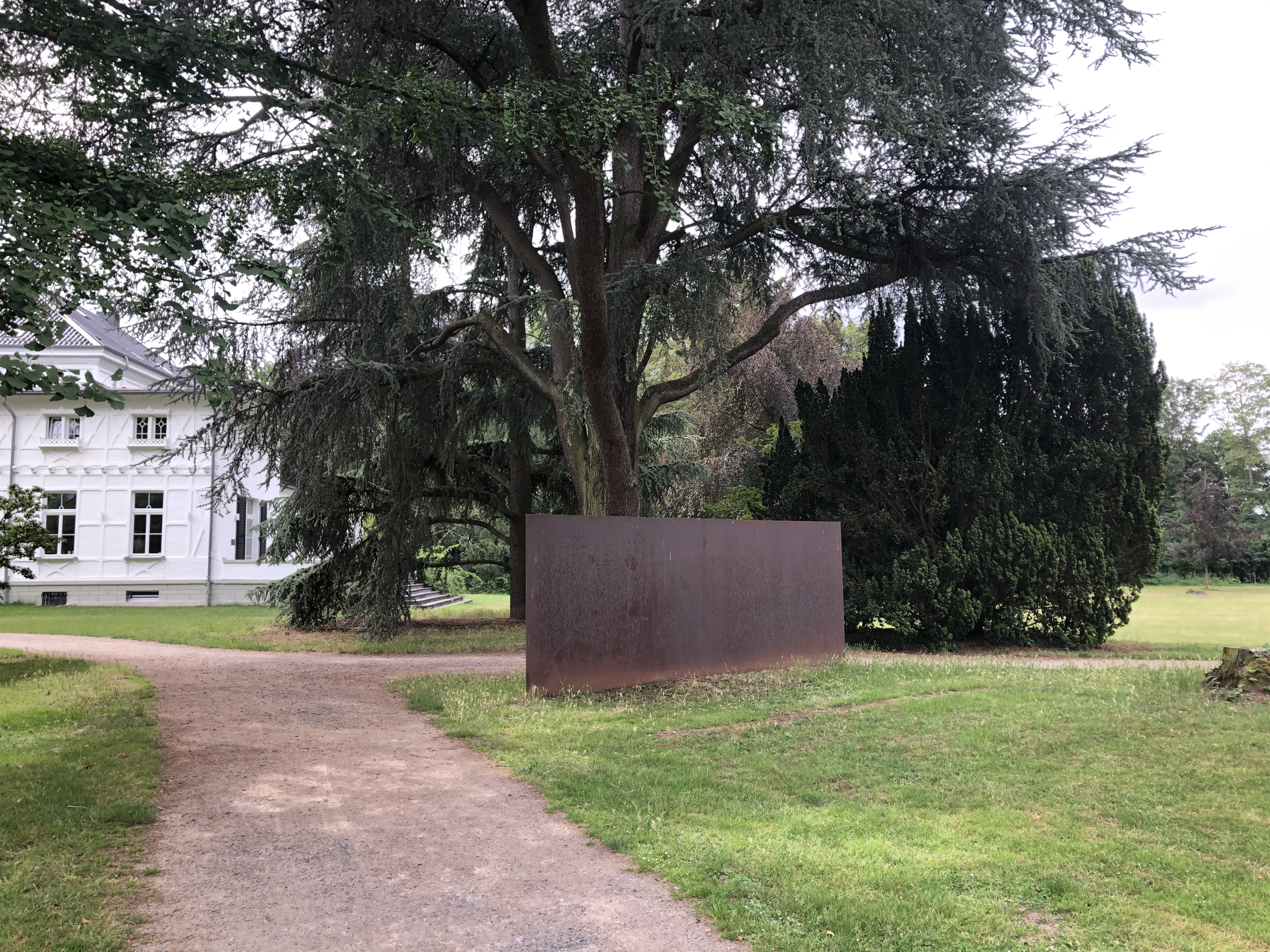
Ohne Titel

- M.F.A, Pratt Institute, New York, 1970–1972
- Hebrew University, Jerusalem, 1964–1967
- Bezalel Academy of Arts and Design Academy, Jerusalem, 1963–1967

== Teaching ==
- Columbia University, 1987
- Bezalel Academy of Arts and Design Academy, Jerusalem, 1977–1978 and 1985
- Parsons School of Design, New York, 1976–1977 and 1981–1984
- New School, New York, 1973–1974
- Pratt Institute, New York, 1971–1972

== Awards and Prizes ==
- 1984 National Endowment for the Arts Fellowship, National Endowment for the Arts, USA
- 1987 Guggenheim Fellowship—Sculpture and Drawing
- 1988 Augustus St. Gaudens Memorial Fellowship
- 1989 Israel Museum Sandberg Prize
- 1991 Pollock-Krasner Foundation Grant
- 2000 George and Janet Jaffin Prize, America Israel Cultural Foundation
- 2005 New York Foundation for the Arts (NYFA) Fellowship

== Selected Museum Collections ==
British Museum, London
Brooklyn Museum, New York
Detroit Institute of Arts, Detroit
Fogg Museum, Harvard University, Cambridge
Solomon R. Guggenheim Museum, New York
Haifa Museum of Modern Art, Haifa, Israel
Hirshhorn Museum and Sculpture Garden, Washington D.C.
Leopold Hoesch Museum, Duren, Germany
Israel Museum, Jerusalem, Israel
Jewish Museum, New York
Kaiser Wilhelm Museum, Krefeld, Germany
Kunstverein Ingolstadt, Ingolstadt, Germany
Museum Ludwig, Cologne, Germany
Kunsthalle Mannheim, Mannheim, Germany
Marl Sculpture Museum, Marl, Germany
MUSMA, Museum of Contemporary Sculpture, Matera, Italy
Neues Museum Weserburg, Bremen, Germany
MOMA Museum of Modern Art, New York/>

New York Public Library, New York
Rijksmuseum, Amsterdam, Netherlands
Kröller-Müller Museum, Otterlo, Netherlands
Städtische Galerie im Lenbachhaus, Munich, Germany
Städtische Galerie, Erlangen, Germany
Stedelijk Museum, Amsterdam, Netherlands
Tel Aviv Museum of Art, Tel Aviv, Israel
Wilhelm-Hack- Museum, Ludwigshafen, Germany
Wilhelm-Lehmbruck-Museum, Duisburg, Germany
