= Gallery House, London =

London art space

Gallery House, London was a nonprofit art space founded in 1972 by Sigi Krauss, which was open for sixteen months until its abrupt closure in 1973. Gallery House hosted exhibitions, residencies, performances, "happenings", and events.

== History ==
Gallery House occupied a vacant mansion owned by the German government, next to the Goethe Institute on Exhibition Road in South Kensington. The inaugural exhibition included works by Stuart Brisley, Gustave Metzger, and Marc Camille Chaimowicz. Having himself been appointed by the German cultural attaché to London, Sigi Krauss brought in as co-director Rosetta Brooks, then an undergraduate student at the University College London, who took an active role in the Gallery's programming. The exhibition format Krauss and Brooks adopted was loose, with no set open hours, no compensation for staff, no entry charge, and no censorship of artists. Within this framework, Gallery House staged exhibitions that gained critical attention, including some of the earliest recorded shows of ‘expanded cinema’, new film, and video work. Among them were Brooks' ambitious, influential three-part Survey of the Avant-Garde in Britain which included British video artist David Hall's first multiscreen installation, and Marc Camille Chaimowicz' career-making Celebration? Realife, in which the artist filled the House's ballroom with party lights, disco detritus, and found objects, invited viewers to discuss the work over coffee in the adjacent gallery, and slept in the building at night for the exhibition's duration.

Documents from Gallery House, including meeting minutes, diaries, correspondence, artifacts and audio-visual resources, are held by the Tate Gallery Archive, along with material from Sigi Krauss Gallery and the later Artists Meeting Place space.

=== Contemporary interest ===
In 2006, the Centre of Attention curatorial collective organized Fast and Loose: My Dead Gallery, an exhibition at Fieldgate Gallery in London that celebrated defunct alternative art exhibition spaces in London, prominently including Gallery House. The exhibition drew attention from leading art journals, appearing on top-ten-of-the-year lists by then-Tate Modern film curator Stuart Comer in Frieze, and by Whitney Museum curator Chrissie Iles in Artforum, who wrote that these spaces "nurtured an alternative practice that has remained largely invisible due to its ephemerality, yet were enormously important for the development of artists".

In 2017, curators Antony Hudek and Alex Sainsbury mounted This Way Out of England: Gallery House in Retrospect at Raven Row, an exhibition in which artists who had shown at Gallery House were invited to reenact or rethink their interventions in the space.

Artists who exhibited at Gallery House included Stuart Brisley, Marc Camille Chaimowicz, British experimental film collective Filmaktion, Avital Geva, Susan Hiller, Menashe Kadishman, Anthony McCall, David Medalla, Gustav Metzger, Robert Morris, Joshua Neustein, Hermann Nitsch, and Carolee Schneeman.
