= Benni Efrat =

Israeli painter, sculptor, printmaker and filmmaker

Benni Efrat بني إفرات
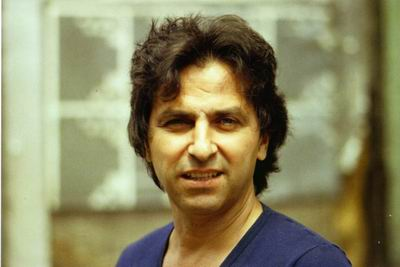
- Benni Efrat
- Born: 1936 (age 89–90); Beirut, Lebanon
- Education: Avni Institute of Art and Design in Tel Aviv, Saint Martin's School of Art, London
- Known for: Conceptual art
- Movement: Israeli art

Benni Efrat (Hebrew: בני אפרת; Arabic: بني إفرات; born 1936) is an Israeli painter, sculptor, printmaker and filmmaker who was born in Beirut, Lebanon.

== Biography ==
Benni Efrat immigrated to Palestine in 1947. From 1959 to 1961, he studied at the Avni Institute of Art and Design in Tel Aviv under Yehezkel Streichman (1906–1993). From 1966 to 1976, he lived in London, where he studied at Saint Martin's School of Art in London.

== Art career ==
Benni Efrat was one of the pioneers of Israeli Conceptual artists and influenced others in this direction (e.g., Joshua Neustein, Michael Gitlin, Buky Schwartz). His works were systems of components that spoke for themselves and sought to represent no more than the sum of their parts. In the mid-1970s, his displays were accompanied by films, on the back of which the artist had painted. After settling in New York City in 1976, became involved with conceptual art, producing drawings, prints, and photographs that explore energy, space, and the perception in sculpture. Efrat currently lives in Belgium.

== Awards and recognition ==
- 1966 America-Israel Cultural Foundation
- 1969 Sixth Paris Biennale for Young Artists
- 1974 Sandberg Prize for Israeli Art, Israel Museum of Jerusalem
- 1992 America-Israel Cultural Foundation

== Gallery ==
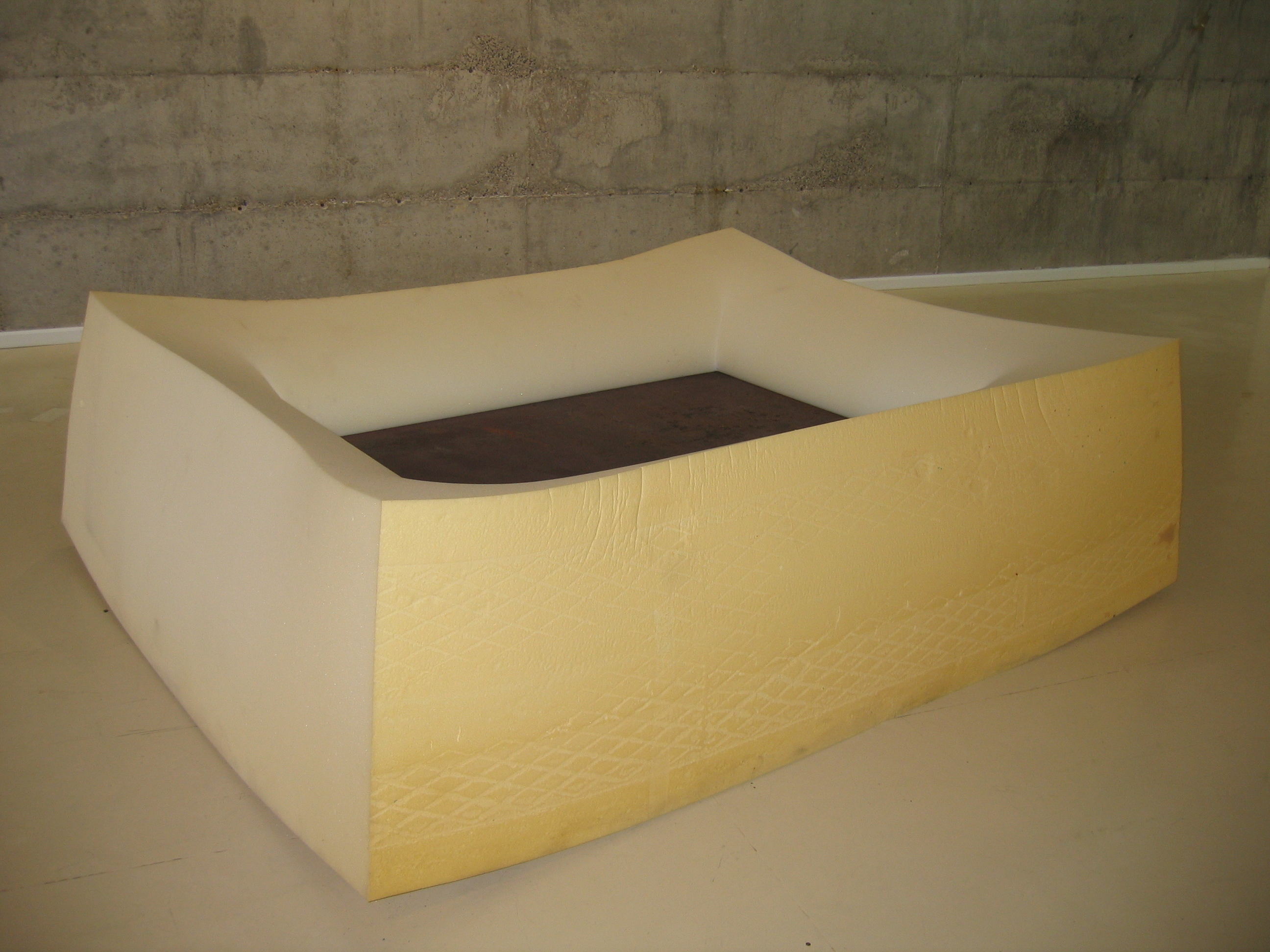
Substance moving, 1969
Sponge, foam rubber and metal panel

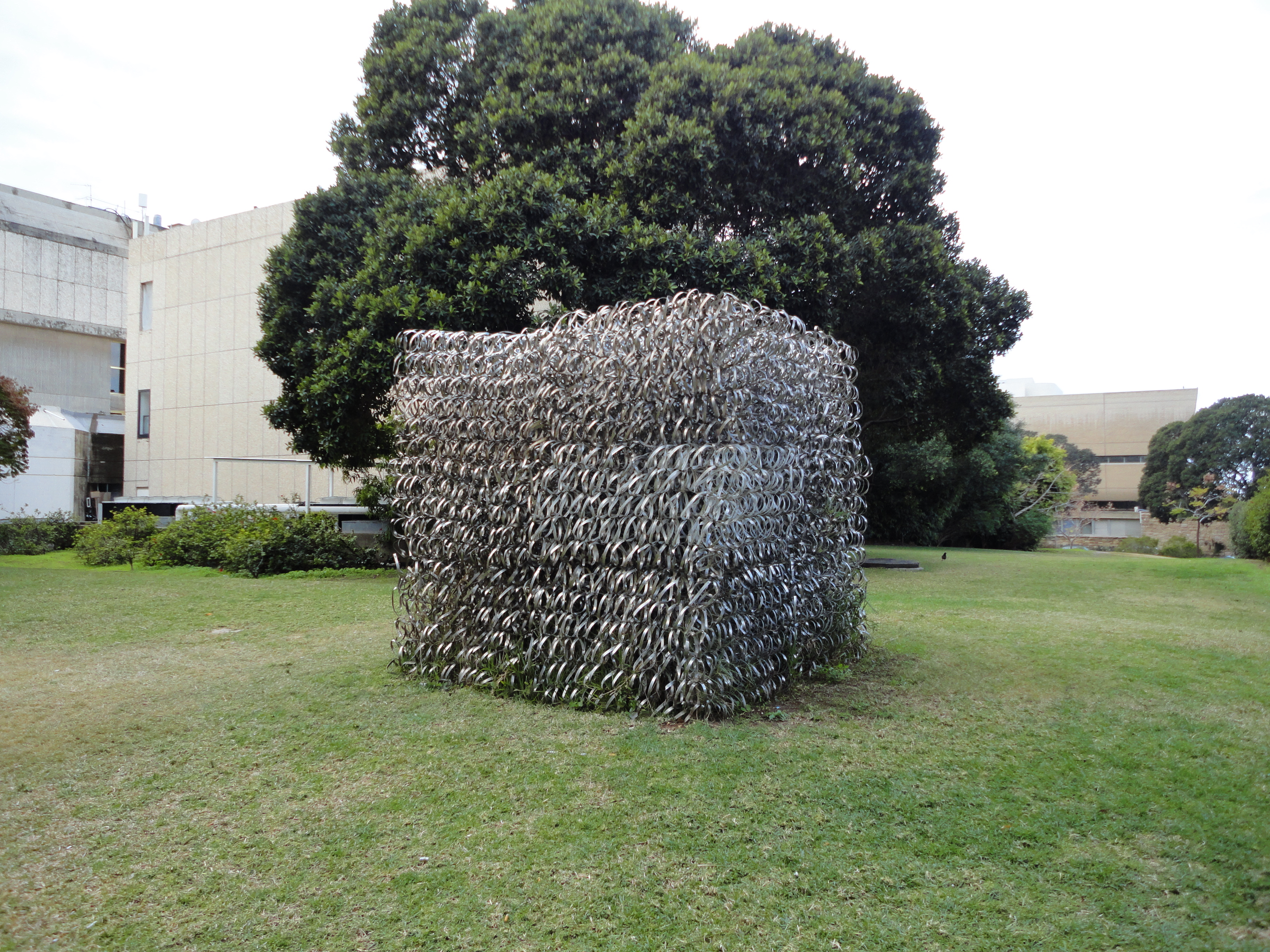
Energy, 1969
Stainless steel
Tel Aviv University

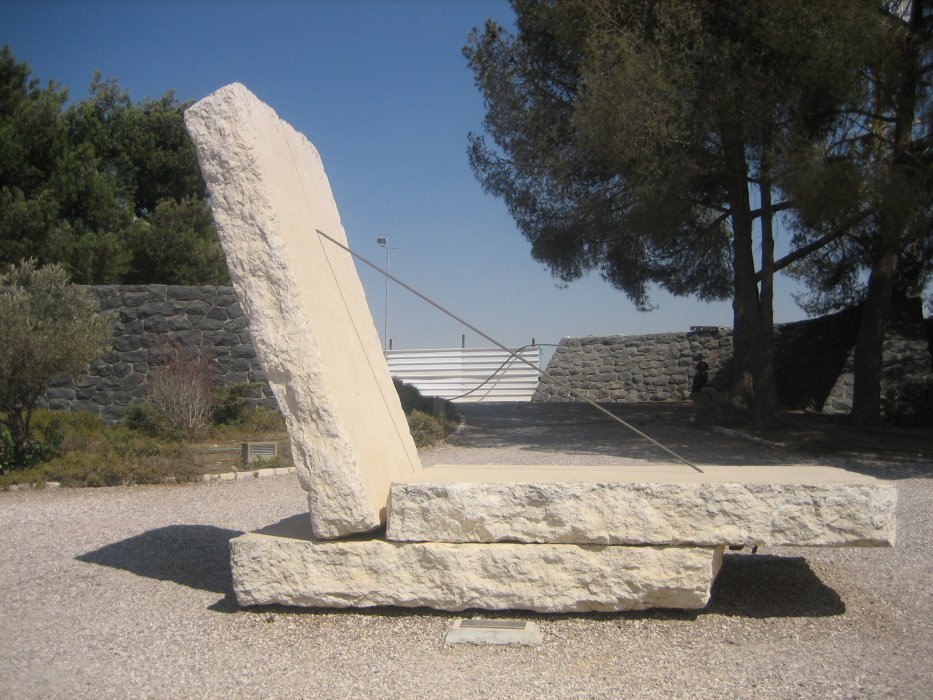
Extrapolations, limestone and steel cable sculpture, 1978, Israel Museum, Jerusalem

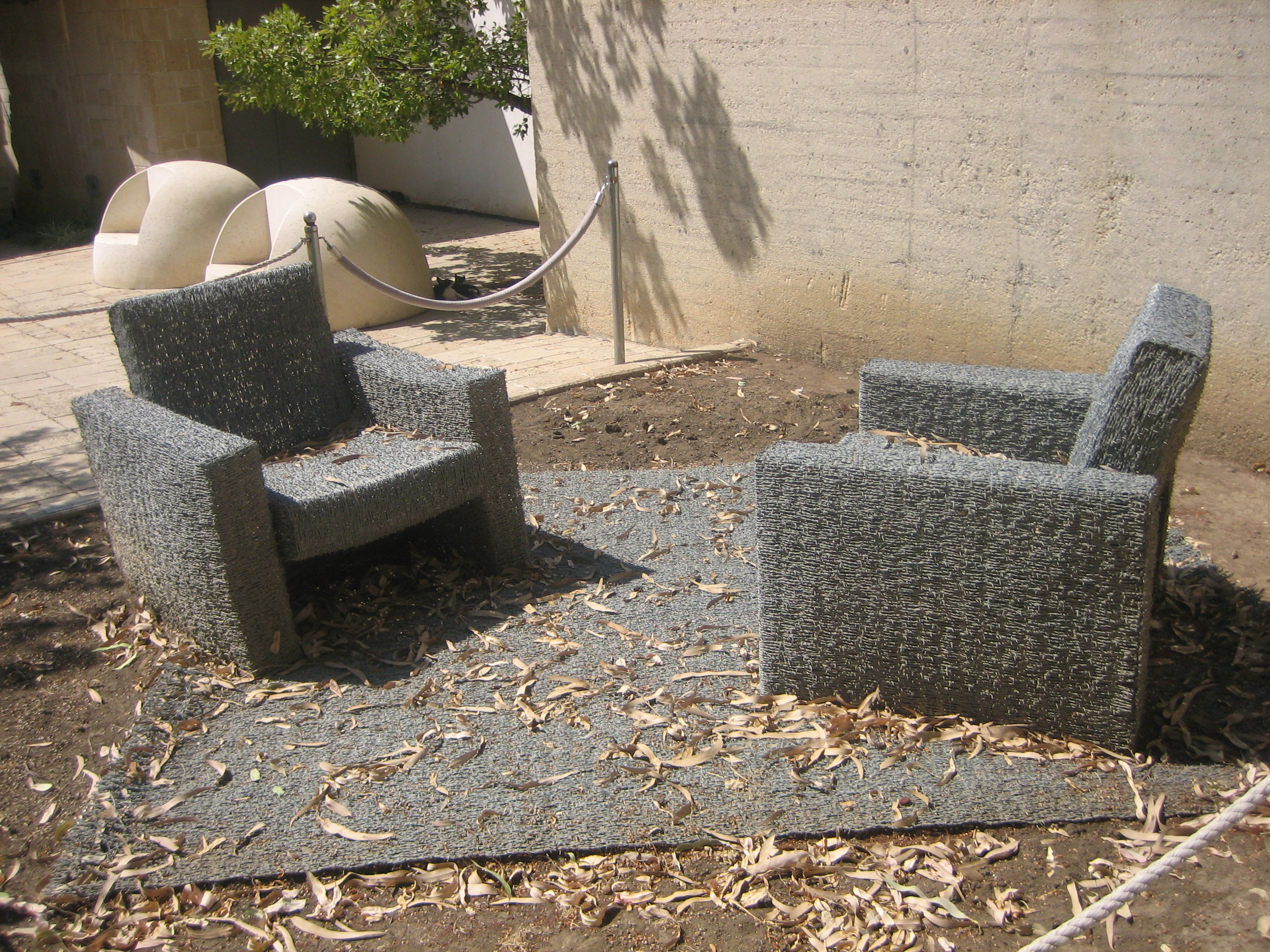
Stain on the Vision, 1999
Zinc coated barbed wire sculpture
Tel Aviv Museum of Art, Tel Aviv

== See also ==
- Visual arts in Israel
