= Anthony McCall =

British-born New York based artist (born 1946)

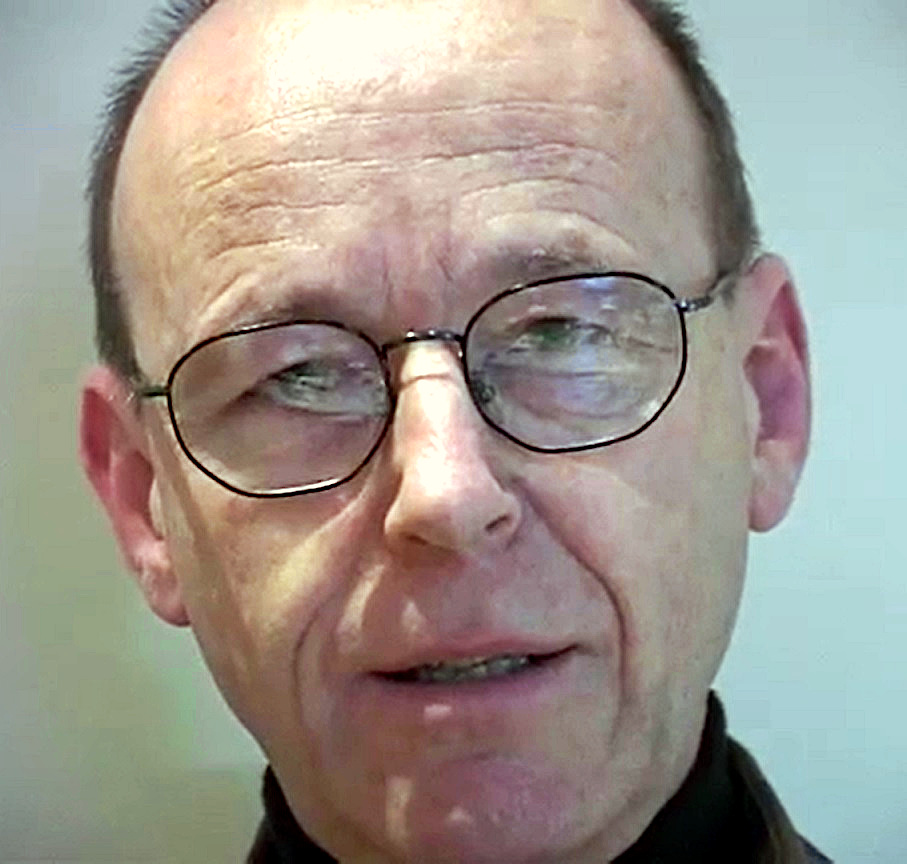
Anthony McCall c.2003

Anthony McCall (born 1946) is a British-born New York based artist known for his ‘solid-light’ installations, a series that he began in 1973 with "Line Describing a Cone," in which a volumetric form composed of projected light slowly evolves in three-dimensional space.

Occupying a space between cinema, sculpture, and drawing, his work's historical importance has been recognised in such exhibitions as "Into the Light: the Projected Image in American Art 1964–77,” Whitney Museum of American Art (2001–02); "The Expanded Screen: Actions and Installations of the Sixties and Seventies,” Museum Moderner Kunst, Vienna (2003–04); "The Expanded Eye," Kunsthaus Zurich (2006); "Beyond Cinema: the Art of Projection,” Hamburger Bahnhof, Berlin (2006–07); "The Cinema Effect: Illusion, Reality and the Projected Image,” Hirshhorn Museum, Washington DC (2008); and "On Line: Drawing Through the Twentieth Century,” Museum of Modern Art (2010–11) and “Solid Light”, Tate Modern, London (2024-25).

== Career ==
=== Early life and 1970s career ===
McCall studied graphic design and photography at Ravensbourne College of Art and Design, Bromley, Kent, England from 1964 to 1968. He became widely recognized for his groundbreaking “solid light” works, beginning with Line Describing a Cone (1973), a film installation that uses projected light to form a three-dimensional shape in space.

McCall was a key figure in the avant-garde London Film-makers Co-operative in the 1970s. His earliest films are documents of outdoor performances that were notable for their minimal use of the elements, most notably fire. McCall's first piece was called Landscape for Fire.

After moving to New York in 1973, McCall continued his fire performances and developed his 'solid light' film series, beginning with Line Describing a Cone, in 1973. Based on simple, animated line-drawings, these projections strikingly emphasise the sculptural qualities of a beam of light. In darkened, haze-filled rooms, the projections create an illusion of three-dimensional shapes, ellipses, waves and flat planes that gradually expand, contract or sweep through space. In these works, the artist sought to deconstruct cinema by reducing film to its principle components of time and light and removing the screen entirely as the prescribed surface for projection. The works also shift the relationship of the audience to film, as viewers become participants, their bodies intersecting and modifying the transitory forms.

At the end of the 1970s, McCall withdrew from making art. When he took his Line Describing a Cone installation to Konsthallen in Lund, Sweden, the artwork was rendered invisible. Very much unlike the New York lofts where dust and cigarette smoke created a haze, Swedish clean air shocked him severely, casting him into a "wilderness" that would last two decades. His showing at documenta 6 in 1977 would be his last for over 25 years.

=== Resurgence in the 2000s ===
Some twenty years later, McCall's works started to appear at such institutions as Centre Pompidou, Whitney Museum and Tate Modern. This brought his attention and he acquired a new dynamic and re-opened his 'solid light' series, this time using digital animation and digital projection rather than 16mm film.^{[1]} The first of the new works, "Doubling Back" (2003) was exhibited at the 2004 Whitney Biennial. McCall developed the use of a slow-moving cinematic ‘wipe’ to combine and separate two opposing forms within one volumetric object; the new works also explored the extended cyclical ‘installation’ structure that he had first developed in the film-based work of the seventies. New installations included "You and I, Horizontal" (2006), "Leaving, with Two-Minute Silence" (2009), and "Face to Face" (2013). McCall also developed a parallel series of vertically oriented works, starting with "Breath" (2004) in which a projector mounted on the ceiling projects directly downwards onto the floor, creating a ten-metre-tall, tent-like, almost architectural enclosure with a 4-metre wide base. Other vertical works included "Between You and I" (2006), "Meeting You Halfway" (2009), and "Coupling" (2009).

The first survey exhibition of McCall's work in an international institution took place at the Serpentine Gallery London, in 2007-8. This included early performance films, horizontal solid light works, and works on paper. The vertical works were first exhibited as a solo show ("Breath: The Vertical Works”) at Hangar Bicocca, Milan in 2009. The horizontal and vertical works were combined in a solo show at Hamburger Bahnhof, Berlin ("Five Minutes of Pure Sculpture") in 2012.

McCall has recently embarked on a new series, which use slanting beams, projected from ceiling-to-floor at a 45-degree angle. Originating from two widely separated projectors mounted on the ceiling, the beams converge at the floor, creating a single, superimposed ‘footprint’. Works include "Coming About" (2016) and the four-projector installation, "Crossing" (2016).

== Personal life ==
McCall had a relationship with performance artist Carolee Schneemann in the 1970s. They met in London and McCall followed her when she moved back to New York.

== Exhibitions and screenings ==
=== Solo exhibitions and screenings ===
- Artists Space, New York, 1974, 1976
- The Clocktower, New York, 1974.
- Collective for Living Cinema, New York, 1974, 1975
- London Film-Makers’ Cooperative, London, 1974, 1975
- Millennium Film Workshop, New York, 1974, 1976
- Museum of Modern Art, Oxford, England, 1974.
- Museum of Art, Carnegie Institute, Pittsburgh, 1975.
- Serpentine Gallery, London, 1975.
- Musée Nationale d’Art Moderne, Paris, 1976.
- The Museum of Modern Art, New York, 1976
- Pratt Institute, Dept. Of Media Arts, Brooklyn, NY, 2002.
- Centre Pompidou / Fondation Antoine de Galbert, Paris, 2004.
- Tate Britain, London, 2004.
- Museu d’Art Contemporani de Barcelona, 2005.
- Museum für Moderne Kunst, Frankfurt, 2005.
- Musée Départemental d’Art Contemporain, Rochechouart, France, 2007.
- Serpentine Gallery, London, 2007–2008.
- Hangar Bicocca, Milan, 2009.
- Moderna Museet, Stockholm, 2009.
- Hamburger Bahnhof, Berlin, 2012.
- Tate Tanks, London, 2012.
- Kunstmuseum St. Gallen, Die Lokremise, Switzerland, 2013.
- Les Abattoirs, Toulouse, 2013.
- Eye Film Museum, Amsterdam, 2014.
- LAC Lugano Arte e Cultura, Lugano, Switzerland, 2015.
- Milwaukee Art Museum, Wisconsin, 2015.
- Fundació Gaspar, Barcelona, Spain, 2016.
- Pioneer Works, Brooklyn, New York, 2018.
- The Hepworth Wakefield, Wakefield, UK, 2018.
- Albright Knox Art Gallery, Buffalo, NY, 2019.

=== Group exhibitions ===
- Gallery House, London, 1972. A Survey of the Avant-Garde in Britain.
- Institute of Contemporary Arts, London, 1976. The Festival of Expanded Cinema.
- Documenta 6, Kassel, Germany, 1977.
- Whitney Museum of American Art, New York, 2001–2002. Into the Light: The Projected Image in American Art 1964–1977.
- Tate Modern, London, 2002. Shoot Shoot Shoot: The First Decade of the London Film-Makers’ Cooperative & British Avant-Garde Film 1966–76.
- Museum Moderner Kunst (MUMOK), Vienna, 2003–2004. X-Screen: The Expanded Screen: Actions and Installations of the Sixties and Seventies.
- Hartware MedienKunstVerein (HMKV), Dortmund, Germany, 2004. Expanded Cinema: Film as Spectacle, Event and Performance.
- Whitney Museum of American Art, New York, 2004. Whitney Biennial.
- ZKM | Museum für Neue Kunst, Karlsruhe, Germany, 2005–2006. Lichtkunst aus Kunstlicht.
- Hamburger Bahnhof, Berlin, 2006–2007. Projections: Beyond Cinematic Space.
- Kunsthaus Zürich, 2006. The Expanded Eye.
- Museum für Moderne Kunst (MMK), Frankfurt, 2007. Das Kapital: Blue Chips & Masterpieces.
- San Francisco Museum of Modern Art (SFMoMA), 2007. Project, Transform, Erase: Anthony McCall and Imi Knoebel.
- Akademie der Künste, Berlin, 2008. Notation: Calculation and Form in the Arts.
- Hirshhorn Museum, Smithsonian Institution, Washington, D.C., 2008. The Cinema Effect: Illusion, Reality, and the Moving Image.
- Orchard, New York. 2008. Spring Wound.
- The Museum of Modern Art, New York, 2010–11. On Line: Drawing Through the Twentieth Century.
- Fundação Serralves, Porto, Portugal, 2011. Off the Wall. Curated by Chrissie Iles.
- Geffen Contemporary at MOCA, Los Angeles, 2012. Ends of the Earth: Land Art to 1974.
- Haus der Kunst, Munich, 2012–13. Ends of the Earth: Land Art to 1974.
- Hayward Gallery, London, 2013. Light Show.
- SFMoMA, San Francisco, 2016. About Time: Photography in a Moment of Change. Curated by Corey Keller.
- Whitney Museum of American Art, New York, 2016-17. Dreamlands: Immersive Cinema and Art, 1905-2016.
- LAM, Lille, France, 2018. Danser Brut.
- Denver Art Museum, Denver, CO, 2019. Eyes On: Anthony McCall.
- ZKM Center for Art and Media, Karlsruhe, Germany, 2019. NegaOve Space: Trajectories of Sculpture.

== Publications ==
=== Monographs and catalogues ===
- Anthony McCall and David Grubbs: Simultaneous Soloists. Texts by Anthony McCall, David Grubbs, Branden W. Joseph, and Swagato Chakravorty. Brooklyn, New York: Pioneer Works Press, 2019.
- Anthony McCall: Solid Light Works (exh. cat.). Texts by Antonio Somaini, Bettina Della Casa, Jarrett Earnest, and Luke Skrebowski. Lugano, Switzerland: LAC Lugano Arte e Cultura, 2015. (English/Italian)
- Anthony McCall: Notebooks and Conversations. Texts by Graham Ellard and Stephen Johnstone. Lund Humphries, in association with Kunstmuseum St Gallen, 2015.
- Anthony McCall: Face to Face (exh. cat.). Texts by Maxa Zoller, Luke Smythe and Anthony McCall. Amsterdam: EYE Filmmuseum, 2014.
- Anthony McCall: 1970s Works on Paper. Text by Anne Wagner. Köln: Walther König, 2013.
- Anthony McCall: Five Minutes of Pure Sculpture (exh. cat.). Text by Noam Elcott. Berlin: Nationalgalerie im Hamburger Bahnhof – Museum für Gegenwart – Berlin, 2012. (English/German)
- Anthony McCall: Breath [The Vertical Works] (exh. cat.). Text by Hal Foster. Milan: Hangar Bicocca, 2009. (English/Italian)
- Anthony McCall: Elements for a Retrospective 1972–1979 / 2003– . Text by Olivier Michelon. London: Serpentine Gallery; Rochechouart, France: Musée Départemental d’Art Contemporain; and Paris: Monografik, 2007. (English/French)
- Anthony McCall: The Solid Light Films and Related Works. Texts by Branden W. Joseph and Jonathan Walley. Edited by Christopher Eamon. Evanston, Illinois: Northwestern University Press; San Francisco: New Art Trust; and Göttingen, Germany: Steidl, 2005.
- Anthony McCall: Film Installations (exh. cat.). Texts by George Baker, Lisa Le Feuvre, Anthony McCall. Edited by Helen Legg. Coventry, England: Mead Gallery, University of Warwick, 2004.

=== Critical texts ===
- Baker, George. “Film Beyond Its Limits.” Grey Room 25 (Fall 2006), pp. 92–125.
- Bobka, Vivian. “Eye, Gaze, Screen: Anthony McCall.” Texte zur Kunst, no. 68 (December 2007).
- Elcott, Noam. “Smoke Screen.” Aperture Magazine, issue 231 (Summer 2018), pp. 73-77.
- Ellard, Graham and Johnstone, Stephen. “Anthony McCall” (Interview). Bomb, issue 97 (Fall 2006), pp. 92–125.
- Foster, Hal. “Film Stripped Bare.” In The Art-Architecture Complex, London: Verso, 2011. Chapter 9.
- McCall, Anthony. “Line Describing a Cone and Related Films”, October 103 (Winter 2003), pp 42–62.
- Michaud, Philippe-Alain. “The Geometric Cinema of Anthony McCall.” October 137 (Summer 2011).
- Richard, Laura. “Anthony McCall: The Long Shadow of Ambient Light.” Oxford Art Journal, Oxford University Press, 2012.
- Sitney, P. Adams, ed. The Avant-Garde Film: A Reader of Theory and Criticism. New York: New York University Press, 1978, pp. 250–254.
- Walley, Jonathan. “The Material of Film and the Idea of Cinema.” October 103 (Winter 2003), pp. 15–30.
