= Marc Camille Chaimowicz =

French artist (1946–2024)

Marc Camille Chaimowicz (25 January 1946 – 23 May 2024) was a French contemporary artist who was based in London. His works are found in the Museum of Modern Art, Tate Modern, and Victoria and Albert Museum collections. His cross-disciplinary work in painting, drawing, collage, sculpture, installation, furniture, lighting, ceramics, textiles, and wallpaper challenges the categorical divisions between art and design.

Chaimowicz was born on 25 January 1946 in postwar Paris to a Polish Jewish father and French Catholic mother. The family moved to England when the artist was eight years old and settled in London, where he was still living and working at the time of his death in 2024. His first solo museum exhibition in the United States was held at the Jewish Museum in New York.

Chaimowicz died on 23 May 2024, at the age of 77.

== Solo exhibitions ==
- Your Place or Mine.. The Jewish Museum, New York (2018)
- Serpentine Galleries, London (2016)
