= Joshua Neustein =

Israeli artist (born 1940)

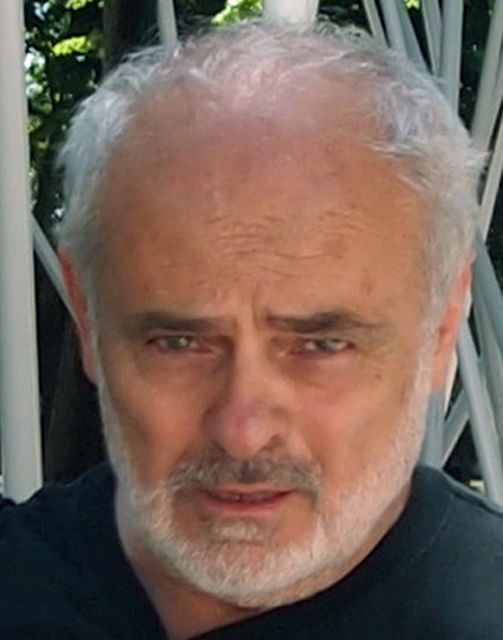
- Joshua Neustein
- Born: 1938 (age 87–88); Danzig (modern Gdańsk, Poland)
- Education: CCNY B.A., Pratt Institute, New York City
- Known for: painter, sculptor Works on Paper, Land Art, Concept, Video
- Movement: postminimalism, minimalism, Israeli art,
- Awards: Guggenheim Fellow 1986

Joshua Neustein (Hebrew: יהושע נוישטיין; born 1938) is a contemporary visual artist who lives and works in New York City. He is known for his Conceptual Art, environmental installations, Land Art, Postminimalist torn paper works, epistemic abstraction, deconstructed canvas works, and large-scale map paintings.

== Early life and education ==
Neustein was born in Danzig (present day Gdańsk, Poland). As refugees, his family immigrated to the USSR, Austria, and finally settled in Brooklyn in the early 1950s. After studying history at CCNY, and painting under Willem de Kooning at the Pratt Institute in New York City, Neustein immigrated to Jerusalem in 1964.

== Work ==
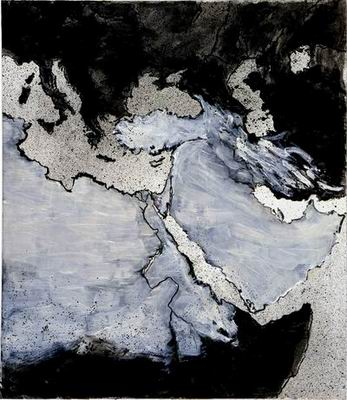
True North, 1989-1991. Acrylic on canvas and aluminum object. Permanent collection, Israel Museum, Jerusalem.

Neustein has a diverse artistic practice that includes painting, drawings and works on paper, large-scale installation, film and video, performance, and monumental land art works.

Neustein's work is held in numerous public institutional collections, including the Metropolitan Museum of Art, the Museum of Modern Art, the Whitney Museum of American Art, the Morgan Library, the Israel Museum, the Solomon R. Guggenheim Museum, the Tel Aviv Museum, Albright Knox Gallery, and others.

In recent years, Neustein's work has been included in several group exhibitions at museums and galleries, including the Nasher Sculpture Center, the Metropolitan Museum of Art, the Museum of Contemporary Art, Los Angeles, Haus Der Kunst, Munich, and David Zwirner Gallery.

Art historians Robert Pincus-Witten, Jeremy Gilbert-Rolfe, and Arthur Danto, as well as philosophers Hilary Putnam and Martin Jay, have written extensively about Neustein's work.

Between 1964 and 1998, Neustein was represented by Bertha Urdang Gallery in New York and Jerusalem. In 1979, Neustein had a solo exhibition at Mary Boone Gallery in which he showed reconstructed canvases. Between 1973 and 1977, Neustein showed at the Yodfat Gallery and Naomi Givon Gallery, in Tel Aviv.

=== Early career ===
Neustein began to show regularly in Israel and the UK, starting his "Carbon Copy Drawing" series in 1970 by "marking" carbon paper stationery with cuts, tears, and folds. However, it was his 1971 Jerusalem River Project (made in collaboration with Gerry Marx and Georgette Batlle) -- a site-specific "sound sculpture" action in which loudspeakers installed across a desert valley played the looped recorded sound of a river—that earned him more widespread recognition. Photo documentation of the piece was shown at the Israel Museum, Yvon Lambert Gallery, Paris, the Museum of Fine Arts, Boston, the Museum of Contemporary Art, Los Angeles, Museum of Contemporary Art, Tokyo, MAK Vienna, and MACBA. Curator Yonah Fischer supported Neustein's work, including him in several exhibitions at the Israel Museum such as Concept Plus Information, and assisting in the realization and display of The Jerusalem River Project. During the same period, Neustein started to build an oeuvre of large torn paper works that received critical attention.

=== Mature work ===
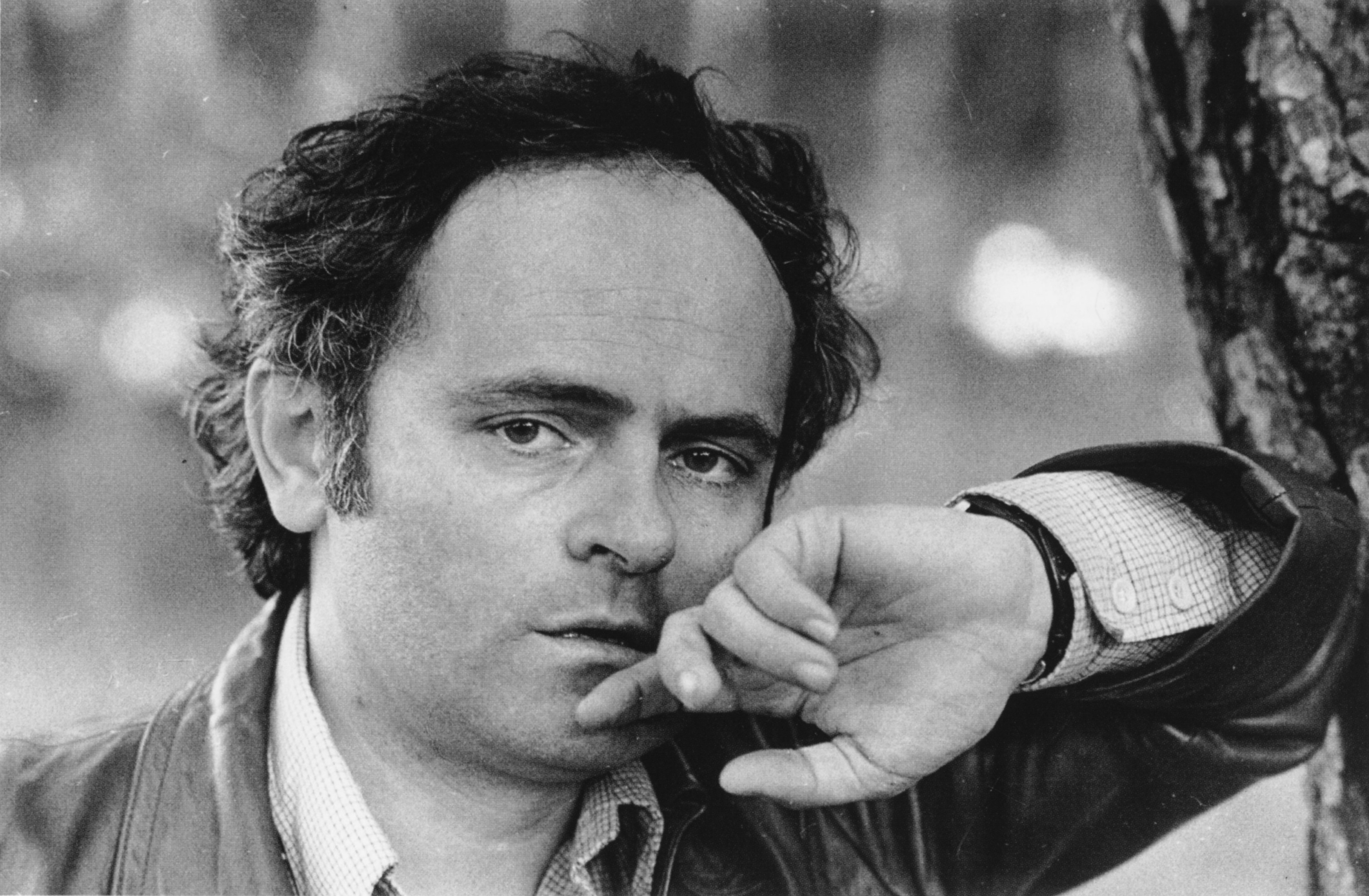
Portrait of Neustein in Jerusalem, 1972, Photograph by Aliza Auerbach

==== Drawing, installation, Territorial Imperative ====
In the same period, Neustein began an extensive and innovative drawing practice that continues today, amassing a large body of work that grew to include torn and folded works on paper, erasure drawings, magnetic "drawings", and the Carbon Paper or Carbon Copy Drawing series, in which formerly standard carbon copy paper is torn, folded, pressed, and scraped. Neustein participated in the landmark Beyond Drawing show at the Israel Museum in 1974, curated by Yona Fischer and Meira Perry Lehmann. In 1977, the Tel Aviv Museum mounted a ten-year retrospective of Neustein's works on paper, curated by Sarah Breitberg. In 1992, the Albright Knox mounted a solo show of Carbon Copy Drawings which travelled to the Grey Art Gallery at NYU. A solo show of his "magnetic drawings" were shown at Wynn Kramarsky Gallery in 1998.

Alongside his studio practice, Neustein has mounted large-scale installations throughout his career that often included quotidian objects such as hay bales, boots, pinecones, and rainwater, as well as monumental land art works. Neustein was among the first artists to introduce environmental and installation art into the Israeli art scene. Notable examples include Still Life, 1983, in which the life-size silhouette of an Israeli war plane was singed into the turf on the Israel-Lebanon border with burning tires.

In 1976, Neustein enacted Territorial Imperative, in which the artist documented a dog marking his territory along the Israeli-Syrian border in the Golan Heights, identifying spots the dog had marked with posters and maps. Neustein repeated the action in Belfast, Northern Ireland between the Catholic and Protestant neighborhoods (1977); in Kruså, Denmark, at the German/Danish border (1978); and near Kassel, Germany, along the East and West German border, as a participant in Documenta 6 (1977). Over curator Manfred Schneckenburger's objections, Neustein's work was "withdrawn" from Documenta, after the German government advised the artist that his piece caused "consternation among specialists" about what they described as the "complicated relationship between West Berlin and the German Democratic Republic."

==== Painting, Five Ash Cities and Venice Biennale ====
In the mid-1980s, Neustein produced maps painted on canvas and cardboard, or etched into rusted metal.

In the 1990s, Neustein returned to large-scale installation, with a series of environmental works he called the Five Ash Cities. He worked closely with Wendy Shafir, who was alternately his dealer, curator, and collaborator. The Ash Cities were immersive, room-sized relief maps of cities, constructed out of packed ashes that rested on the floor of the exhibition space. They often included crystal chandeliers installed to hang low to the ground, so they nearly touched the ash-covered floor. Ash Cities were realized at Southeastern Center for Contemporary Art, North Carolina; the Ujazdów Castle, Warsaw; moCa, Cleveland, curated by Jill Snyder; Bilder Sind Verboten at Martin Gropius-bau, Berlin, curated by Eckhart Gillen and Amnon Barzel; and the Herzliya Museum, curated by Wendy Shafir. In 1990, another chandelier work, How History Became Geography was exhibited at the Barbican Centre, London. Documentation was later shown by the Israel Museum.

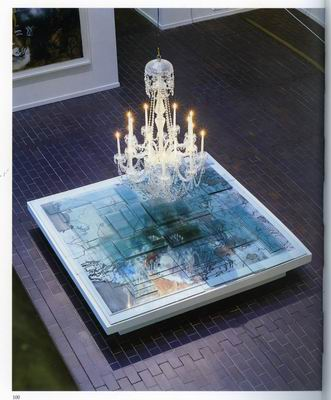
How History Became Geography Joshua Neustein

In 1995, Neustein was selected to represent Israel in the Venice Biennale. For The Possessed Library, curated by Gideon Ofrat, Neustein had two large cranes parked nearby the Israeli Pavilion, the facade of which he surrounded with construction scaffolding. Plexiglas panels etched with book titles lined the scaffolding, resembling books on shelves, while bubble wrap sacks hung suspended from the cranes, one just above the pavilion's roof, the other dipping in through a skylight in "The Tosca Room". "The Tosca Room" walls were covered in soot, while its floors were strewn with terra-cotta letters under plexiglass. A soundtrack played a whistled version of the "E Lucevan Le Stelle" aria from Tosca. Neustein later used recycled components from the Biennale in The Blind Library (1998) at Bet Ariella Library.

In 1996, Neustein's work was included in the Arturo Schwarz Collection exhibition at the Israel Museum.

In 1998, several of Neustein's environmental works were exhibited in Out of Actions, curated by Paul Shimmel at LA MOCA, and traveling to MAK Vienna, Museu d'Art Contemporani de Barcelona, Museum of Contemporary Art Tokyo, Japan.

==== 2000s and 2010s ====
During the early- and mid-2000s, Neustein had significant participations in exhibitions at the Palazzo Delle Arti Napoli, the Haifa Museum of Art, the Time Depot, and the Chelsea Art Museum. During this time, Neustein permanently installed a life-size bronze cast of a tree with terra-cotta colored letters climbing its trunk in the lobby of the JCC in Manhattan.

In 2010, the Royal Ontario Museum, Toronto commissioned Margins, an installation that included a chandelier embedded in the wall alongside texts screened onto the wall and plexiglass sheets, referring to the writings of Edmond Jabès.

In 2012, Neustein mounted a large-scale retrospective at the Israel Museum, Jerusalem, titled Drawing in the Margins, which included 67 works spanning 40 years. The exhibition was curated by Meira Perry Lehmann. Neustein mounted Boss, a solo exhibition at Untitled gallery on New York's Lower East Side, the same year.

In the past decade, Neustein has participated in numerous group exhibitions at museums and galleries, including the Metropolitan Museum of Art (Paper Trails, a historic show of works on paper curated by Marla Prather in 2011), the Nasher Sculpture Center, LA MOCA (the Museum of Contemporary Art, Los Angeles), the Haus Der Kunst, Munich, and David Zwirner Gallery. For LA MOCA, Neustein reenacted Road Piece (1971) as part of "Ends of the Earth", an exhibition on Land Art curated by Philipp Kaiser and art historian Miwon Kwon. The show travelled to the Haus Der Kunst with director and curator Okwui Enwezor.

== Selected works list ==
=== Painting and Drawings ===
Earliest works: Oil pastel paintings; torn folded drawings; carbon copy series; text by Barry Schwabsky.

Jeremy Gilbert Rolfe essay Torn Grey Impermanent. Artforum Summer 1978

Was part of an art movement called Epistemic Abstraction by Robert Pincus-Witten see Eye to Eye: 20 Years of Art Criticism, Robert Pincus-Witten, Paperback (1984)

=== Land & installation works ===
- Rainwater, 1968; in which water trickled down a suspended metal tube from roof onto a pan on the floor.
- Boots, 1969 (collaboration with Gerry Marx), in which piles of military boots from armies that passed through Ottoman, Palestine and Israel, shown in Artists House, Jerusalem.
- Jerusalem River Project, 1971 (collaboration with Gerard Marx and Georgette Batlle.) Sound sculpture of recorded water sounds played in a wadi. Shown in "Earth Air Fire Water," Museum of Fine Arts, Boston, 1971
- Road Piece, 1971
- Dead Sea Journey, 1971; film made from 3 postcards
- Photo Strategies, 1971, Israel Museum and Camden Arts Centre London UK
- Barrier Piece Israel Museum 1971
- Hay Bales, 1971 bales of hay and sound tapes of highway traffic, Tel Aviv Museum and Camden Arts Centre
- Hay Bales and Hay Bindings, 1971–1999, first shown at Gallery House, London
- Sound tapes and video pieces, 1971, Gallery House, London.
- Listening to Hay, 1972, Gallery House, London
- Sound Sculptures, 1972, Goethe House London
- Mobile Landscape, 1974
- Photo Triennale Israel Museum 1975,
- Territorial Imperative, 1976–79, Golan Heights; Krusa, Denmark; Kassel, Germany (commissioned, then withdrawn from Documenta 6); Belfast, Northern Ireland
- Still Life, 1983. Life-size burned silhouette of airplane singed into turf at Lebanon/Israel Border.
- Where Are the Miami Indians, 1983
- How History Became Geography, 1990. Barbican Arts Centre, London.
- Still Life on the Border, 1993
- Possessed Library, 1995, Israel Pavilion, Venice Biennale. Soot, books, cranes, alphabet, glass, scaffolding, whistling soundtrack.
- 5 Ash Cities 1996-2000 - SECCA North Carolina; moCa Cleveland; Martin Gropius Bau, Berlin, Germany 1998; Ujazdowsky Palace CCA Warsaw, Poland; Herzliya Museum Israel.
- Blind Library, 1998, Tel Aviv Israel
- Fanning the Fear, 2003
- What Did I Forget, 2004

== Selected bibliography ==
- Danto, Arthur (2005). "Two Installations by Joshua Neustein". Unnatural Wonders: Essays from the Gap Between Art and Life. New York: Farrar, Straus, and Giroux, 2005. pp. 303–320. ISBN 978-0-231-14115-4

== Education ==
- Pratt Institute, New York City
- Art Students' League, New York City

== Awards and prizes ==
- 1970 Erest Prize for Painting and Sculpture, Jerusalem
- 1972 The Jerusalem Prize
- 1974 Sandberg Prize for Israeli Art, Israel Museum, Jerusalem
- 1986 Guggeneheim Fellowship, John Simon Guggenheim Memorial Foundation, New York, New York, USA
- 1990 Grant, The Pollock-Krasner Foundation, New York
