= Debel =

Debel may refer to:

- Debel, Lebanon
- Debel, Oromo Name, Oromo, Ethiopia, African name for a boy meaning 'in addition to, gift of '
- Debel, Ethiopia, a town in the Afar Region
- DEBEL, the Defence Bioengineering and Electromedical Laboratory, an Indian national defense laboratory under DRDO, located in Bangalore.
- Debel Gallery
- Etienne Debel (1931-1993), Flemish-born actor and director

== See also ==
- Debelle, surname
- DeBell, surname
