= Mordecai Ardon =

Israeli painter (1896–1992)

Mordecai Ardon מרדכי ארדון
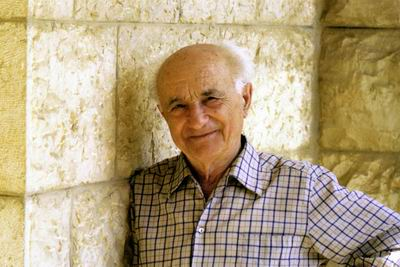
- Ardon in 1977
- Born: Max Bronstein; 13 July 1896; Tuchów, Galicia, Austria-Hungary
- Died: 18 June 1992 (aged 95); Jerusalem
- Awards: Israel Prize (1963)

Mordecai Ardon (Hebrew: מרדכי ארדון; 13 July 1896 – 18 June 1992) was an Israeli painter.

== Biography ==
Girl, 1950

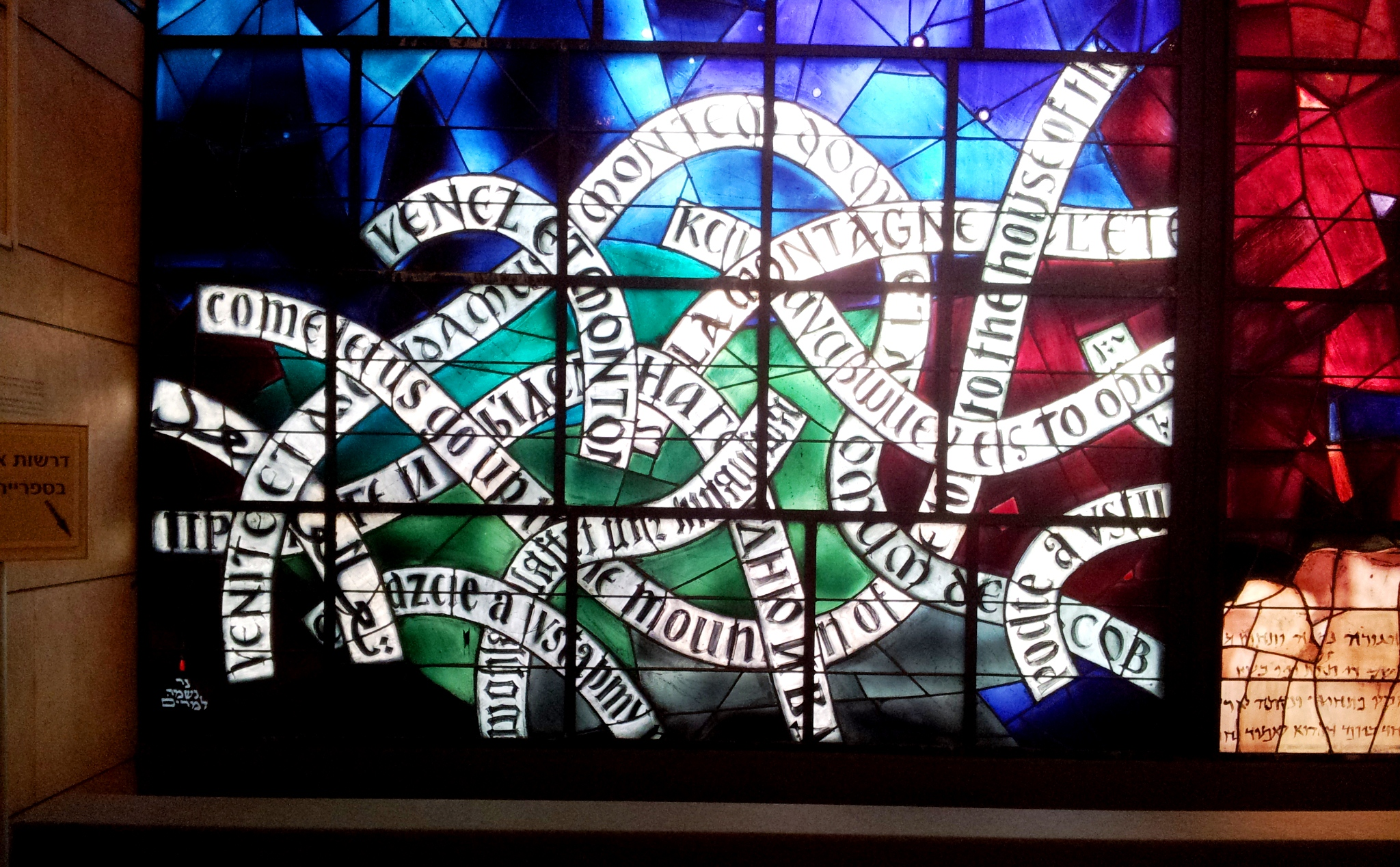
Stained glass windows, National Library of Israel, Jerusalem

Max Bronstein (later Mordecai Ardon) was born in Tuchów, Galicia (then Austria-Hungary, now Poland). He pursued architecture between 1921 and 1925 in the Bauhaus University in Weimar, Germany. Studying among other notable painters such as Johannes Itten, Wassily Kandinsky, and Paul Klee. For about a year, following his studies, he worked with Max Doerner at the Academy of Decorative Arts in Munich. In 1933 he immigrated to Mandate Palestine, settling in Jerusalem. He was granted British Mandatory Palestinian citizenship in 1936 and changed his name to Mordecai Ardon.

After settling in Jerusalem, he would go on to become a teacher in the Bezalel Academy of Arts and Design in 1935. Between 1940 and 1952, he served as its director. From 1952 to 1963 he became the artistic adviser to the Ministry of Education and Culture of Israel.

== Art career ==
He participated in the Venice Biennale of 1968.

Beginning in the 1950s Ardon adopted a complex system of symbolic images in his paintings, taken from the Jewish Mystical tradition (Kabbalah), from the Bible and from a tangible reality. In his painting "Gates of Light", for example, he expressed "the inner mystery and timelessness of the landscape." His work seeks to impart a cosmic dimension to the present, linking it to antiquity and mystery. The same approach can be found in "At the Gates of Jerusalem" (1967), which shows the attempt to "convey his feelings about the cosmic significance of Israel's return to the Old City of Jerusalem during the Six-Day War". "Bird near a yellow wall" (1950) demonstrates his simplistic involvement with the Holocaust, a subject to which he was one of the few Israeli artists to devote a phase of his work, at that time.

As a teacher and director of the "New Bezalel", Ardon conveyed his sense of social involvement, his tendency towards Jewish mysticism and local mythology, and the combination of personal national symbols with reality-always stressing masterful technique. Pupils such as Avigdor Arikha, Yehuda Bacon, Naftali Bezem, Shraga Weil, Shmuel Boneh, and Bernat Klein absorbed these influences and integrated them into their later work.

Ardon was seen as the father of the regional approach in Israeli art.

One of his most famous creations are the "Isaiah’s Vision of Eternal Peace" (1980–1984), a set of large stained-glass windows displayed prominently in the National Library of Israel in Jerusalem, incorporating visual elements from the Kabbalah.

Ardon died in Jerusalem in 1992.

In 2014 his painting "The Awakening" (1969) was sold at Sotheby's for $821,000. In 2006 his painting "The Woodpecker of Time" (1963) was sold at Christie's for $643,200.

== Education ==
- 1920-25 Bauhaus School, Weimar, Germany, with Itten, Klee, Kandinsky, Feininger
- 1926 Studied with Max Doerner

== Teaching ==
- 1929 Kunstschule Itten, Berlin
- 1935 Seminar, Bet Hakerem, Jerusalem
- 1935-52 Bezalel, Jerusalem
- 1940-52 Bezalel, Jerusalem, Director
- 1952-63 Ministry of Education and Culture, Jerusalem, Supervisor and Art Advisor

== Awards and recognition ==
- 1954 Unesco Prize
- 1963, Ardon was awarded the Israel Prize, in painting.
- 1974, he received the Yakir Yerushalayim (Worthy Citizen of Jerusalem) award.
- 1974 Doctor of Honor, Hebrew University of Jerusalem
- 1988 Boris Schatz Prize
- 1992 Isracard Prize, Tel Aviv Museum

== See also ==
- List of Israel Prize recipients
- Israeli art
