= Debel Gallery =

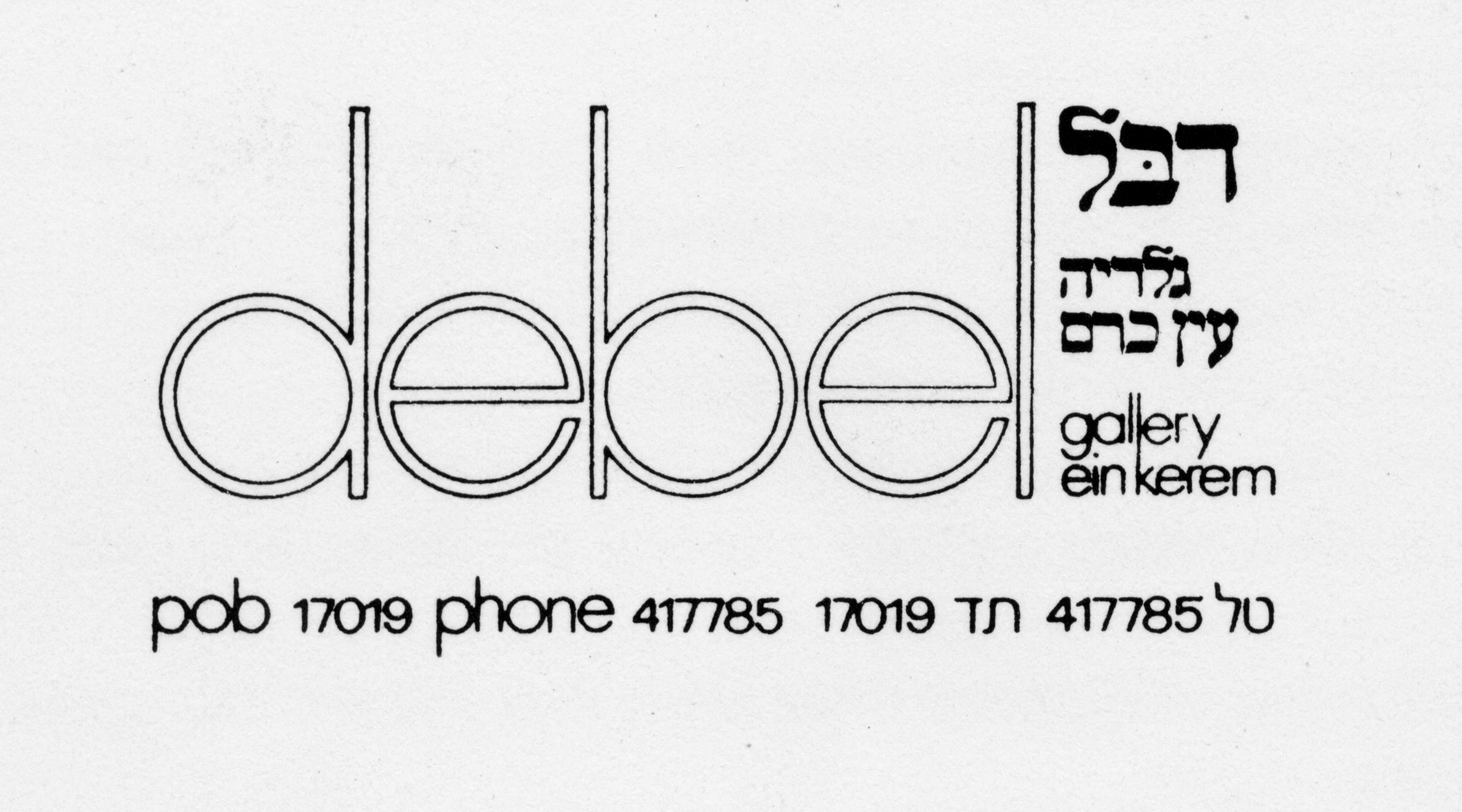
- Debel Gallery (Logo)
- Established: 1973
- Dissolved: 1990
- Location: Ein Kerem, Jerusalem
- Coordinates: 31.768201°N 35.160252°E
- Type: Gallery

The Debel Gallery was a private art gallery in Jerusalem from 1973 to 1990. It is notable for its exhibition of avant-garde art. Its history and materials are cataloged at The Debel Gallery Archive.

== History ==
The Debel Gallery was opened in 1973 in Jerusalem, when the city was a pilgrimage center for curators, journalists and art enthusiasts. Etienne and Ruth Debel opened the Gallery in the basement of their home in Ein Kerem. It represented well-known artists, and discovered new ones. In addition, the Gallery exhibited avant-garde artists, which was unusual for a private gallery; for example, in 1974 the Austrian artist Rudolf Schwarzkogler, and in 1976 the Gallery staged a performance of "Nidah" by Yocheved Weinfeld. Among the artists exhibited were the Israeli artists Yair Garbuz, Raffi Lavie, Gabriel Cohen, Yocheved Weinfeld, Maya Cohen-Levy, Daniela Passal; internationally famous artists such as Alexander Calder, David Hockney and many others. At the same time, the Debel Gallery promoted a group of artists who were considered to be on the "fringe" of the avant-garde artists. They were identified with Bezalel such as Zeev Raban, Meir Gur-Arieh, and Shmuel Levi; figurative artists such as Samuel Bak and Naftali Bezem. There was also a group of new immigrants from the U.S.S.R. who were also promoted by the Debel Gallery such as Naftali Bezem, Alexander Okun, Valentin Shorr, Anatoli Basin, and many others.

While curating different exhibitions, Ruth used to interview the exhibiting artists. She recorded their conversations and transcribed them. In a collaboration between Ruth Debel and Mamuta at the Daniela Passal Art and Media Center, selected interviews were bound together into a booklet named ‘Dialogue’.

The Debel Gallery Archive was given to the Israel Museum in Jerusalem in January 2007. The Debel Gallery Archive is housed within the Information Center for Israeli Art at the Israel Museum, Jerusalem. It includes background material, exhibition histories, photos of invitations from 1973 to 1990, recordings of interviews with artists, correspondence with artists.
