= Shmuel Levi =

Israeli painter (1884–1966)

- שמואל לוי
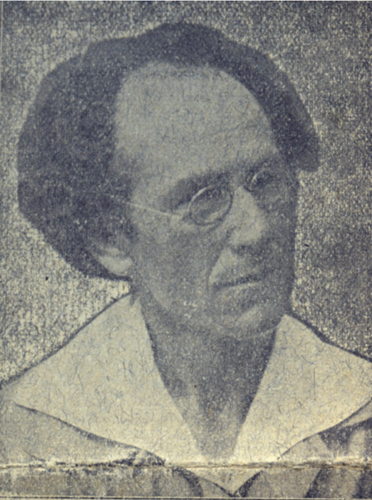
- Shmuel Levi; Photograph from an exhibition invitation, 1927; Debel Gallery Archives
- Born: שמואל לוי; 14 March 1884; Sofia, Bulgaria
- Died: July 1966
- Education: National Academy of Art, Académie Julian
- Known for: Painting
- Movement: Israeli art

Shmuel Levi (Hebrew: שמואל לוי; 14 March 1884 – July 1966) was an Israeli painter.

== Biography ==
Shmuel Levi (Ophel) was born in Sofia, Bulgaria. The name Opal was added by him as a pen name, yet at some point Levi abandoned it. His artwork stressed the Orientalist style especially seen by the Yemenite Jews.

His parents were Abraham and Naomi Levi. After completing his studies in gymnasia, he began his studies at the National Academy of Art, Sofia. With the establishment of the Bezalel Academy in 1906, Levi immigrated to the Land of Israel at the invitation of Boris Schatz. While at the academy, Levi organized the first choir at Bezalel.

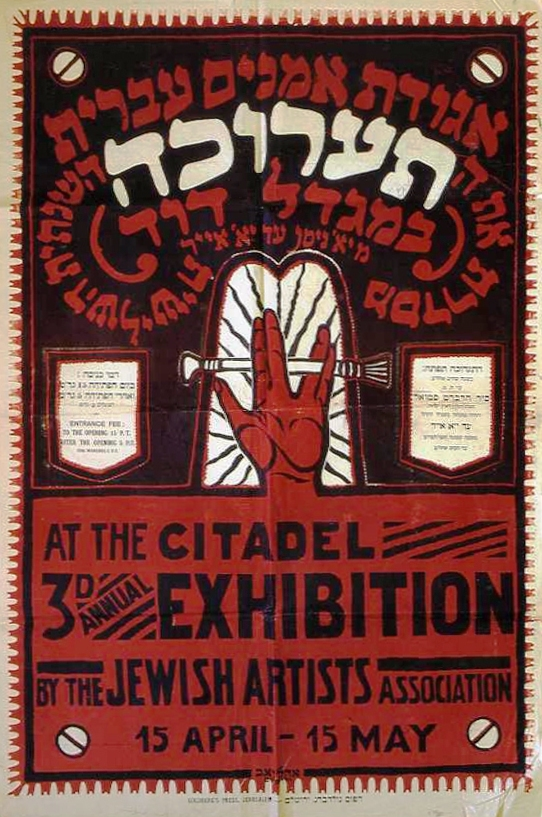
A 1924 banner announcing the third annual exhibition of the "Jewish Artist Association" at the Tower of David which Shmuel Levi established and chaired

Levi spoke of the praise he was given as well as the financial reward which resulted from his exhibition in Czarist Russia. This success allowed him to study in the Académie Julian, Paris in 1913. While in Paris he participated in the French "Orientalist" exhibition. Upon his return to the Land of Israel, at the start of the First World War, Levi was active in the local art scene. In 1920, Levi was among the founders of the Jewish Artist Association and chaired their first committee. In 1921, Levi was the founder and in charge of the Zionist Tourist Association of Sofia. On 18 April 1927, he opened an exhibition of his works in the house of Yosef Eliyahu Chelouche in Tel Aviv. In 1931, he exhibited in the Galerie Sélection in France.

Levi was among the founders of the Beit Haam (see Hebrew article מרכז ז'ראר בכר) in Jerusalem and decorated the building with painted walls and ceilings. In 1960, there was a retrospective exhibition of his works at the Tel Aviv Museum and at the Jerusalem Artists House. His artwork is found among the collections of many museums including the Musée du Luxembourg, Paris.

== Education ==
- 1901–1905 National Academy of Art, Sofia
- 1906 Bezalel Academy
- 1913 Académie Julian, Paris

== Teaching ==
- Bezalel Academy
- Hebrew Teachers' College
- Herzliya Hebrew Gymnasium, Jerusalem
- Lemmel Elementary School, Jerusalem

== Exhibitions ==
- 1912 exhibition in Czarist Russia
- 1914 "Orientalist" Association exhibition in Paris
- 1921 Participated in the first annual international exhibition of the Jewish Artist Association at the Tower of David
- 1927 exhibition at the house of Yosef Eliyahu Chelouche, Tel Aviv
- 1931 exhibited in the Galerie Sélection in France
- 1960 retrospective exhibition, the Tel Aviv Museum and at the Jerusalem Artists House
