= Yocheved Weinfeld =

Israeli artist

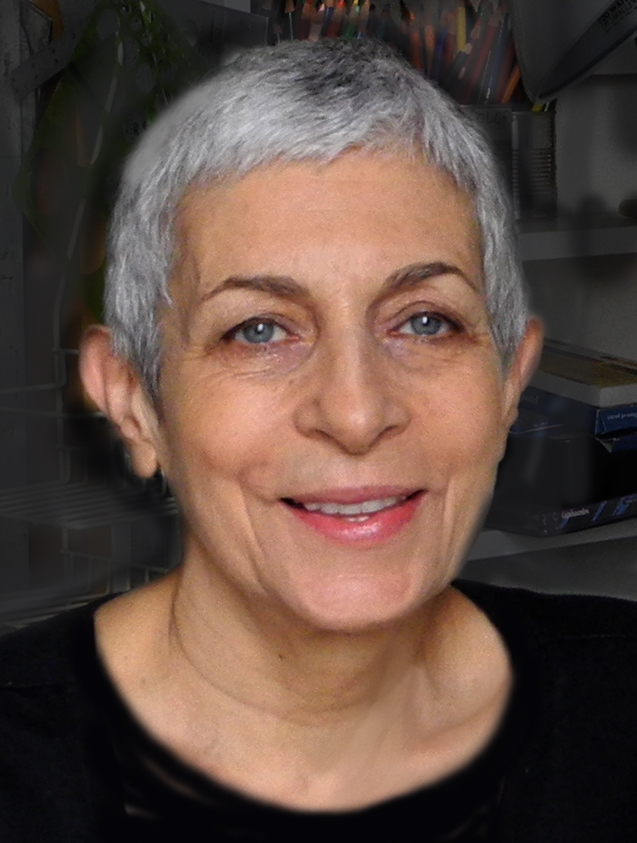
Weinfeld in 2012

Yocheved "Juki" Weinfeld (Hebrew: יוכבד וינפלד; born 1947) is an artist, museum educator and developer of interactive exhibitions for children. She studied at the Tel Aviv University and the State Art Teacher's College (Israel); at the Hebrew University of Jerusalem and at the Michaelis School of Art at the University of Cape Town in South Africa).

Weinfeld taught art at the Israel Museum in Jerusalem, the State Art Teacher's College, the Bezalel Academy of Art and Design and at the Michaelis School of Art, University of Cape Town. She also developed and designed educational exhibitions for children at the Israel Museum in Jerusalem (Israel), the Jewish Museum in New York, and at the Jewish Children's Learning Lab (now known as the Children's Galleries for Jewish Culture) in New York which she co-founded in 1995.

Weinfeld is considered one of the first Israeli artists to explore her heritage as a Jewish woman using contemporary means. She exhibited her work in numerous one-woman shows in Israel since the 1970s (e.g., the Israel Museum, Bograshov Gallery, Gordon Gallery, Debel Gallery, Mabat Gallery). She also participated in many international group exhibitions in museums and galleries around the world.

Her works are included in the collections of the Israel Museum in Jerusalem, the Hamburg Kunsthallein Germany, the Tel Aviv Museum, the Haifa Museum and in various private collections. Weinfeld lives and works in New York City.

== Biography ==
Yocheved (Juki) Weinfeld (née Ewa Ernst) was born in 1947 in the Silesian city of Legnica (Poland), and lived in Wrocław, also in Silesia. Before World War II, her father Natan Ernst (b. 1909) was a prosperous manufacturer of men's shirts in Przemyśl, Poland and her mother, Klara, had just graduated from the local vocational high school. Natan's Parents were shot by the Nazis and he spent the war in hiding. Klara obtained false documents and, posing as an Aryan, served as a housekeeper for a German SS officer stationed in Poland. They met and married after the war.

In 1957 the Ernst family emigrated to Israel, and after a few months in Tel-Aviv settled in Givatayim, a town near Tel-Aviv. While Ewa, now Yocheved, was considered an overall gifted child, her exceptional talents in drawing, acting and writing received particular attention.

At the age of 16 she was taken on as a student by the prominent Israeli artist and teacher, Raffi Lavie, and before she was 20, her works were being shown alongside her mentor's in exhibitions staged by the avant-garde group 10+. In 1967 she married David Weinfeld, then a Doctoral student at the Hebrew University in Jerusalem and an Orthodox Jew. In 1977 the marriage ended in divorce. In 1980, Weinfeld married Steven Kasher and moved to New York. In 1985 she gave birth to their daughter Talia Kasher. In 1993 the couple divorced.

== Art ==
In 1969 Weinfled exhibited her early paintings in a one-woman show in Mabat Gallery in Tel-Aviv. The paintings explored containments of biomorphic shapes (such as flesh) within geometric boundaries. The exhibition was met with disdain by most of the local art critics.

Over the next three years Weinfeld experimented with other juxtapositions of stylistic contrasts. Those were exhibited in numerous group shows, and eventually in 1972 in a one-woman show at the Bar-Kochba Gallery in Tel-Aviv. The exhibition met with mixed reviews. Reuven Berman wrote in The Jerusalem Post: "… Paintings based on internal stylistic and conceptual contrasts that break down fundamentally into a reasoned, studied, restrained approach on the one hand, and a spontaneous, gestural, painterly approach on the other… But the contrasts are lively and the show as a whole bears evidence of intellectual alertness…"

In 1973 following her mother's death and the Yom Kippur War, in an attempt to relinquish her facile drawings, and out of need to express her reaction to the scarred flesh and the scarred society, Weinfeld started experimenting with stitches on paper in lieu of pencil lines, and sometimes next to them. Some of those "drawings" were perceived as erotic and feminine, if not feminist. Stitching paper and canvas gave way to a renewed interest in flesh and body.

In 1974, in a one-woman show at the Debel Gallery in Jerusalem, Weinfeld – again interested in paradox – exhibited, among other works, a series of photographs of stitched hands and faces. These works that were in fact stitched photographs re-photographed, led way to works that became increasingly less concerned with esthetics or style and more conceptual in nature. The scarred, stitched "drawings" along with the stitched body parts, caused some critics to place Weinfeld's art within the Body-Art movement, and within it as feminist in nature.

In 1975, following her interest in synaesthesia and the definition of art as "an expression of what cannot be expressed otherwise", Weinfeld explored the capability of visual art to transmit tactile physical bodily sensations, such as the sensation of hunger, or pain in the roots of hair. She juxtaposed scientific and descriptive text with objects that strove to transmit bodily sensations visually. With the exception of Yigal Zalmona (Maariv, 3.21.75), most critics described the topics as unworthy of artistic endeavor.

In 1976, after reading the Code of Jewish Law (Shulhan Arukh), texts which she found fascinating and evocative, Weinfeld created a performance as part of her exhibition at the Debel Gallery. During the performance the artist explored visual, mythical images of prohibitions and rituals related to cleanliness and mourning, prompted by those texts. She acted out her own interpretation of the proscribed rituals. The content of the performance was, by virtue of the topic and the female artist's prism, feminine, but not Feminist, in nature. In an artistic environment that shunned the mention of the Holocaust and Jewish religious topics, it was one of the first times that an artist used Jewish ancient and modern heritage as an inspiration for what was considered at the time an avant-garde work of art. In his article about the exhibition in Art News, ("Whimsey and poetry; traumas and taboos" September, 1976), Meir Ronnen wrote: "One left the gallery questioning many aspects of our Judeo-Christian cultural heritage – a heritage of pain, suffering, superstition and a mystic belief in man's ability to rise above the physical in purification rites." Despite the fact that the original video documentation of the performance was lost, and only still photographs remain, the performance is often cited in studies, journals and books as a seminal work in Israeli art.

In 1979 Weinfeld's interest turned to primary images in memory and the ways they change and reoccur in subsequent memories. In her one-person show at the Israel Museum she exhibited ten large complex works, each based on a childhood memory represented by a text. Each work consisted of posed photographs of herself, three-dimensional objects and painted surfaces. Stephanie Rachum, the exhibition's curator wrote in the catalogue: "The deliberate disregard for the aesthetic aspect coupled with the stress on the ideational process which exist in Weinfeld's work is part of her Conceptual art background. – This lack of transposing imbues the objects with vitality, energy and potency. – Often the spectator feels that he has a 'direct line' to the sources that motivated or instigated the image."

In the fall of 1979 Weinfeld moved to NY where she continued her work on complex memory pieces in the work "You look so typically Jewish" and in the series "Stories for Little Children", exhibited at the Gordon Gallery in Tel-Aviv in 1981. The following year, Weinfeld experimented with posing figures painted in diverse styles in realistic scenes. The works, titled "Sentences", were exhibited at the Gordon Gallery in Tel-Aviv in 1982.

In 1991 Weinfeld exhibited two series of works, "Mother's Clichés" and "For the initiated history consists of just a few words". The exhibition, at the Bograshov Gallery in Tel-Aviv, was curated by Ariella Azoulay Armon who wrote an essay in the accompanying catalogue.

== Gallery ==
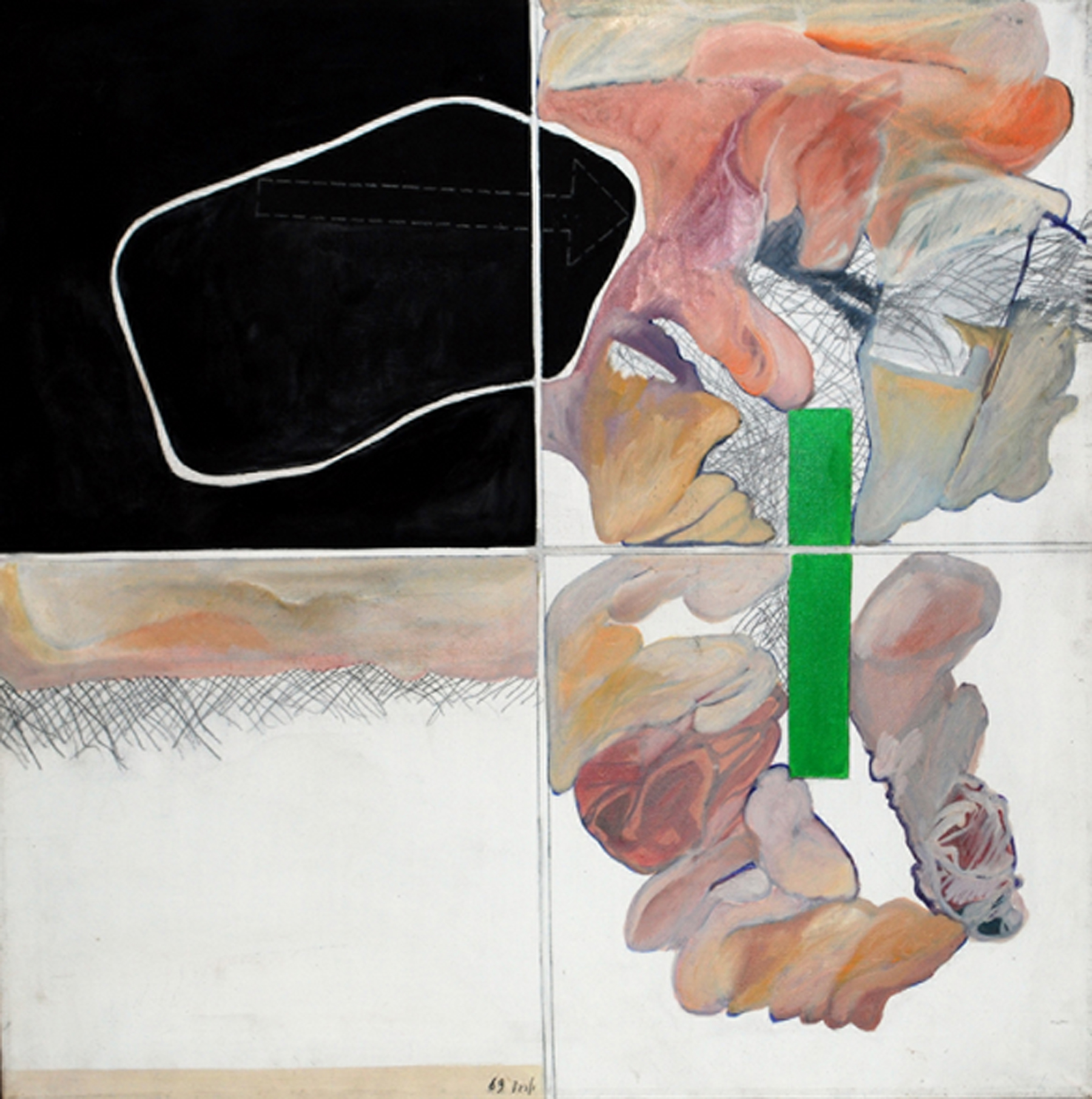
1969, Mabat Gallery. Oil and pencil on linen. Private Collection

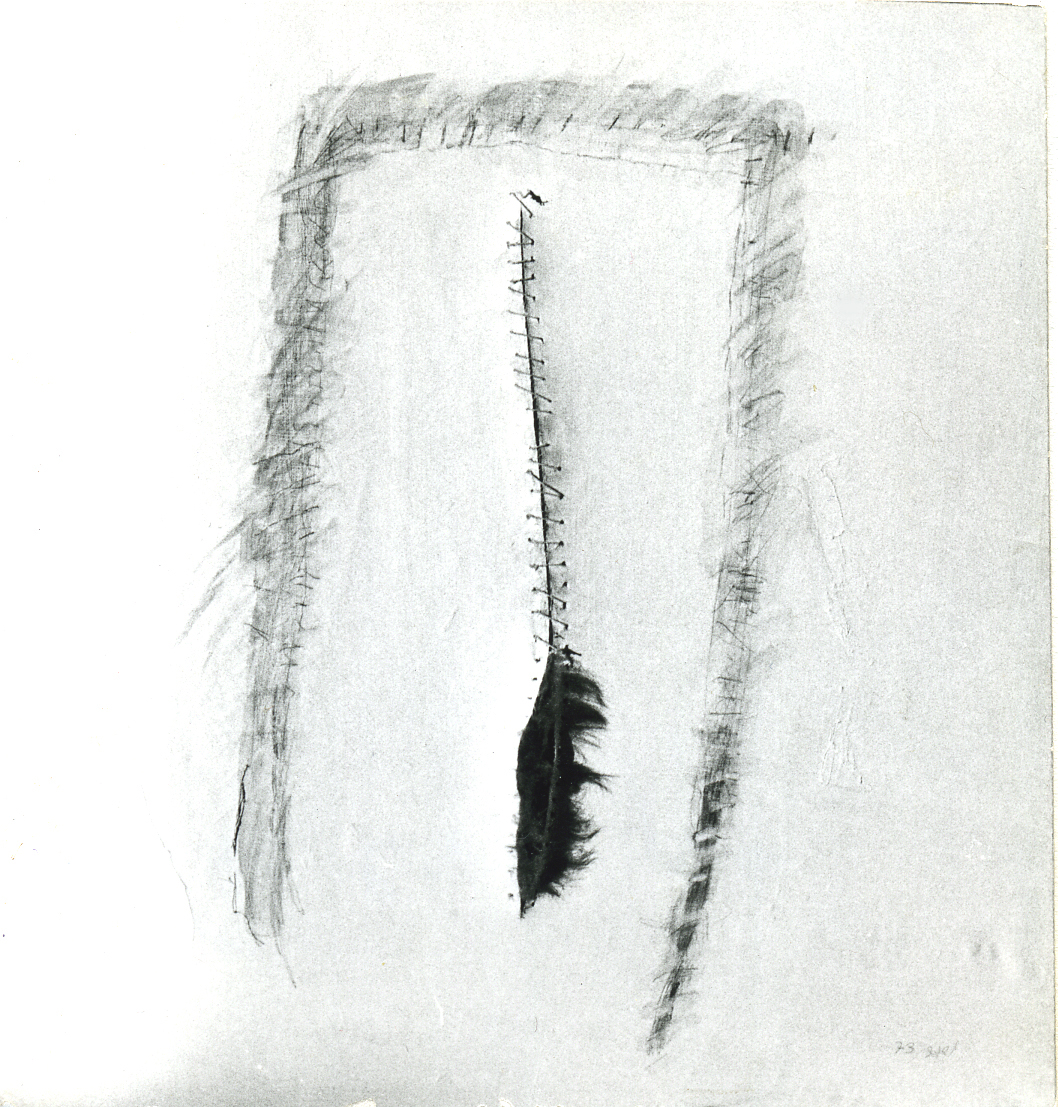
1973, Stitch with Feather. Thread, acrylic, pencil on linen. Private Collection

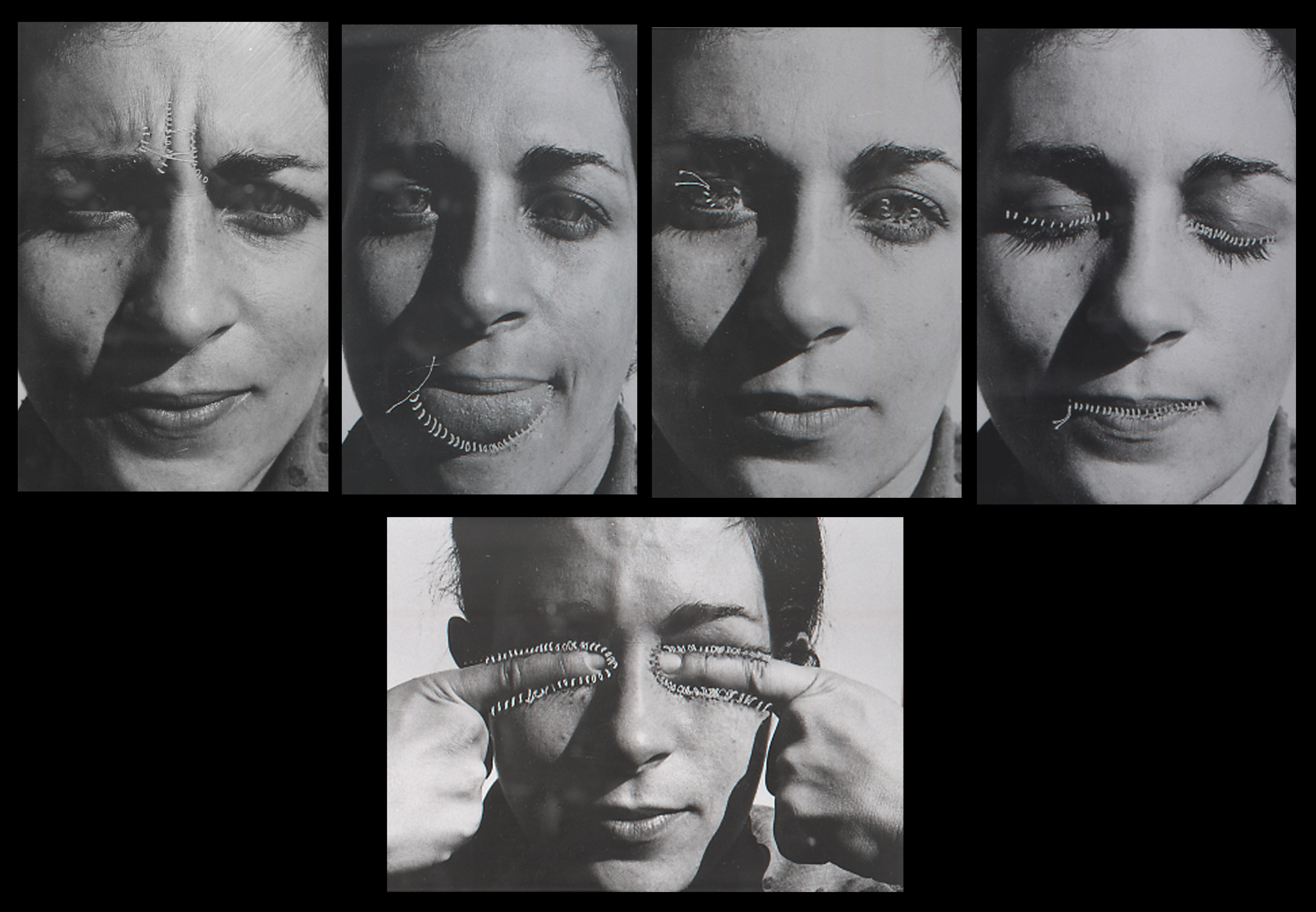
1974, Stitched Faces. One Person Show at Debel Gallery in Jerusalem. Stitched and rephotographed photographs. Collection: Haifa Museum of Art

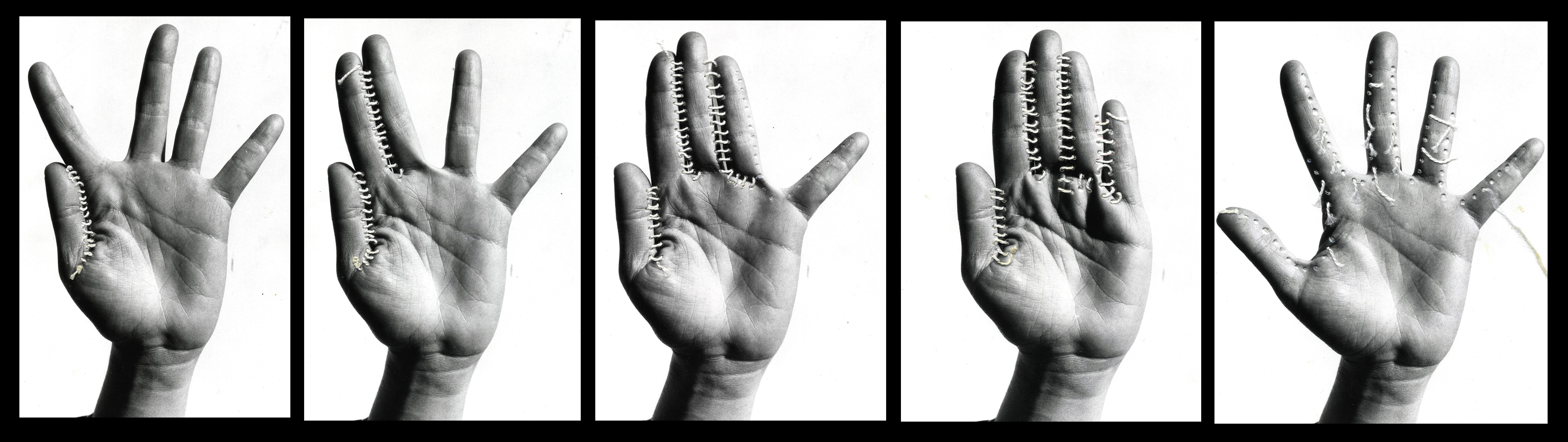
1974, Stitched Hands. One Person Show at Debel Gallery in Jerusalem. Stitched and rephotographed photographs. Collection: Tel-Aviv Museum of Art

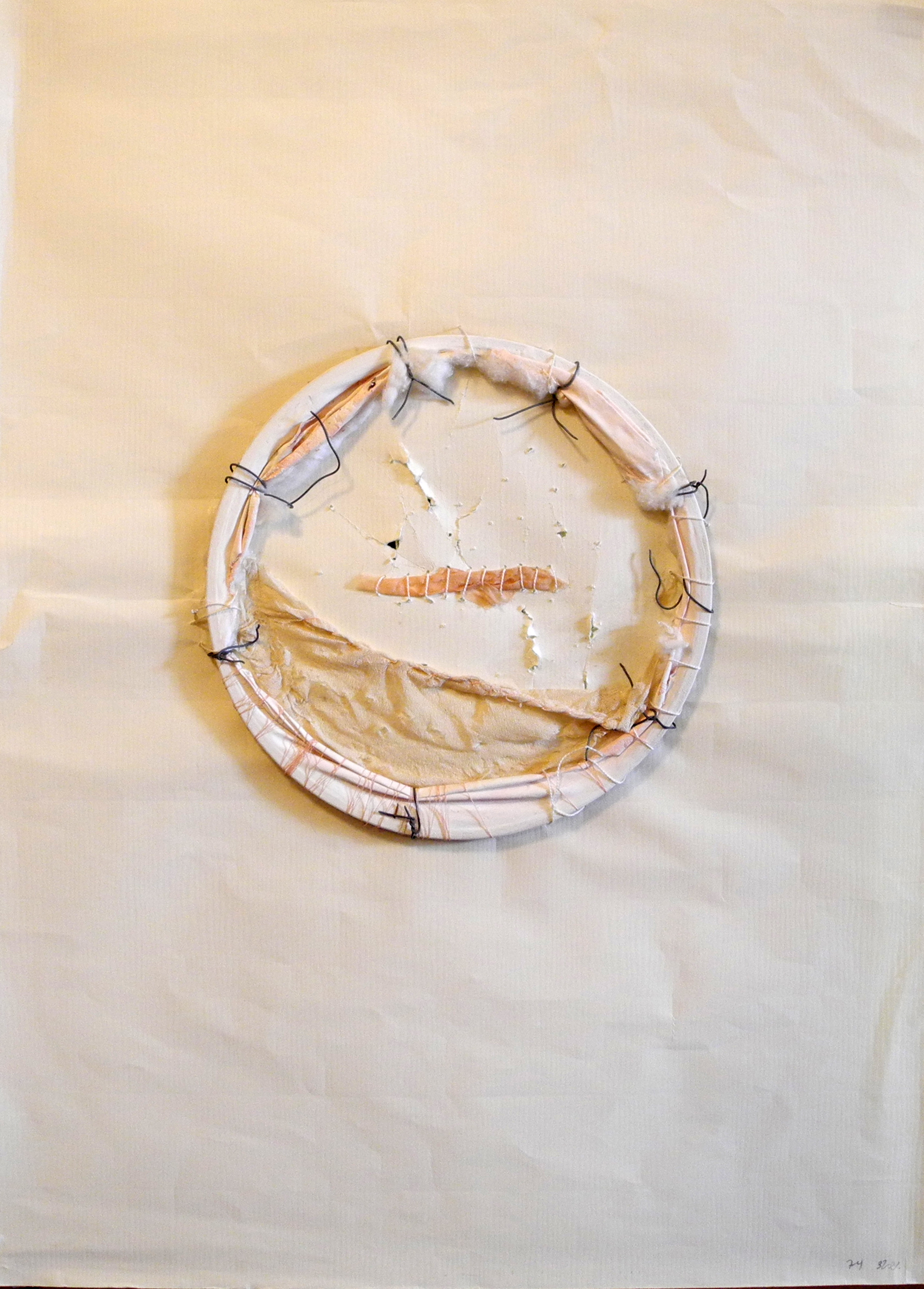
1974, One Person Show at Debel Gallery in Jerusalem. Mixed media on paper. Collection: Gordon Gallery

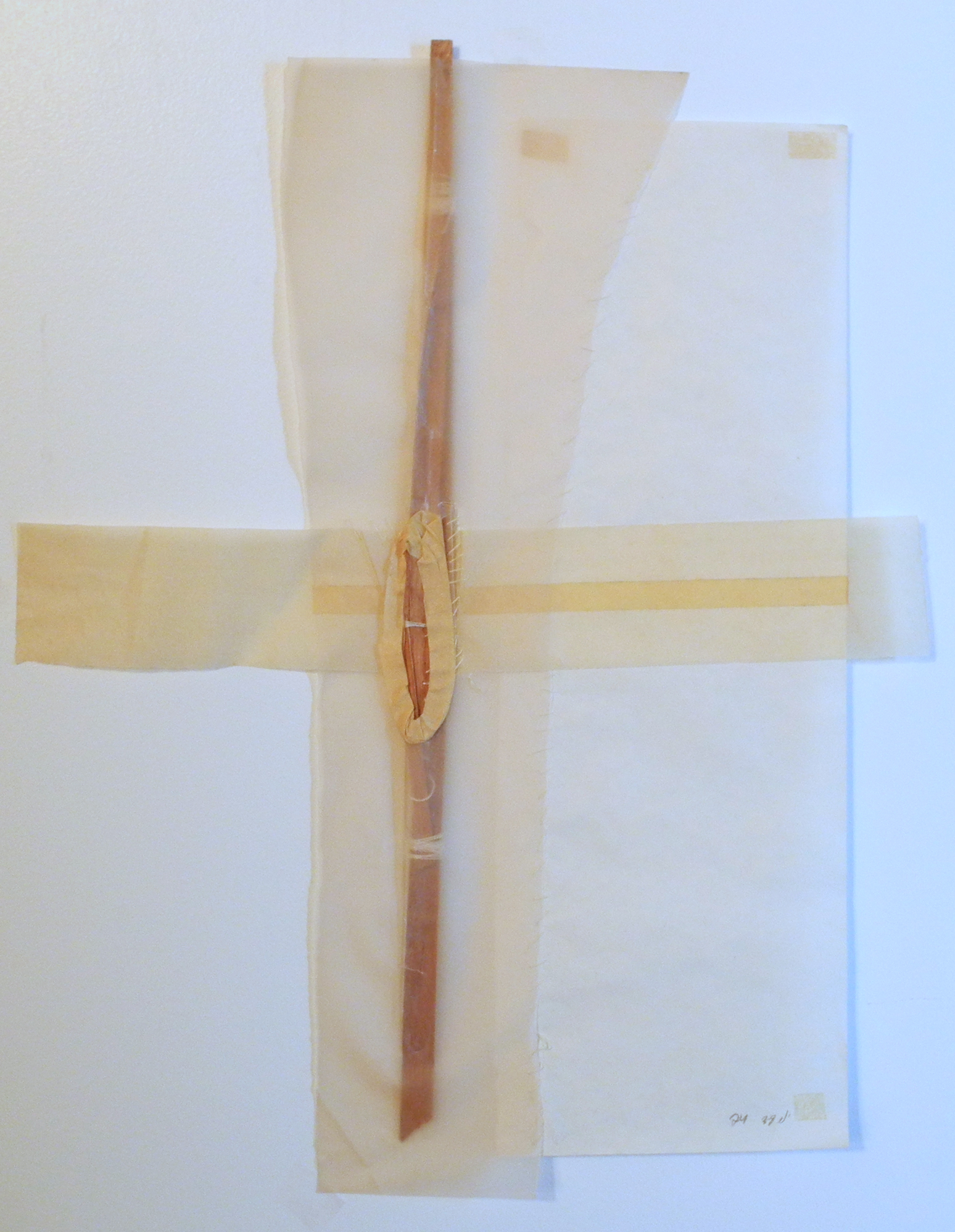
1974, One Person Show at Debel Gallery in Jerusalem. Mixed media on paper. Collection: Gordon Gallery

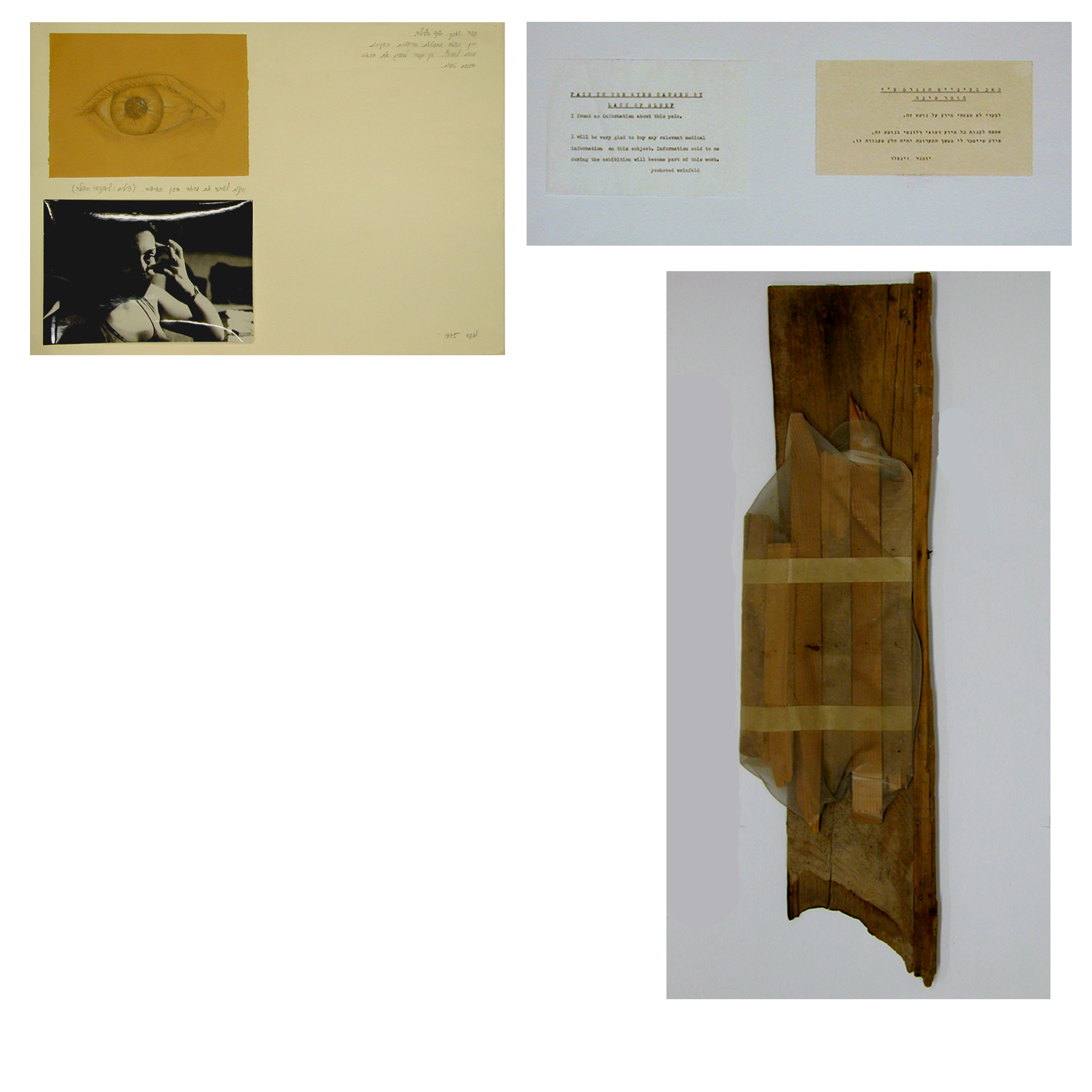
1975,"Pains" at Debel Gallery in Jerusalem. Pain in the Eyes. Mixed media. Collection: Haifa Museum of Art

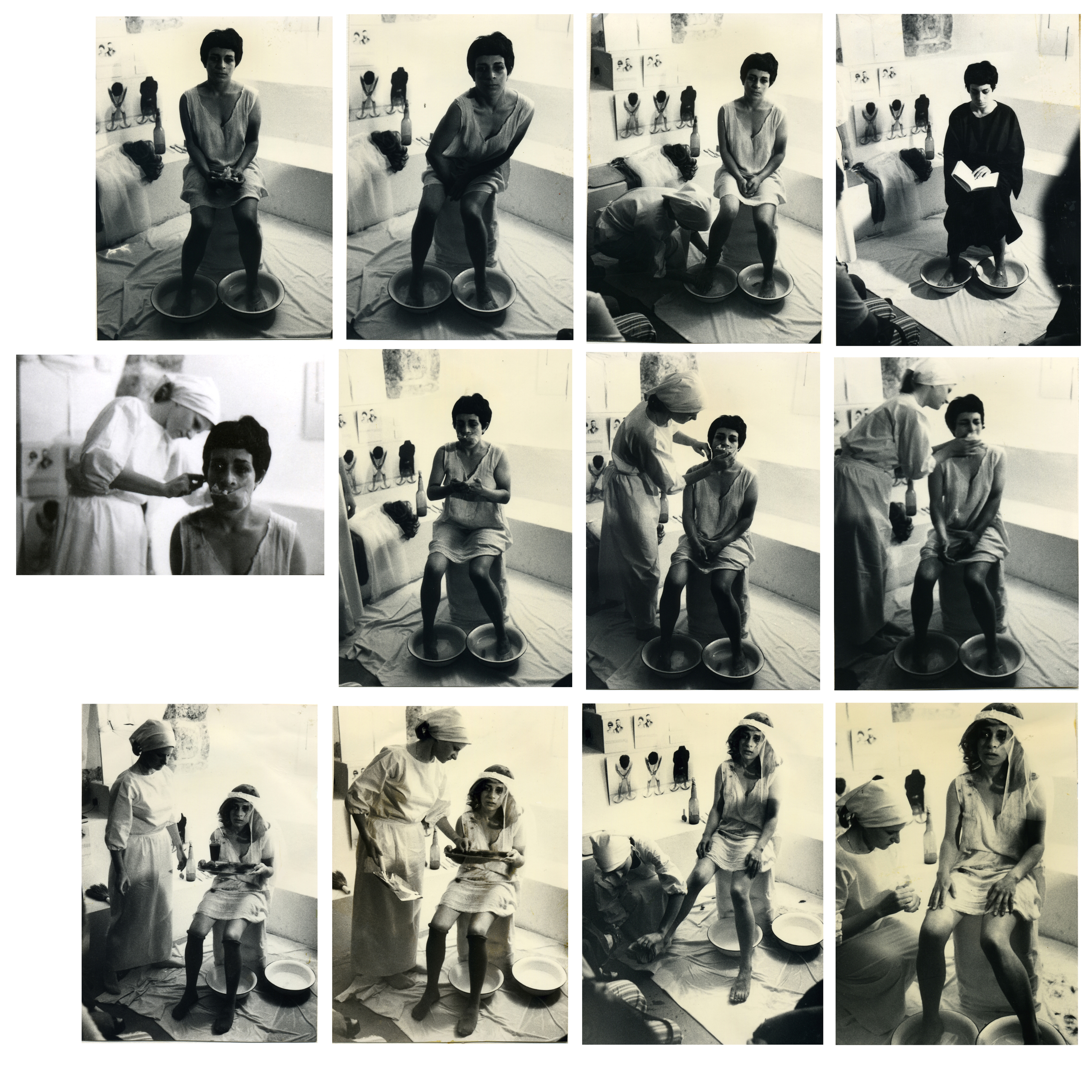
1976, Documentation of a Performance during a one-person show at Debel Gallery in Jerusalem. Photographs.

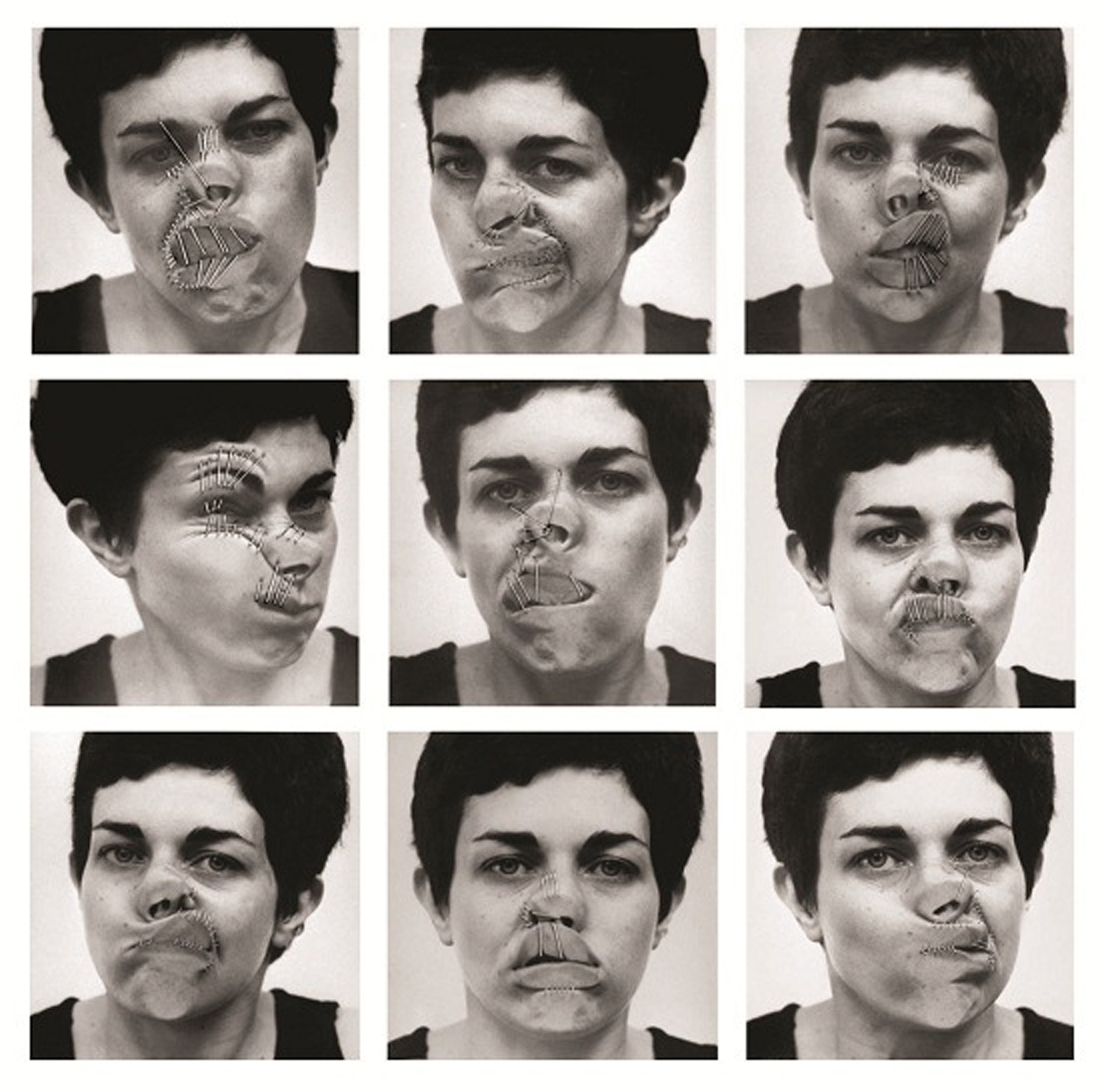
1976, Stitched Faces. One Person Show at Debel Gallery in Jerusalem. Stitched and rephotographed photographs. Collection: Gordon Gallery

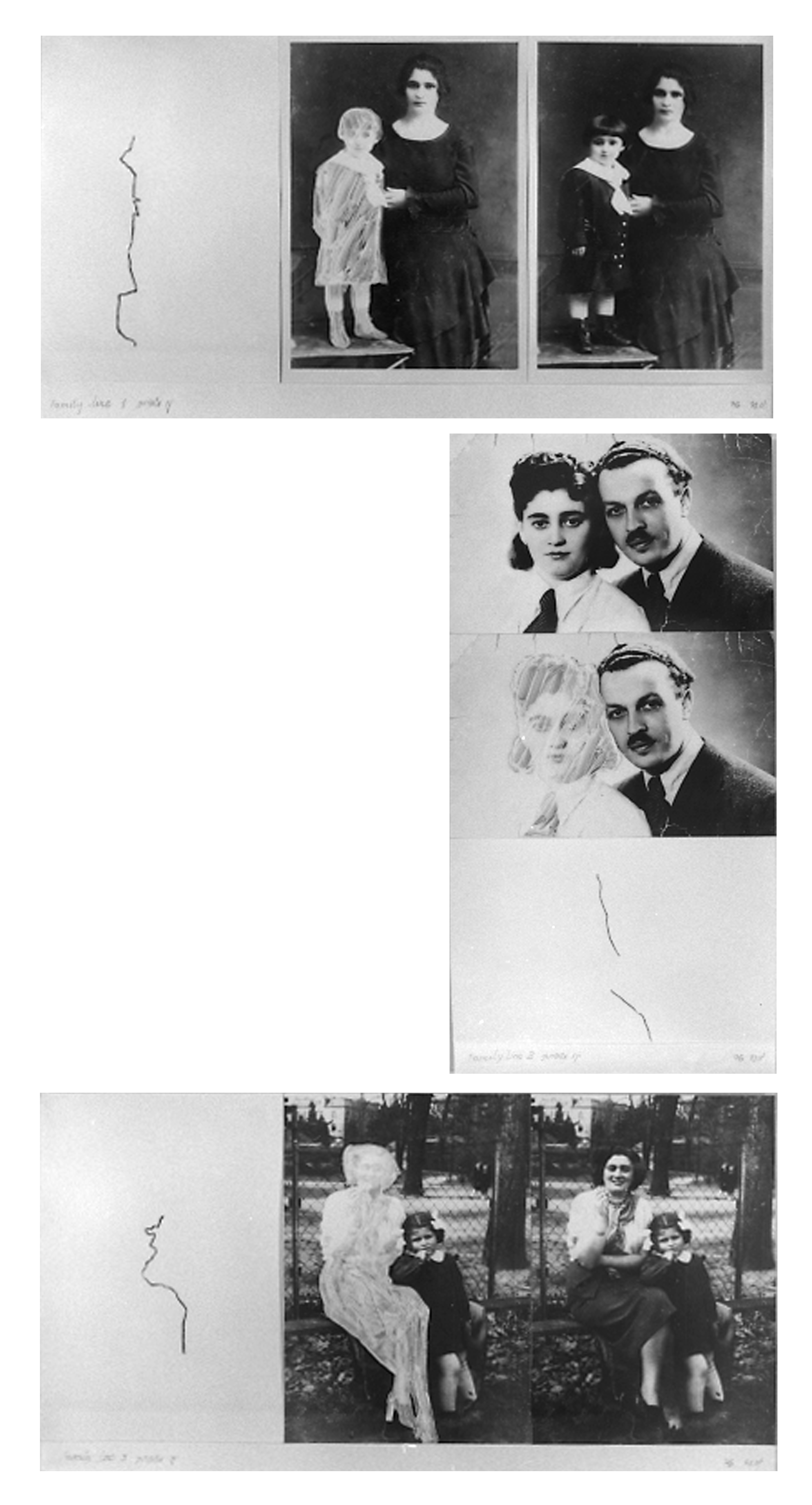
1976, Family Line. One Person Show at Debel Gallery in Jerusalem. Photographs, acrylic, pencil on paper

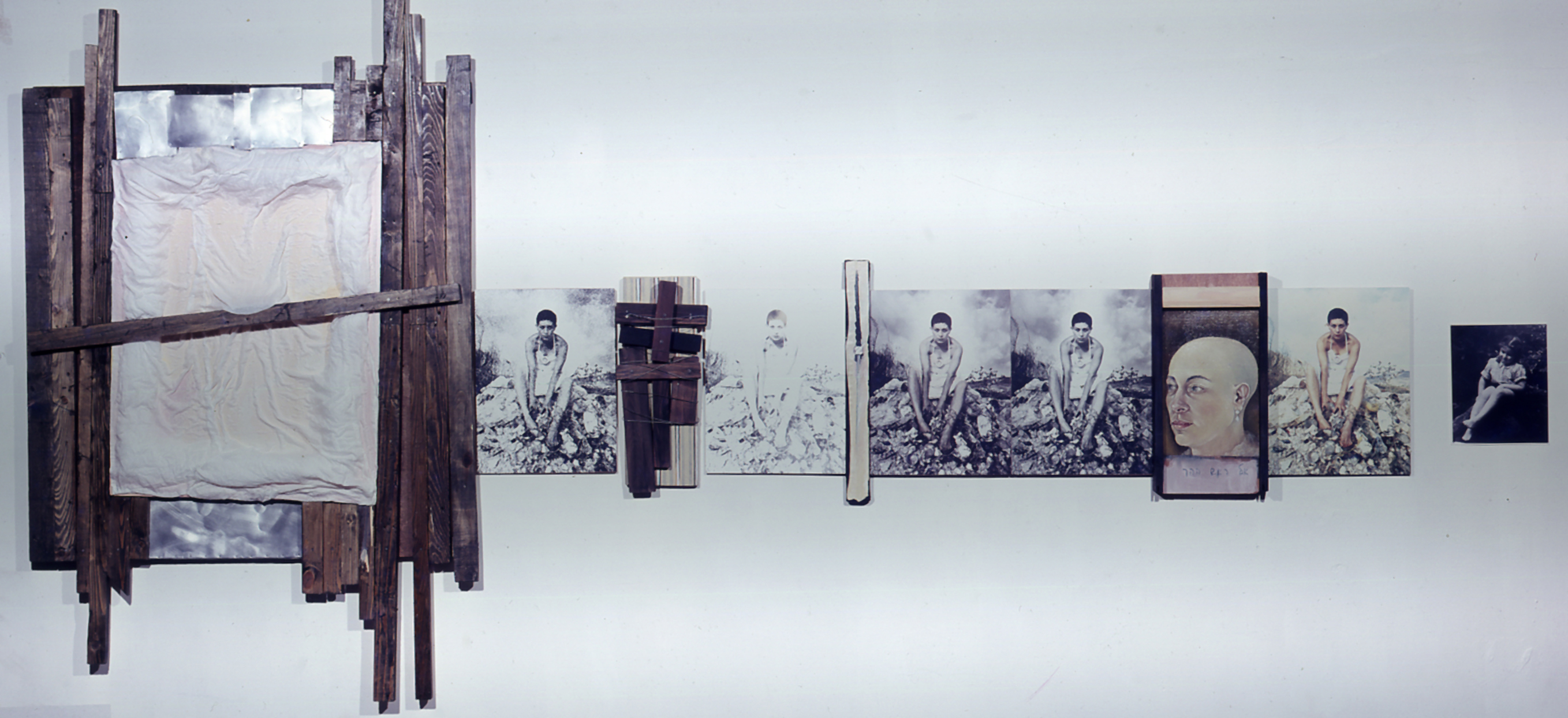
1979, Visual Images #8. Text: "In the concentration camps where all the Jews were dirty and hungry there were also beautiful women whom the Germans loved. So the women would beat Jews and get food. Now they are being punished. Their heads were shaven." One Person Show at the Israel Museum in Jerusalem. Mixed media. Collection: Israel Museum, Jerusalem

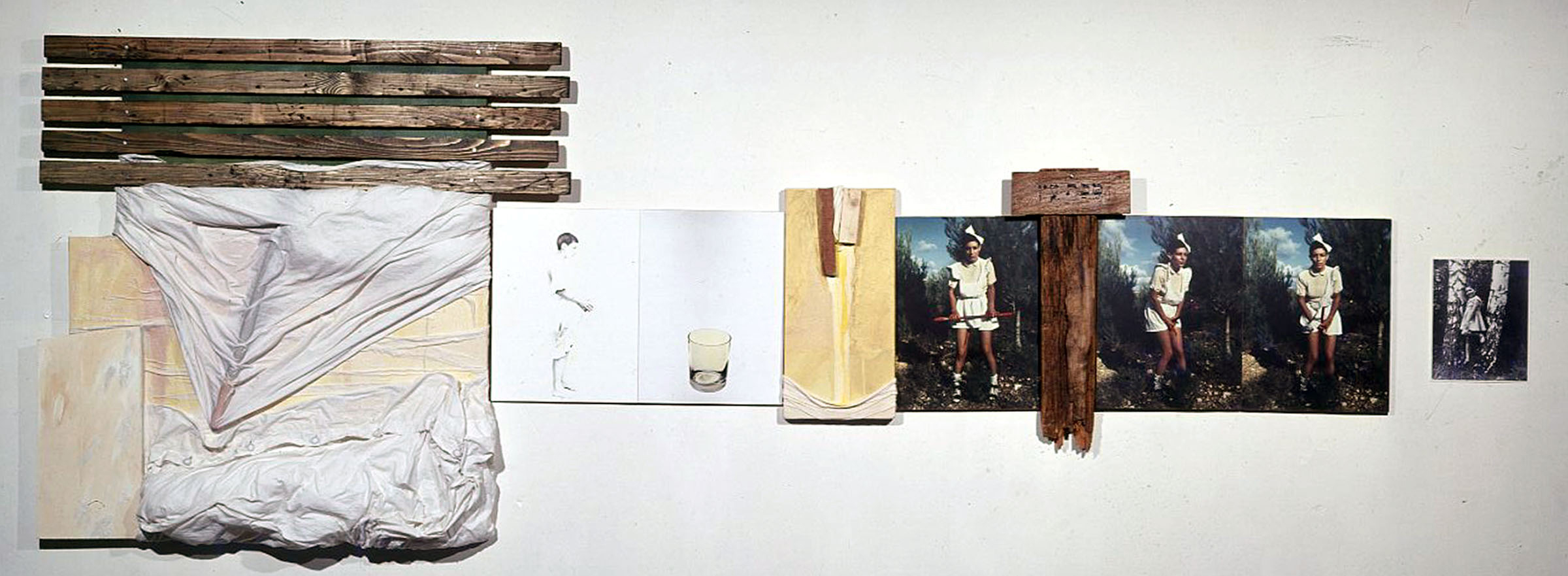
1979, Visual Images #7 (Mukkat Etz). Text: "Kazia and I are standing on the wooden veranda. Kazia sends me to buy cigarettes. Afterwards she gives me a puff and says, there was a girl in our village who played with a wooden stick between her legs and then blood came out I bleed from there every month. If a girl is pregnant a yellow juice comes out." Mixed media. One Person Show at the Israel Museum in Jerusalem. Private Collection

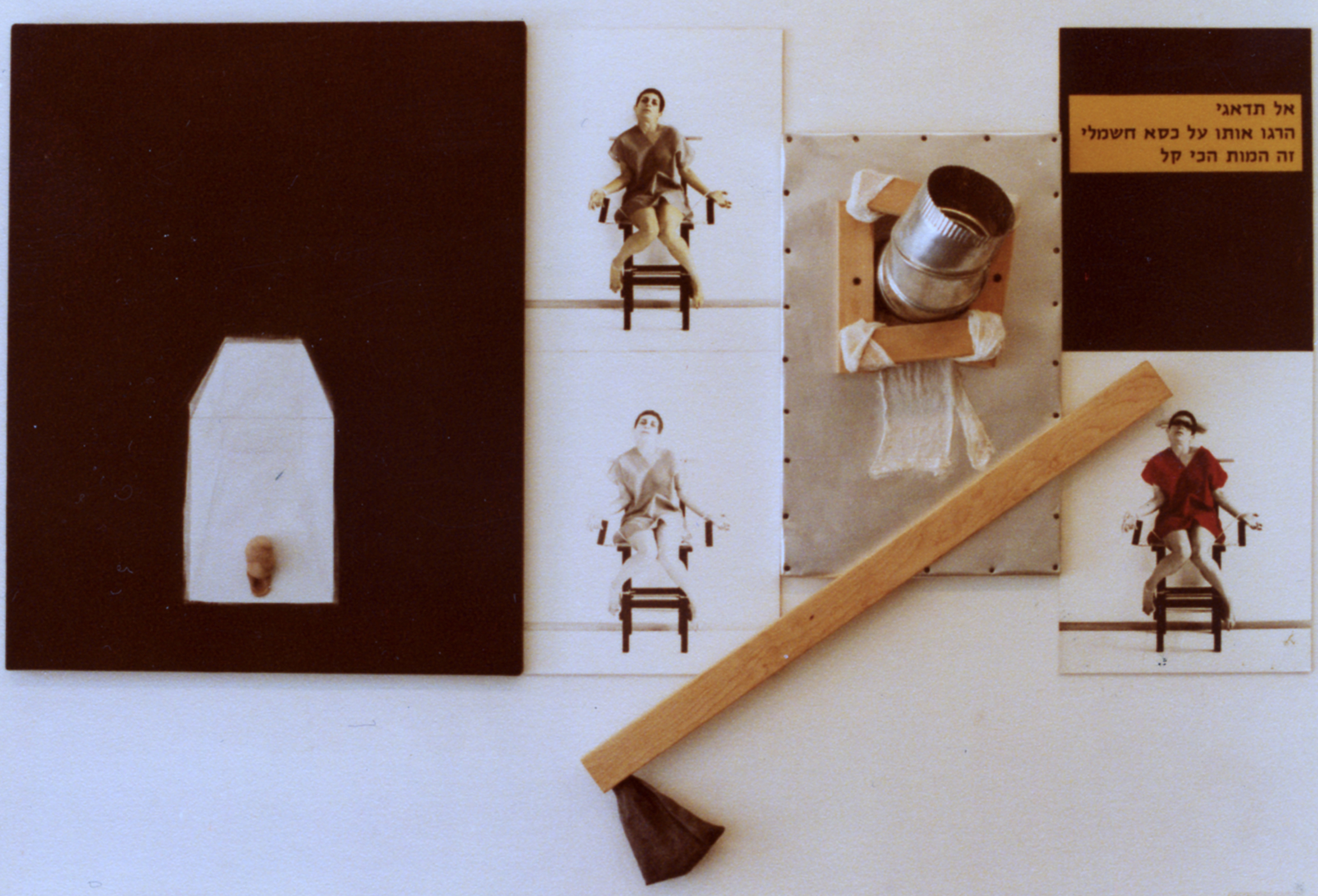
1980-81, Stories for Little Children. Text: "Don't worry they killed him on an electric chair it's the easiest death." One Person Show at the Gordon Gallery in Tel-Aviv. Artist's Collection

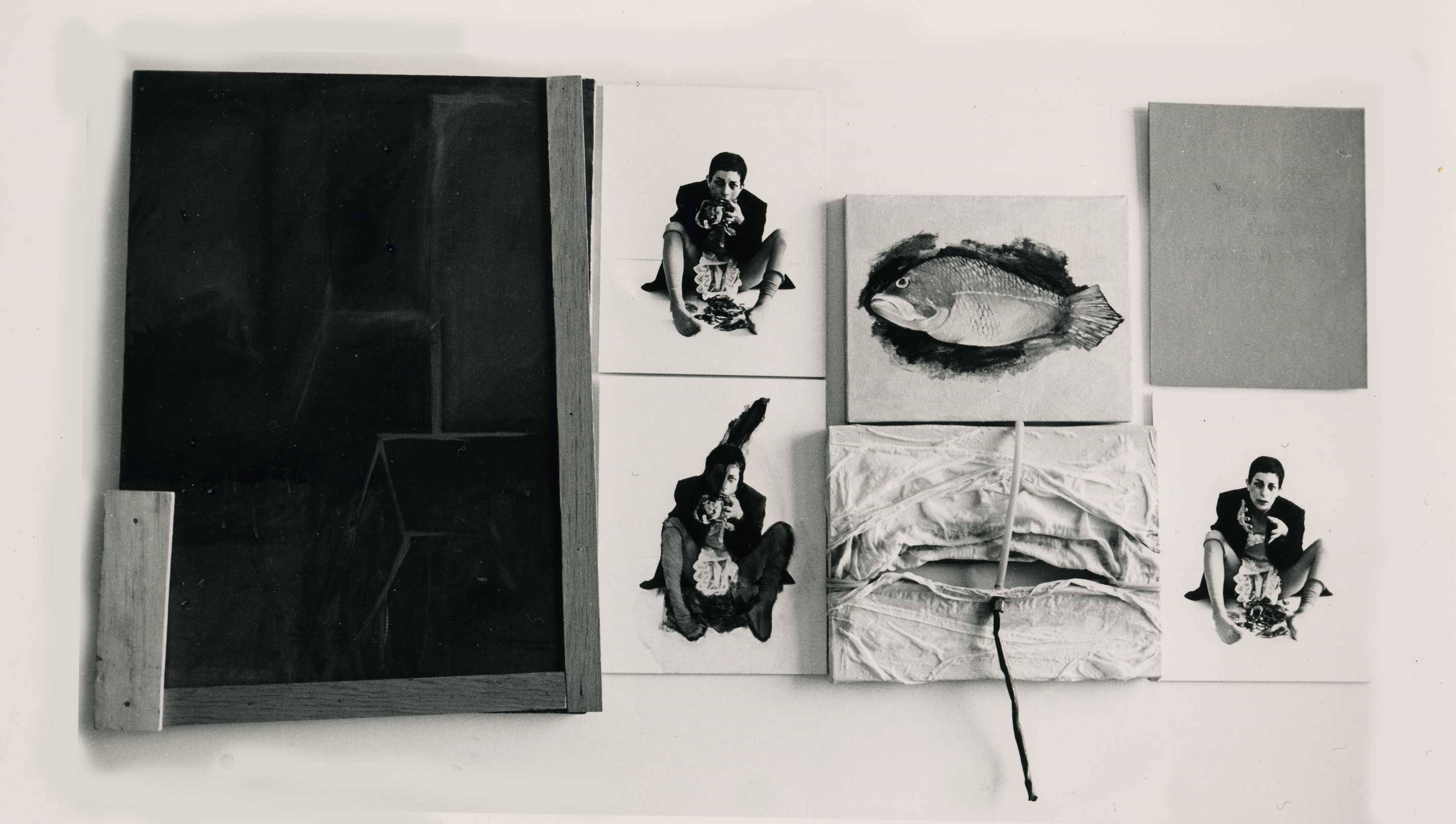
1980-81, Stories for Little Children. Text: "Eat eat in the war they even ate potato peels." One Person show at the Gordon Gallery in Tel-Aviv. Mixed media. Artist's Collection

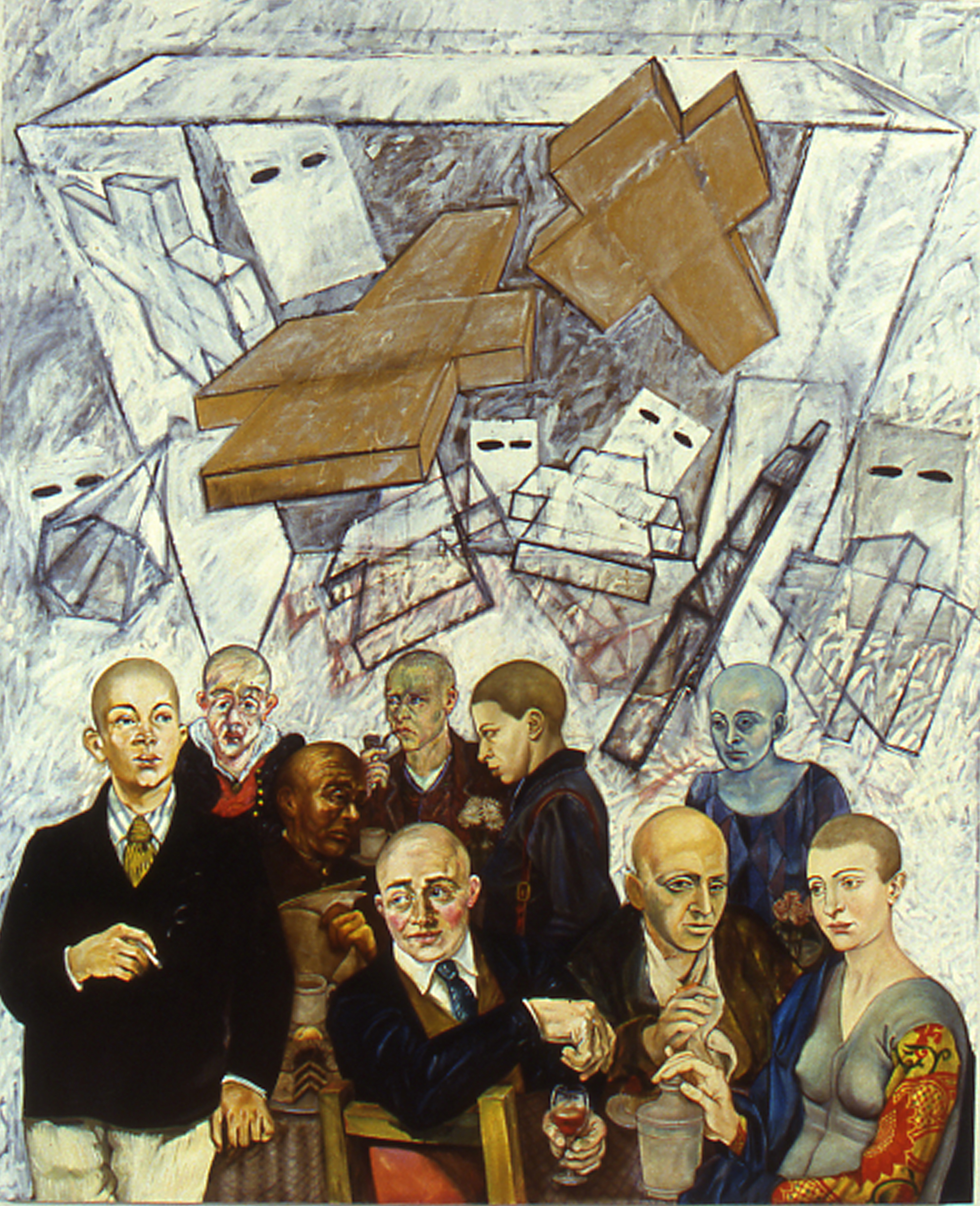
1983-84, Oil on linen. Collection of the Artist

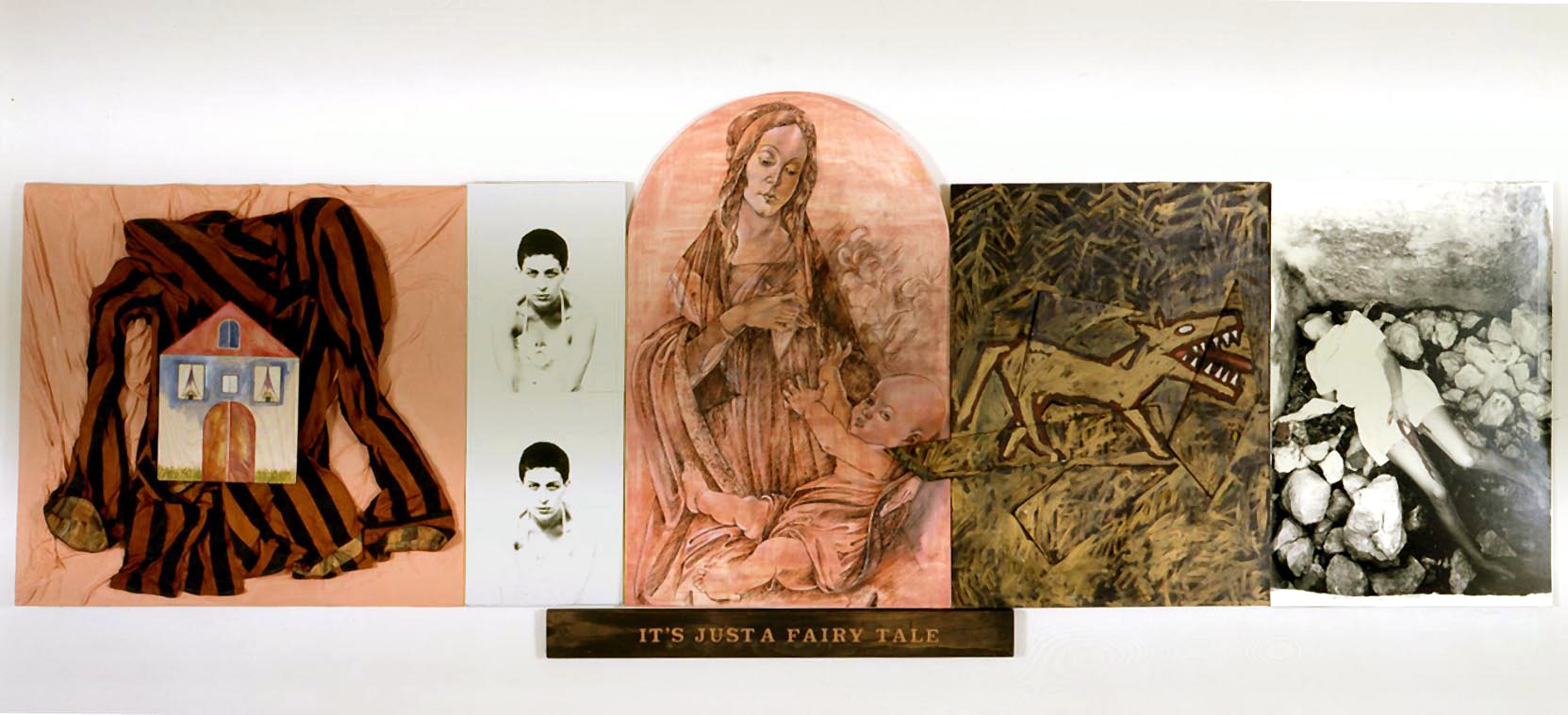
1988, Series: Mother's Cliches. Text: "You Will Always be my Baby." Mixed media. 1991, Bograshov Gallery, Tel-Aviv. Artist's Collection

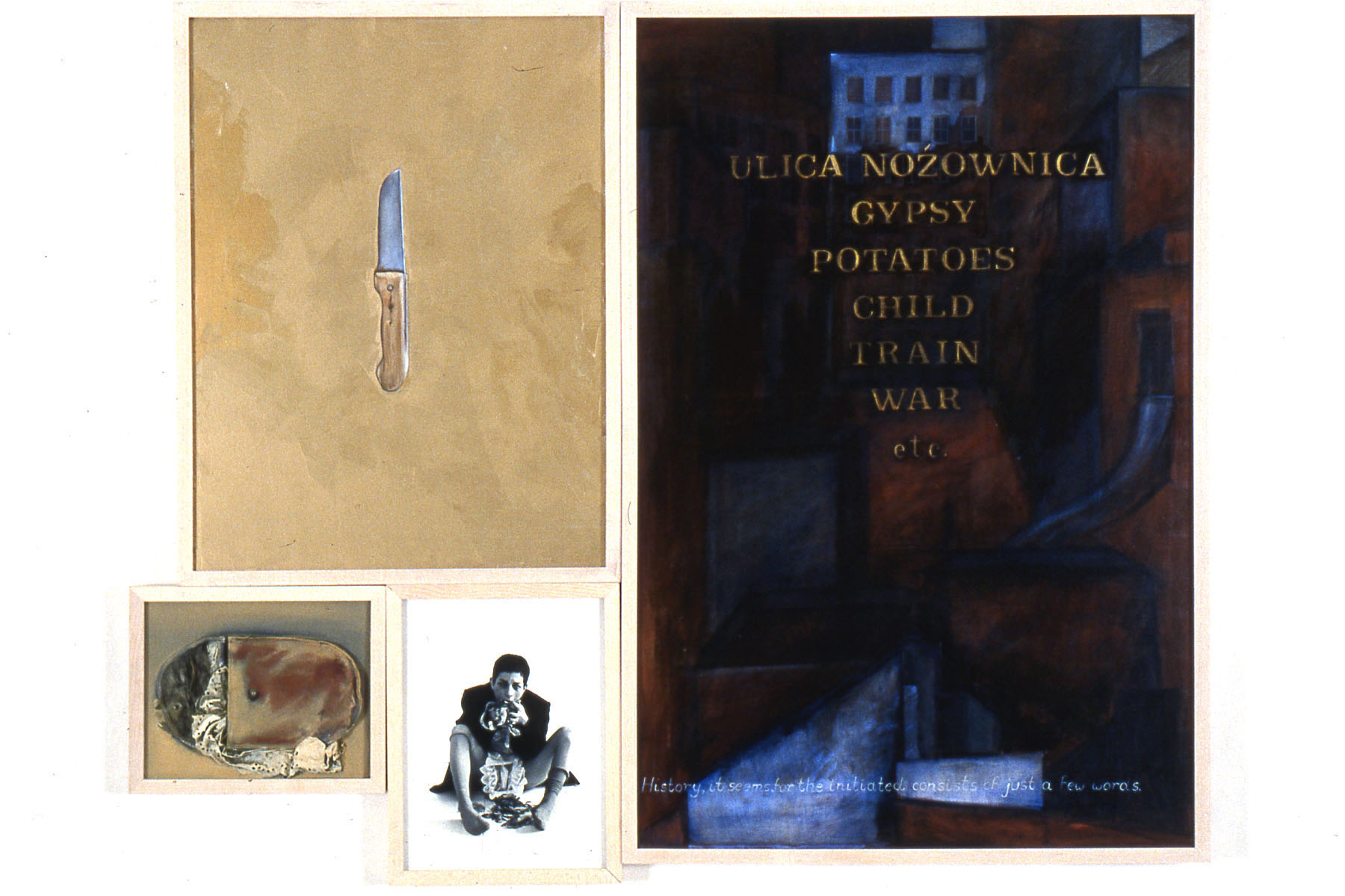
1990, Series: "For the initiated it seems history consists of just a few words". Mixed media. 1991, Bograshov Gallery, Tel-Aviv. Private Collection

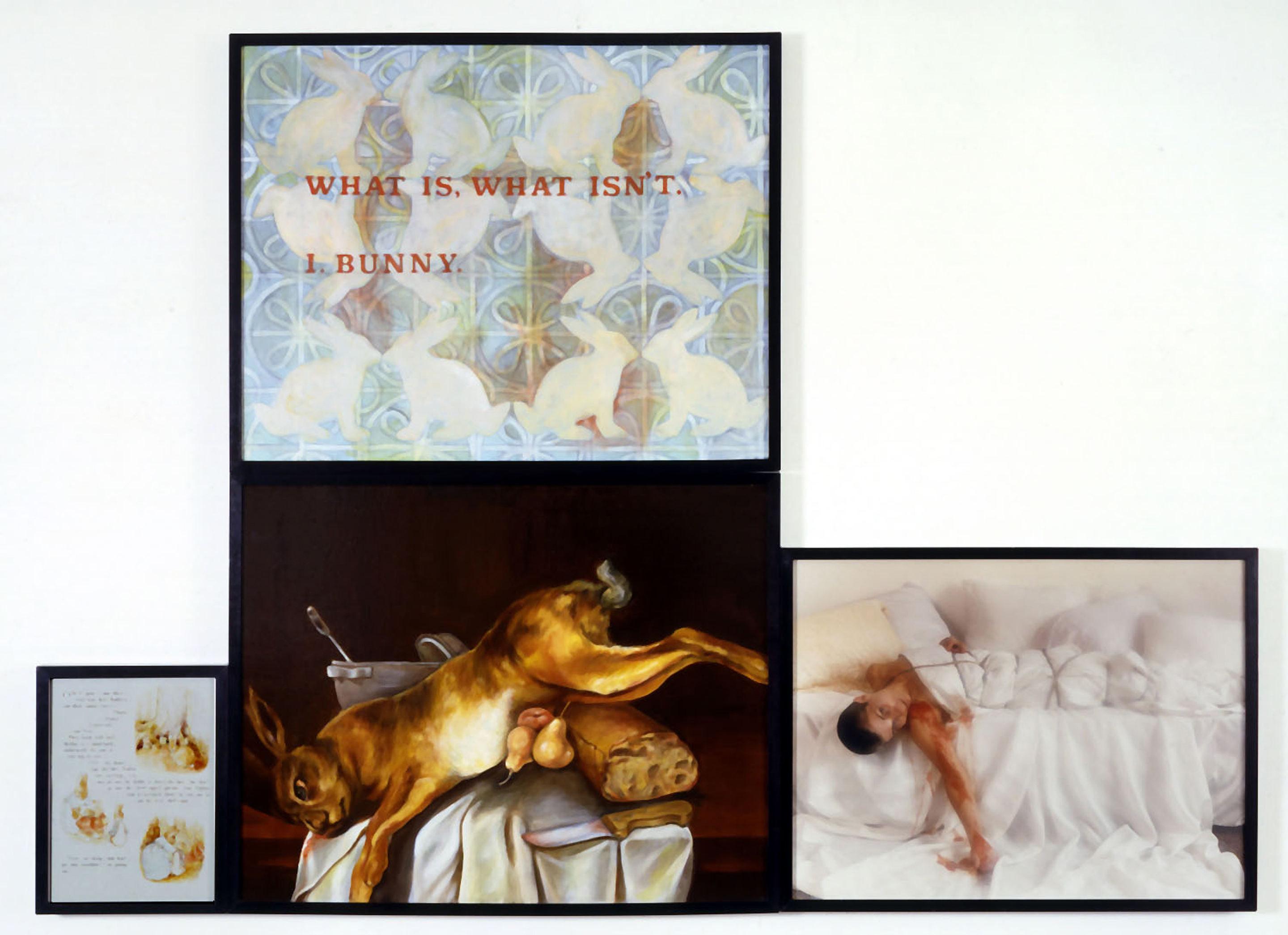
1993-94, Series: "What is What isn't. Bunny" Mixed media. Artist's Collection.
