= Debelle =

Debelle is a French surname. Notable people with the surname include:

- Alexandre Debelle (1805–1897), French painter, designer, and lithographer
- Anne Debelle, Princesse d'Essling (1802–1887), French courtier
- César Alexandre Debelle (1770–1826), French general
- Jean-François Joseph Debelle (1767–1802), French general and soldier
- Speech Debelle (born 1983), real name Corynne Elliot, British rapper

== See also ==
- DeBell
- Debel (disambiguation)
