= DeBell =

DeBell is a surname. Notable people with the surname include:

- Jimmy DeBell (born 1962), American former football official
- Kristine DeBell (born 1954), American actress

== See also ==
- Frederick Debell Bennett (1806-1859), English ship surgeon and biologist
- Debel (disambiguation)
- Debelle, surname
