= Naftali Bezem =

Israeli painter, muralist and sculptor (1924-2018)

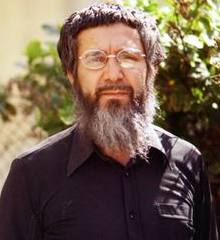
- Born: 27 November 1924
- Died: 2 October 2018 (aged 93); Tel Aviv
- Occupation: Painter

Naftali Wahba Bezem (Hebrew: נפתלי בזם; November 27, 1924 – October 2, 2018) was an Israeli painter, muralist and sculptor.

== Biography ==
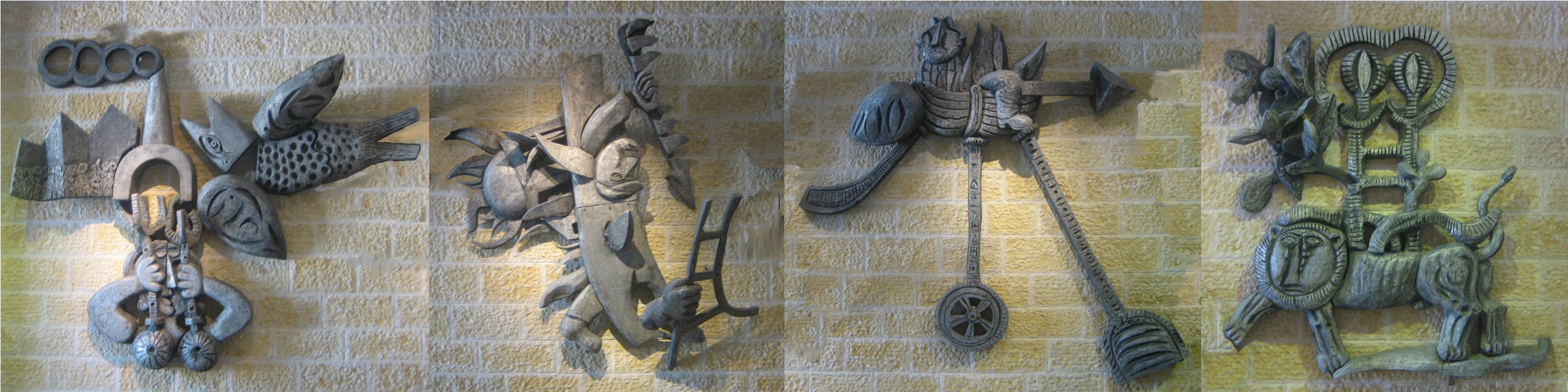
From Holocaust to Rebirth, a cast aluminum sculpture by Naftali Bezem, 1970, Yad Vashem, Jerusalem, Israel. From left to right, the four parts of the art are titled The Destruction, Resistance, Immigration to Israel and Rebirth.

Young Girl with a Flower, oil on canvas painting by Naftali Bezem, 1959, private collection

Naftali Bezem was born in Essen, Germany, in 1924. His early adolescence was spent under Nazi oppression, in constant fear for the safety of his parents, who were later murdered in Auschwitz concentration camp. Naftali immigrated to Mandate Palestine in 1939, at the age of fourteen, with a Youth Aliyah group. From 1943 to 1946, he studied art at the Bezalel Academy of Art and Design in Jerusalem with Israeli painter Mordecai Ardon. He then spent three years studying in Paris. Bezem's son Yitzhak was killed in the 1975 Zion Square refrigerator bombing in downtown Jerusalem.

== Art career ==
In addition to painting and sculpture, Bezem created murals, wall reliefs, tapestries, and stained glass windows. His most famous public works include a wall relief at Yad Vashem in Jerusalem and the ceiling mural in the main reception room at the President's Residence, Jerusalem.

== Awards and recognition ==
- In 1957, Bezem was a co-recipient of the Dizengoff Prize for Painting.

== See also ==
- Israeli art
