= Maya Cohen Levy =

Israeli painter and sculptor

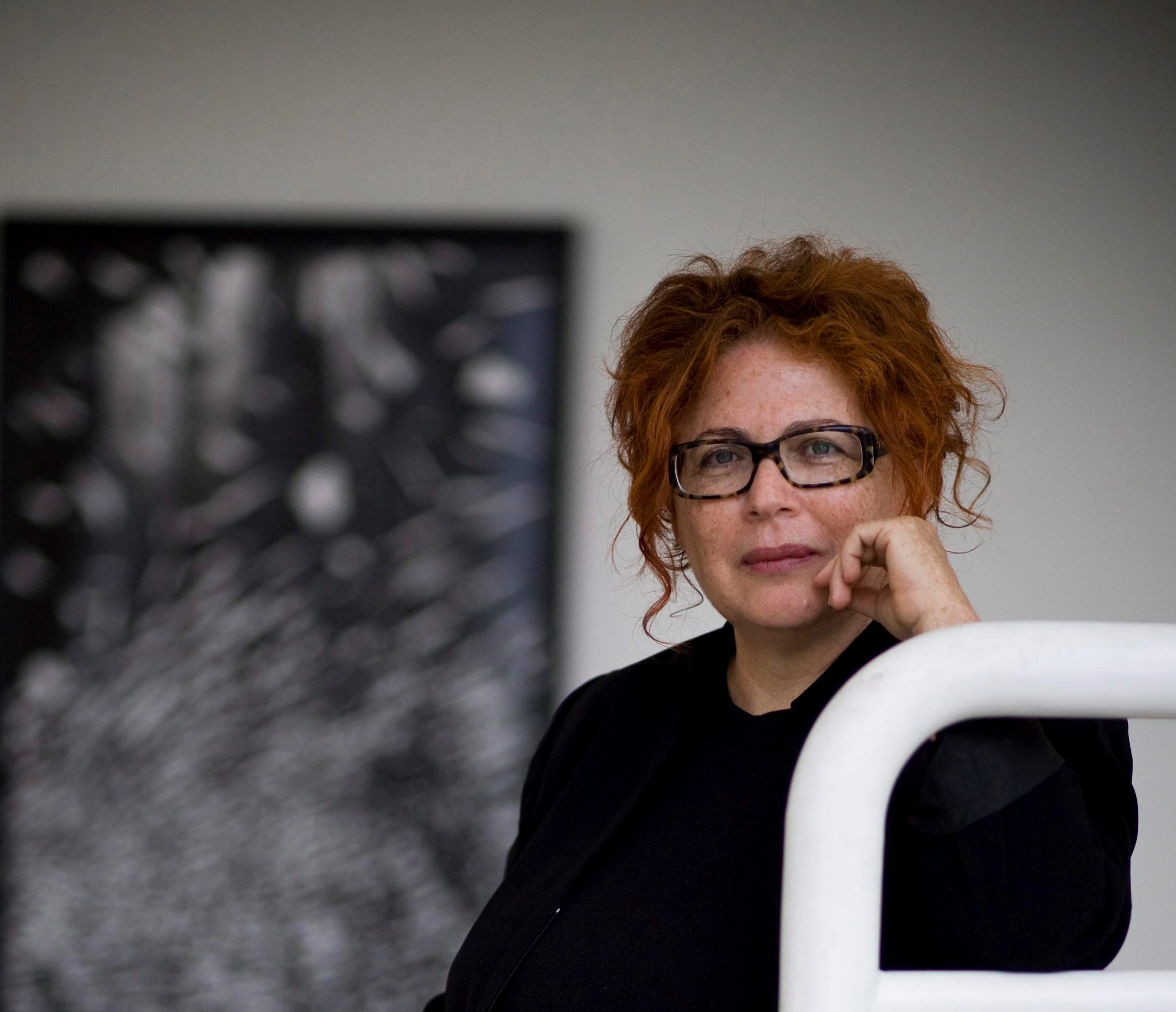
Maya Cohen Levy

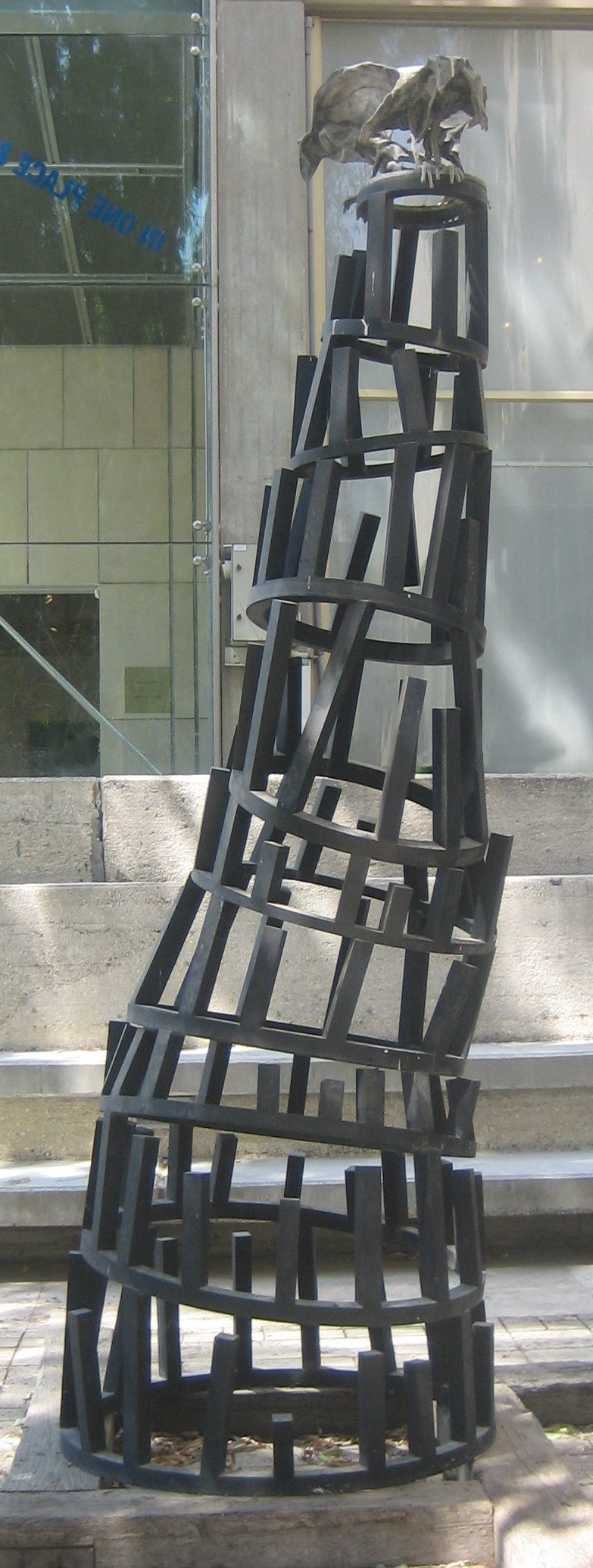
A Journey in the Wake of the Crow, railroad ties and painted aluminum sculpture by Maya Cohen Levy, 1990, Tel Aviv Museum of Art, Tel Aviv, Israel.

Maya Cohen Levy (Hebrew: מאיה כהן לוי; born 1955), also known as Maya Cohen-Levy, is an Israeli painter and sculptor.

== Life and work ==
Maya Cohen Levy was born in Tel Aviv. She studied philosophy at Tel Aviv University from 1973 to 1974. From 1975 to 1979, she pursued advanced studies at the High School for Art in Tel Aviv. In 1983, she went to Japan to study calligraphy and sumi-e painting.

Heavily pregnant in 1984, she was told by a senior artist in the Kalisher School of Art, "You'll never be an artist now." She said this made her feel terrible, but also strengthened: "We were operating in a male environment, in a culture that believed that the great artists are men. It doesn't matter what your feminist views were, in the end you were left with that. The way to success was to adopt that attitude and not to be a mother. Women who wanted to enter the field had to be like that." In the 1980s, after gaining a stipend to work at a center in the United States, she said that she would attend with her daughter, and was sent rules, which included "no children or pets".

She initially believed that she had to make the choice between motherhood and a career as an artist, but became one of the few women artists at that time who decided that motherhood was compatible with being an artist. Women artists of the previous generation had either chosen not to have children, or left children with others to look after, such as Lea Nikel, whose daughter lived in a kibbutz. Very few women were art school teachers and those who were did not have children.

1994-5, she studied calligraphy in Beijing, China. In 2000, she had an exhibition Ponds 1995-2000, sponsored by The Nelford Foundation, at Tel Aviv Museum of Art. The paintings used the theme of ponds in various forms.

In 2002, she was one of the 10 Israeli artists invited to participate in the first seminar of Ma'aseh Hoshev (Informed Creations), under the auspice of the Schechter Institute for Jewish Studies (SIJS). The aim of the project was to connect Talmudic knowledge with artistic creation. Levy's contribution addressed the Israel-Palestinian conflict with the superimposition of a text from the bible onto the statement made by an arrested Palestinian man.

Roots, oil on canvas painting by Maya Cohen Levy, 2002, private collection.

In 2006, her painting Roots (right) was sold at Sotheby's, whose catalogue notes said:

The densely worked brush strokes of Cohen Levy's paintings refer to the organic and the geometric but are influenced by Islamic ornamentation as well as the American Abstract Expressionist movement.

She had painted other works with the same title 2000–2002.

The characteristic of her work is a complexity of paint streaks, which have used organic images such as the honeycomb, the palm tree and the sunflower, where her discovery of the golden spiral organisation of the plant's seeds led to an exploration of the Islamic tradition, which counterbalanced her initial influence from Abstract Expressionism and resulted in depictions of upside-down trees, whose branches thus appear to be roots.

Her work includes paintings, sculptures, installations and books in collaboration with writers and poets. She has taught for 25 years in schools including Bezalel Art Academy in Jerusalem and the Kalisher Art School in Tel Aviv.

Levy lives in Tel Aviv.

== Exhibitions ==
- Tel Aviv Museum of Art
- Israel Art Museum in Jerusalem

== Awards ==
- Ministry of Culture and Education in Israel
- Dan Sandel Sculpture Award in the Tel Aviv Museum of Art
- The Painting Award of the Israel Art Museum in Jerusalem

== Collections ==
- Tel Aviv Museum
- The Jewish Museum, New York
