= Etienne Debel =

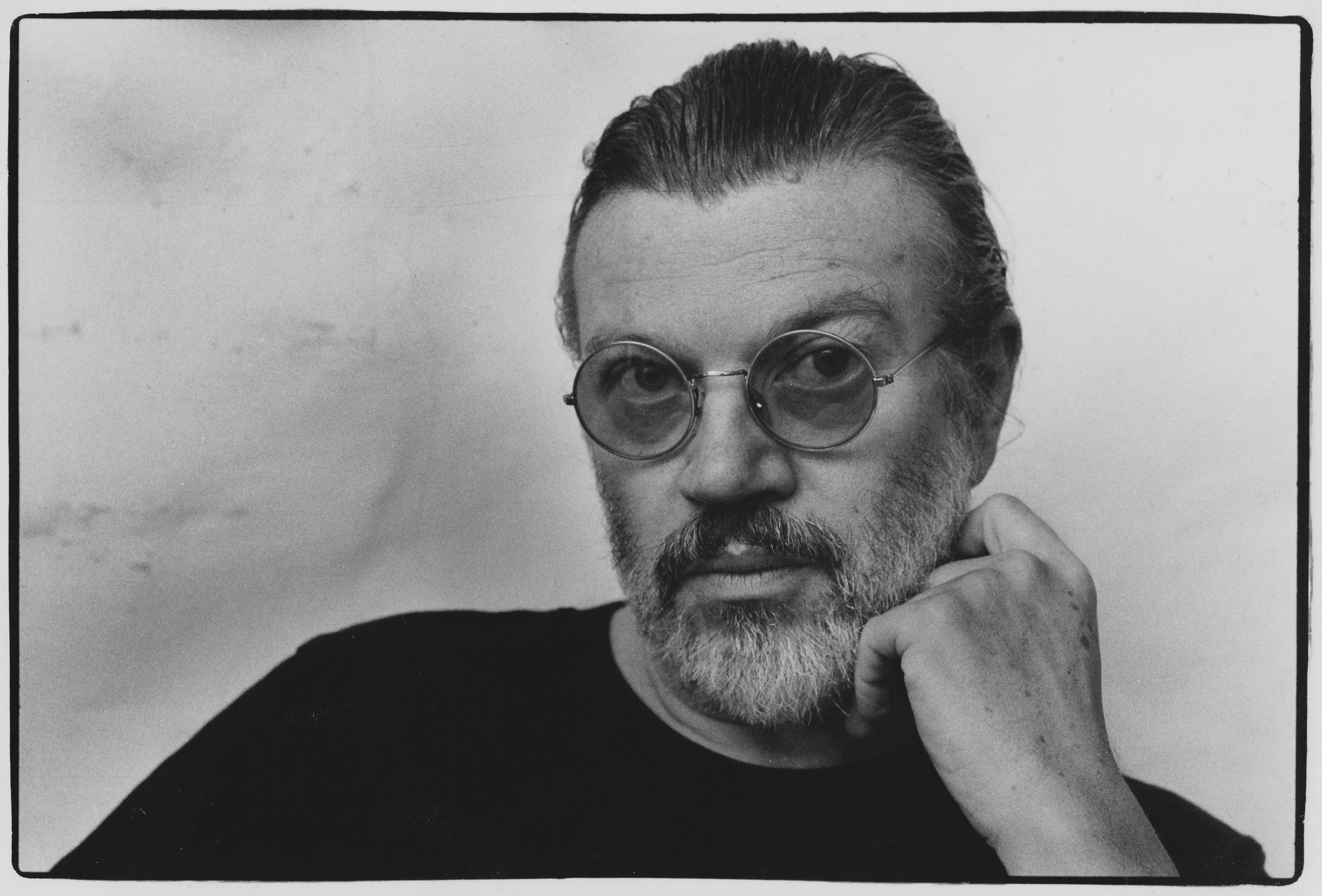
- Born: 21 November 1931; Izegem, Flanders, Belgium
- Died: 19 May 1993 (aged 61); Jerusalem, Israel
- Occupation(s): Actor, director, set designer, playwright, and translator
- Spouse: Ruth Debel (m. 1964)

Etienne Debel (English: /eɪˈtjɛn ˈdɛbɛl/; 21 November 1931 – 19 May 1993) was a Flemish-born theatre, television and movie actor and director, set designer, playwright, translator and a co-founder and co-owner of the Debel Gallery in Jerusalem, Israel alongside his wife Ruth Debel.

== Life ==
=== Youth and early days ===
Etienne Debel was born in Izegem, a small city in the Flemish part of Belgium. Etienne went to a Catholic school and was destined by his parents to be a priest. at the age of 16 with the support of a priest-teacher who understood him and persuaded his parents, Etienne moved to a drama school in Ghent and graduated summa cum laude from a drama academy in Antwerp. For a while after his graduation Etienne played lead roles in a local theatre.

At the age of 23 Etienne Debel founded his own theatre, Het Vlaamse Schouwtoneel (The Flemish Theatre) in the city of Brussels. Etienne funded the theatre with his own money. Etienne was influenced by the works of Jean Vilar who founded The Théâtre National Populaire (People's National Theatre) in France and like Vilar, Etienne wanted to take theatre out of the big city. Etienne traveled with his actors throughout Flanders in a pickup truck. Before every play Etienne published a brochure under the name Dialoog (Dialog). After the plays there were discussions with the public. Etienne's repertoire included classic plays from Ancient Greece to Shakespeare and Kleist as well as contemporary plays written by Belgian and non-Belgian authors. In 1962 Debel was forced to shut down his theatre for economic reasons and started working as a director for Flemish TV.

== See also ==
- Debel Gallery
