= Itten =

Itten is a Swiss surname. Notable people with the surname include:

- Cedric Itten (born 1996), Swiss footballer
- Johannes Itten (1888–1967), Swiss expressionist painter, designer, teacher, and writer
