= Café Kassit =

Café in Tel Aviv, Israel

Coordinates: 32.08°N 34.77°E

- Interactive map of Café Kassit

Restaurant information
- Established: 1935
- Closed: 2014
- Location: 117 Dizengoff Street (originally 59 Ben Yehuda Street), Tel Aviv, Israel

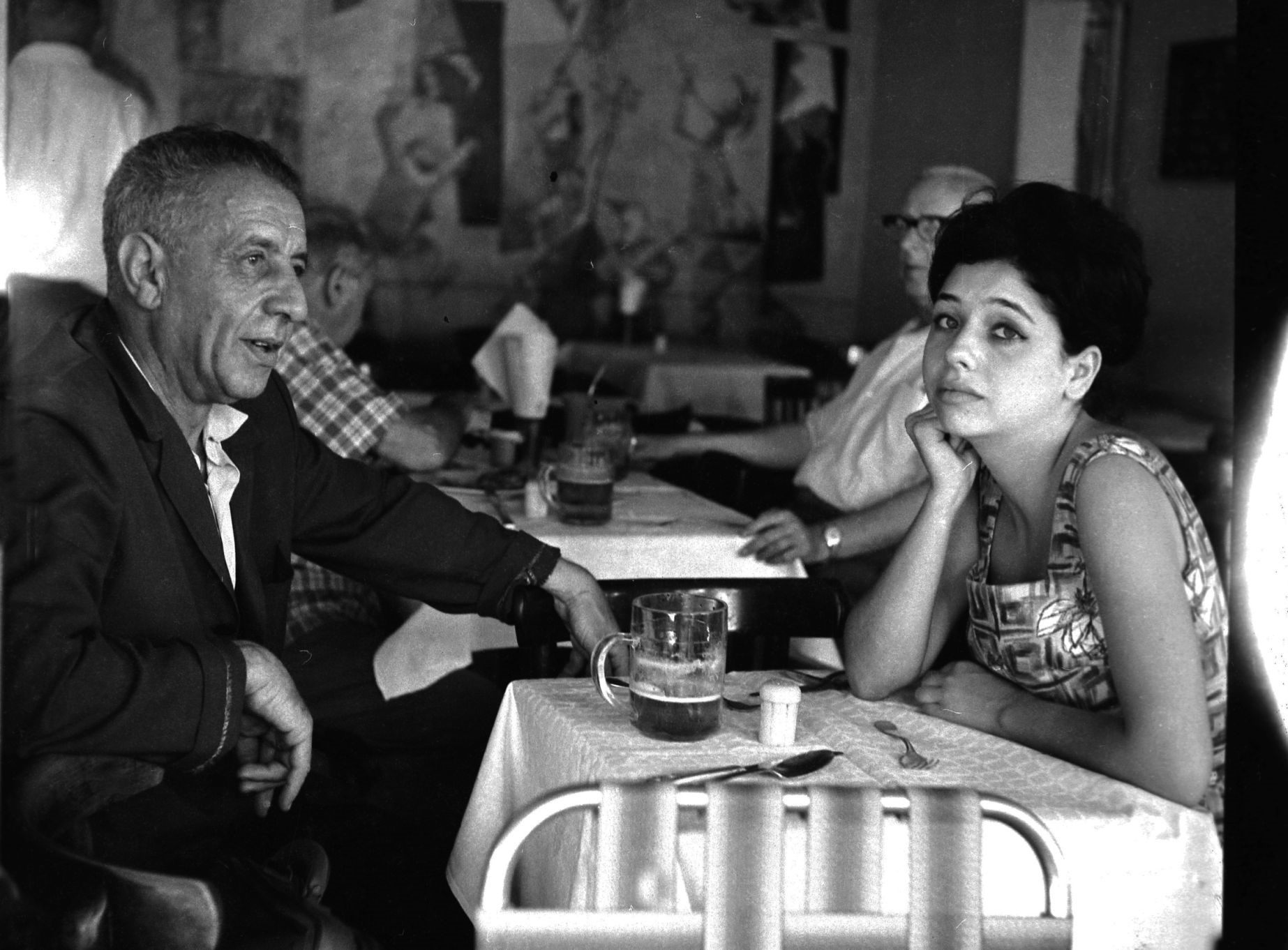
Nathan Alterman and his daughter Tirtza Atar, in Kassit

Café Kassit (Hebrew: כסית) was a café located in Tel Aviv from 1935 to 2014, initially on 59 Ben Yehuda Street. After a few years, it moved to 117 Dizengoff Street.

== History ==
The cafe was established in 1935 by Yechezkel Weinstein (Known afterwards as Hezkl Ish Kasit, "Hezkl, Kassit man"). Among its notabble customers was the painter Isaac Frenkel Frenel, the architect Yaakov Rechter, the poets Natan Alterman, Avraham Shlonsky, Leah Goldberg, Alexander Penn; the actress Hanna Rovina; the musicians Arik Einstein and Uri Zohar and more. In the 1950s, Gabriel Moked recounted that there was a special section reserved in the cafe for the "Kassit parliament".

The cafe's peak in importance was during the 1940s, 50s, and 60s of the 20th century. In the 1970s and 80s, its influence waned with the emergence of competing cafes such as "California" as well as the aging of the founders' of Kassit. In 1970, with the passing of Nathan Alterman, the coffeehouse closed its doors for two hours during his funeral. In 1979, Hatzkel died, and his widow Leah, along with her children Moshe Ish-Kasit and Tzvia Litman, continued to run the establishment. After her children died, Leah's son-in-law, Zev Litman, joined in the management of the cafe. Zev Litman died on December 13, 2007. During these times, Yankale Rotblit wrote the song "How to Make a Record," capturing the essence of the era.

=== The First Kassit ===
"Kassit HaRishon" (The First Kassit) was founded by Leova Goldberg, Hatzkel Ish Kasit, and Ilona Mordechovich in April 1935 at 59 Ben Yehuda Street. The name "Kassit" was given to the place by Abraham Shlonsky, named after a type of precious stone (kaseetah), which, according to Yalkut Shimoni, hints at Isaiah 41:1, "O you islands, listen to me, and pay attention, distant peoples." The place quickly became the stronghold of the literary group "Yahdav" which held discussions on cultural matters and held small theater shows. Artists such as Yitzhak Frenkel, Moshe Castel, and Arieh Navon also joined the group.

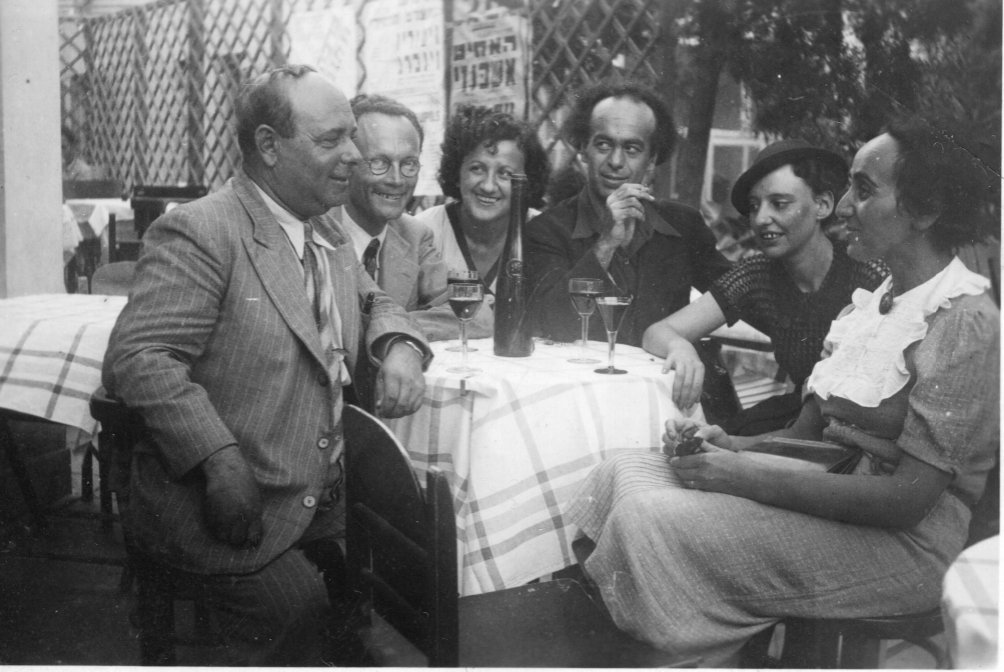
Yahdav at "Ararat", 1938

The partnership among the founders of "Kassit" dissolved in 1937. Leova Goldberg opened a new cafe called "Ararat - אררט in Hebrew" at 9 Ben Yehuda Street. The name "Ararat" was also bestowed by Shlonsky, signifying a place where they could be together, akin to Noah's Ark. The humorists of the time interpreted the name as an acronym for "Ani Rotse Rak Teh" (I Only Want Tea), reflecting the economic situation of the members of "Yahdav".

=== The Second Kassit ===
The name "Kasit" ceased to be used for a coffeehouse until Hatzkel Ish Kasit adopted it again and opened the well-known coffeehouse at 117 Dizengoff Street in 1944.

The cafe is featured in Uri Zohar's 1964 film, Hole in the Moon.

=== 1990s ===
At the end of the 1990s, a severe and prolonged conflict emerged between the owner of Kassit and the bohemian community from its early years. The conflict revolved around the prolonged and non-profitable (according to the owner's perspective) use of tables placed on Dizengoff Street. The owner accused them of deterring a younger crowd and insisting on continuing the traditions of purchasing as though it were a grocery store and other complaints.

On the other hand, representatives of the older generation argued that the place is a cultural and urban institution of the highest order. They believed their gatherings ought to be supported, even if they were not financially lucrative.

From 1996 to 2001, a legal battle over the coffeehouse took place between Zev Litman and the owners, who had leased it to Hatzkel under a protected lease. During this period, Leah was no longer involved in the affairs of the café. Leah died on February 9, 2011, at the age of 101.

=== 2000s ===
In the beginning of 2004, the coffeehouse came under new ownership and was transformed. This time, it reopened as a café/dance bar with a modern look called "Coffee Inn." The new owners showed sensitivity to the heritage of the place, designating an internal space as "Kassit Corner" adorned with pictures from the heyday of the bohemians. They also displayed a selected photograph of the coffeehouse's football team taken by Max Salomon. Despite the tribute, it became evident that the older crowd preferred the traditional seating outside the coffeehouse around the tables in front of the cafe. That section returned to its original role as part of the coffeehouse in the spring of 2005.

By the end of 2006, the venue changed ownership again and rebranded as "Edelson 10." Eight years later, it closed down.

=== Legacy ===
In the years 2010–2011, the documentary films "All the people of Kassit" and "All the people of Kassit - The Last Generation" were broadcast on Channel 8. Directed by Meir Suissa, these films explored the story of the establishment.
