= Baruch Agadati =

Israeli dancer and artist (1895–1976)

- ברוך אגדתי
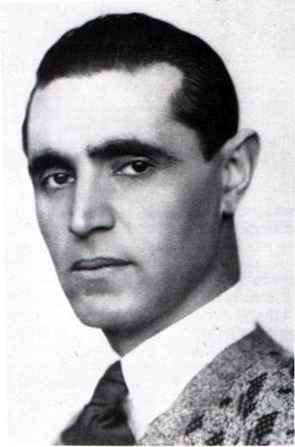
- Agadati in 1925
- Born: Baruch Kaushansky; January 8, 1895 (Julian calendar); Bendery, Bessarabia Governorate, Russian Empire
- Died: 18 January 1976 (aged 81)
- Resting place: Trumpeldor Cemetery, Tel Aviv, Israel
- Citizenship: Israel
- Education: Bezalel Academy of Arts and Design
- Awards: Worthy Citizen of Tel Aviv Award, Municipality of Tel Aviv-Yafo, 1976

Baruch Agadati (Hebrew: ברוך אגדתי, also Baruch Kaushansky-Agadati; January 8, 1895 [Julian calendar] – January 18, 1976) was a Romanian-born Israeli classical ballet dancer, choreographer, painter, and film producer and director.

== Biography ==
Baruch Kaushansky (later Agadati) was born to a Jewish family in the Bessarabia Governorate, Russian Empire and grew up in Odessa. He immigrated to the region of Palestine in the early 1900s. In Palestine, he was known for performing Jewish folk dances in an expressionist style, often in solo performances he called "concerts" in which he would portray different Shtetl characters. His bohemian stylings—one performance featured him openly urinating on the back wall of the stage—scandalized the middle class.

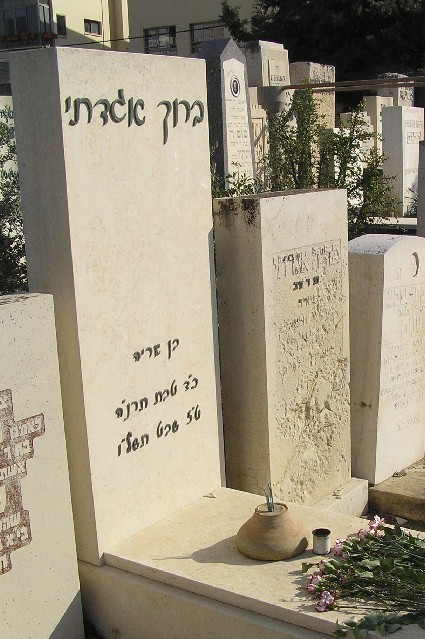
Grave of Baruch Agadati

Agadati attended the Bezalel Academy of Arts and Design in Jerusalem from 1910 to 1914. When World War I started in 1914, he was in Russia visiting his parents and was unable to return to Palestine. He remained there and studied classical ballet, joining the dance troupe of the Odessa Opera and Ballet Theater. In 1919, he returned to Palestine. In 1920, he moved to the Neve Tzedek neighborhood in Tel Aviv. Until his death is 1976, he worked in theatre, painted, danced and choreographed Israeli folkdance, produced the famous Purim "Adloyada" Carnival balls. He is buried in Trumpeldor Cemetery in Tel Aviv.

== Dance and film career ==
Kaushansky returned to Russia during the First World War and took the name Agadati. Agadati returned to Palestine on board the Ruslan, along with him was the historian Joseph Klausner, the artist Yitzhak Frenkel and architect Ze'ev Rechter. he began to give solo dance recitals and became one of the pioneers of cinema in Israel. Agadati purchased cinematographer Yaakov Ben Dov's film archives in 1934, when Ben Dov retired from filmmaking. He and his brother Yitzhak used it to start the AGA Newsreel. He directed the early Zionist film entitled This is the Land (1935), the first Hebrew speaking film, and a new version in 1963, called Tomorrow's Yesterday.

In the 1920s and 1930s, he was known for organizing Adloyada Tel Aviv Purim balls.

Agadati's costume for "Yihie" ("Yemenite Ecstasy"), a solo show that also toured Europe and South America, was designed by Natalia Goncharova of Ballets Russes.

In 1924, Agadati choreographed a dance based on the Romanian Hora that became known as "Hora Agadati". It was performed by the Ohel Workers' Theatre, which toured pioneer settlements in the Jezreel Valley. The dancers form a circle, holding hands and move counterclockwise following a six-beat step in a walk-walk-step-kick-step-kick pattern.

== Education ==
- 1910 Bezalel Academy of Art and Design, Jerusalem, with Boris Schatz
- 1914-19 Dance and painting, Odessa
- 1930 Painting, Florence

== Teaching ==
- Odessa, classical ballet, painting and music

== Awards and recognition ==
- 1976 Worthy Citizen of Tel Aviv Award, Municipality of Tel Aviv-Yafo

== Gallery ==
Archival photographs of Baruch Agadati in costume, taken during the late 1920s.
Photographer: Atelier Willinger, Vienna
Collection of the Bat Sheva and Yitzhak Katz Archive, Information Center for Israeli Art, Israel Museum, Jerusalem

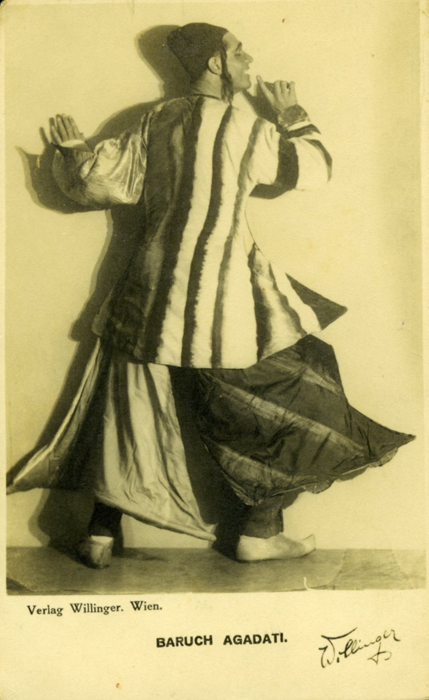
Baruch Agadati in the Dance "Yemenite Ecstasy"

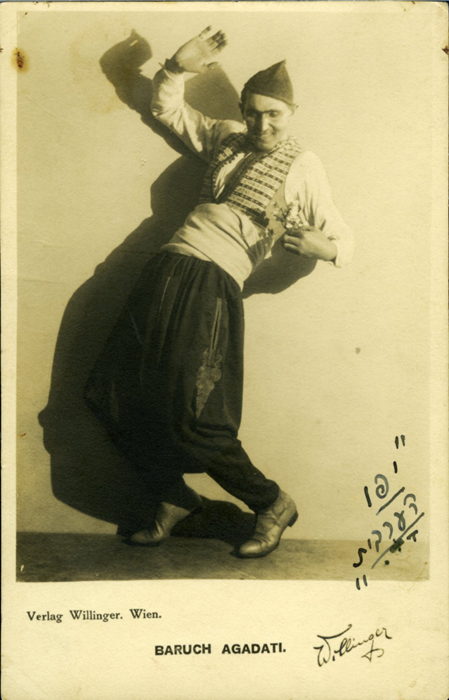
Baruch Agadati in the Dance "Jaffa"

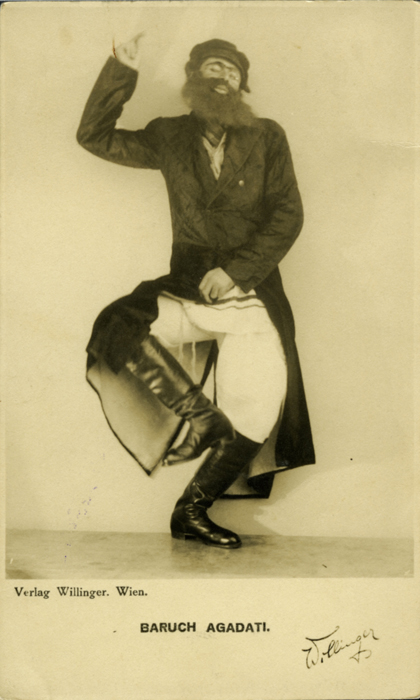
Baruch Agadati in the Dance "Melaveh Malka"

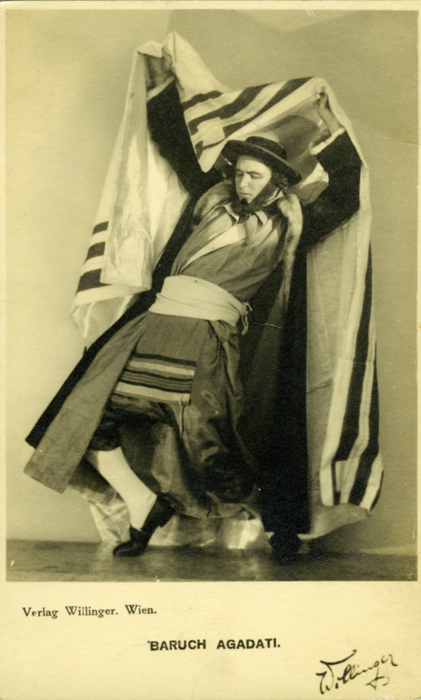
Baruch Agadati as Hassid in the Dance "Melaveh Malka"

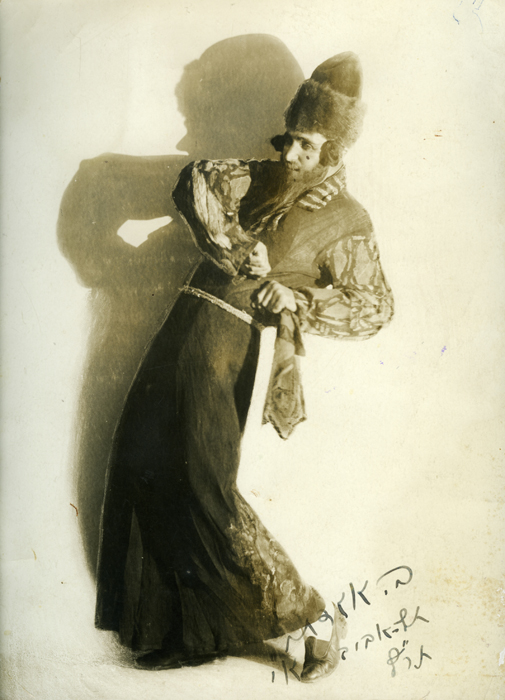
Baruch Agadati as Rabbi Meir in the Dance "Melaveh Malka"

== See also ==
- Cinema of Israel
- Dance of Israel
- Visual arts in Israel

== Sources ==
- Judaica Reference Sources
- Young Tel Aviv: A Tale of Two Cities - Google Books
- Exhibitions of Baruch Agadati: Painting on Silk. Selfridges Gallery, 1967
