= Moshe Halevy =

Israeli playwright, Ohel Theatre founder and director

- משה הלוי
- Born: 26 February 1895; Mstislav, Mstislavsky Uyezd, Mogilev Governorate, Russian Empire (present-day Belarus)
- Died: 26 December 1974 (aged 79)
- Resting place: Tel Aviv
- Citizenship: Israeli
- Occupation: Theatre Directior
- Spouse(s): Hanna Rovina, Lea Dganit
- Children: Ahala Halevy

Moshe Halevi (Hebrew: משה הלוי; 1895–1974) was an Israeli theatre director, founder of the Ohel theatre.

Born as Moshe Wolfovich Gurevich in the city of Mstislav in Russia (today in Belarus). Halevi was a member of the "Habima" theater in Moscow when it was founded in 1917. In mandatory Palestine he founded the Ohel theatre which would become one of the most important theatres in pre-independence Israel. He also wrote several plays.

== Ohel Theatre ==
He immigrated to Israel in the early 1920s and in 1925 founded the Ohel Theater, the name of which he chose together with Hayim Nachman Bialik. He gathered a group of 22 young and inexperienced actors and guided them to the stage, for their first performance in -22 May 1926 at the debut of "Peretz Balls", an evening of skits based on the stories of Y.L. Peretz, in the Herzliya Gymnasium Hall. In the years 1932–1937 he directed the Adeloyada procession in Tel Aviv.

He worked closely with the Israeli French painter, Isaac Frenkel, who did the costume and set designs for several of his pieces. In 1954 Halevi established a theater studio called 'Dohan', which operated under the auspices of Beit Zionei America.

== Influence ==
Halevi was the home director of the tent and its manager. Halevi was a follower of the Stanislavsky method of the Russian theatre director Konstantin Sergeevich Stanislavsky, which placed the emphasis on a strong expression of emotions, and in this spirit he directed the Ohel plays. During the Yishuv period, the Ohel, next to Habima, was one of the leading theaters in the Yishuv. After independence, the Ohel declined in popularity, until it finally closed in the 1960s.

== Personal life ==
Moshe Halevi was married to Hana Rubina, and divorced her before immigrating to the Land of Israel. In Israel, he married the actress Leah Deganit, and they had a daughter, the singer Ohela Halevi, who was the first wife of Shaike Ophir.

He was buried in the Kiryat Shaul cemetery. His daughter erected a tombstone in the form of a tent on his grave (she did the same on her mother's grave).

== See also ==
- Ohel theatre
- Habima
- Isaac Frenkel
- Hannah Rovina
