= Genia Berger =

Israeli artist (1907–2000)

Genia Berger גניה ברגר
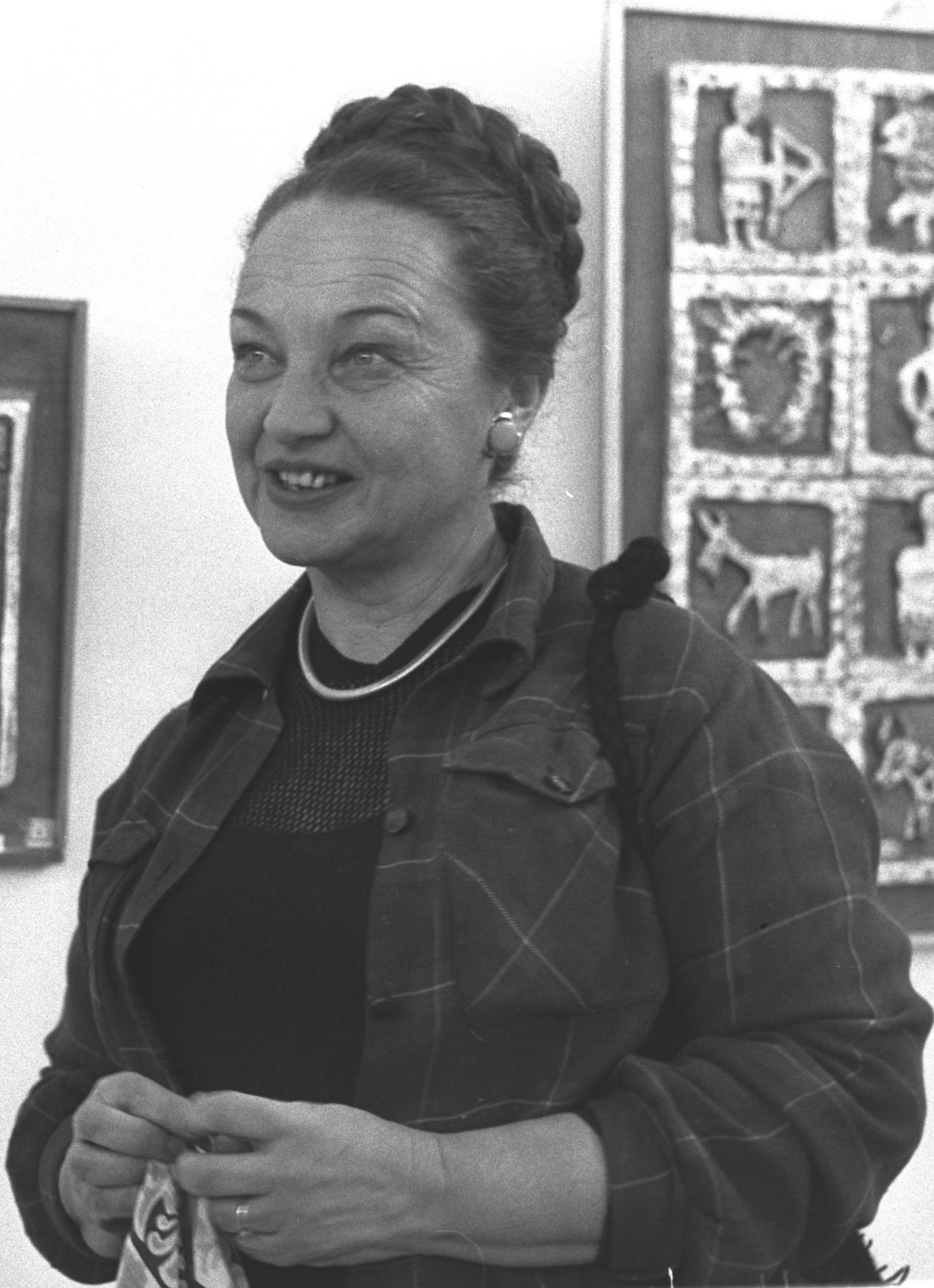
- Genia Berger (1960)
- Born: 1907; Kharkov
- Died: 2000 (aged 92–93)
- Education: Academy of Fine Arts, Berlin
- Known for: Painting, sculpting, ceramics
- Movement: Israeli art

Genia Berger (Hebrew: גניה ברגר; 1907–2000) was an Israeli artist, born in the Russian Empire.

== Biography ==
Genia Berger was born in Kharkov in 1907 to a traditional and Zionist family. In 1925 she moved to Germany, where she studied art. In 1926 she immigrated to Palestine and began to simultaneously study architecture at the Technion Montefiore and painting in Yitzhak Frenkel's studio in Tel Aviv. In the end of 1929, she returned to Berlin, where she began to study painting and set design at the Academy of Fine Arts. In 1933, she returned to Palestine and began to make a living by designing stage sets. From 1935 to 1937 she resided in Paris, France. In 1953 she became one of the founders of the artists' village of Ein Hod in Northern Israel.

Berger's early work, influenced by Isaac Frenkel, who taught modern French art trends, was in the post-impressionist painting style. Nonetheless, between the ages of 40 and 60, she focused mainly on theater set design for theater and the opera theater in Israel. Her designs were influenced considerably by Russian Modernist decorative art. Her works include set design for "The King Solomon and the Cobbler" (Ohel Theater, 1943), "Bar Kokhba" (Ohel Theater, 1945), "Khovanshchina" (Israel National Opera, 1952), "Kazmirov Brothers" (Habima, 1956) and more. In the 1950s, Berger returned to painting and began sculpting and creating ceramic reliefs. Her works are characterized by a decorative aspect.

== Gallery ==
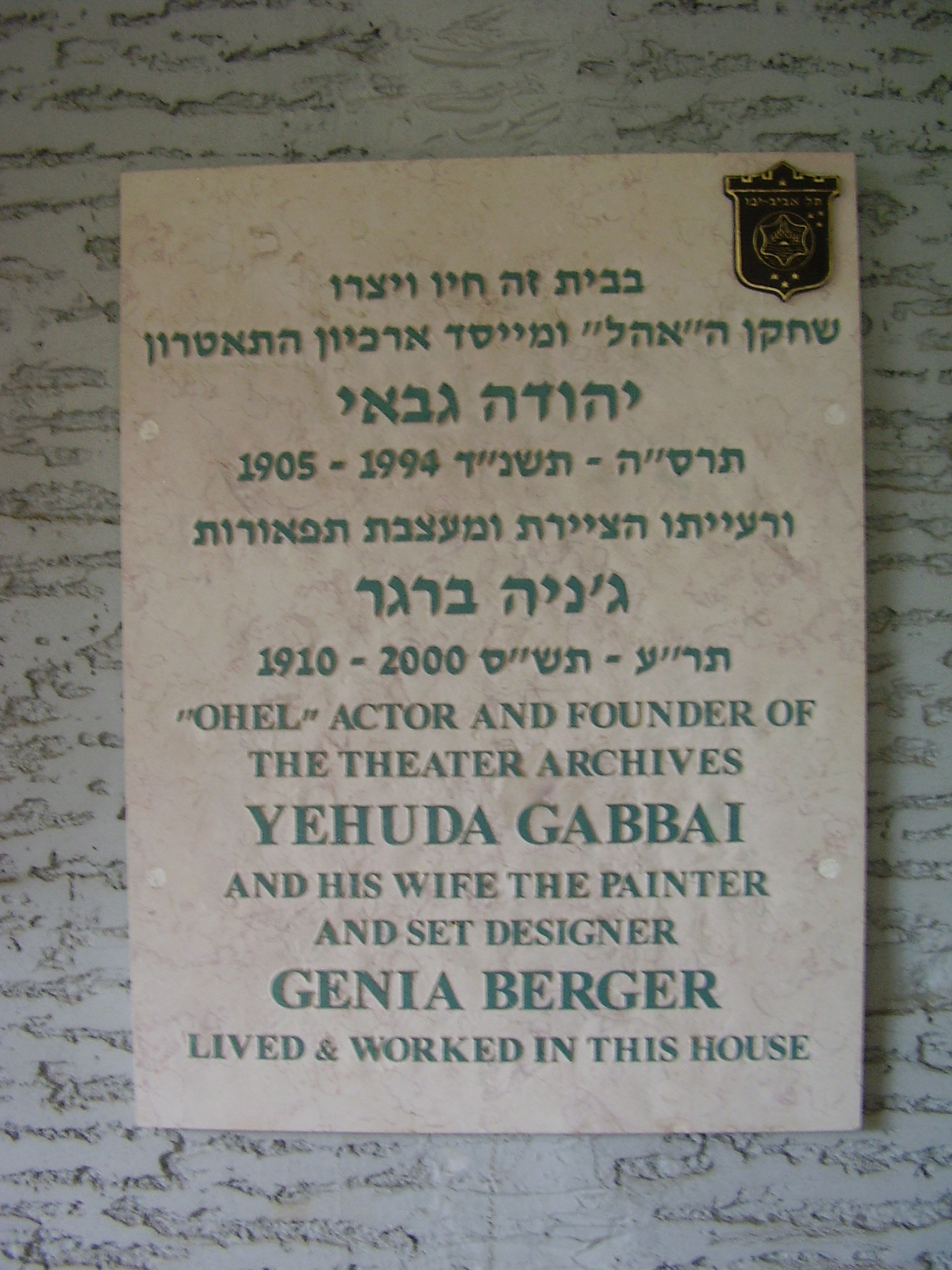
Memorial Plaque on the House of Yehuda Gabai & Genia Berger, 2012
Tel Aviv

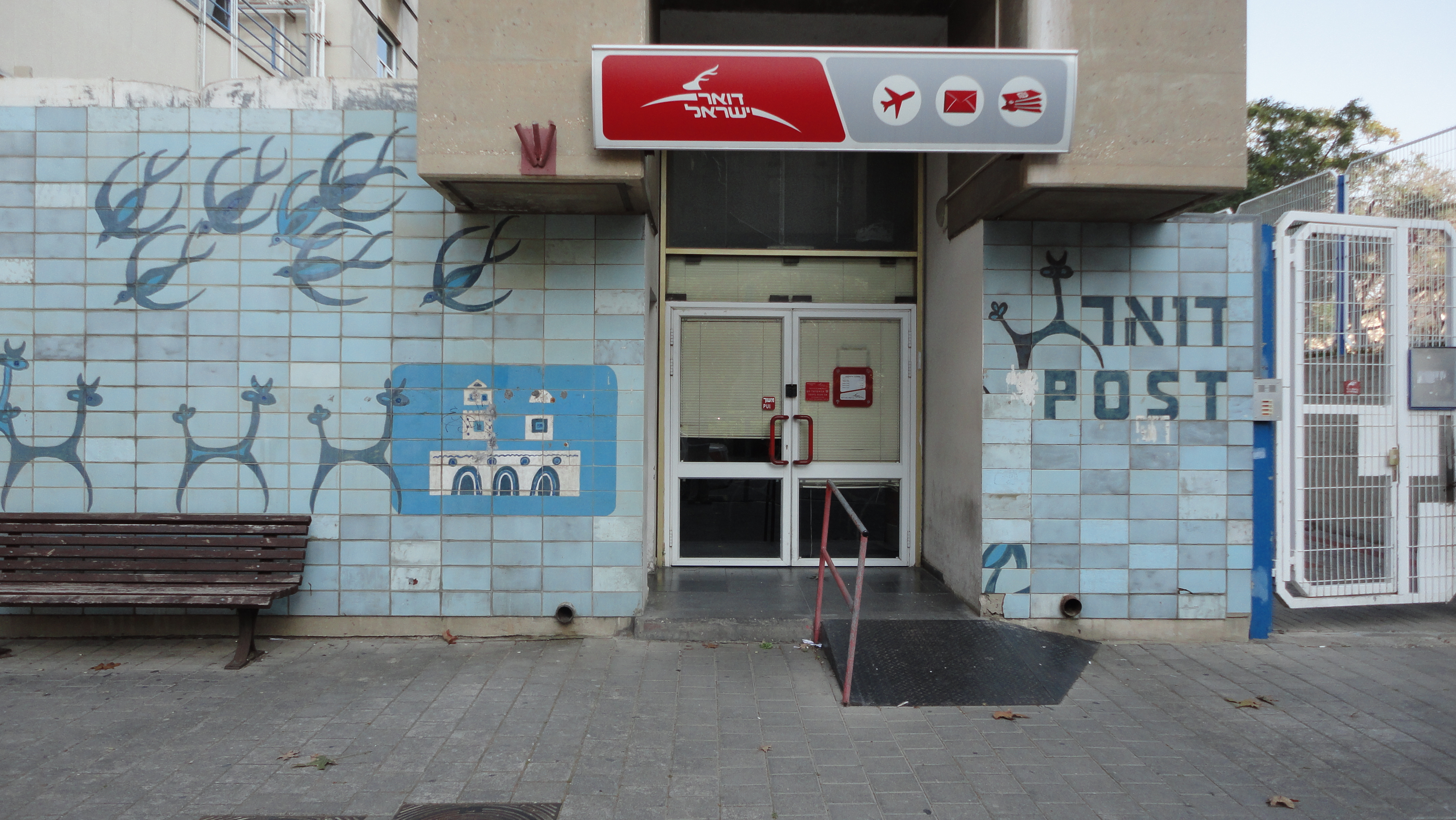
Post Office Wall, 2011
Weizmann St., Tel Aviv

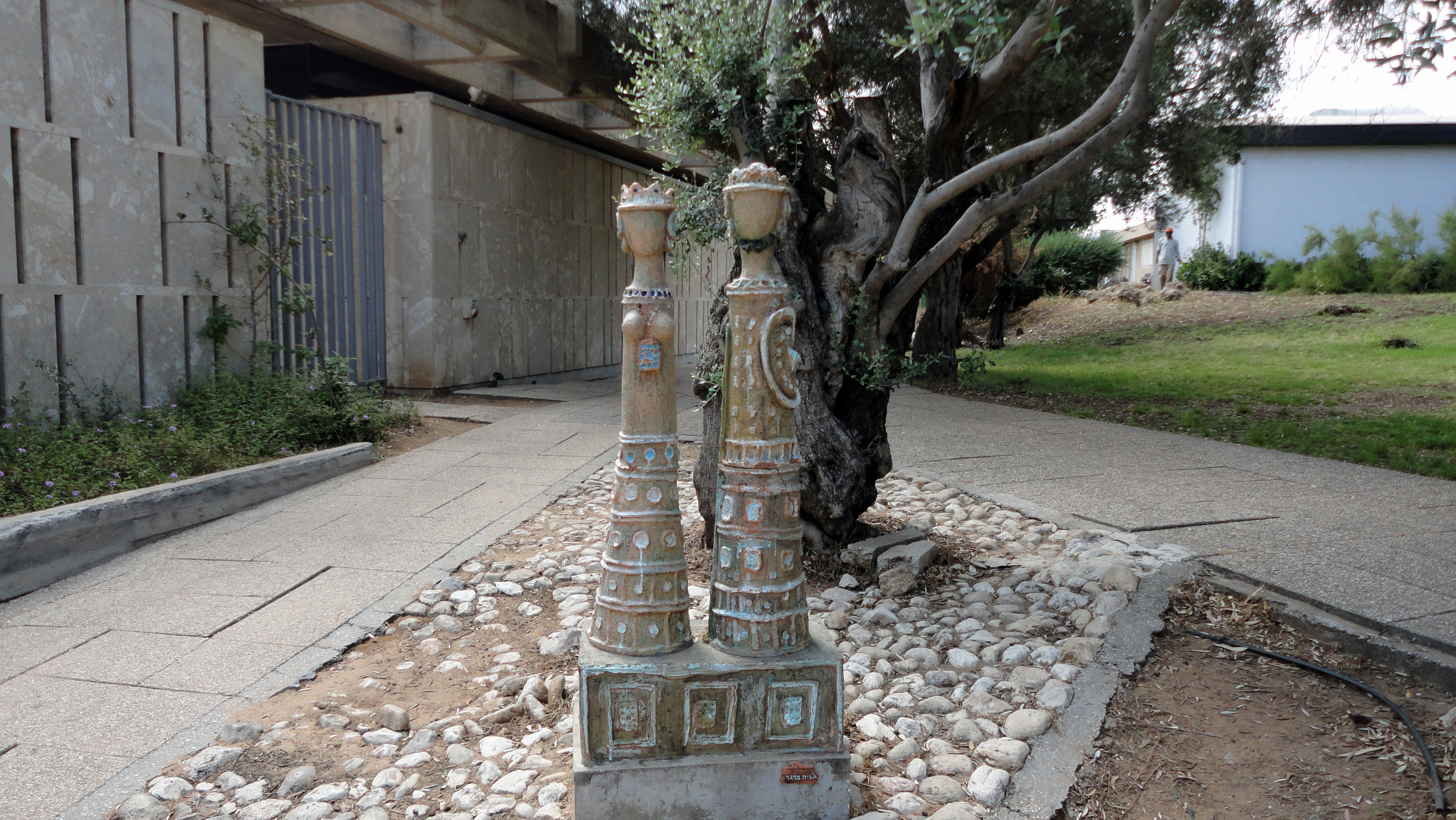
The Ceramics Pavilion, 2012
Eretz Israel Museum

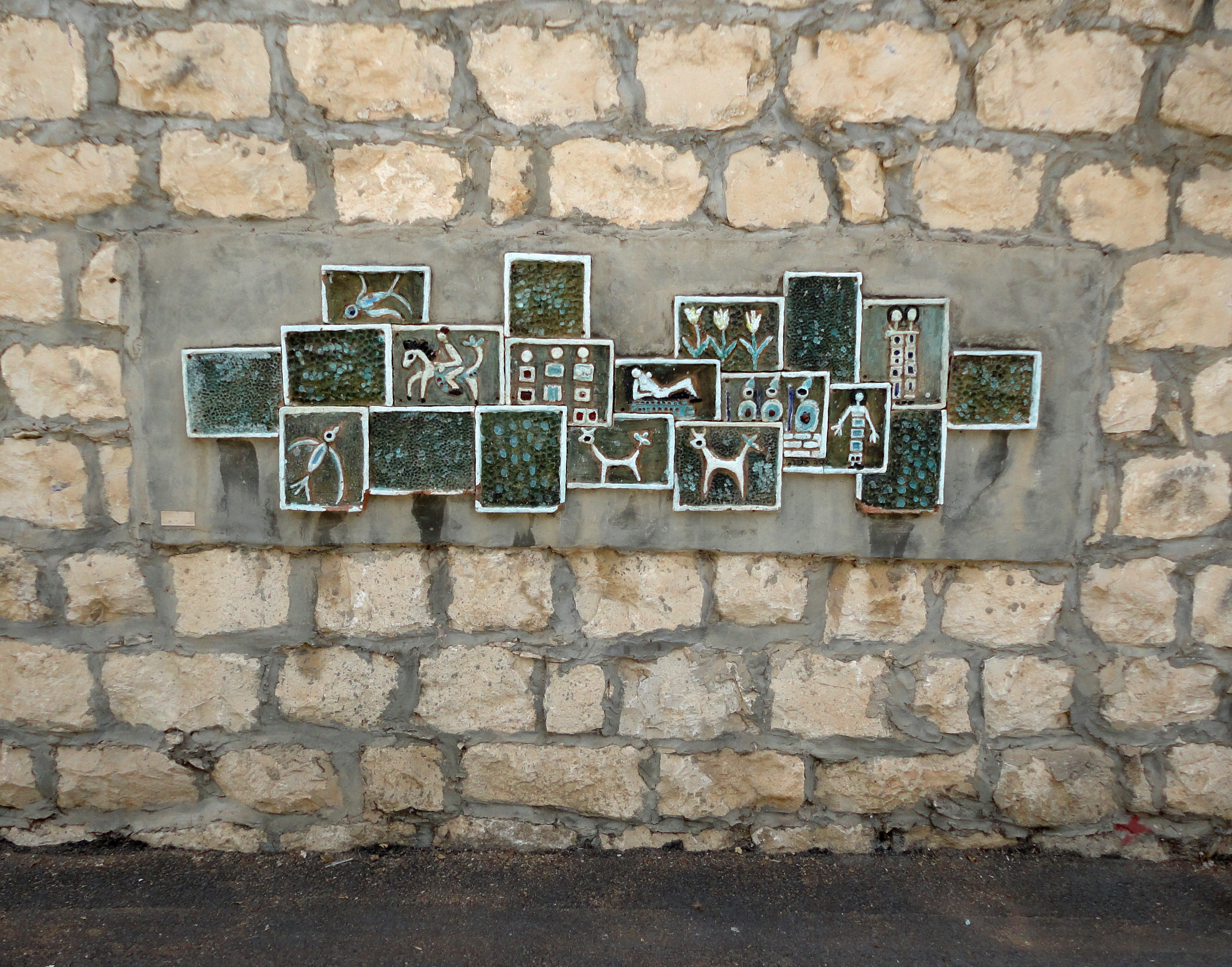
Ceramic Wall, 1966
Relief, glazed ceramic
Main Gallery, Ein Hod

== Education ==
- Sculpture under Leonardo Bloch, Cracow, Russian Empire.
- 1925 Painting, State Academy of Fine Arts, Berlin
- 1926 Architecture, Montefiore Technion, Tel Aviv
- 1926 Painting with Yitzhak Frenkel, Tel Aviv
- 1930–1933 State Academy of Fine Arts, Berlin, under Willi Jaekel and Karl Hofer
- 1935–1937 Post-graduate studies, Académie de la Grande Chaumière, Paris, France

== Awards and recognition ==
- 1986 General Workers' Union Prize, Israel
- The Golomb House Award, The Artists' Village, Ein Hod
- 1971 Ministry of Education, Culture and Sport
- 1984 Association of Designers in Israel

== See also ==
- Visual arts in Israel
- Yehuda Gabai, "Her Grandmother Babushka", Tel Aviv 1996, Hebrew
- A.D. Shafir, "Theater Works, a collection of works by Genia Berger", Shafir Publishing House, 1994, Hebrew
