= Shlomo Zemach =

Israeli author, agriculturalist and early Zionist pioneer

Shlomo Zemach שלמה צמח
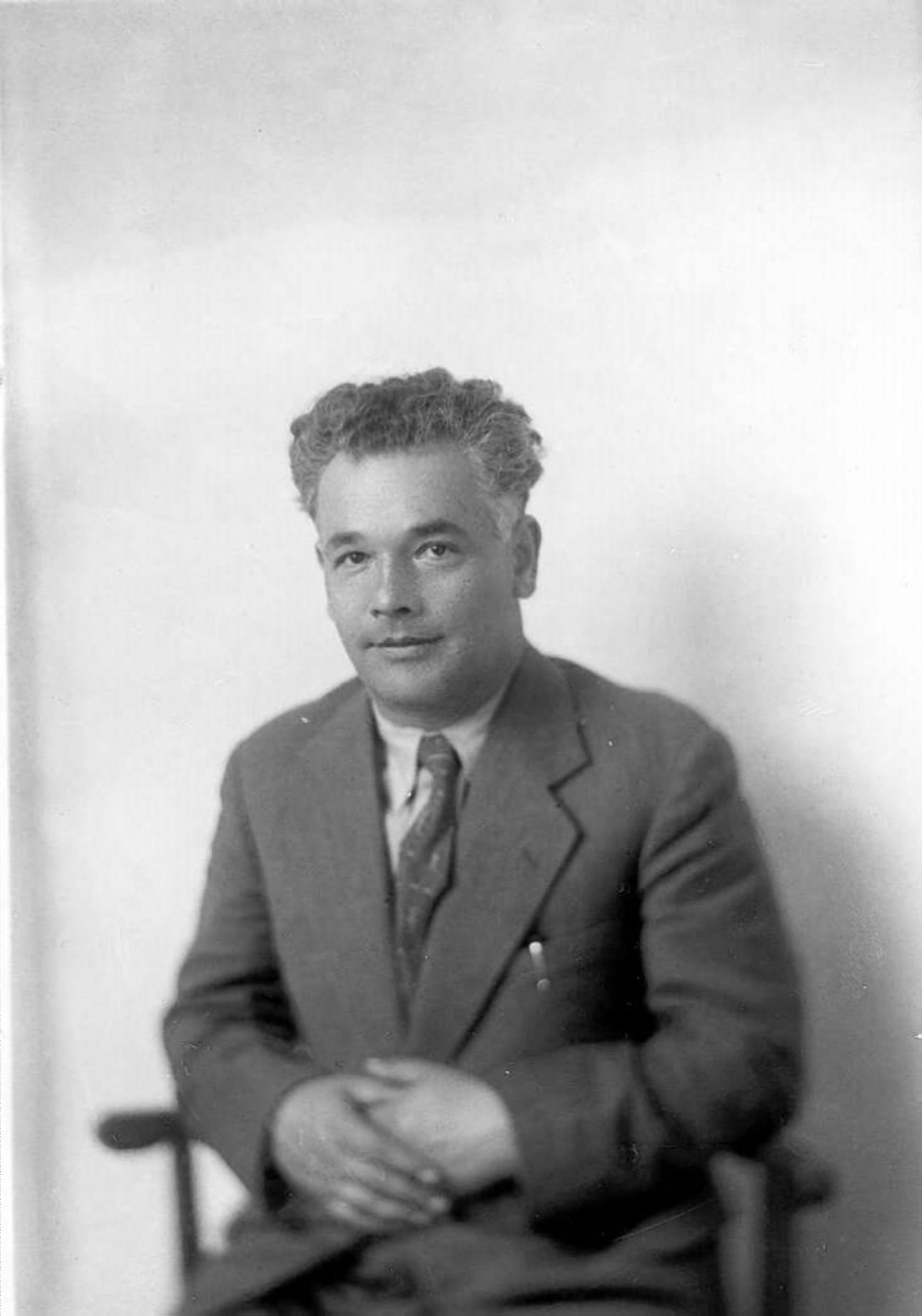
- Born: 2 June 1886; Płońsk, Poland, Russian Empire
- Died: 6 November 1974 (aged 88); Israel
- Resting place: Har HaMenuchot, Jerusalem
- Citizenship: Israeli
- Writing career
- Language: Hebrew
- Notable awards: Bialik Prize (1944); Israel Prize (1965)

Shlomo Zemach (Hebrew: שלמה צמח; 2 June 1886 – 6 November 1974) was an Israeli author, agriculturalist, and early Zionist pioneer.

== Biography ==
Zemach was born in 1886 in Płońsk, Poland, then part of the Russian Empire, and was a descendant of Rabbi Avraham Gombiner (known as the "Magen Avraham") and his descendant, Rabbi Zvi Hirsch HaLevi of Plonsk (known as the "Plant (Zemach) of Avraham", from where Zemach's surname originates). His family was the wealthiest in Płońsk. He was a childhood friend of David Ben-Gurion. Zemach received a traditional Jewish education at cheder and beit midrash. In 1900, at the age of 14, Ben-Gurion and Zemach founded a Zionist youth association in Płońsk, under the name Ezra Association, whose members spoke only Hebrew.

In 1904, Zemach was the first Zionist to emigrate from Płońsk to Ottoman Palestine using 300 rubles his father had entrusted him to take to the bank. He worked as an agricultural worker for five years. In 1905, he was among the founders of the Hapoel Hatzair Zionist organisation. In 1906 he returned to Płońsk to make peace with his family and in early September traveled back to Palestine with Ben Gurion, Rachel Nelkin and her mother Shoshana.

Whilst in Rehovot in 1908 he met a secretly married Hemda Polansky. She was from a wealthy family. They moved to Jerusalem to an apartment in Jerusalem owned by her brothers. They held literary salons and Ben Gurion was a regular visitor. In the spring of 1911, they returned to Płońsk and divorced. Zemach then studied agriculture, literature and philosophy in France. In 1914, he qualified as an agricultural engineer and went to visit his parents' home in Płońsk, where he was caught up in the outbreak of the First World War. He was engaged in literary work in Warsaw and later on in Odessa. In 1921, he returned to then British-administered Palestine. He was employed as a teacher at the Mikveh Israel agricultural school and, in 1933, he was the principal founder of the Kadoorie Agricultural High School and served as its first headmaster.

He wrote a number of books and articles on agriculture. He was also a literary critic and edited the literary journal Maazanim.

== Awards ==
- In 1944, Zemach was awarded the Bialik Prize for Literature, jointly with Yehuda Karni.
- In 1955, he was awarded the Brenner Prize for Literature, jointly with Yeshuron Keshet.
- In 1965, he was awarded the Israel Prize, in literature.

== Published works ==
- Elijah Margaret (Roman), Warsaw: Jewish Press, 1921.
- First year, published by Am Oved, 1952.
- Stories from the Life of the Land, published by Rubin Mass Press, 1939.
- Essay and Criticism, published by Dvir, 1954.

== See also ==
- List of Israel Prize recipients
- List of Bialik Prize recipients
