= Yitzhak Frenkel =

Israeli French, École de Paris artist (1899–1981)

Isaac Frenkel
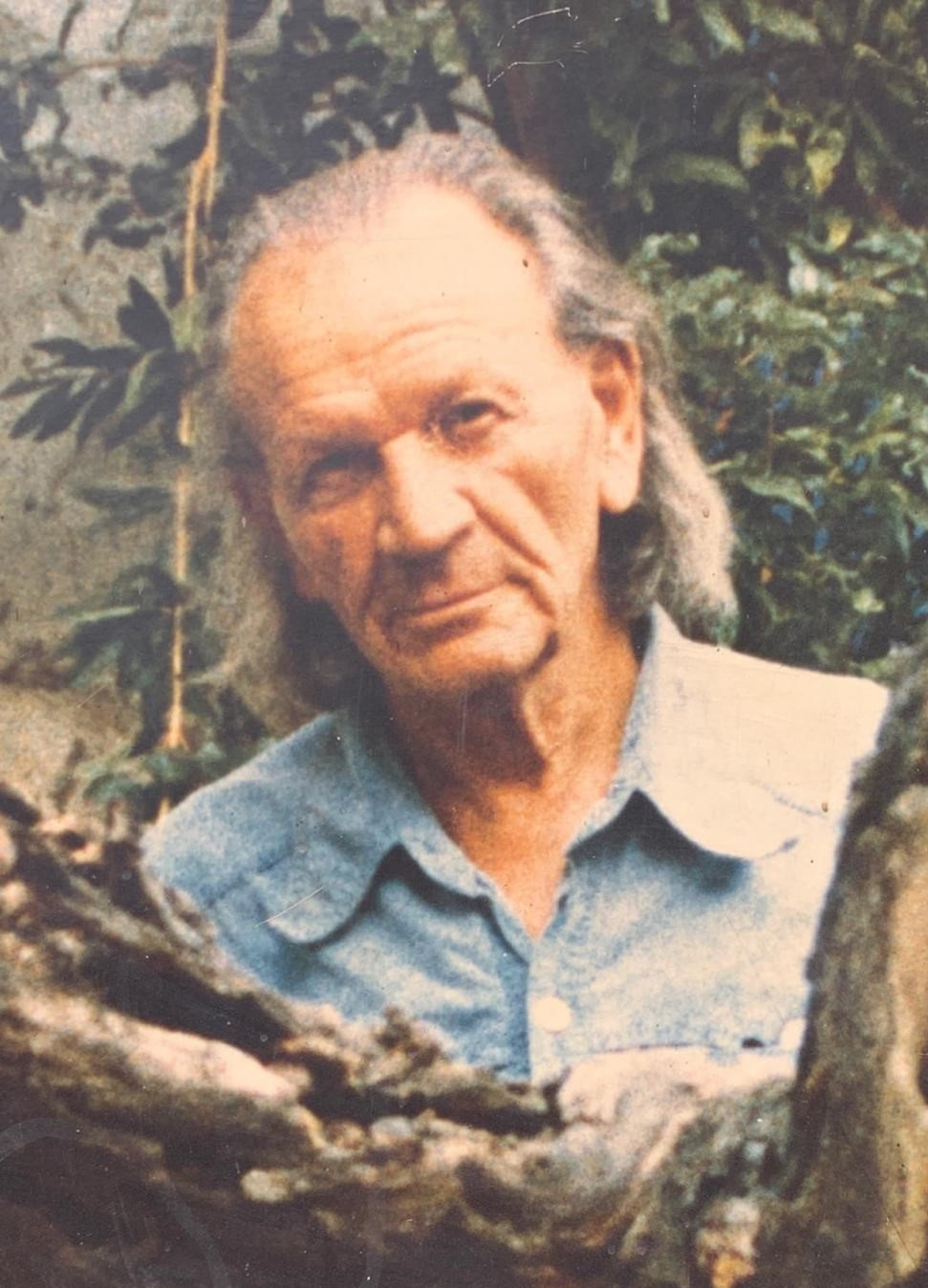
- Frenkel Frenel
- Born: Yitzhak Frenkel; 10 August 1899; Odessa, Russian Empire
- Died: 4 April 1981 (aged 81); Tel Aviv, Israel
- Resting place: Safed, Israel
- Education: Fine Arts Academy of Odessa, École des Beaux-Arts, Académie de la Grande Chaumière
- Known for: Art: Painting, Sculpture
- Notable work: Connection of Objects
- Style: Expressionism, Cubism, Futurism, Abstract, Realism,
- Movement: École de Paris
- Spouse(s): Yudith (1st, div), Miriam (2nd died), Inget (3rd died), Ilana (4th)
- Children: 8
- Awards: Dizengoff Prize 1934,1938,1939,1940,1948, Grand Prix de Paques (nude) 1972, Grand Prix de Noel (expressionism) 1972, Grand Prix de Deauville 1973, Grand prix International de Peinture de la Côte d’Azur en France Finale 1973
- Website: https://www.frenkelfrenel.org/

Yitzhak Frenkel (Hebrew: יצחק פרנקל; 1899–1981), also known as Isaac Frenkel or Alexandre Frenel, was an Israeli painter, sculptor and teacher. He was one of the leading Jewish artists of the l’École de Paris and its chief practitioner in Israel, gaining international recognition during his lifetime.

Frenkel is considered the father of modern Israeli art. He is accredited with bringing the influence of the l’École de Paris to Israel, which until then was dominated by Orientalism.

Throughout his life he lived and worked in Portugal, South Africa, France, Odessa and Israel (especially in Tel Aviv and Safed).

He died in Tel Aviv in 1981 and was buried in Safed.

== Early life ==
=== Odessa ===
Yitzhak Frenkel was born in Odessa, Russian Empire to a Jewish family. He was a great-grandson of Rabbi Levi Yitzchok of Berditchev. In his youth he studied in a yeshiva where he met Chaim Glicksberg. As a child he lived right next to Bialik's and Rawnitzki's publishing house "Moriah". In 1917, he studied under Aleksandra Ekster, an influential constructivist, cubist and futurist teacher and painter at the Fine Arts Academy in Odessa, one of the leading art schools in the Tsarist Russia. His early years in Odessa were characterized by famine, pogroms, war and factional fighting in the Russian Empire, prompting him to explore Utopian themes, the classics and deepen his studies in the Bible, Talmud and Gemara. These themes were incorporated in his future art.

=== Early influence on his Art ===
Frenkel was also influenced by the paintings of the abstract musicalists shown in Odessa in 1917. Their symphonies of blue along with the musical nature of their colourful art were heavily present in Frenkel's later works. They took hold in Frenkel's attempts to express his deep feelings in his encounter with mystical Safed, their influence expresses itself in the painter's wandering blue strokes. The avant-garde art of Odessa and Russian in general would also manifest itself in some of Frenkel's works his thought and his early cubist and abstract art.

Frenkel immigrated to Mandate Palestine in 1919 with the first wave of settlers of the Third Aliyah, on board the SS. Ruslan.

== First period in Mandatory Palestine ==
In 1920, Frenkel pursued several artistic endeavors. He established the Ha-Tomer artists' cooperative along with the art patron Jacob Pereman, the painters Judith and Joseph Konstantinovsky Had Gadya and the sculptor Lev Halperin. Furthermore, he opened a small artists' studio in the carpentry of the Herzliya Hebrew Gymnasium, whence he taught painting and sculpture.

Having heard of Safed on the SS Ruslan from refugees from Safed as well as envoys of the Yishuv, Frenkel visited the city for the first time in 1920. Safed would become a major theme in Frenkel's art as well as a source of inspiration and later his home.

The battle of Tel Hai in 1920, prompted the quick gathering of young Jews to assist Joseph Trumpeldor and his company. However, they had arrived to late. Frenkel sketched and later painted the aftermath of the battle.

Later that year, he exhibited in Alexandria, accompanied by Judith and Joseph Constant. Due to economic hardship and dissatisfaction from the lack of appreciation toward modern art in the Yishuv, Frenkel left for France.

== Formation in Paris ==
=== Frenkel and the École de Paris ===
Frenkel then studied in Paris at the École des Beaux-Arts and at the Académie de la Grande Chaumière at the studios of the sculptor Antoine Bourdelle and painter Henri Matisse. At the time his painting were abstract. Towards the end of 1920, he traveled to Egypt where he showcased his works in an exhibition before returning to Paris.

Frenkel arrived in Paris just a few months after the death of Modigliani. Frenkel's time in Paris was crucial in the formation of the young artist. Frenkel's expressionistic style developed greatly during this period. His early days in Paris were characterized by poverty and hunger. He was evicted from his room and forced to live in the streets and under the bridges, leading a life seeking only art and basic necessities. At last he received a living stipend/scholarship from Wormser, an aid to the Baron de Rothschild lifting him from poverty.

He lived in Montparnasse and exhibited his work with his contemporaries and friends, Chaim Soutine, Michel Kikoine, Jules Pascin, Streling, Kostia Terechkovitch along with other Jewish artists of the École de Paris. He would also spend time in La Ruche in Montparnasse where he would meet other painters of the era. Frenkel would participate in long sessions with his fellow Jewish artists; he described thus their art: "members of the minority characterized by restlessness whose expressionism is therefore extreme in its emotionalism". In this period he also created abstract modernist works that were characteristic of the avant-garde trends in the French capital.

=== Exhibitions and recognition ===
He exhibited at the Salon des Indépendants alongside other artists of the time such as Soutine. They were both noticed by art critic Waldermar George. Waldermar George told Frenkel during the time "Do not return to Palestine, they will eat you there" (Frenkel would return in 1925). In 1924, the Dutch painter Piet Mondrian acquired two of his abstract paintings for an English collector. He also exhibited at the Salon d'Automne, and the Salon des Arts Sacrés.

"Remarkable in every respect: Picasso, Braque, Leger... and among the youngsters, Soutine, Frenel and Mane Katz"

== Revolutionary of modern art in the Jewish Yishuv ==
=== Art Pioneer ===
Frenkel returned to Palestine in 1925, where he revolutionized the visual arts. He opened the Histadrut Art School in Tel Aviv, the first studio of modern art in mandatory Palestine. He was considered extreme in his artistic orientations by his contemporaries. At the time Palestine, isolated from new developments in European art and seeking to adhere to religious-nationalistic work in the Art-Nouveau Style; saw art that was not at pace with art of European Capitals and deeply influenced by Orientalism. Frenkel's style was closer to the abstract and cubist painting of Paris than the orientalism popular in Palestine at that time. He was one of the country's first abstract painters. Frenkel did not demand even one grush from his students for his teaching.

His students included Shimshon Holzman, Mordechai Levanon, David Hendler, Joseph Kossonogi, Genia Berger and Siona Tagger. He was a mentor to Bezalel students Avigdor Stematsky, Yehezkel Streichman, Moshe Castel, and Arie Aroch. Several of his students (Such as Moshe Castel and others) included Bezalel art students who would visit Tel Aviv in order to absorb the "maestero's" teachings.

Frenkel revealed to his students the principles of French painting and weaned them away from the academic influence of the School Of Munich as well as the Russian schools of which he himself was originally perhaps a part of.

=== Style and Thoughts: The first Abstract painter ===
Frenkel's Parisian expressionism and modern French influence also influenced him as a teacher. Those who studied under him absorbed French influence and went to study in Paris in the 1920s and 1930s. Frenkel taught his students about Cézanne and Van Gogh and techniques he had learned in France. as well as Post-Impressionism. Which as of yet unknown. Frenkel had a pivotal role in propelling the art and cultural scene into modern trends. He taught his students the principles of color, texture and composition. He exposed his students to Jewish Expressionism as well as the intellectual basis and techniques of French art. On the Jewish School of Paris, he said "Like Jewish baroque, penetrating French romanticism, like Delacroix's"

In response to Jerusalem's conservative Bezalel's exhibitions, Frenkel's Tel-Aviv art studio in 1926, exhibited at the "Ohel" theater in the "Modern Artists" exhibition. Frenkel too exhibited, showing geometric compositions alongside landscape paintings. These were the first abstract paintings shown in the country. Frenkel and his students were described as "Modern Artists".

Frenkel's work and studio was one of the major factors in the cultural shift in importance in respect to Jewish art, from Jerusalem to Tel Aviv.

Upon his return home, Frenkel was struck by the gap between Paris, and the art of the Jewish Yishuv. He felt that he could not express the pioneers' struggle for survival in abstract art. Frenkel said "The intellectuals here turned to agriculture and road building. I wanted to plant a seed in this unsown land. It is impossible to imitate Israeli art; it must grow organically from the land". Furthermore, Frenkel in his rencounter with the mystical city of Safed, one of the great subjects of his art, feeling thus: "To paint here, is possible only through the direct contact with the landscape, like Russian songs attached to the Volga".

== Second Parisian Period ==
Following the great depression, the economic situation brought about the closure of the Histadrut art studio, following which Frenkel had to leave the Yishuv in search of better economic prospects. Between 1929 and 1934 Frenkel returned to Paris. During Frenkel created several frescos, an art he would continue endeavoring most of his life. In order to complement his dull income, Frenkel worked in French movie sets, creating decorative pieces and designing sets for Pathé as well as theatres.

In reaction to European events, the Ecole de Paris artists including Frenkel returned to paint in a more humanist style, in light of this Frenkel began to paint in a more realistic style. Furthermore, the subjects of his painting turned more frequently to human centered themes and less of the abstract exploration of the previous decade. Sensing the growing anti-Semitism, Frenkel left Europe in 1934, returning to Mandatory Palestine.

== Safed and Tel Aviv, 1930s, 40s ==
=== Safed ===
Reminiscent of his early encounter of Safed in 1920. In 1934, he made Safed his home, becoming the first artist to settle in the ancient holy city, 14 years before the "Artists' Colony" was formally established. There he painted the ancient synagogues, narrow lanes, local inhabitants and surrounding countryside.

He first encountered Safed after his Aliya to Mandatory Palestine in 1919, the ancient city left a deep impression on the young artist. Frenkel was entranced and mystified by the city's colours, its shades of blue, the chants of prayer and the alleyways. Frenkel romanticized the city and its landscapes. This is evident in his portrayal of Safed, mystic and spiritual, things unseen and hidden from the naked eye which the artist attempts to reveal. Frenkel, found in Safed a spirituality and inspiration that was harder to find elsewhere. According to Keehanski, in Safed, Frenkel felt he could connect with the long history of the Jewish people. Frenkel painted the ancient synagogues, narrow lanes, rabbis and their students, scenes of Jewish life, local residents and the landscape of Mount Meron.

Safed would remain a major theme of Frenkel's art, he would paint the houses in slanted forms as though they were dancing. Safed was between dreams and reality in his work. In his biblical art, figures from the Old Testament strolled and met in the Safed alleyways or its surrounding landscapes. He painted Jacob fighting the angel against the backdrop of Safed's mountains. Several of Frenkel's Safed works are full of hot volcanic colors. The sky fiery and trees bent by the power of this creation. Frenkel sought not to explore Safed's reality but the underlying mystery and burning emotionality of the ancient city. Safed's mysticism remained ever present in many of Frenkel's works, even in his later time in France: "A man cannot escape himself, I am my own eternal violin".

=== Late 1930s ===
During this period, Frenkel frequently moved between Safed, Jerusalem and most frequently Tel Aviv. At first he slept at his friend, Alexander Penn's home until his family finally moved to Tel Aviv in 1936. During that period he mostly abandoned the abstract style. He and Moshe Halevy designed the Adloyada in which he specifically designed the floats for the "Adloyada" carnival in Tel Aviv. In 1936 he began designing sets and costumes for the "HaOhel" theater and "HaBima" theater, and painted portraits of famous actors such as Hanna Rovina who worked there. In 1934, Frenkel published an article on French Art in the art monthly Gazith, a piece that was highly influential at the time.

In 1937, he embarked on a journey, painting Israel from point to point, North to South. He painted Safed, Jerusalem, Tel Aviv, the Negev desert as well as the Galilee. He made 13 exhibitions on the motif of Safed up-to 1950. Several of his landscapes showed the influence of Corot. In 1937, in his eyes, Jerusalem and its soil was brown and hot... Prompting the artist to paint Jerusalem and its hills (as well as Rosh Pina in which he saw a familiar brown) in a Rembrandtesque light.

In similar to fashion to his contemporaries. Frenkel was part of the Bohemian cultural life of Tel Aviv. Frequently sitting in Cafe Sheleg, Cafe Kassit Cafe Ararat and other places. He like the other artists and writers such as Alterman, Shlonsky, Castel and others with whom he sat, struggled economically and thus frequented cheaper establishments whence they paid with paintings or other means. Frenkel made several portraits during this time, several of them his friends. These include the writer Avraham Shlonski, the actress Hanna Rubina, the poet Yehuda Karni, the painter Miriam Einsfeld, the director Moshe Halevy and more... Frenkel was also commissioned in the 1930s to decorate the Belgian Pavilion in the Levant Fair.

In 1938, Frenkel reopened a studio in his Tel Aviv home where he taught mostly young students, among these were Ori Reisman, Dadi Ben Yehuda, Claire Yaniv and others. Two of his art works, Torah Ark and The Country and its Fruits; were chosen to represent the Jewish Palestine Pavilion in the 1939 New York World's Fair.

=== 1940s ===
In 1941, Frenkel moved to kibbutz Giva'at Brenner, there he taught art in the local school, teaching students from Givat Brenner and the nearby kibbutz Hulda. According to his son, Eliezer, in the face of unwilling students he explain his belief that "Anyone can paint, one must only want to". His time in the kibbutz was brief, partly due to the kibbutz' ill treatment of the artist which expressed in the Kibbutz's refusal to allocate the artist storage place for his art or a studio room; as well as his difficult integrating into the kibbutz lifestyle; he promptly returned to Tel Aviv between 1942 and 1943.

In 1942 he organized the first art exhibition in Safed, the entrance fee a symbolic one penny, allowing a diverse crowd to attend. In 1943, he embarked on a journey, traveling the Galilea, painting several landscapes, the Sea of Galilee, trees as well as the city of Tiberias. It is said his art was influenced and in dialogue with the work of Camile Corot and Rembrandt, in his exploration of lighter and darker shades of colour.

In 1944, marking 25 years since his aliya. He held a solo exhibition in the Tel Aviv Museum of Art that covered the entire second floor. There he presented different themes, including landscapes as well as grey sketches done in reaction to the events unfolding in Europe. He was heavily criticized by some for the latter who attested that the artist had ought to wait and understand more fully what had occurred. According to his son, Frenkel was critical of Socialist Realist art of the Soviet Union. He interpreted it as art imposed on Russian artists and contrary to the spirit of the "Artistes Indépendants" of which he was a part.

== Government work, Venice Biennale and Safed ==
=== Historical Recording, Venice Biennale ===
In 1948, Frenkel painted the first meeting of the Knesset as well as the first meeting of the military committee of the IDF. Which was probably intended as a sketch in preparation of a larger painting. He also made portraits of the first 120 MKs (Members of the Knesset), only few were finished or carried out in oil such as Uri Zvi Greenberg's portrait. Whilst Frenkel was commissioned to create a monumental work (8x6 meters), which would have portrayed 150 people including the entire First Knesset, Israel's President and Prime Minister, diplomats, journalists and other dignitaries. he met severe difficulties and challenges and was offered little government assistance. Following the minister of Education, David Remez's death and the swearing in of the Second Kneeset. The new education minister halted the support to Frenkel's work. Thus the court ordered the removal of Frenkel's work from the space allocated to it, forcing him to abandon the project.

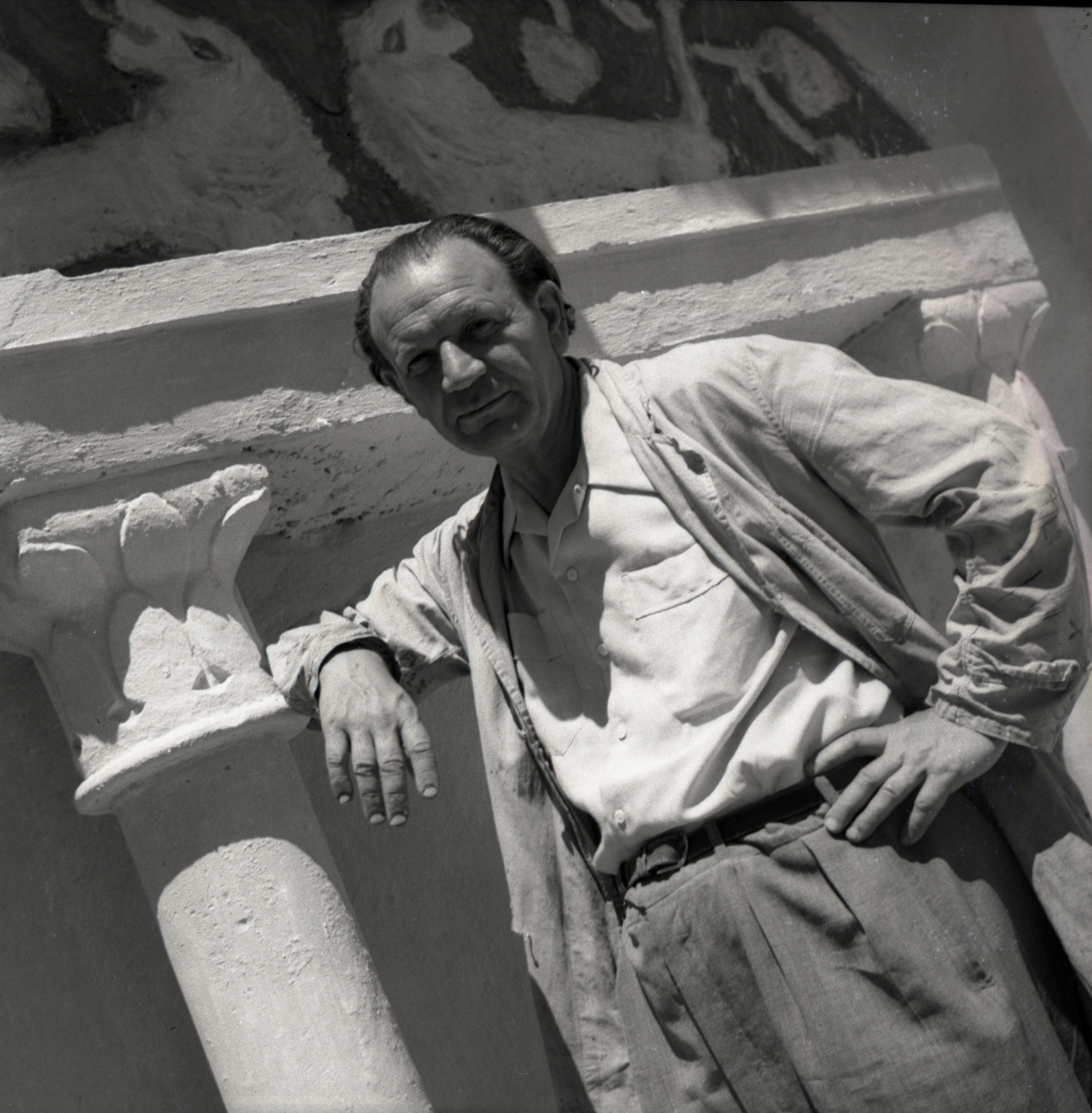
Isaac Frenkel Frenel, Safed, 1952, photographed by Beno Rothenberg

He was the first painter chosen by the State of Israel to represent the Jewish State at the Venice Bienniale. In 1950 he exhibited 7 artworks in the 25th Bienniale of Venice, representing Israel. He represented Israel once again in 1952 in the 26th Biennale. In Venice he received especially positive acclaim by Italian and Spanish art critics and positive attention by others. In 1952 he exhibited again in Paris.

He was recognized as artist of the year by HaOlam HaZeh for 1949 and by Yedioth Ahronot for the year 1953 (תשי"ג).

=== Safed late 1948-1954 ===
In 1949, he would become one of the founders of the "Artists Colony of Safed", also known as the Artists' Quarter of Safed. He distanced himself from most of the artists of the colony, leading to the colony's resentment of him.

With Safed's conquest during the 1948 Palestine war, Frenkel painted in relation to the liberation a painting of old Jewish men and women figures, in Safed, standing alone or in groups, whispering or contemplating what had occurred, redemption to them was another chapter in the long history of the Jews.

He opened a short lived Academy for Art in his Safed home in 1950. Among other things, Frenkel planned to teach art, the craft of vitrage (stained glass) and more. However, due to financial difficulties, he was soon forced to leave and seek his fortune elsewhere (in South Africa, Portugal and France).

== Between France and Israel ==
=== South Africa ===
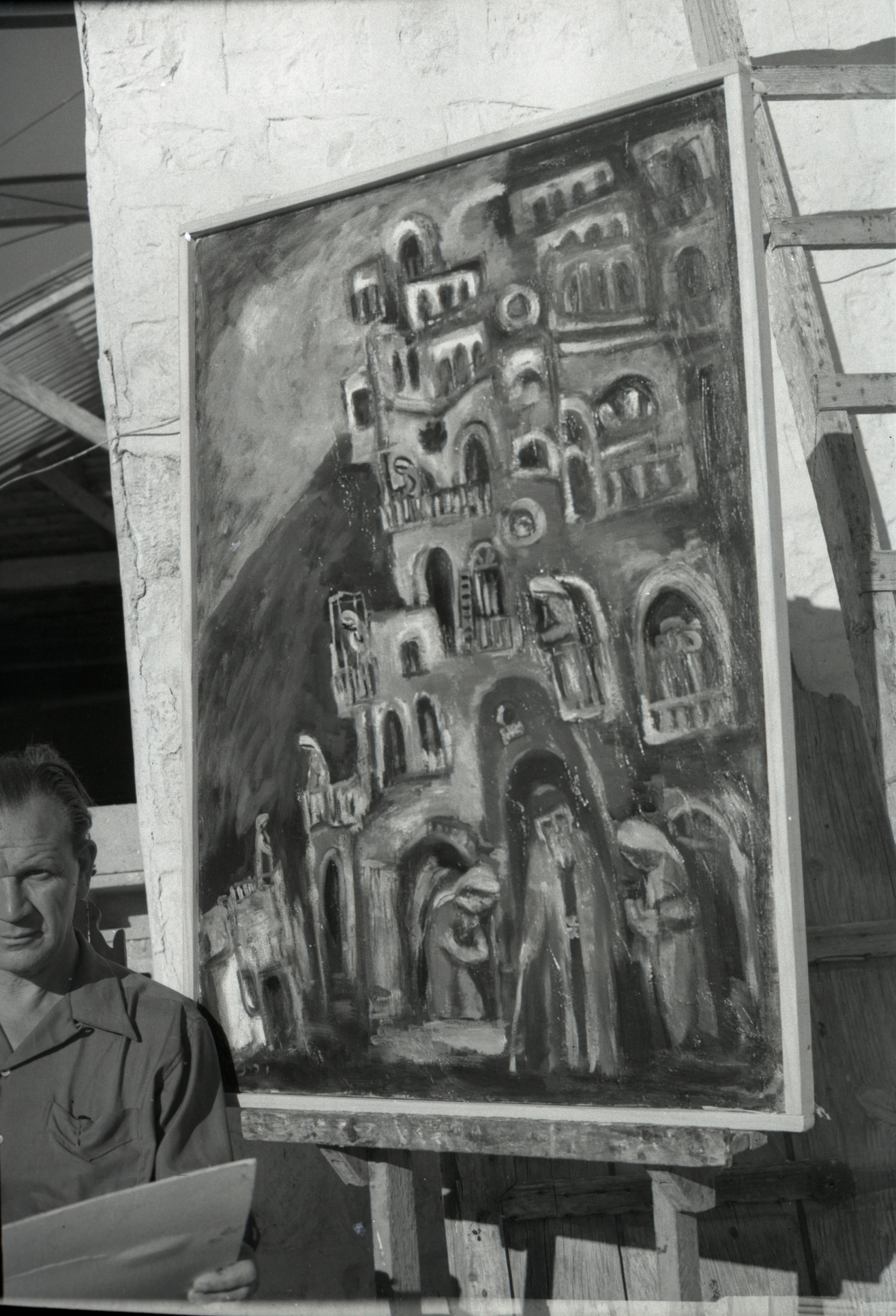
Frenkel Frenel, Safed

First having exhibited in South Africa in 1947; In 1953, Frenkel decided that before reaching his final destination (France) he would exhibit once again in South Africa. In South Africa, Frenkel was very well received, especially by the South African Jewish community. Having brought with him a large part of his art collection. he toured the country, exhibiting his work in One-Man exhibitions. In November 1953 he exhibited his work in Coronation Hall, Johannesburg. The exhibition was hosted by the Israeli ambassador S.C.Hyman . He received positive acclaim from art critiques, especially in regards to his paintings describing Jewish subjects and Safed, he was described as a mystical painter.

In January 1954, Frenkel exhibited his work in Muizenberg near Cape Town. There receiving acclaim for the synthesis of modern art and ancient Jewish subjects. His art was well received for not messaging propaganda and instead focusing on the picturesque and or human subjects of Israel and its attaining of international standard without attempted glorification. Joseph Sachs described his art as "volcanic", "religious", "musical", also saying "the artist has recapture...the mystic spirit of Safed- town steeped in Jewish lore", "Frenkel is a master in liberating the spirit imprisoned in the common object". His art was said to be of an international level when in February he exhibited in Greenacre's Exhibition Hall, Cape Town. In May 1954, Frenkel presented in Cape Town expressionist watercolors and pastels of South African landscapes as well as lively colorful sketches of Zulu figures.

His art appeared on the cover of Jewish Affairs, in December 1953 and January 1954.

=== France 1954-1960 ===
In 1954 he returned to France. There he de deepened his understanding of frescos; and studied glasswork, eventually received a commission of 1.5 million Francs from the Baroness Alix de Rothschild to create stained glass windows for a chapel in Normandy in the north of France. During the six-year period between 1954 and 1960 he started to sign his works as "Frenel"... Frenel explained this as his wishing to Hebraize his name, as well as his irritation at the commonality of the name Frenkel. This along with his windows for a Christian chapel led to rumors and negative coverage in regards to Frenel that he had abandoned Judaism, which were untrue.

Frenel continued to exhibit works concerning Safed. His work which combined the established themes of Jewish Parisian Expressionism was commended for transcending the traditional genre with his carefully established harmonious motion and synthetic power in which Frenel emanated his work. Frenel continued to offer a synthesis of Jewish spiritual traditions and French techniques, as well as incorporate into his work his attachment to Jewish mysticism. Furthermore, in reference to his June 1955 exhibition at the Marcel-Bernheim gallery, some of his art was noted to resemble 12th century vitrages and his colour choices as Byzantine. The religious nature of the art caused his subsequent comparison to Rouault by the French press. His work appeared in the cover of Masques et Visages on the 29th of June 1955.

Frenel reflected that his continued delving into Jewish subjects such as a man carrying the Torah Scroll, rabbis, wailing and more was heavily influenced by his childhood and his mother's teaching in regards to the tragedies that befell the Jewish people and the traditions of his culture and religion. Frenel's distinctive art gained him a reputation for uniqueness while still adhering to the Ecole de Paris movement. Frenel continued the bohemian tradition of sitting different Cafes, frequenting the Café Le Select and other locations, where the local intellectuals and the interested would gather and strike up conversations. Frenel participated and received positive acclaim in the 1955,1956 Salon Des Independents, Salon d'Autumne as well as the Sixth Salon d'Art Sacré in 1956. He exposed his art as part of an official French delegation in an exhibition at Galeries Lafayette in London in 1956. In 1956 he was the only Israeli painter included in the Encyclopedia of Painting: paintings and painters of the World from prehistoric times to the present day. Furthermore, Frenel participated in an exhibition of the Musée d'Art et d'Histoire du Judaïsme in 1956. Waldemar George, said the following regarding Frenel's very human and emotional art:

"Frenel's humanity does not lie in a phycological concept that constitutes only art, it resides in a component of the man, who magnifies everything he touches..."

During this time, the diversity of his art's themes grew. He painted clowns, the circus, sailors, boatmen as well as the landscapes of France, especially the coast of La Rochelle, Cote d'Azur, Bretagne and Paris. He did several series' of paintings of Venice, where he had exhibited several times. He painted more frequently still life and nature, his art, especially his coloring technique receiving acclaim in several French press journals. The art critic of Le Figaro, Raymond Coginiat described Frenel's art as musical thus: "The tonal chords are like musical tones and seem to modulate the space". In 1959, the French Government bought one of Frenel's works "Port en Méditerranée"', The Hôtel de Ville of Paris acquired a lithography for 7,500 Francs .

=== 1960s and 1970s ===
Frenel returned to Israel in 1960 and immediately met great difficulties. The artist whose works by then decorated the walls of museums on several continents had his home in Safed taken from him and converted into a technical school due to false rumours; forcing the painter to petition the President of Israel to aid him in retrieving his home, which succeeded.

He showed his work in one-man shows in museums and galleries in Europe, the Americas, South Africa and Asia, returning periodically to Israel. However, being outcast due to false rumours and the antagonism the traditional artistic establishment held toward him, he would be almost unable for a time to exhibit his works in Israel. In one such case, the director of the Tel Aviv museum, Moshe Kaniok refused to answer Frenel when the latter inquired if he could hold an exhibition, not having held one there since 1949. Frenel even published a notice in Israeli news, informing his admirers that he is forced in great regret to move his paintings overseas:

"Due to reasons out of my control, I cannot properly display some of my most important work to the wider public in Tel Aviv and Haifa (Due to the refusal of the museums) - therefore I am forced to move my work outside the country. To those interested in my work from 1934 onward, refer too..." .

The rejection by Israeli artists and institutions also reflected in his relative omission from Israeli art history books despite him being at the time the only Israeli painter included in Britannica and other international encyclopedias and despite his historic role.

He returned to Paris for most of the year using Tzfat/Safed as his summer home. In Paris living in La Rue Mouffetard, in the 5th arrondissement. Rolly Schaffer was one of his students in Safed. In 1973, his house reopened as a museum, the Frenkel Frenel Museum, showcasing his work. In July 1979, Frenkel had a one-man show at the Orangerie in Paris.

His Expressionist works pinpoint the expression of inner experience rather than solely realistic portrayal, seeking to depict not objective reality but the subjective emotions and responses that objects and events arouse in them. His colours reveal his hidden emotions and express passion and drama. When he paints his wife Ilana, the colours express an erotic explosion.

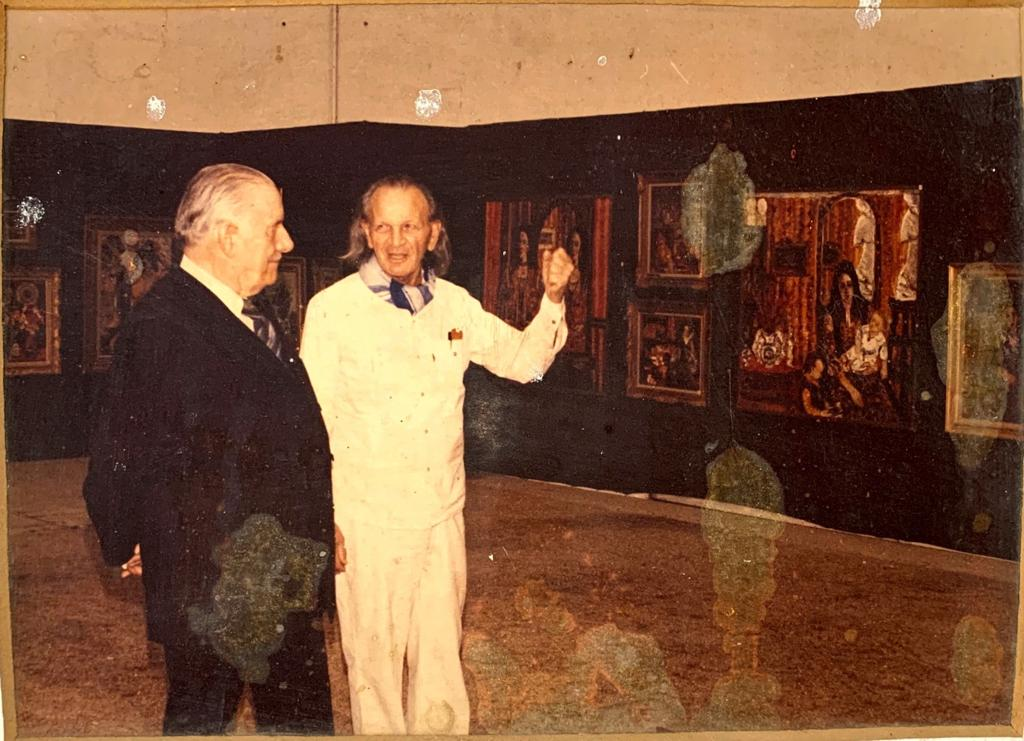
The Artist with the President of the Senate, Alain Poher, in the Orangerie Exhibition, 1979, Paris

In 1972, he was awarded with the Grand Prix de Paques (nude), Grand Prix de Noel (expressionism) 1972 and in 1972 with the Grand Prix de Deauville and Grand prix International de Peinture de la Côte d’Azur en France Finale. By the late 1970s it is said he had already produced more than 20,000 artworks.

In 1979 he had a solo show at the famous "Orangerie" of Paris, in celebration of his 80th birthday; inaugurated by the President of the French Senate, Alain Poher.

Frenkel who strove to become in his youth a sculptor saying thus "I wanted to be a sculptor, like Michelangelo, but I had problems with the patina", feeling unsatisfied with his sculpture"; Frenkel would only consistently exhibit sculpture, in particular bronze reliefs, toward the end of his life. Some of these sculptures expressed a rather Jewish pathos.

When asked what he thought of new young artists who have left him behind he replied: "Excellent" and added "To my son I said, rebel, civilization is the rebellion of the sons against their parents".

In the 1970s, when interviewed by Amnon Barzel, regarding his artistic style he said the following: "To me, materiality, is important, not of the subject of the colour,, the material that makes the painting. What does the artist do? Takes raw material and turns it a material of which we do not know its element". Frenel recounted to Barzel his belief in the importance of an artist using his intellect. Regarding his nude paintings, Frenkel said of his art: "Like Delacroix's, but with Jewish sadness, with love".

He died in 1981 in Tel Aviv and was buried in Safed.

== Awards and commemoration ==
Frenkel won the Dizengoff Prize for painting four times, in 1938, 1939, 1940 and again in 1948. He took part in the 24th and 25th Venice Biennales, firstly a pre-independence exhibit and then represented the first time Israel participated.

- Dizengoff Prize (Tel Aviv) 1935;1938;1939;1940;1948
- Beaux-Arts Commission prize (Paris)
- Honour Certificate for nude-painting (Venice Biennale) 1948
- 1st Prize for Litography-French pavilion-in the International Lithography Exhibition (Bruxelles Belgium) 1958
- Grand prix de Paques(nude) 1972
- Grand prix de Noel (expressionism) 1972
- Grand prix International de Peinture de la Côte d’Azur en Frande Finale 1973
- Grand prix International de Deauville 1973

== Exhibitions ==
- 1950: Venice Biennale
- 1924: Salon des Indépendants, Paris
- 1924: Salon d'Automne
- 1924: Salon de Société des Artistes Indépendants
- 1925: Salon des Indépendants, Paris
- 1950-1964 Romanet Gallery, Paris
- 1954 Johannesburg - Durban - Cape Town
- 1957: O'Hana Gallery, London
- 1959 Max Bollag Gallery, Zürich
- 1962: Gallery of Drap d'Or, Cannes
- 1965 - Continental Gallery, New York City
- 1967 - LIM Gallery, Tel Aviv
- 1969: Stenziel Gallery, Munich
- 1970: WESTART Gallery, New York City
- 1972: Artistique International Gallery, Nice
- 1973: Aqua Vella Gallery, Caracas
- 1973: IBAM gallery, Rio de Janeiro
- 1974: Galerie de Seine 38, Paris
- 1974: Galerie Karsenty, Monaco
- 1974: GAllery ALTULIDADES, São Paulo
- 1975: Galerie Vendome, Paris "Hommage to Chagall"
- 1975: Jean Apesteguy Gallery, Deauville
- 1975: Museum of Art, Lima
- 1976: Artistes Français
- 1977: Israel Linke gallery, Amsterdam
- 1977: Gallery Galjoen, Hertogenbosch
- 1979: One man Show, Orangerie, Paris, inaugurated by President of French Senate

== Gallery ==

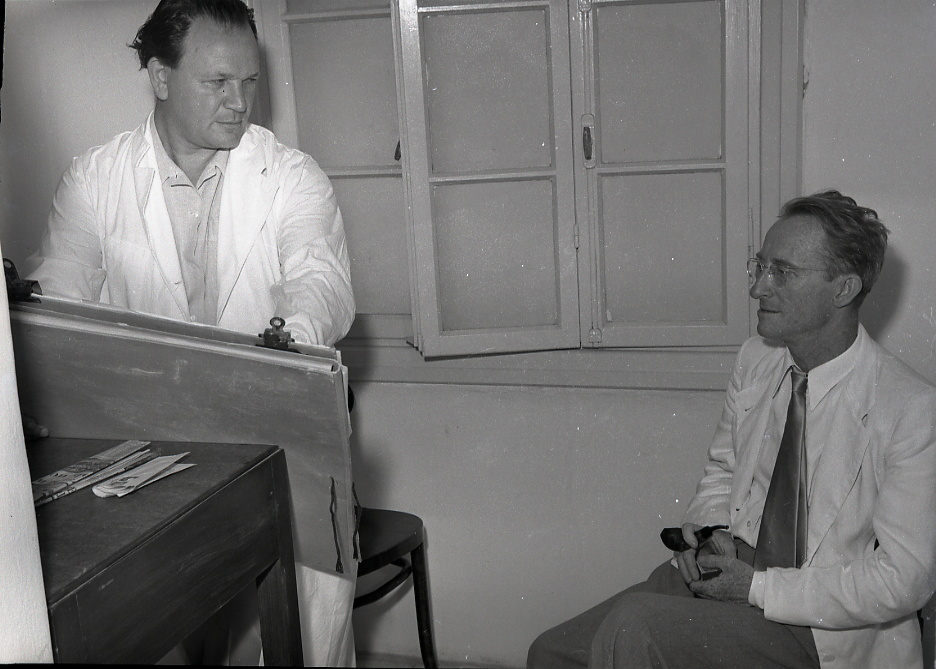
Frenkel and Uri Zvi Greenberg in Tel Aviv

== See also ==
- Visual arts in Israel
- Beit Castel
- Shimshon Holzman
- Frenkel Frenel Museum
