= Ben Yehuda Street (Tel Aviv) =

Street in Tel Aviv, Israel

Coordinates: 32.0843°N 34.7721°E

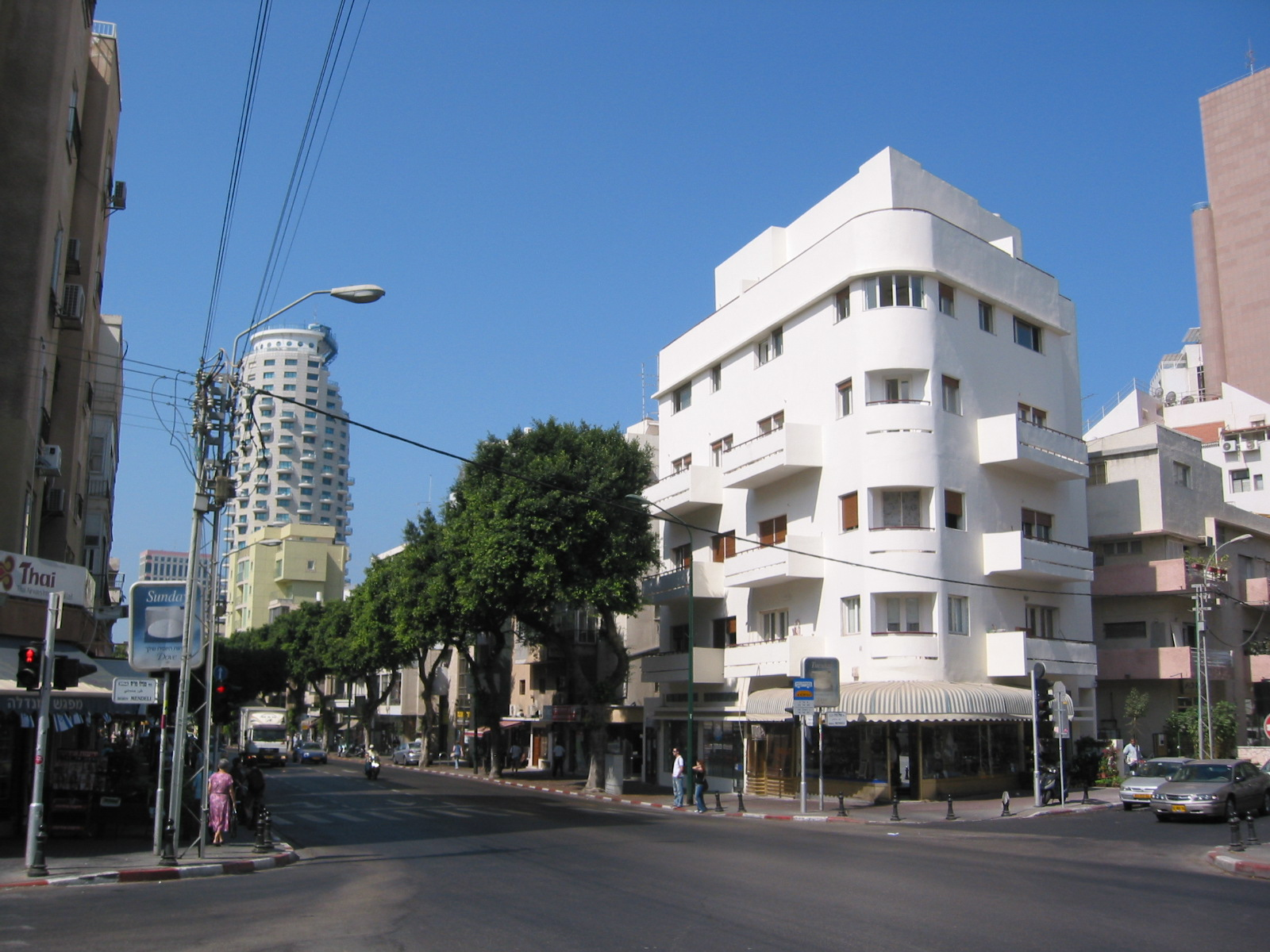
Ben Yehuda Street, Tel Aviv

Ben Yehuda Street is a street in Tel Aviv, Israel. The street runs from an intersection with Allenby Street, northwards intersecting where it runs roughly with the sea front to the west and Dizengoff Street to the east. At the northernmost end, it joins with Dizegoff Street, near Yarkon Park. The street is named after the founder of Modern Hebrew, the Litvak lexicographer and newspaper editor Eliezer Ben-Yehuda. In 1958, the first supermarket was opened on Ben Yehuda Street.

Ben Yehuda Street (Hebrew: Rehov Ben-Yehuda) is characteristically known for its cafés, restaurants and supermarkets. Many up-scale hotels are located on the upper side of the street.
