= Hanna Rovina =

Russian-Israeli actress (1888–1980)

- חנה רובינא
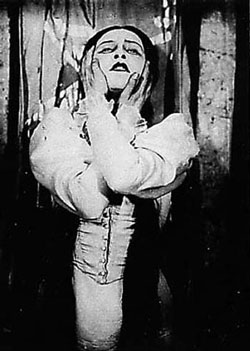
- Hana Rovina in The Dybbuk (1920)
- Born: 15 September 1888; Byerazino, Minsk Governorate, Russian Empire
- Died: February 3, 1980 (aged 91); Ra'anana, Israel
- Citizenship: Russian; Israeli
- Occupation: Actress
- Spouse: Moshe Halevy
- Partner: Alexander Penn
- Children: Ilana Rovina

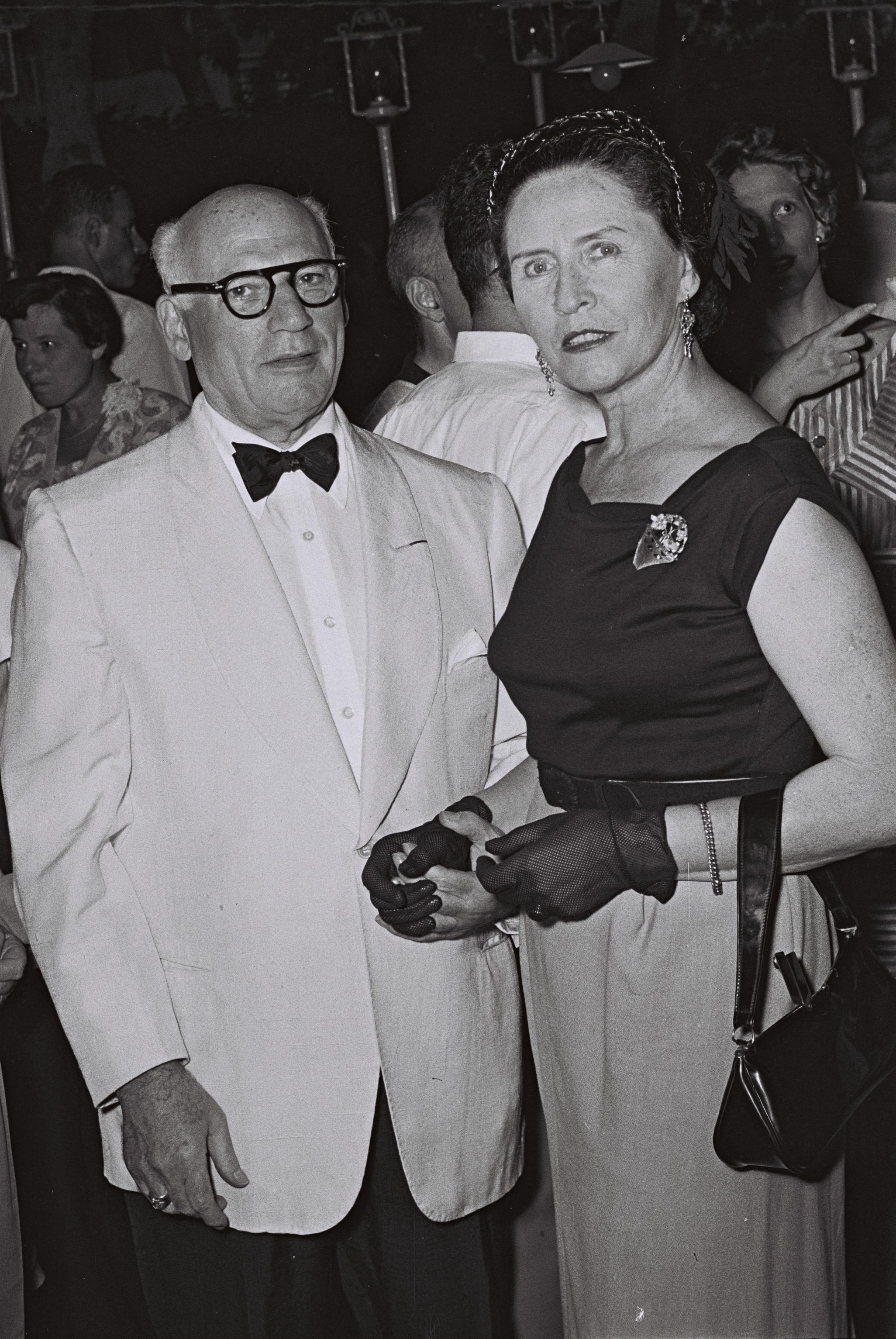
Sol Hurok and Hana Rovina (1954)

Hanna Rovina (Hebrew: חנה רובינא; 15 September 1888 – 3 February 1980), also Rubina, was a Russian-Israeli actress. She is often referred to as the "First Lady of Hebrew Theatre".

== Biography ==
Hana Rovina (Rubina) was born in Byerazino, Igumensky Uyezd, Minsk Governorate, Russian Empire (present-day Belarus), to David Rubin, a timber merchant and Sarah-Rivka Rubin. She had one sister, Rahel and one brother, Zvi. She trained as a kindergarten teacher at a course for Hebrew-speaking kindergarten teachers in Warsaw (prior to the First World War).

She had a daughter, Ilana, born in 1934, with the Hebrew poet Alexander Penn.

== Acting career ==
She began her acting career at the "Hebrew Stage Theatre" of Nahum Zemach. She joined Habima Theatre in 1917 just as it was being launched, and participated in its first production, a play by Yevgeny Vakhtangov. She became famous for her role as Leah'le, the young bride who is possessed by a demon in The Dybbuk by S. An-sky.

In 1928, Rovina and the other actors of Habima immigrated to Mandate Palestine. Habima became the flagship of the new national theatre movement, and Rovina was recognized as the movement's leading actress. The image of Rovina in her role as Leah in the Moscow performance of The Dybbuk, in a white dress, with her long black braid, became an icon of the emergent Hebrew theatre.

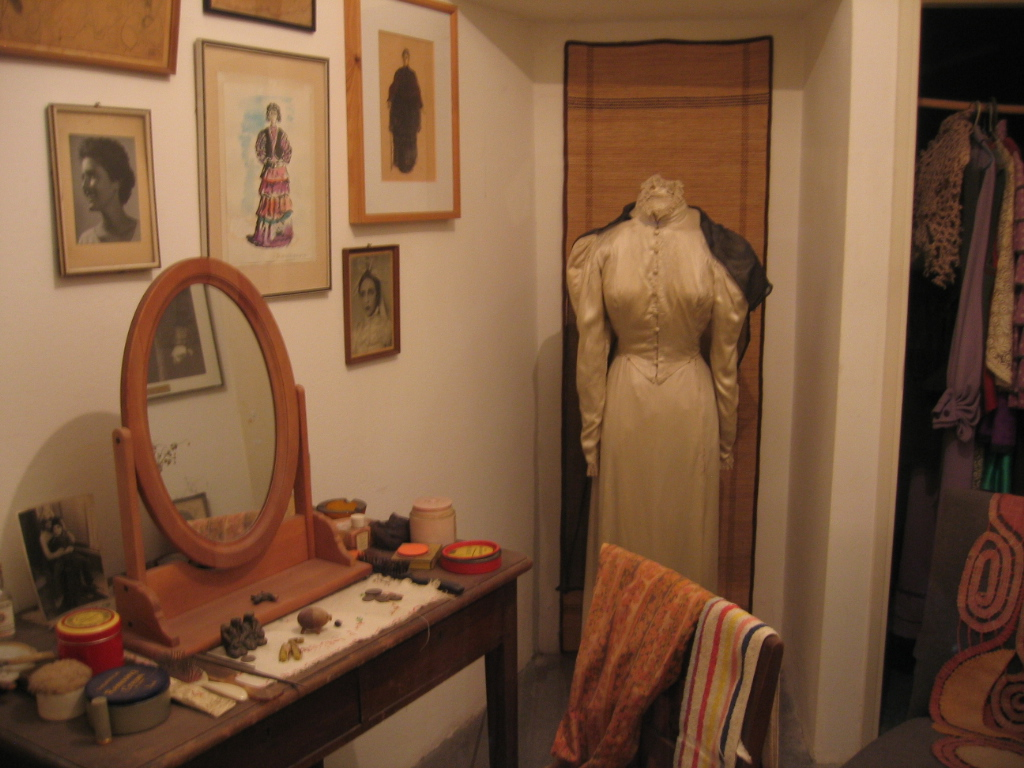
Rovina's dressing room at Habima Theatre

Rovina took her acting very seriously and tried to live the life of the character, as prescribed by the Stanislavski School.

Nisim Aloni wrote a play, Aunt Liza, especially for her and Rovina played the lead.

Rovina made high demands of her audience. She frequently stopped a play in the middle if she felt that the audience was not attentive enough. In one instance, she stopped the play Hannah Senesh in the middle of a scene and told the teenagers in the hall to stop eating sunflower seeds.

She remained active on stage until her death, in 1980. She died in Ra'anana, aged 91.

== Awards and recognition ==
Rovina was awarded the Israel Prize for theatre in 1956.

== Legacy in popular culture ==
In 2008, the play Was or Was Not, written by Edna Mazia and directed by Omri Nitzan, premiered at the Cameri Theatre. The play depicts the turbulent love story between Rovina and Alexander Penn.

In 2025, the film The Rovina Legacy was released. Created by documentary director Sigal Rash, the film chronicles the lives of the Rovina dynasty: Hanna Rovina, her daughter - Ilana, and her granddaughter. Utilizing extensive archival footage, the film explores the complex and intricate relationship spanning the three generations.

The experimental music project Mädchen June has dedicated two albums to Hanna Rovina. Hanna Habima and Dibbuk

== Gallery ==
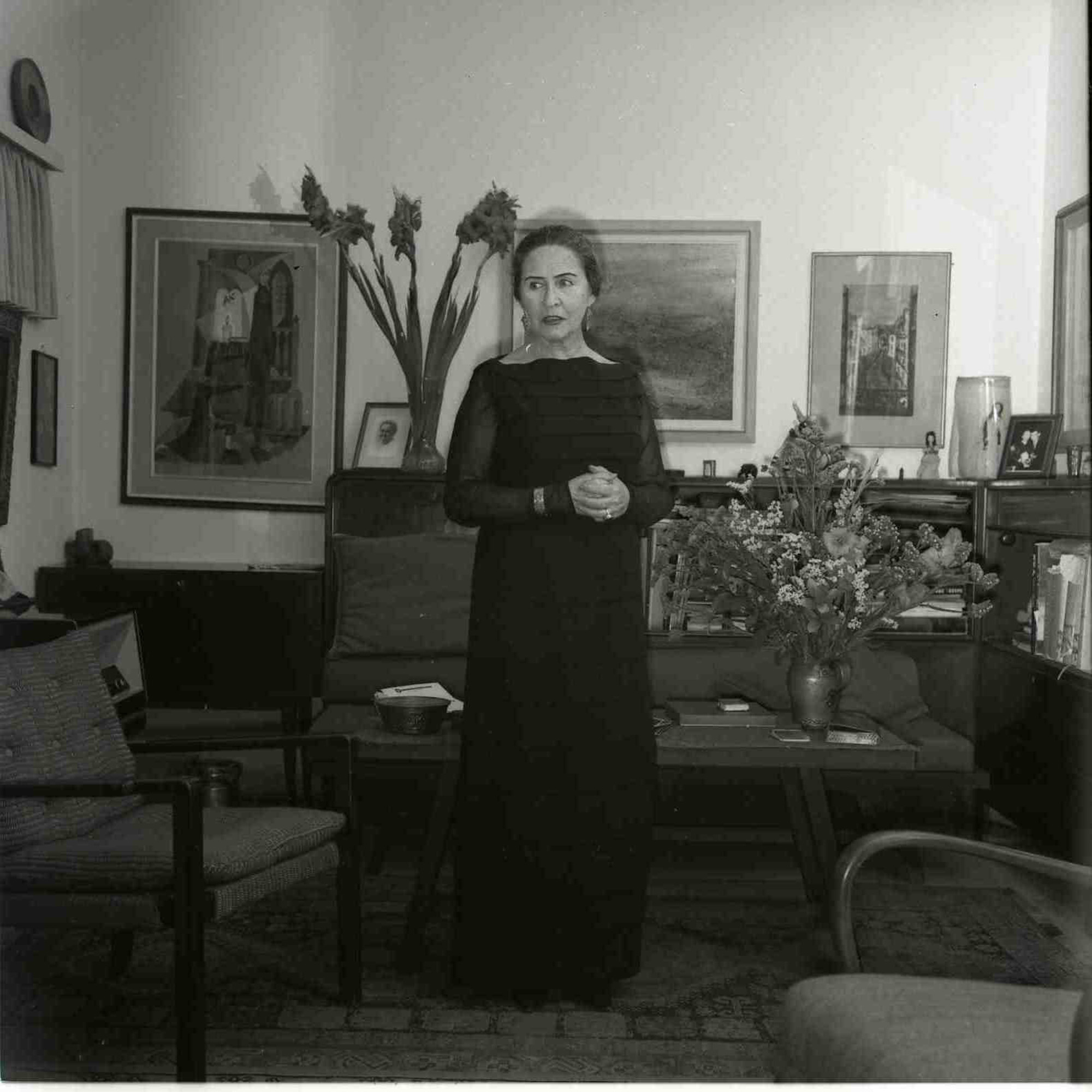
Hanna Rovina

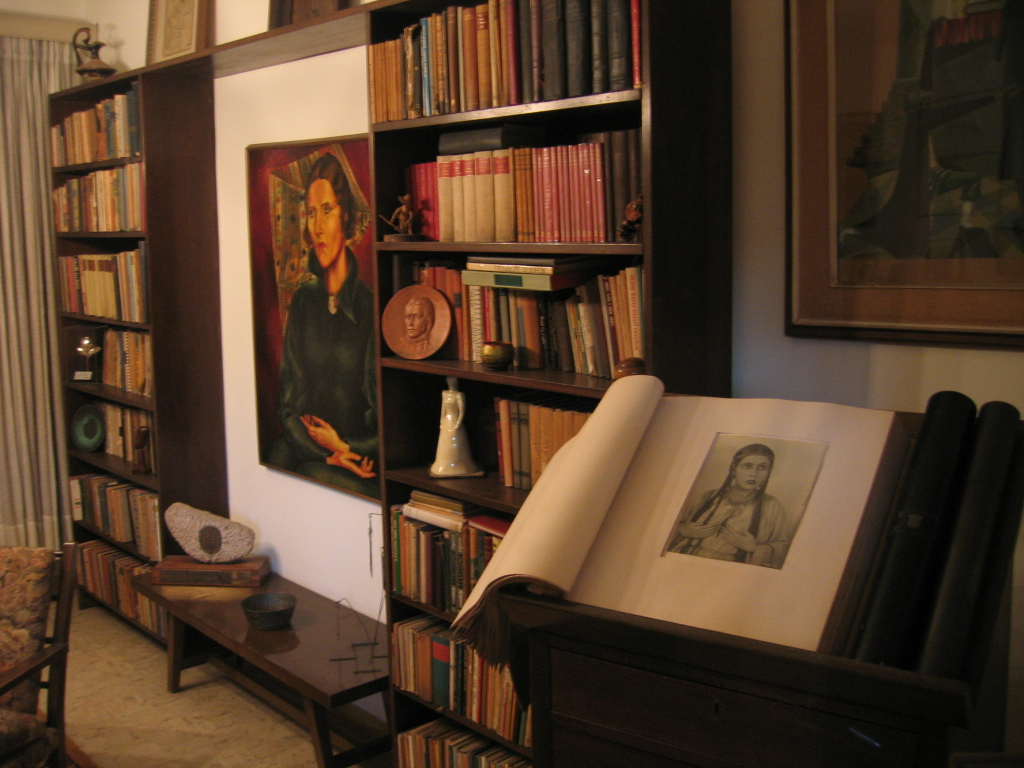
Rovina's room in Habima theatre, Tel Aviv

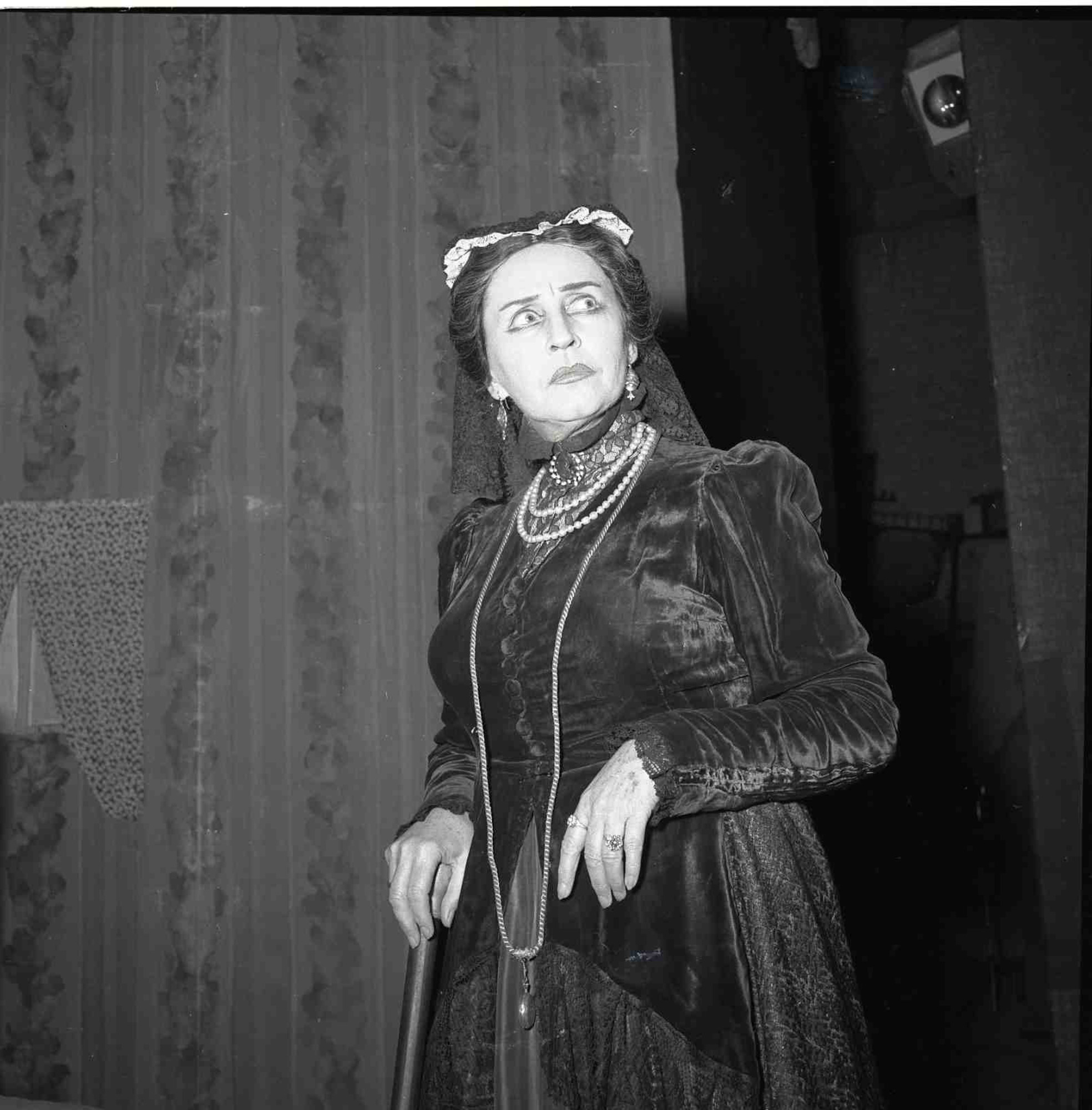
Hanna Rovina in Mirele Efros costume by Yitzhak Frenkel
