= Yehuda Karni =

Hebrew-language Israeli poet and journalist

- יהודה קרני
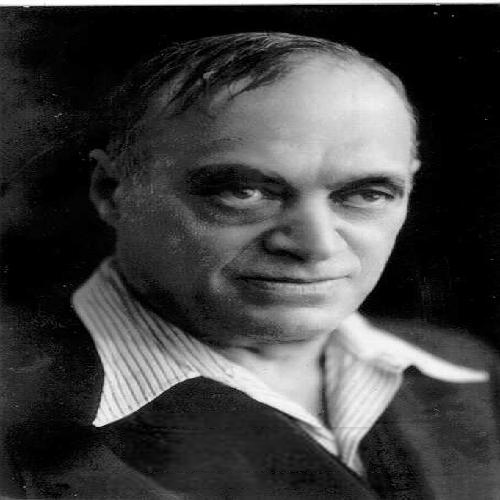
- Born: 1884; Pinsk, Imperial Russia (now Belarus)
- Died: 1949 (aged 64–65)
- Occupation: Poet
- Writing career
- Notable awards: Bialik Prize, 1944
- Movements: Hebrew Modernism, Hebrew literate expressionism

Yehuda Karni (né Wolowski; Hebrew: יהודה קרני; 1884–1949) was a Hebrew poet, journalist, editor, and translator. He was a recipient of the Bialik Prize in 1944. His poems about Jerusalem made a unique contribution to modern Hebrew poetry.

== Biography ==
=== Early life ===
He was born in Pinsk, in Belarus (then within the Jewish pale of settlement within the Russian Empire), in 1884, the son of Leah and Ezriel Zelig Wolowski, a diligent merchant, owner of forests and sawmills, and a public figure. He received a Jewish and general education. Karni began publishing poems at a very young age, initially in Hebrew and later in Yiddish and Russian as well. He was an active and dedicated member of the Zionist movement, elected as a delegate to the Zionist Congresses on behalf of the "Poale Zion" movement.

Karni combined journalistic writing, both in Hebrew and Yiddish, with his role as the secretary of the Zionist Center in Vilnius, Russia, during the years 1907–1908. His journalistic writing included poems, articles, reviews, and essays. He became known as a Hebrew poet laureate after Bialik published Karni's poem "Yesh Na'ara Tamara" in the "Hashiloah" magazine in 1908. Karni often contributed to the Zionist magazine "HaOlam" and briefly worked for the editorial team of a publication in Odessa, where he stayed for a short time and became acquainted with the group of Hebrew writers centered around Bialik and his associates.

=== 1920s in Eretz Israel ===
In 1921, he immigrated to the Land of Israel. During his early years in the country, he worked in Haifa and later moved to Tel Aviv. Initially in Israel, he worked as a clerk. Starting in 1924, he joined the newspaper "Haaretz," first as a reporter and later as a regular contributor and editorial team member. Among other contributions, he is considered a contributor to the renewal of the term "Kolnoa" (Cinema in Hebrew) in 1930 (for a brief period, talking films were referred to as Shma-Noa meaning, sound-motion pictures").

In Tel Aviv, he was part of the local Bohemian scene of artists and poets including Avraham Shlonsky, Isaac Frenkel, Natan Alterman and others who frequented cafes.

=== Later life ===
During his work at "Haaretz," Karni published numerous lists, comments, short political poems, articles, and essays. His enthusiastic and bewildered Zionist poetry, which he brought with him from Eastern Europe, underwent a profound change in the Land of Israel. He wrote poetry that grasped the stony landscape of the land. His Jerusalem poems held a prominent place in his work. He attempted to capture the essence of Jerusalem: the earthly and stony aspect on one side, and the messianic Jewish aspect on the other. His writing style was traditional and somewhat archaic, and he did not connect with the new wave in Hebrew poetry brought by Shlonsky, Alterman, Goldberg, Retzsh, and others. Karni turned to expressionist writing when describing the landscapes of the land of Israel.

After his death, streets were named after him in Ramot Aviv Bet neighborhood Tel Aviv and Ramot neighborhood in Jerusalem.

He was buried in Trumpeldor Cemetery, in Tel Aviv.

== Selected works ==
- Titles, Poems, Berlin: Dvir, 1923.
- In the Gate of Your Birthplace, Piyyutim, Tel Aviv: Ahiezer, 1935.
- Jerusalem, Song Cycle, Merhavya: Sifriyat Poalim, 1944.
- Song and Tear, Compositions for Literature, 1945.
- In a Small Stage: Prose and Poetry, Tel Aviv: Dvir, 1951.
- Yalkut Shirim, Collected, Edited, and Added Introduction and Explanations by Yitzhak Ogen, Tel Aviv: Yachdav, 1966.
- Poems, Edited and Added Introduction by Dan Miron, Jerusalem: Mosad Bialik, 1992.
