= Ohel Theatre =

Theatre

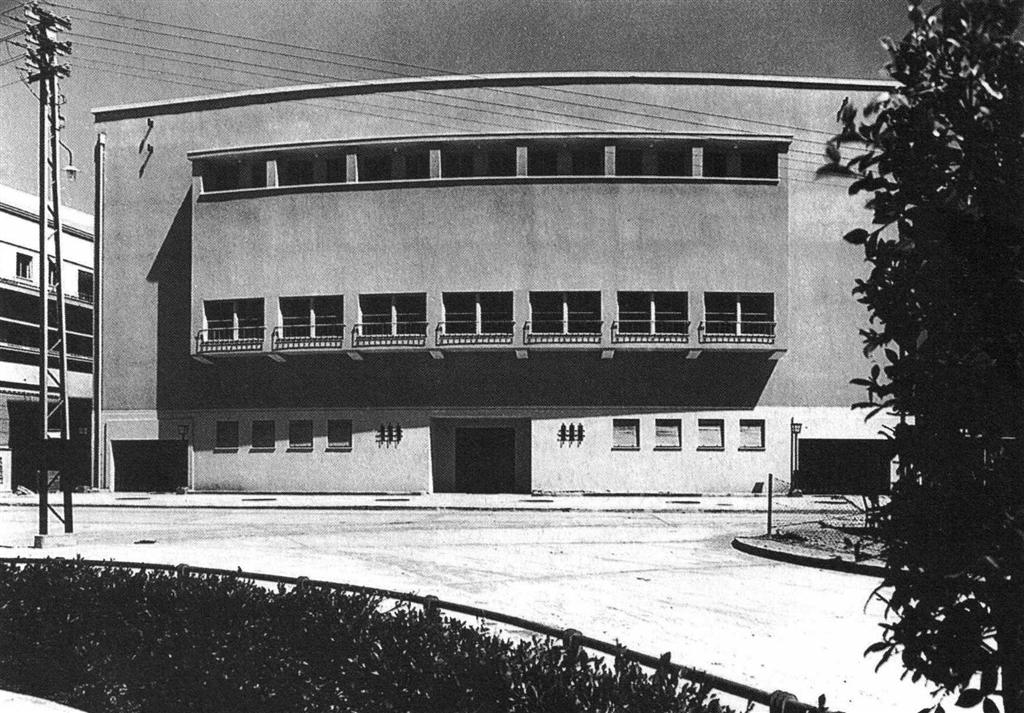
Ohel Theatre, 1940s

Ohel Theatre (Hebrew: תיאטרון אֹהל, Teat'ron 'Ohel) was a Hebrew-language theatre company, active between 1925–1969 in Mandate Palestine and Israel.

== History ==
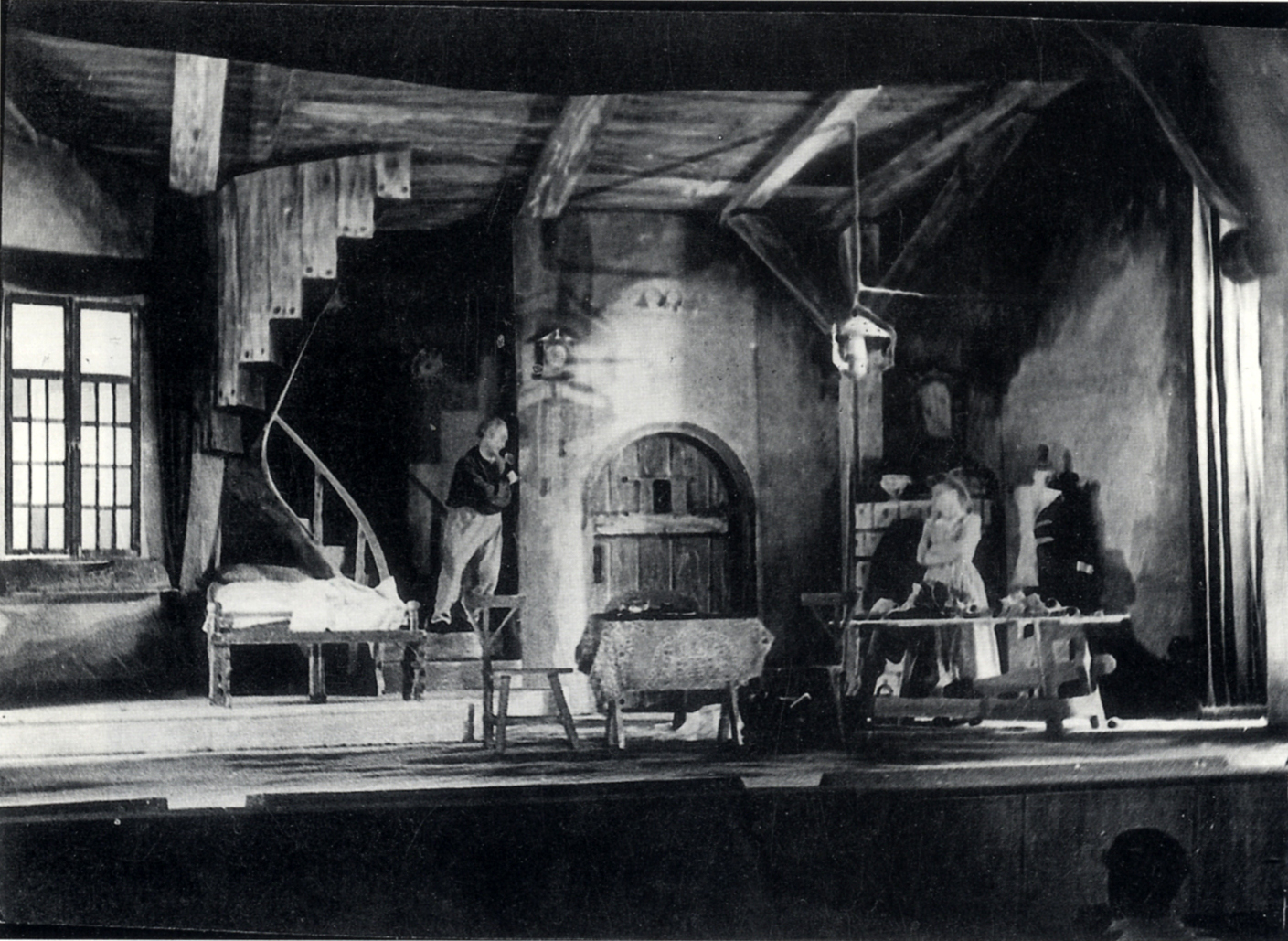
Ohel production, 1947

Ohel (Hebrew for "tent"), originally known as the Workers' Theatre of Palestine, was established in 1925 as a socialist theatre: members of the company combined acting with farming and industrial labour. The theatre, founded by Moshe Halevy, who had been a founding member of Habimah in Moscow, was organised as a collective.

The theatre's first production was a Hebrew adaptation of stories by the Yiddish writer I. L. Peretz. Peretz's Parties depicted the decadence of life in the Diaspora, compared to new Jewish life in the Land of Israel. In 1926 it hosted the Modern Artists' exhibition, the first show of modern art in Mandatory Palestine. In 1927, it staged Dayagim ("Fishermen"), a socialist play about the exploitation of fishermen by entrepreneurs.

Set designers who worked with the company in its early years were European-trained painters and architects, among them architect Aryeh Elhanani, expressionist painter Israel Paldi and Menachem Shemi, Yitzhak Frenkel a painter of the Paris school, as well as other important artists such as Reuven Rubin and Arie Aroch.

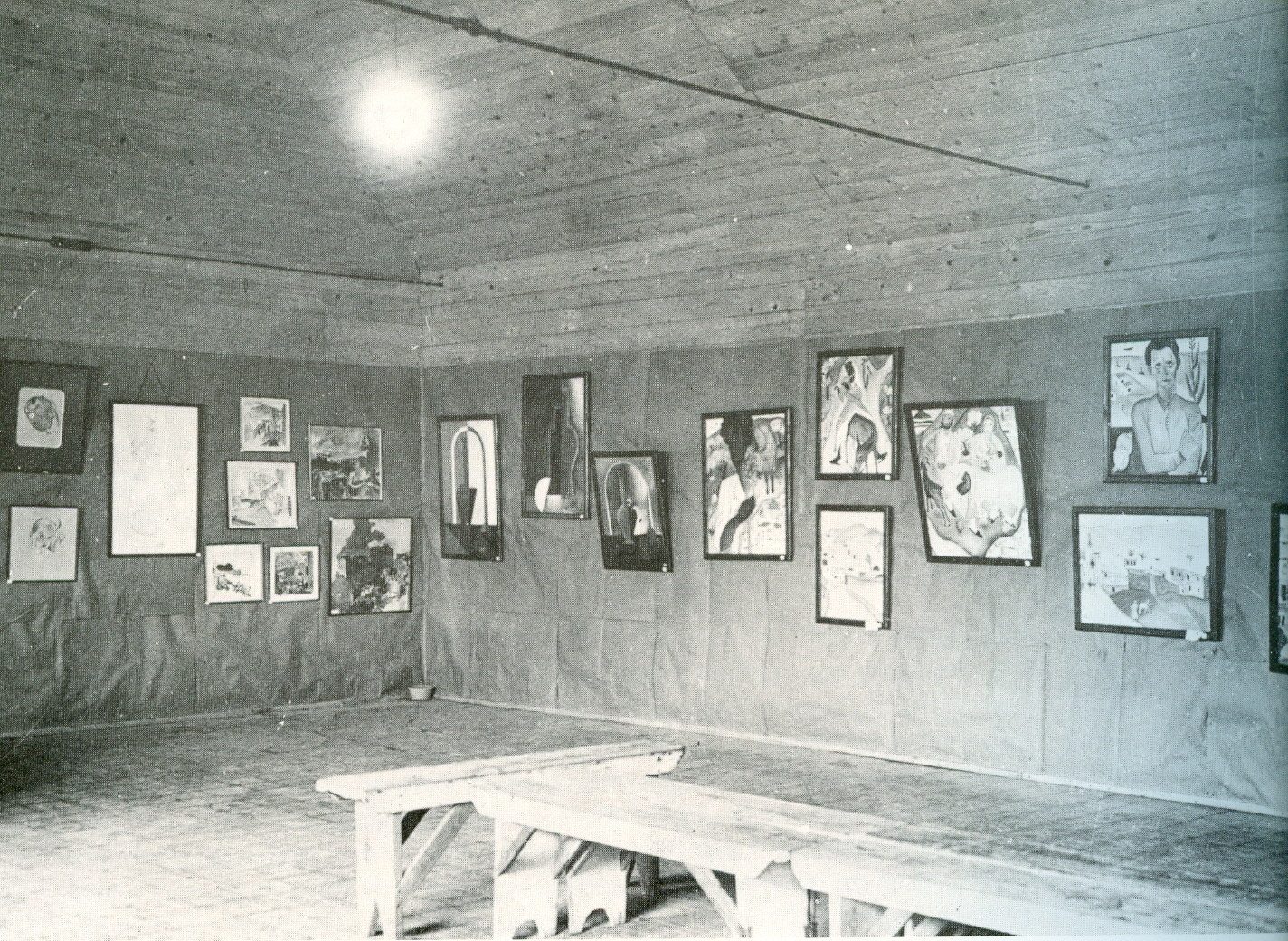
The first modern art exhibition hosted by the Ohel, in 1926, organized by the Histadrut art studio in it was exposed the first abstract painting in Israel, by Yitzhak Frenkel

On a successful European tour in 1934, Ohel staged biblical and national plays. When the company returned to Palestine, it produced The Good Soldier Schweik (1935), one of its most successful offerings. In 1943 it premiered King Solomon and Shalmai the Cobbler, Nathan Alterman's Hebrew translation of a comedy by Sammy Gronemann, directed by the company's founder Moshe Halevy. In 1961, Ohel staged a comedy by Ephraim Kishon, Ha-Ketubbah ("The Marriage Contract"), which played for three seasons.

Until 1958, Ohel was the official theatre of the Histadrut, the General Labor Federation.

In 1964, under a new artistic director, Canadian-born Peter Frye, the company performed Ammekha by Scholem Aleichem, plays by Ionesco, Brecht, and young British playwrights. The theatre closed in 1969.

== See also ==
- Culture of Israel
