= Adloyada =

Procession held in Israel on the Jewish holiday of Purim

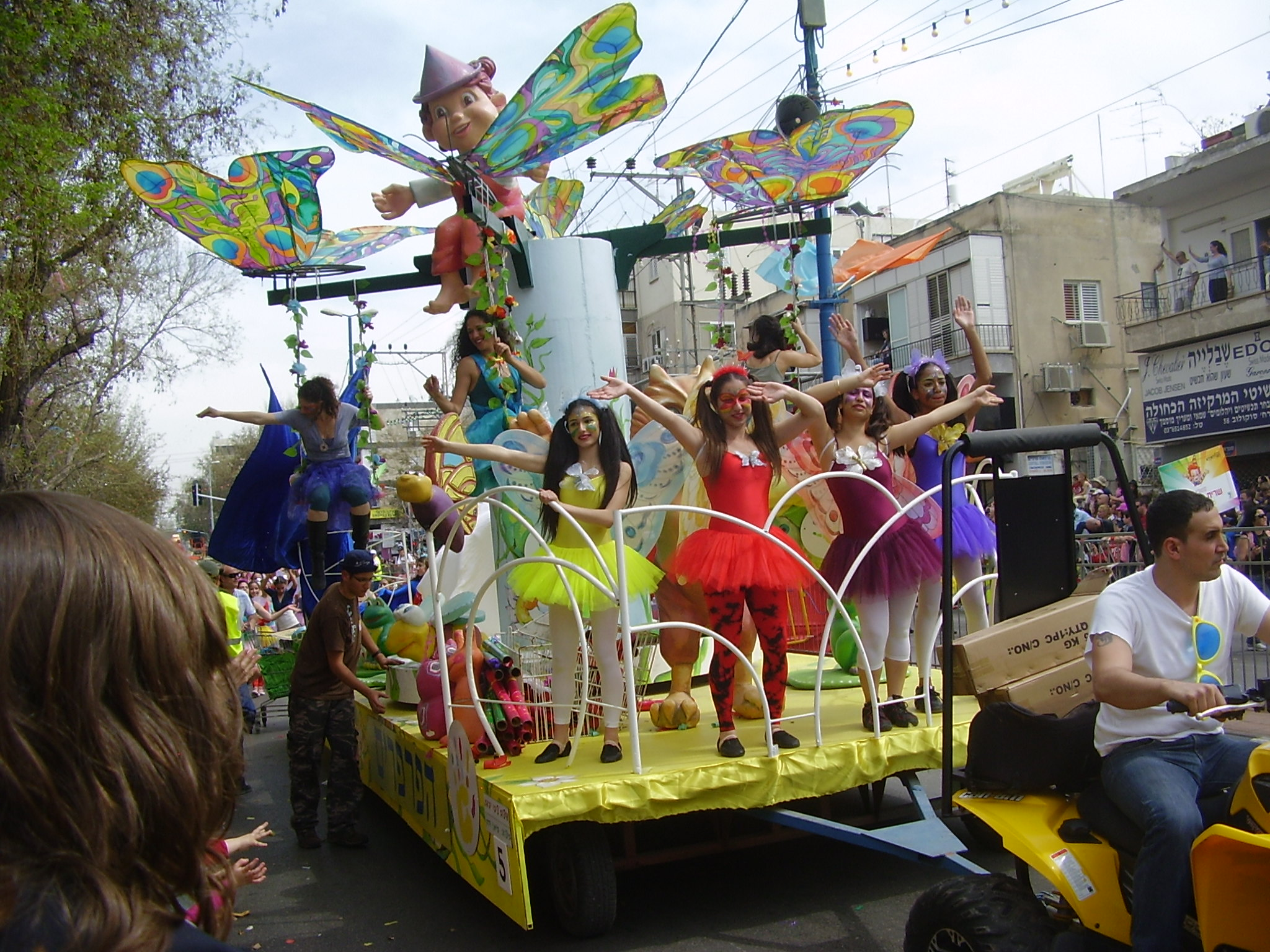
Adloyada parade in Holon, Israel, 2011

Adloyada (Note: Spelling variants: ad delo yada, ad lo yadah, ad lo yada, adloyadah, ad delo yadah, ad d'lo yada, ad d'lo yadah, adloyoda, adloyodah, ad lo yodah, ad delo yoda, ad delo yodah, ad d'lo yoda, ad d'lo yodah, ad loy yada, ad loy yadah, ad deloy yada, ad deloy yadah, ad d'loy yada, ad d'loy yadah, ad loy yodah, ad lo yoda, ad deloy yoda, ad deloy yodah, ad d'loy yoda, ad d'lo yodah, ad deloy yode, ad d'loy yode) (Hebrew: עדלאידע Hebrew pronunciation: [ˌʔadloˈjada] or Hebrew pronunciation: [ˌʕadloˈjadaʕ], lit. "Until one no longer knows") is a humorous procession held in Israel on the Jewish holiday of Purim (or on Shushan Purim the second day of Purim, commanded to be celebrated in "walled cities", nowadays only in Jerusalem).

The Adloyada parade is a tradition dating back to the early days of Tel Aviv, in 1912. During the days of the Yishuv, the Adloyada was a mass event; it was resumed after the state of Israel was reestablished.

The name is derived from the rabbinic saying in the Talmud that one should revel on Purim by drinking "until one no longer knows (Aramaic: עַד דְּלָא יָדַע ʿad dəlāʾ yāḏaʿ) the difference between 'blessed be Mordecai' and 'cursed be Haman'".

== History ==
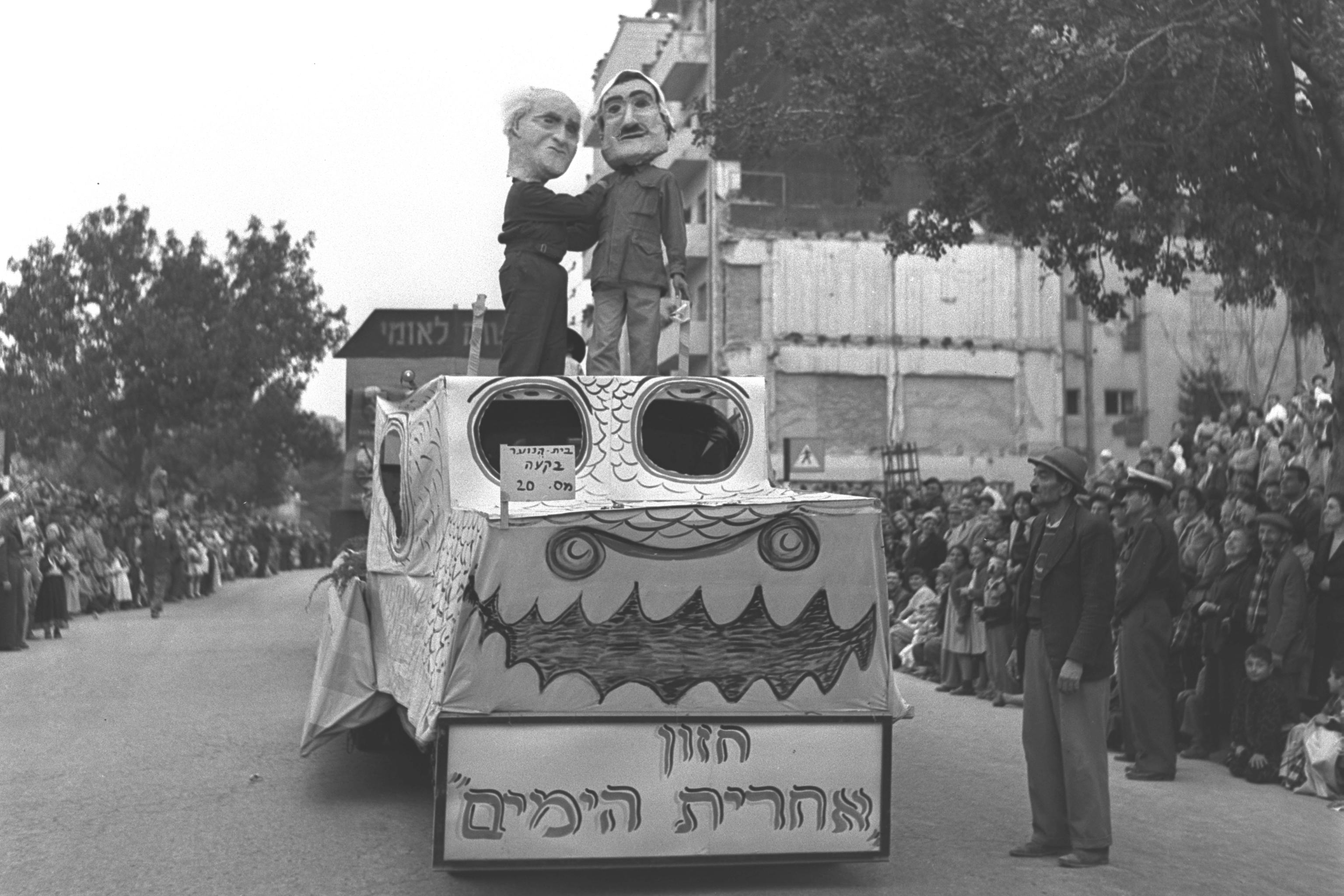
"David Ben-Gurion" and "Gamal Abdel Nasser" in the 1956 Adloyada parade in Tel Aviv

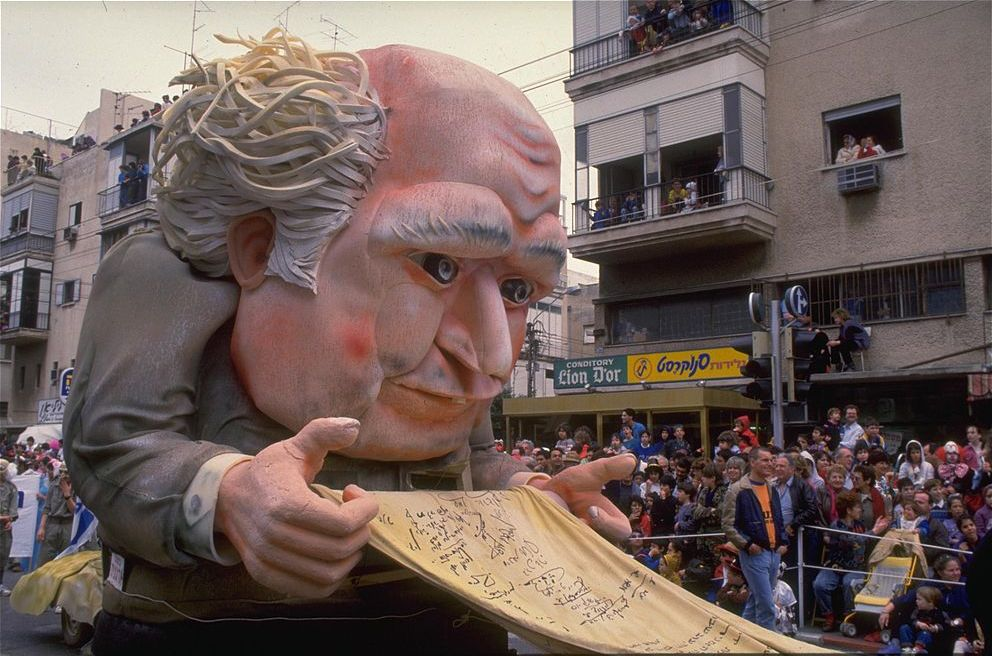
David Ben-Gurion float at the Adloyada parade, 1998

The first Adloyada parade was initiated by Avraham Aldema, a teacher and co-founder of "Hevre Trask" (Yiddish for "Noisy Buddies"), and was held in Tel Aviv during Purim in 1912. This parade was characterized by provocative costumes and pranks. According to several testimonies, the parade of 1912 was very colorful and beautiful. It consisted of giant puppets, a marching band and hundreds of children wearing their Purim costumes. Throughout the years, the parade became a permanent tradition of Purim. These events were held parallel to the famous celebrations that were organized by Baruch Agadati. Agadati's merriments had become extremely profitable, and so were criticized harshly by "Hevre Trask" for being over commercialized.

Tel Aviv's Adloyadas were complemented with luxurious Purim balls, created by Baruch Agadati. Throughout the years, the parades were expanded and their path was moved from Herzl Street to Allenby Street and to Ibn Gabirol Street upon the establishment of the state of Israel.

During the 1930s, Adloyadas had a specific theme, for example, “10 years of the National Home” (1928) or the tribes of Israel (in 1934).

The main carnival, despite its new name Adloyada, was characterized by a "proper" behavior. The municipality issued annual limitations on the Purim celebrations such as a prohibition to use explosives and dress up in costumes that may offend the Jewish religion or the Israeli nation. Despite the censorship and the sanctions, there were a few miscreants.

During the 1928 carnival, with the theme "10 years to the national home", Hevre Trask presented a 10-candle Menorah (as a symbol to Balfour's statement); instead of candles there was a rude gesture and the sign "free Aliya, Jews in the top clerical work". In one of the "Menorah" balls (Menorah was a club founded by veterans) in 1927, an Avraham Atkind won the costume competition for his costume: "balancing the clerk's salary in the Palestine government". Atkind's hat had a scale and a photograph of the residence of the British commissioner in the magnificent Augusta Victoria building in Mount Scopus, as well as a poem, expressing the discontent of the gap between the British clerk's salary and the salaries of local Israelis from all ethnic groups.

Gdud Meginei Hasafa (Hebrew: גדוד מגיני השפה, Battalion for the Defence of the Language), an organization in Tel Aviv fighting to make Hebrew the common language in Mandatory Palestine, used Purim to present and to flood the streets with written propaganda. The Gdud documents were distributed during the Purim carnival. In addition, the Gdud held an annual costume competition with the theme of the superiority and importance of the Hebrew language. In the carnival of 1929, the Gdud presented the "tower of Babylon"; a tower on top of a horse-drawn cart with the slogan "revival of the language, revival of the people" and "words can kill".

In the main carnival of 1933, there was a puppet of Hitler riding a horse, as part of the parade. On its neck there was a sign saying; "kill Jews" and next to it there were two Jews bleeding to death. The German consul in Jerusalem sent a letter to Tel Aviv Mayor Meir Dizengoff in the matter and demanded an apology, but Dizengoff replied that Purim is a stage for free speech of public opinion. A year later, a huge puppet was presented with a swastika on its back.

In 1935, a giant puppet was built, named "the profiteering monster". On the day of festivities, a public trial was held for the puppet, during which Dizengoff, Menachem Ussishkin, Chaim Weizmann and Yehoshua Hankin ruled that the monster was guilty of various crimes including fraud, spending the people's wealth, and destruction of the achievements of the pioneers.

Adloyada was discontinued in 1936 due to the 1936–1939 Arab revolt in Palestine and subsequent turbulent events in the world and the area.

=== After the establishment of the State of Israel ===
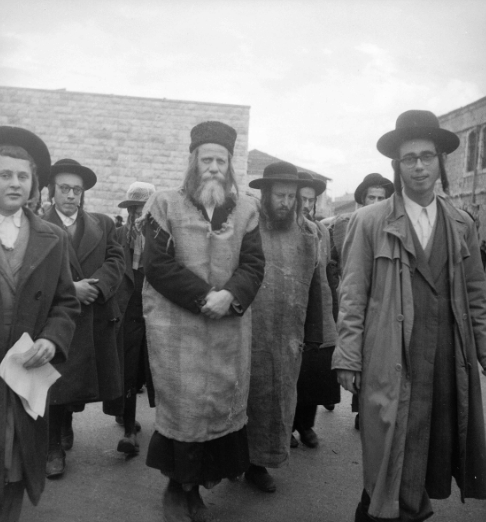
Anti-Zionist dissident Rabbi Amram Blau protesting against Adloyada, 1956

The Adloyada tradition was renewed in the Purim of 1955. In this year there were over half a million of participants and spectators. In the late sixties, the tradition faded in Tel Aviv and the parade was transferred to Holon, although it lacked the unrefined feature of events in Tel Aviv.

Some, in particular haredi leaders disapproved Adloyada seeing them as contrary to the Torah values, exaggerating "lewd and drunken" misconduct of few.

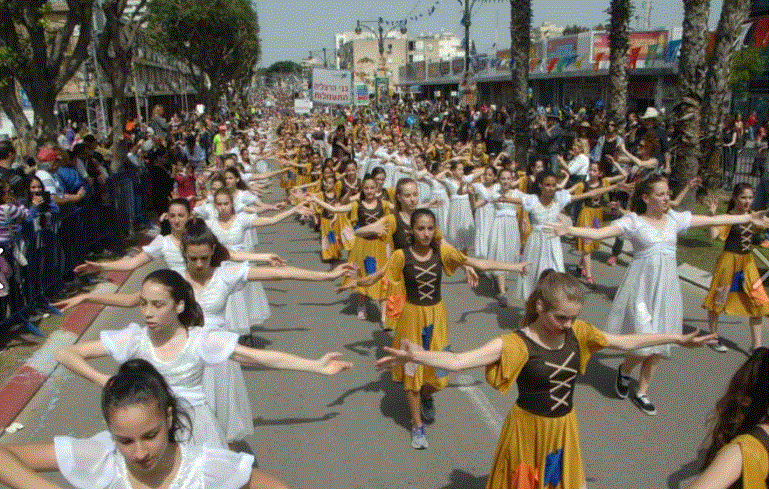
Adloyada in Herzliya, 2014

In the 1965 an "ArchiParhiTura" (also spelled ArchiParchiTura; Hebrew: ארכיפרחיטורה) procession was carried outin Haifa. It was a Purim parade which had giant displays made by Technion architecture students ("ArchiParhiTura" is the Hebrew combination of the words architecture and "archi parhi", a Talmudic expression of vagabond) and set on trucks. The parade went through Herzl Street in the Hadar Hacarmel area and was accompanied by an orchestra.

In the last few years, an attempt was made to return to tradition and resume the Adloyada as an important main event in different cities.

== Outside of Israel ==
A Purim parade has been held in Atlanta, Georgia since 1992. Purim carnivals, with or without a parade component, have been held in other cities.

== The name Adloyada ==
In the beginning, the parade was called "carnival". In 1923, a competition was held in order to find a new permanent name for the parade. Out of 300 submissions, author Isaac Dov Berkowitz's entry Adloyada was chosen.

Adloyada means reaching a state of total intoxication. The expression comes from the Aramaic expression stated by Rabbah in the Babylonian Talmud, Tractate Megilla: "It is the duty of a man to mellow himself ... on Purim until he cannot tell the difference between 'cursed be Haman' and 'blessed be Mordecai'." This means that people should drink on Purim until he reaches a state of not being able to distinguish between the evil Haman and the blessed Mordecai.

Among the other submitted suggestions were Hayim Nahman Bialik's entry "Pura", Tchernichovsky's entry "Astoret" and Avraham Shlonsky's entry "Tzahalula".

== See also ==
- Culture of Israel
