= History of Tel Aviv =

From founding in 1909

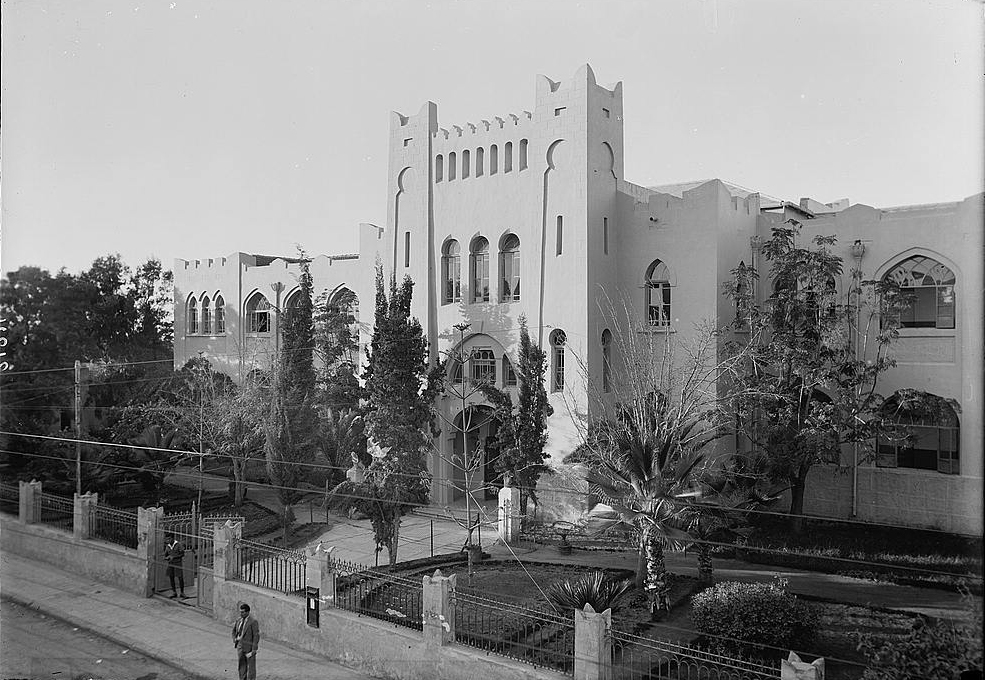
The Herzliya Hebrew Gymansium, on Herzl Street, Tel Aviv. The school was the first monumental structure of Tel Aviv and its focal point.

The city of Tel Aviv, known as "the first Hebrew city", was established as the realization of the Zionist vision of Theodor Herzl and is the second largest city in Israel, after Jerusalem. Before the establishment of the Tel Aviv neighborhood, the Jews of Yaffo settled for building Jewish neighborhoods outside of Yaffo. The official founding year of the neighborhood, 1909, marks the year when lots were drawn, and the first houses were built which would later become known as the independent Hebrew city, first called "Ahuzat Bayit" and later renamed Tel Aviv, after the Hebrew translation of Herzl's book Alteneuland (meaning old new land). The city has also been known by its nicknames: "Little Tel Aviv," "The White City," and "Garden City."

Tel Aviv would grow to become the cultural center of Israel with several prominent members of Odesa's Jewish cultural elite establishing themselves in the city, including Haim Nahman Bialik and the first mayor, Meir Dizengoff. In 1914, "Eden" opened as the first Israeli Cinema and Opera house. In 1925 with the establishment of the Histadrut art studio by Yitzhak Frenkel who brought the influence of French modern art, Tel Aviv soon eclipsed Jerusalem as Israel's art capital. Several theatres established themselves in Tel Aviv during the interwar period, including the Ohel Theatre, Habima Theatre and the Matate Theatre. In 1932, the Tel Aviv Museum of Art was first opened in Meri Dizengoff's home. In 1957, the Charles Bronfmann Auditorium was opened housing the Israel Philharmonic Orchestra and concerts.

== Jewish community in Yaffo ==
=== Yaffo's Jewish community ===
In 1825, during the period when the Ottoman Empire ruled over the Land of Israel, Rabbi Raphael Yehuda Menachem Levi, known as Yehuda Margosa, was appointed by the rabbis of Jerusalem to establish a Jewish settlement in Yaffo to receive Jewish immigrants, as he maintained good relations with the Ottoman authorities. At that time, there was no Jewish community in Yaffo, and Jews arriving through the port of Yaffo often suffered due to the lack of Jewish assistance. The rabbi's life in isolation, in a city without any other Jews, was far from comfortable or pleasant, even though he occasionally traveled to Jerusalem to stay there for a while. In 1829, the rabbi influenced 12 survivors of a ship carrying Jewish immigrants from Morocco that sank near Acre to become the first Jews to join him and settle in Yaffo. Over time, more Jews gathered in Yaffo, and the community came to include both Ashkenazim and Sephardim.

In 1834, the Jewish cemetery in Yaffo was purchased to spare the city's Jewish residents the need to transport their dead to Jerusalem. The establishment of this cemetery can, in fact, be regarded as the beginning of the Chevra Kadisha (Jewish burial society) of Tel Aviv-Yaffo.

In 1863, Rabbi Yehuda Margosa initiated the "City Committee for the Jews of Yaffo," which was the first public committee in the country not based on sectarian or communal divisions, with both Sephardim and Ashkenazim participating together. This committee was responsible for the religious and social affairs of Yaffo's Jewish community. From the early 1920s, the committee gradually transferred its authority to the Tel Aviv municipality and the Tel Aviv religious council, until it ceased to exist in May 1939.

=== Departure from Yaffo ===
In 1842, Rabbi Yehuda Margosa, together with Hakham Chaim Avraham Pinso and Hakham Yechiel Bekhar HaCohen, purchased a plot of land of 103 dunams outside the walls of Yaffo, on the banks of the Ayalon River, northeast of Yaffo, today the Montefiore neighborhood and the Azrieli Towers. The rabbi planted an orchard there with 5310 trees, assisted by the American Clorinda Minor from the Protestant Millennialist Christian farm "Mount Hope."

In 1853, Rabbi Yehuda Margosa sent a letter to the British Jew Sir Moses Montefiore, former Sheriff of London, and wrote (originally in English):

"By the grace of God, I hereby declare that I am the first Israelite who came here to Yaffo, one of the tribe of Dan... I began alone to cultivate the land by planting a garden, as I am about to tell Your Excellency, and if I could accomplish my plan, I would cause other Jews to do as I do, following my example. But everyone knows that the beginnings of everything new are very difficult, and even the Muslims here were astonished to see a Jew cultivating the land... I will do all that I can to encourage agricultural labor among the members of my community, numbering seventy families. All this is written by the rabbi who is here, and he is the appointed leader of the Jews who pray to God for your welfare. Raphael Yehuda Menachem Levi, Yaffo, July 28, 1853."

Margosa continued to lead the community until he died in 1879.

In 1876, the first Jewish house outside the walls of Yaffo was built and inhabited by Chaim Shmuel Shmerling. The walls of Yaffo themselves were dismantled during that time.

In 1887, the first Jewish neighborhood outside the walls of Yaffo, Neve Tzedek, was founded, followed by additional neighborhoods: Neve Shalom in 1890, Mahane Yehuda in 1896, Mahane Yosef in 1904, and Ohel Moshe and Kerem HaTeimanim in 1906.

Altogether, eleven separate residential neighborhoods were established outside of Yaffo before Ahuzat Bayit (Tel Aviv) was founded.

== Ahuzat Bayit ==
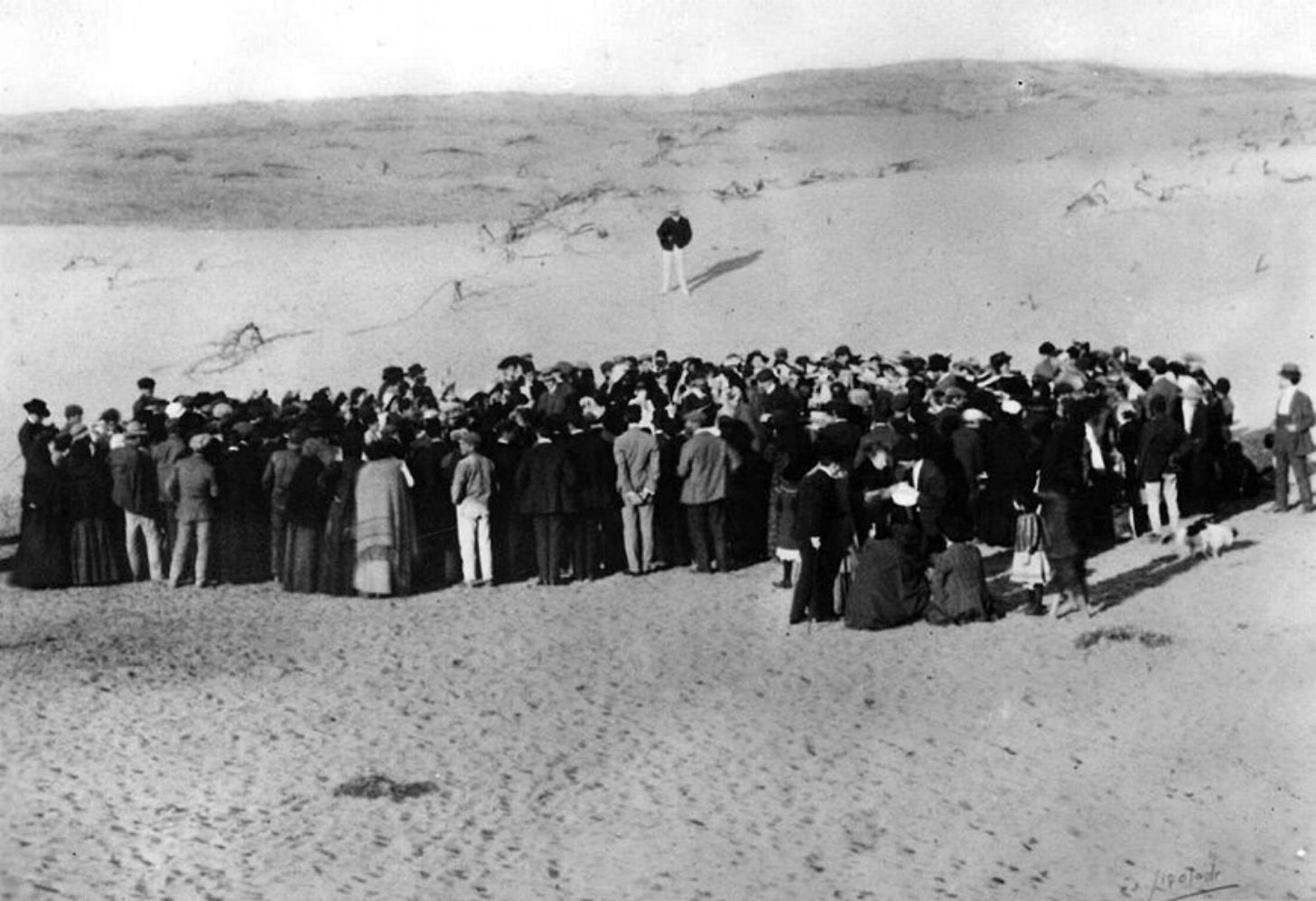
The foundation of Tel Aviv. A Lottery of seashells held among future Tel Avivians over lots, April 1909.

In 1906, a group of Jews from Yaffo decided to leave the city, driven by the desire to live independent Hebrew lives and to improve the harsh living conditions, which included overcrowding, filth, and the Ottoman decree that required Jews in Yaffo to change residences every year (the "Muharrem"). This group of Jews first convened in July 1906 and organized under the name "Society of Home Builders," later changed to "Ahuzat Bayit." At this meeting, they presented a plan for building a modern Hebrew city that would serve as a gateway to the Land of Israel for Jews around the world. The plan envisioned a city constructed according to the late 19th century Western European model.

The neighborhood the nucleus of the future city was located outside the walls of Yaffo, north of the railway line, on sandy lands of Kerem Gibli, purchased with the help of a loan from the Jewish National Fund. The neighborhood was founded in 1909 as a community of low-rise houses surrounded by gardens, under the name Ahuzat Bayit. The official founding date is April 11, 1909 (20 Nisan 5669), the day the lot-drawing ceremony with seashells was held for the neighborhood. The neighborhood contained a few streets, set perpendicular to one another. Its main street was Herzl Street, and at its northern end stood the Herzliya Hebrew Gymnasium (today the site of the Shalom Meir Tower), the first Hebrew high school. At the center of the neighborhood, Rothschild Boulevard was laid out in a valley where sand was cleared after leveling the dunes.

By the outbreak of World War I, Tel Aviv had only 140 houses, including two neighborhoods annexed to it: Nahalat Binyamin, located to the north along the street of that name (40 houses), and Hevra Hadasha ("New Society"), situated east of Tel Aviv along the coastal road, later to become Allenby Street (15 houses). During the war, the city's development came to a halt, and it suffered from a locust plague that destroyed all vegetation in the neighborhood, as well as from the persecution of the Ottoman authorities, especially Yaffo's governor, Hassan Bey. In April 1917, the Turkish authorities expelled their residents together with the Jewish residents of Yaffo.

The nostalgic term "Little Tel Aviv," coined by Haim Hefer and Dan Ben-Amotz during the 50th anniversary celebrations of Tel Aviv's founding, refers to Tel Aviv of those early years, which consisted mainly of the Neve Tzedek neighborhood and the area of Herzl, Rothschild, and Allenby streets. One of its central buildings was the Herzliya Hebrew Gymnasium.

== Cultural development of Tel Aviv ==
=== Art ===
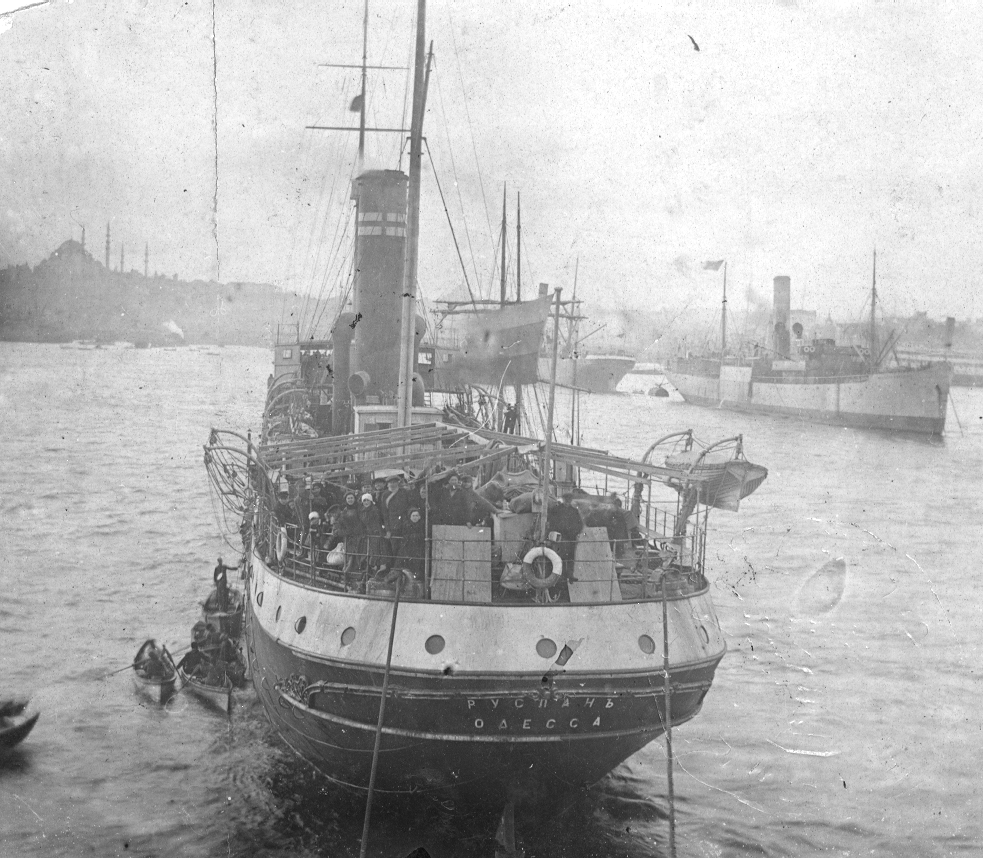
The Ruslan, whilst passing Istanbul

In 1919, the Ruslan, dubbed the "Zionist Mayflower" a ship carrying Jewish immigrants and refugees departed from Odesa, the cultural center of Eastern European Jewry and arrived in the port of Yaffo carrying on board numerous figures who would settle in Tel Aviv and become leading cultural figures in Israel's cultural scene. Among its passengers was the historian Joseph Klausner, the artists Yitzhak Frenkel and Chaim Glicksberg, the cartoonist Arieh Navon the architects Ze'ev Rechter and Yehuda Megidovitch, the art collector Jacob Pereman and others.

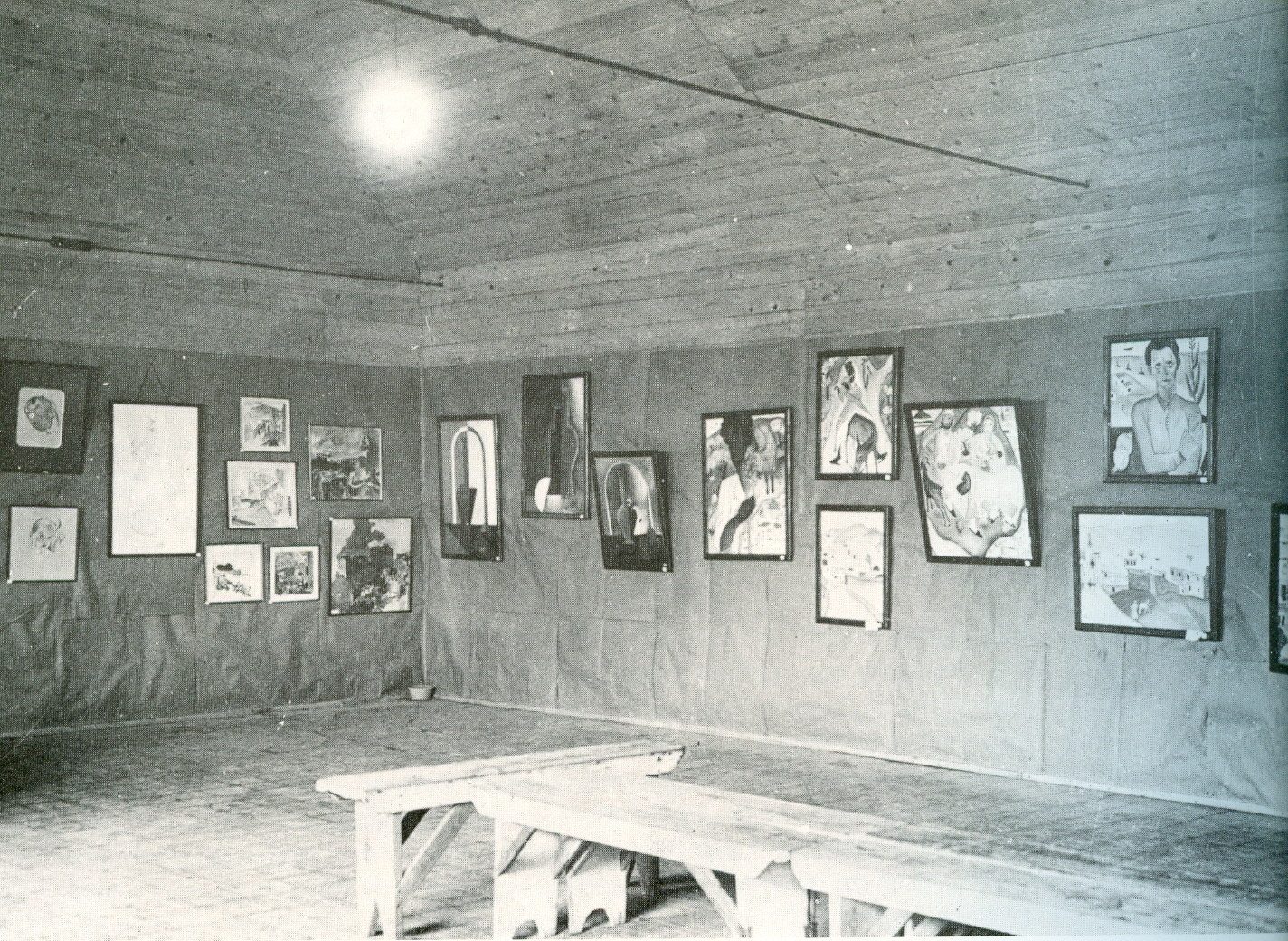
Modern Artists Exhibition at the Ohel Theatre, where Yitzhak Frenkel exhibited the first abstract artwork in Israeli history.

Pereman had brought with him a collection of 200 artworks, mostly post impressionist art works. In 1920 he, along with Joseph Constant organized the HaTomer, the first Jewish art cooperative of which Consant and his wife, Yitzhak Frenkel, Lev Halperin and Miriam Had Gadya were members. Frenkel and Constant taught art in the Herzliya Hebrew Gymnasium, among their students was Ziona Tagger. The cooperative had its first exhibition in 1920 however was cut promptly after a week due to a pogrom. The exhibition was a financial failure. Mayor Meir Dizengoff was only able to convince one person to purchase an artwork. Peremen subsequently opened "The Permanent Art Exhibition in the Land of Israel" in the first art gallery in Israel. The artists attempted to survive on the production of ceramics and odd painting jobs however due to financial difficulties Joseph Constant and Yitzhak Frenkel left to Egypt with Frenkel continuing to Paris. In 1924 Haim Nahman Bialik settled in Tel Aviv upon invitation by Meir Dizengoff.

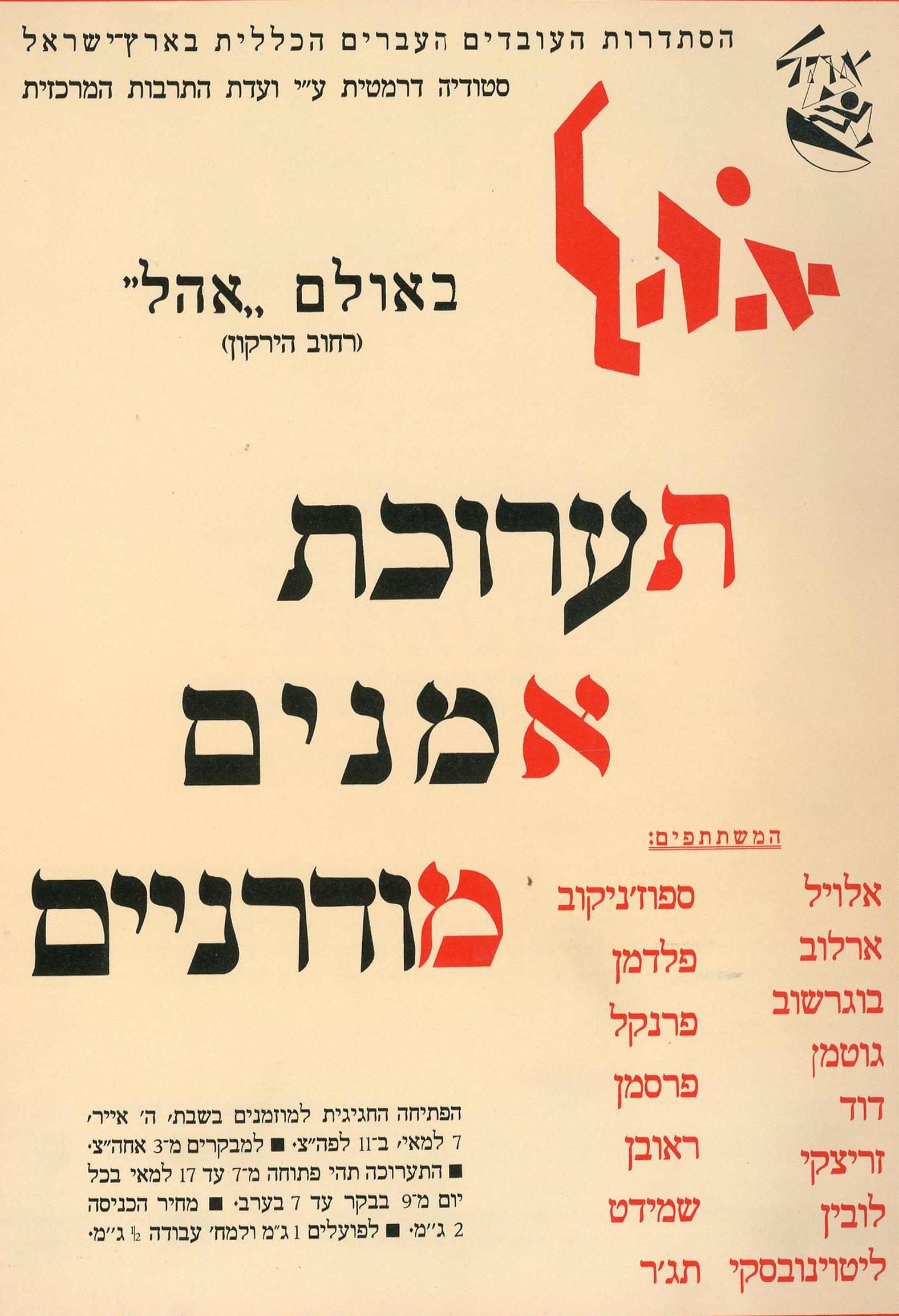
"Modern Artists Exhibition" in Ohel theatre, Tel Aviv poster.

In 1925, Yitzhak Frenkel returned from Paris and established the Histadrut art studio with the backing of the Histadrut. Frenkel was the first to bring modern art and the influence of the School of Paris to Israel. The studio pulled away students from Jerusalem's Bezalel and according to Gideon Ofrat led to Tel Aviv's eventual eclipsing of Jerusalem as the Yishuv's cultural center. Among students to have studied under Frenkel are Moshe Castel, Yehezkel Streichman, Avigdor Stematsky and others. At a time there were a total of 17 students, 6 of whom were female. The studio organized and took part in several exhibitions, including the "Modern Artists" exhibition in 1926 in the Ohel theatre. There, Frenkel exhibited the first abstract artwork in Israel. With the onset of the Great Depression and financial difficulties the studio closed in 1929. For several decades, the artists of Tel Aviv were heavily influenced by the French School of Paris.

In 1934, Meir Dizengoff organized the Dizengoff prize, awarded to leading artists. It would be Israel's highest art award until the introduction of the Israeli Prize. In te same year, Dizengoff gave the first floor of his home to the Tel Aviv Museum of Art, its first residence. Following Independence, several pupils of Frenkel including Yehezkel Streichman and Aharon Avni moved away from the School of Paris and established the Aharon Avni art institute in Tel Aviv.

In 1957 the Charles Bronfmann cultural center was built, housing concerts as well as the Israel Philarmonic. In 1959 the Helena Rubinstein Pavilion was opened. In 1971 the Tel Aviv Museum of Art relocated to Shaul HaMelech street. In 2018 it ranked 70th in the world in terms of number of visitors.

In the early 21st century, Florentin neighborhood became a magnet of local graffiti culture. Dede, Kis-Lev, Klone and other artists work in Tel Aviv. A local artist however told Times of Israel in 2020 that due to gentrification, the local artscene is drifting to other locations in Tel Aviv.

=== Sports ===
Maccabbi Tel Aviv football club was founded in the early 20th century. In 1923, HaPoel Tel Aviv sports club was founded, promptly disbanded and subsequently reformed in 1926. In 1936, Bnei Yehuda Tel Aviv was founded as a local HaTikva neighborhood, Yemenite football club.

== British Mandate period ==
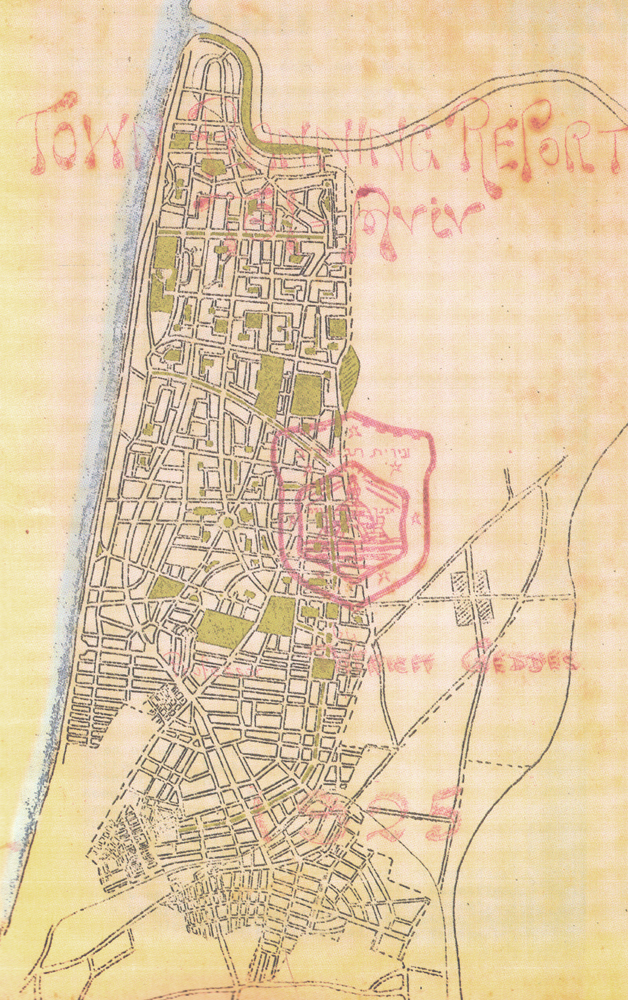
The Urban plan of Tel Aviv, 1925, by Patrick Geddes

Tel Aviv was captured by the British Army on November 17, 1917, and the front line was established to its north. With the beginning of the Mandate, the residents returned to the city, and from 1921 Tel Aviv began to develop rapidly. Ottoman restrictions forbidding economic activity in Tel Aviv were abolished. On May 11, 1921, the Mandatory government published its decision to separate Tel Aviv from Yaffo the "Tel Aviv Municipality Council Ordinance." Two years later, on May 11, 1923, the ordinance was implemented in practice, and most of Yaffo's Jewish neighborhoods received the independent status of a municipal council (Township) the Tel Aviv Community Council and a municipal boundary was set between Tel Aviv and Yaffo.

Since then, the city developed at a rapid pace: from 3,600 residents in 1914, to 34,000 in 1925, and 120,000 in 1936. In the early 1920s, the rapid population growth created temporary housing concentrations where hundreds lived in tents and shacks, in courtyards, on the seashore, and in the Nordia area. The municipality saw this as a health hazard and worked to remove them. Some of the homeless organized into the "Association of the Homeless," founded by Haim Bograshov (Bograshov), to establish the Nordia neighborhood. The Silicate factory, completed after the 1921 riots, supplied bricks for the construction of the Nordia and Tel Nordau neighborhoods.

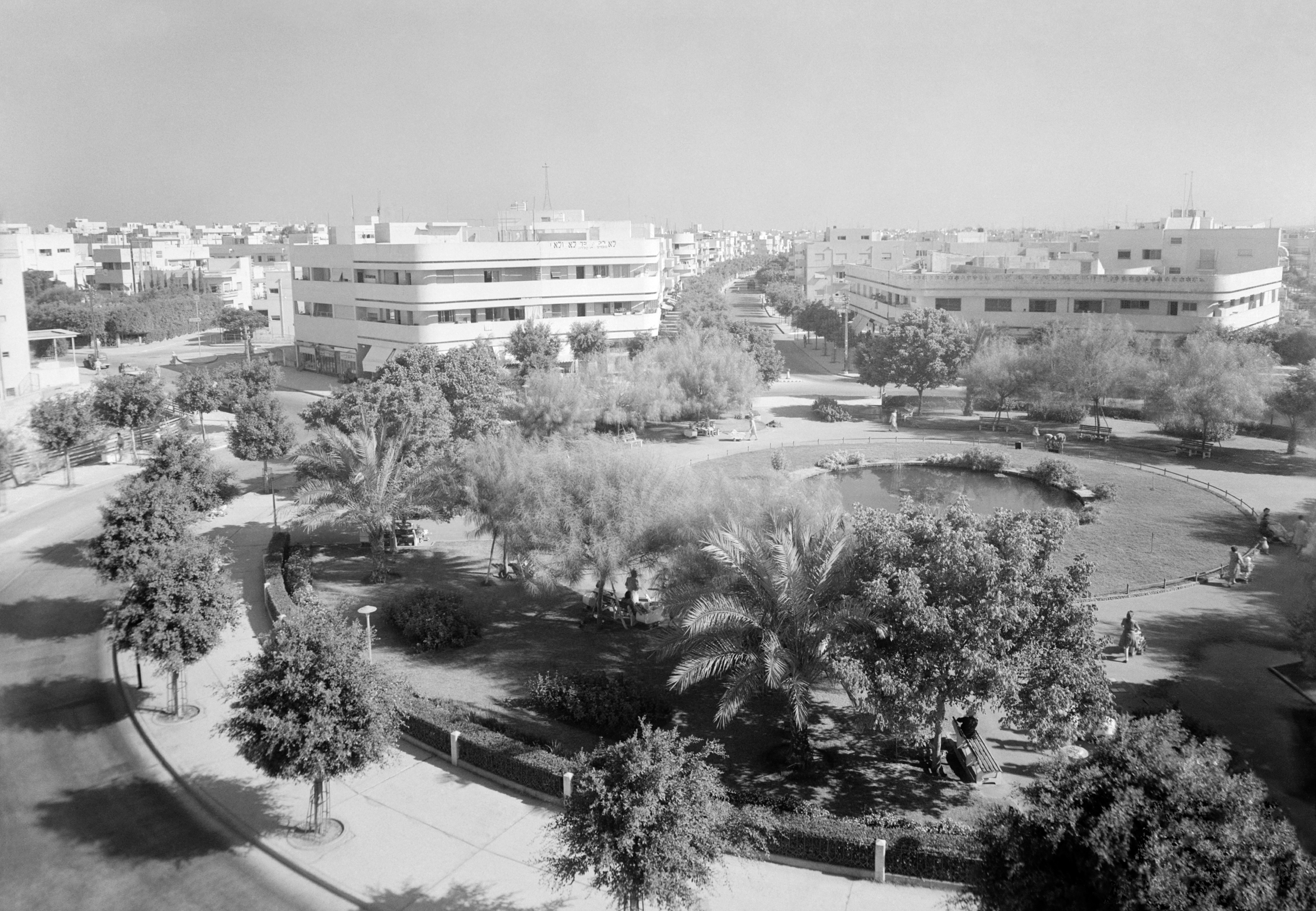
Tzina Dizengoff square, Tel Aviv. An example of modernist architecture.

The main growth of the population was due partly to Jews migrating from Yaffo, but mainly to waves of immigration to the country the Third Aliyah, and especially the Fourth and Fifth Aliyot (1924–1939). These waves were characterized by the arrival of a bourgeois population, families, and people with capital, who preferred urban settlement over agricultural settlement. During this period, Tel Aviv's image as a city with a European character, and less of a Middle Eastern one, took shape. This image strengthened Tel Aviv's attraction for these immigrants. The Bauhaus school of design and architecture, active in Germany from 1919 to 1933, was one of the most important promoters of the new style, and within its framework, a unique sub-style developed. From 1933 to 1936, Tel Aviv experienced a large construction boom in the Bauhaus style with the arrival of the great wave of immigration known as the Fifth Aliyah. In 1925, Patrick Geddes was invited to prepare a master plan for the city's northern expansion, in the spirit of the garden city principles a plan known as the Geddes Plan. This plan was carried out between 1927 and 1929 and was officially approved in 1932.

On January 12, 1934, Tel Aviv was officially declared a city, and its status was changed from a municipal council (Township) to a municipality (Municipal Corporation). By 1936, Tel Aviv had already become the largest city in the country, the center of commerce and agricultural marketing, the hub of crafts and light industry, and the cultural, economic, and public-services center of the Jewish Yishuv. In that decade, the city hosted major events such as the first and second Maccabiah Games and the international Levant Fair. In 1934, on the city's outskirts, the Ahva record company began operating the first record company established in Tel Aviv and in the Yishuv as a whole producing 15 different albums comprising several hundred records.

Tel Aviv Port was established in 1936. Although it was small and not particularly advanced ships could not dock there, and goods and passengers had to be transferred by boat, as in Yaffo it contributed to the city's development. In 1938, north of the port, a municipal airport, Sde Dov, was inaugurated.

With the outbreak of World War II, the city's development halted, and the port of Tel Aviv was requisitioned by the British Army for military purposes only. On September 9, 1940, Italian Air Force planes bombed Tel Aviv, killing 137 people. A year later, the city was bombed again.

== 1950s and 1960s ==
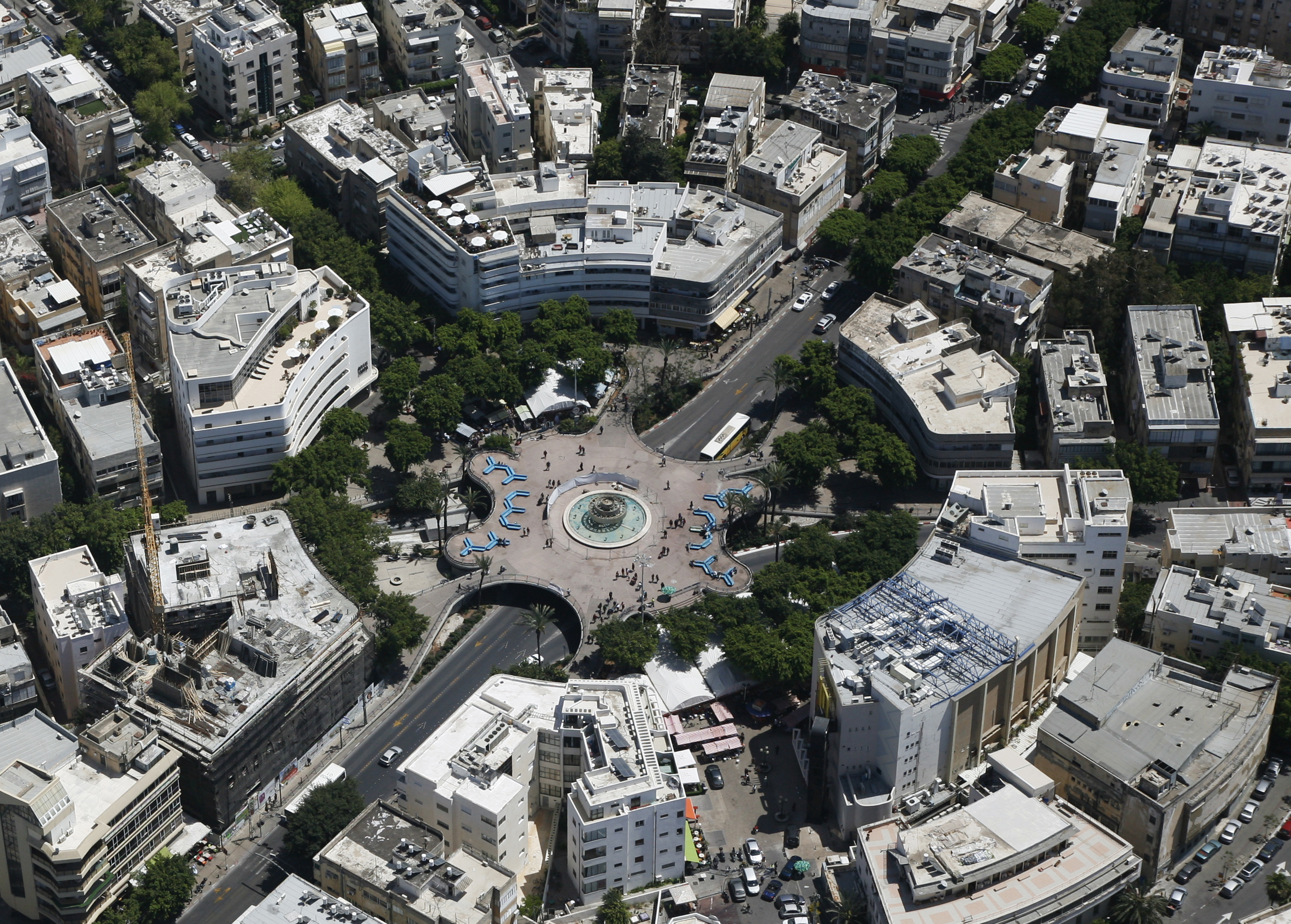
The raised Dizengoff square

Toward the end of the 1950s, a continuous stretch of built-up area emerged between the city and its suburbs (which had also developed significantly during this period), making it difficult to distinguish the city's boundaries. As a result, the term "Gush Dan" began to be used to describe the city together with its surrounding towns and suburbs.

At the beginning of the decade, the army settled in the abandoned Templer colony of Sarona, which had been annexed to the city, and by the mid-decade its northern section was fenced off and turned into a closed military compound, the Kirya base. In the southern part of the colony, most government offices were established.

During this decade, emphasis was placed on improving infrastructure, especially paving roads with asphalt and building neighborhoods in the city's newly developed areas. Conversely, the infrastructure of the older neighborhoods began to deteriorate. In 1958, on Ben Yehuda Street, the first residential building higher than four stories was constructed. In this period, the city absorbed many new immigrants, who were initially directed to Yaffo and to abandoned Arab villages within the city, which turned into slum neighborhoods. To ease absorption, the municipality established welfare projects. In 1953, the Coastal Railway connecting Tel Aviv to Haifa was inaugurated, and the following year, Tel Aviv Central Railway Station was opened, in addition to the southern railway lines departing from the station near Beit Hadar. These two rail systems were only connected along the Ayalon River channel at the end of the 1980s.

This decade also saw the establishment of important cultural institutions such as the Mann Auditorium (Heichal HaTarbut), the Eretz Israel Museum, and the expansion of the Tel Aviv Museum of Art with the construction of the Helena Rubinstein Pavilion, alongside the building of many cinemas. The Adloyada Purim parade was revived in 1955 and continued for more than a decade.

Education also flourished in this decade: the municipal school system was expanded, and the City Council decided to establish a university in the city, despite opposition from the Ministry of Education, which wanted universities built only in peripheral regions. Tel Aviv University was founded in 1956 and subsequently expanded in the 1960s when the Ramat Aviv campus was built.

During this period, Allenby Street began to decline as the central commercial street, while Dizengoff Street reached its peak. The city's beaches and promenade continued their decline, and the public largely stayed away. Due to seawater pollution, the Gordon Pool was built, drawing water from the depths of the sea. Despite the decline of the city's beaches, large hotels were established along the seafront, including the Dan Hotel, the first to rise on the shoreline, followed later by the old Sheraton Hotel and the Hilton Tel Aviv.

Several large parks were also established in this decade, including Independence Park (Gan Ha'atzmaut) and HaTikva Park, and the planting of Yarkon Park began (though initially symbolic, with real development only beginning in the late 1960s). However, plans to surround the city with green belts were canceled. In 1955, the pumping of Yarkon River water began, which effectively turned the river into a sewage channel, causing severe sanitation hazards in the adjacent neighborhoods.

Toward the end of the 1950s, the Herzliya Gymnasium building on Herzl Street was demolished, and the construction of the Shalom Meir Tower began. In 1959, lavish celebrations were held for the city's 50th anniversary. As part of the festivities, the show "Little Tel Aviv" was staged at the Exhibition Grounds (which had replaced the Levant Fair complex), recreating the city's early years and enjoying great success. That same year, municipal elections were held, and for the first time since 1928, the civic bloc (General Zionists) lost control of the city to Mapai.

== 1980s ==
The Yarkon River Authority was established in 1988 in order to clean the polluted Yarkon River.

== Contemporary ==
In 2019, Tel Aviv hosted the Eurovision song contact. Tel Aviv hosts some of Asia's largest Pride Parades; in 2019 the parade had a record of 250,000 participants.

=== Gallery ===
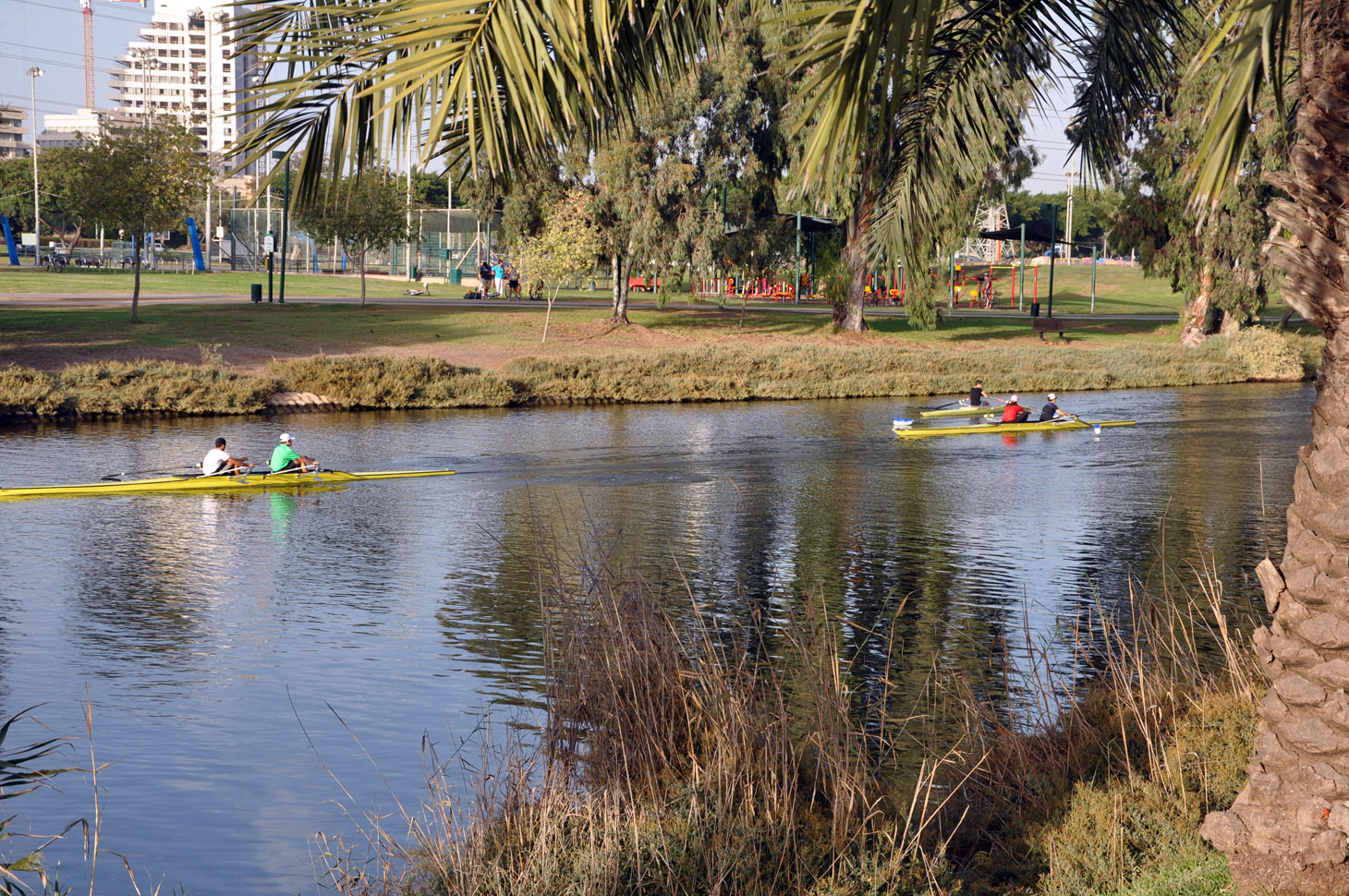
Yarkon Park

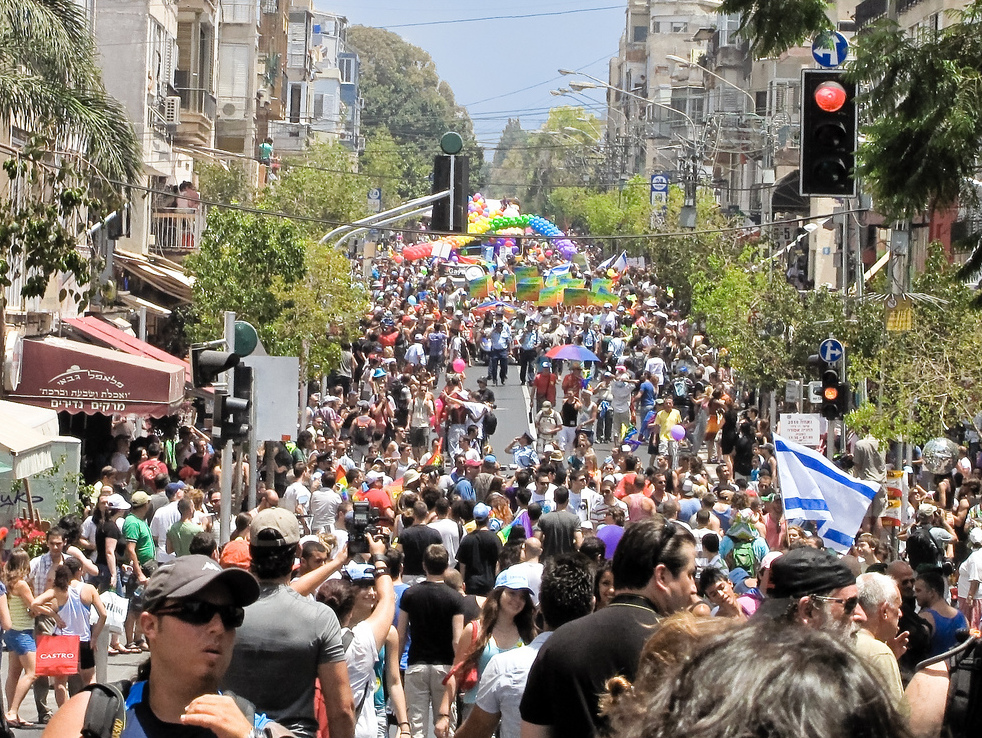
Tel Aviv Pride 2010

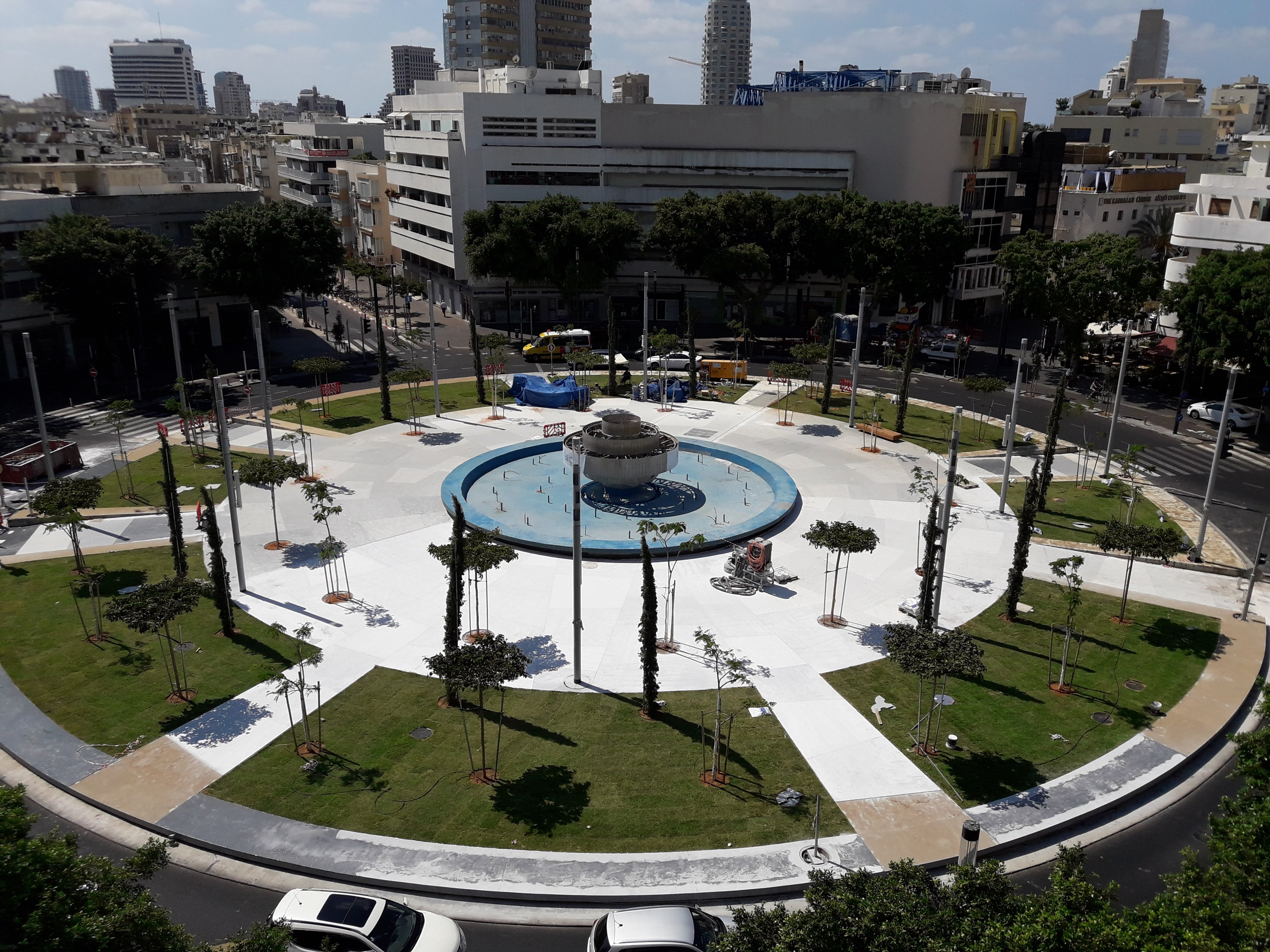
Dizengoff Square lowered back to its former level in the early 21st century.

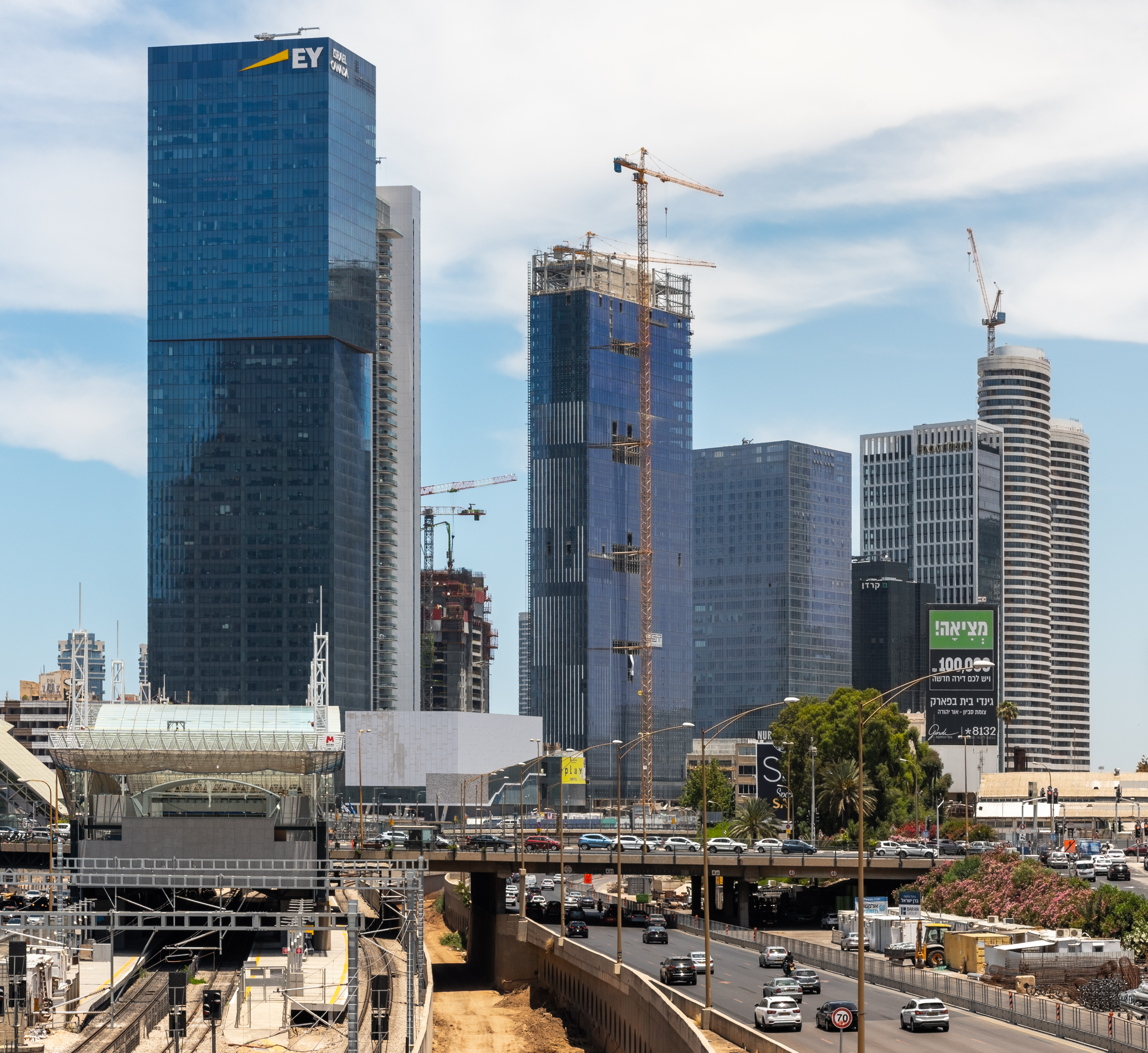
Midtown Business Center in Tel Aviv, Israel, as seen from Yehudit Bridge.

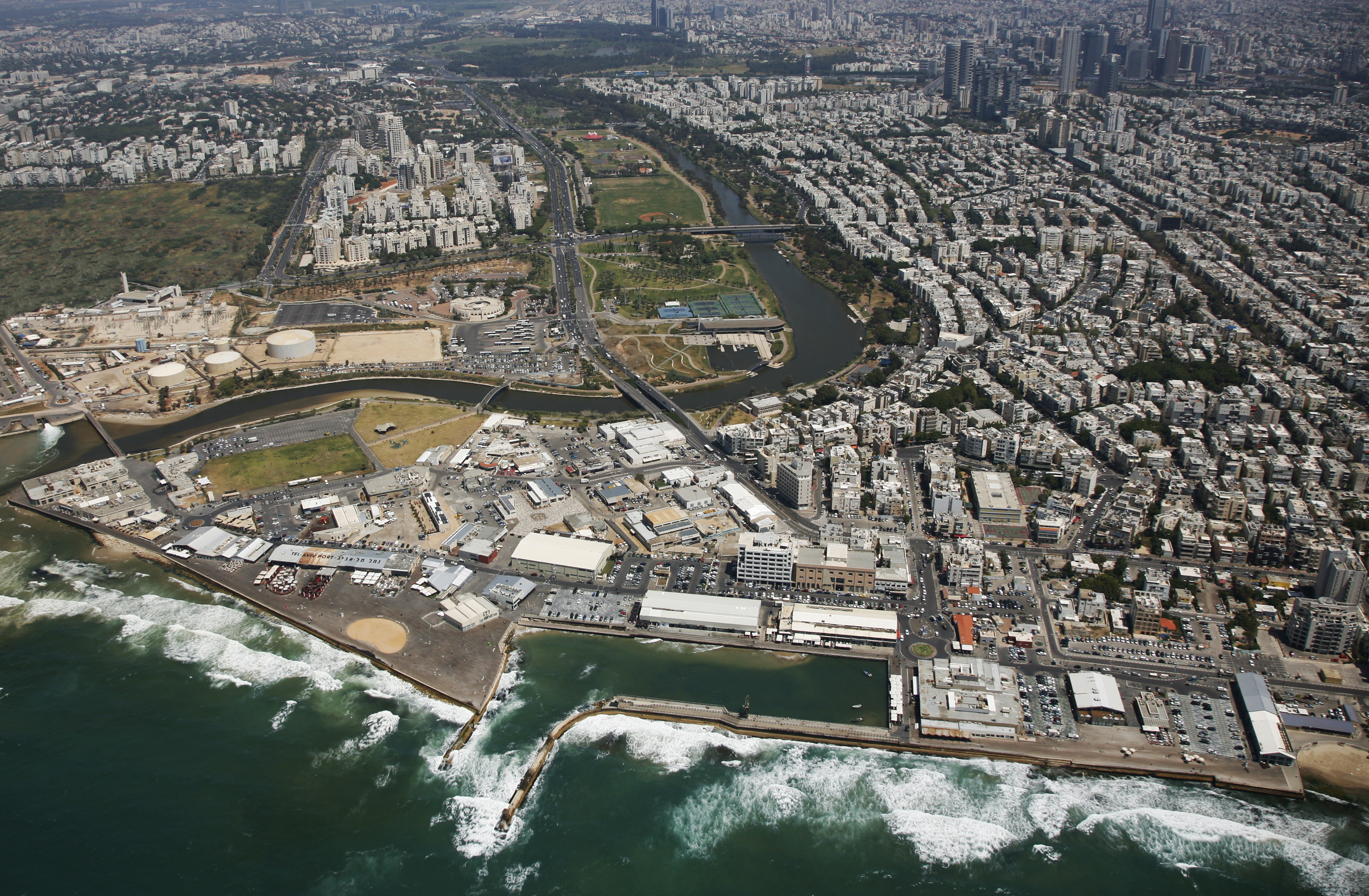
Tel Aviv Port

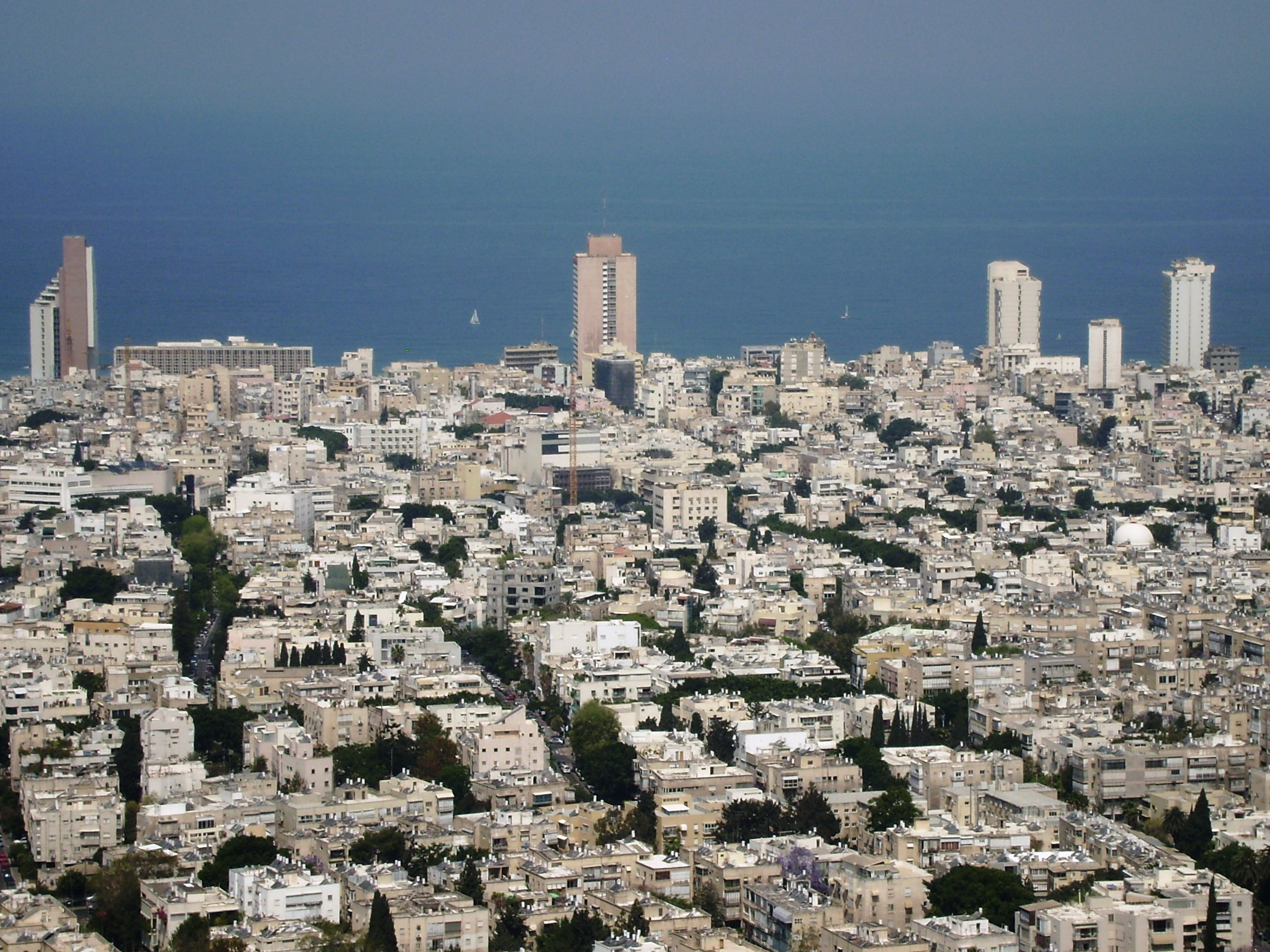
The city of Tel-Aviv, as seen from the rooftop of the highest tower in Tel-Aviv.

== See also ==
- Art in Tel Aviv
- Tel Aviv
- Urban Planning in Israel
