= Art in Tel Aviv =

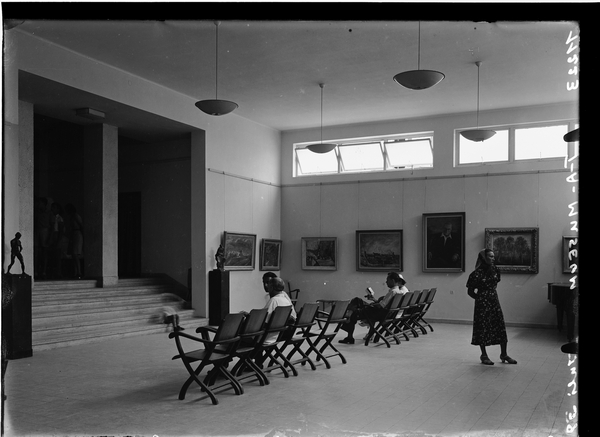
Art exhibit in the Tel Aviv Museum of Art, in its first residence in Meir Dizengoff's home, in 1939

Art in Tel Aviv refers to the history of art in Tel Aviv, Israel, as well as art produced in or depicting Tel Aviv. The first modern artists arrived from Odesa on the Ruslan in 1919, exhibiting the first modern art exhibition in the region in 1920, which was organized by Jacob Pereman. Tel Aviv first gained prominence in the Jewish Yishuv's art scene in 1925 when Yitzhak Frenkel opened the first art school of modern art in Tel Aviv and first brought the influence of the French School of Paris to the region.

In the 1920s, Tel Aviv became a magnet for artists with its art heavily influenced by the French School of Paris. The Histadrut art school pulled students away from Jerusalem's Bezalel. In 1926, in the Ohel theatre exhibition, abstract artwork was exhibited in Mandatory Palestine for the first time. Tel Aviv eventually eclipsed Jerusalem in its cultural role for the Jewish Yishuv.

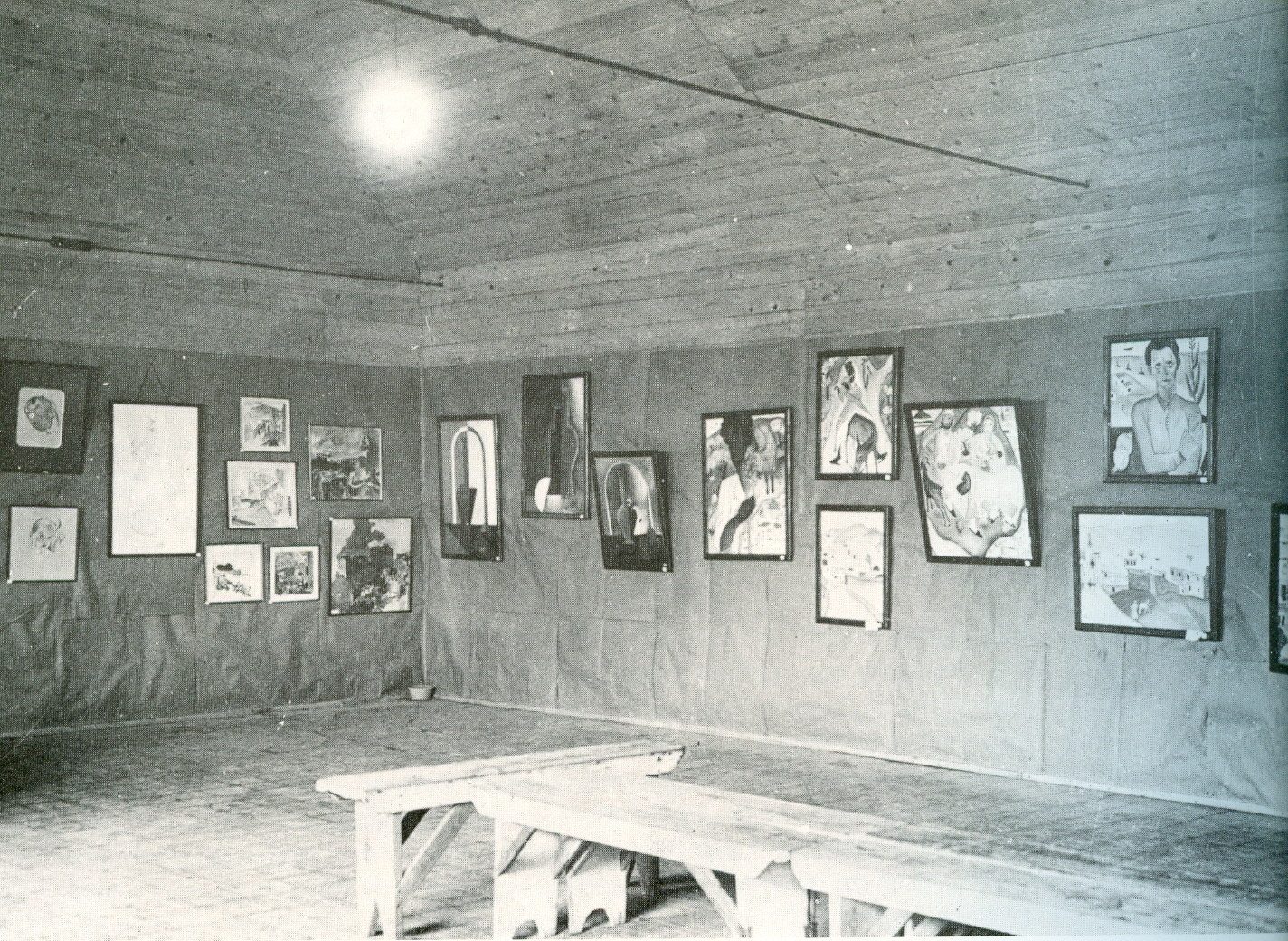
The first modern art exhibition in Tel Aviv, 1926 in the Ohel theatre, organized by the Histadrut Art Studio

From the 1920s to the 1940s, following the influence of French art and particularly of the School of Paris, Tel Aviv was often portrayed in a similar fashion to Paris. The influence of French art on Tel Aviv began to wane following Israeli independence. The Tel Aviv Museum was established in 1933 at Meir Dizengoff's home, later moving to a building near HaBima theatre.

In the late 20th century, Tel Aviv became a hub of graffiti artwork, centered in the formerly working-class neighborhoods of south Tel Aviv, with the Florentin neighborhood becoming a hub of street art.

== History ==
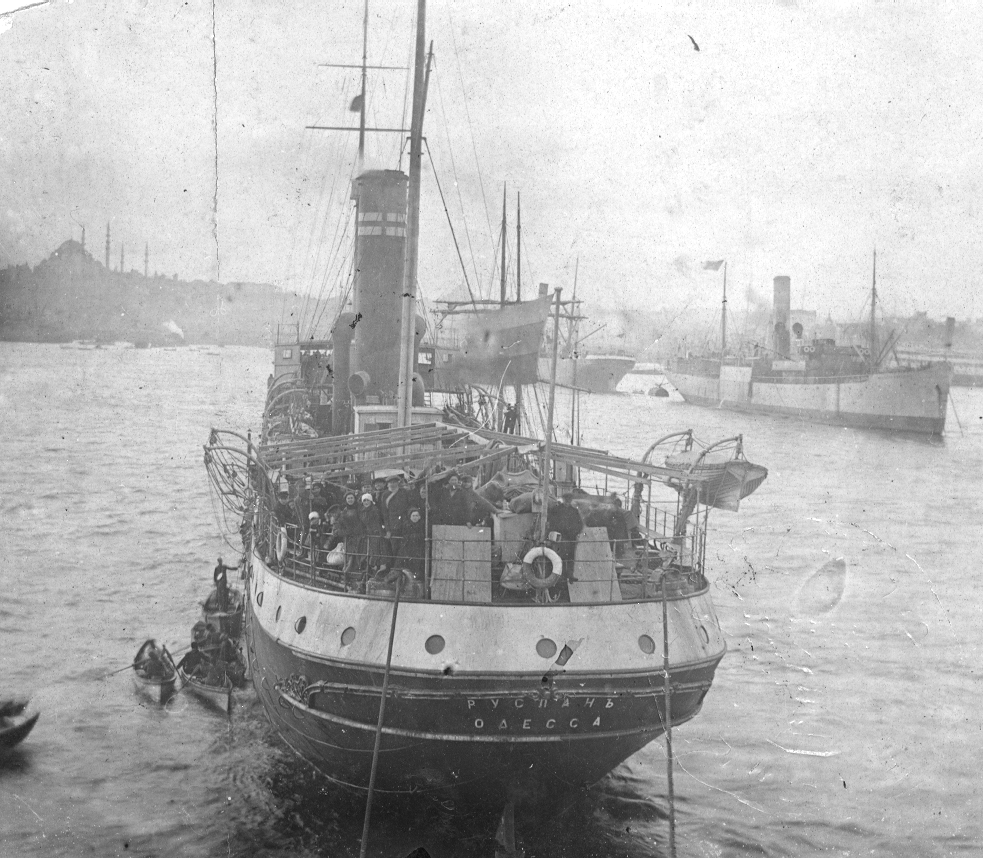
The Ruslan, whilst passing Istanbul

=== The first modern art exhibition in mandatory Palestine ===
In 1919, the Ruslan, a ship carrying Jewish immigrants from Odesa, dubbed the "Israeli mayflower" landed in Jaffa near Tel Aviv. Odesa was at the time the center of Jewish culture in Eastern Europe, numerous artists and intellectuals lived and worked in the city. On board the Ruslan, came several prominent figures in Israel's cultural scene, many of whom would settle or work in Tel Aviv. Jacob Pereman, a historian and art collector, brought with him 200 paintings, mostly Post-impressionist works. He would later exhibit these works in the Hebrew Herzliya Gymnasium in Tel Aviv. Pereman, along with Joseph Constant organized, Ha-Tomer the first Jewish art cooperative whose members were Judith and Joseph Constant, Isaac Frenkel, Miriam Had Gadya and Lev Halperin. 2 of the artists: Constant and Frenkel, taught art in the Hebrew Herzliya Gymnasium.

The Ha-Tomer cooperative organized the first art exhibition in 1920, held in the Herzliya Hebrew Gymnasium. The exhibition, however, lasted only a week due to the 1920 pogrom. The exhibition was a failure, with the mayor of Tel Aviv, Meir Dizengoff, failing to convince even one person to buy an artwork. Later, Pereman opened and maintained the first art gallery in Israel, from 1920–22, "The Permanent Art Exhibition in the Land of Israel". In order to survive, the artists would decorate ceramics and books, as well as the painting and decorating of buildings. In 1920, due to financial difficulties and what the artists felt was a lack of appreciation to modern art, Yitzhak Frenkel, Judith and Joseph Constant left for Egypt and then to Paris. The Ha-Tomer ceased to function following their deperature.

=== Modern art and Tel Aviv ===
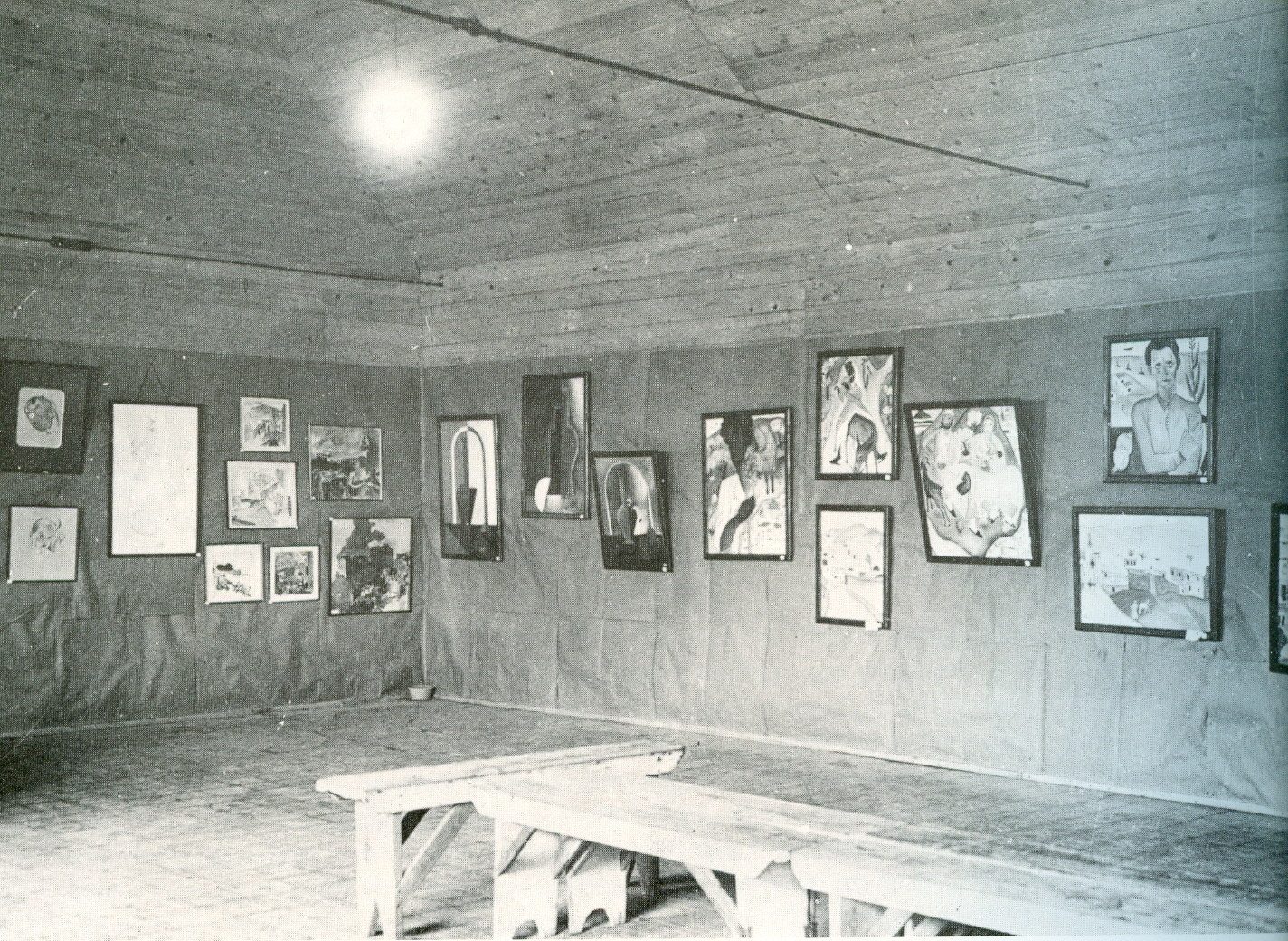
Modern Artists Exhibition at the Ohel Theatre, the Histadrut Art Studio played a major role in the exposition.

When Isaac Frenkel returned from Paris in 1925, he opened an art school with the support of the Histadrut, a Jewish labour union. In the school, Frenkel taught the students the techniques he had acquired in France, as well as acquainted the students with the modern art trends in Paris. Frenkel's school was a modernist alternative to Boris Schatz's Bezalel art academy in Jerusalem which was considered orientalist in its artistic approach. Students from Bezalel would go to Tel Aviv for the weekend to study at the Histadrut studio. Among these Bezalel students were Avigdor Stematsky, Ziona Tagger, Moshe Castel and, Yehezkel Streichman. Frenkel did not request any payment or tuition from his students. According to Amnon Barzel, in September 1927, there were 6 female students out of 17 students in the studio.

The studio participated in several art exhibitions including the "modern artists exhibition" at the Ohel theatre in 1926, in which Frenkel presented his abstract work, the first abstract paintings in the region. According to Gideon Ofrat, the opening of the modern art studio in Tel Aviv rather than in Jerusalem, led to Tel Aviv eclipsing Jerusalem in its importance in the Israeli art scene. The art studio closed in 1929 due to economic challenges.

The artists of Tel Aviv, as well as other Israeli artists in this period, would be under the influence of French art, in particular influenced by the School of Paris of which Frenkel was a part. Frenkel's students would later venture themselves to Paris and upon their return would amplify the influence of modern French art and the School of Paris. Some of these Israeli artists would portray scenes in Israel as though they were painted in Paris or with a Parisian light, which is weaker than the Mediterranean light; some painters switched to a European colour palette. During this period, motifs common in the painters' art where the boulevards and streets of Tel Aviv as well as Tel Aviv's bohemian cafe culture.

=== Meir Dizengoff Prize ===
Since 1934, the municipality of Tel Aviv has granted an annual award to artists. The award is named after the first mayor of Tel Aviv, Meir Dizengoff. Dizengoff had provided a floor in his home to host the Tel Aviv Museum of Art during its first years in the 1930s. The prize was for a time the most prominent art prize in Israel and was meant to help establish Tel Aviv as a center of Israeli art and culture.

=== Post independence ===
In 1936, Aharon Avni, Yehezkel Streichman, and Moshe Sternschuss, who were initially heavily influenced by the School of Paris through their teacher Yitzhak Frenkel, founded what is now called the Avni Institute of Art and Design. It was initially a reincarnation of Frenkel's Histadrut art studio and was at first named the Histadrut's painting and sculpture studio. Artists such as Avigdor Stematsky and Yigal Tumarkin taught in the school. The institute was named after Aharon Avni after he died in 1951.

=== Street art in the late 20th and early 21st centuries ===
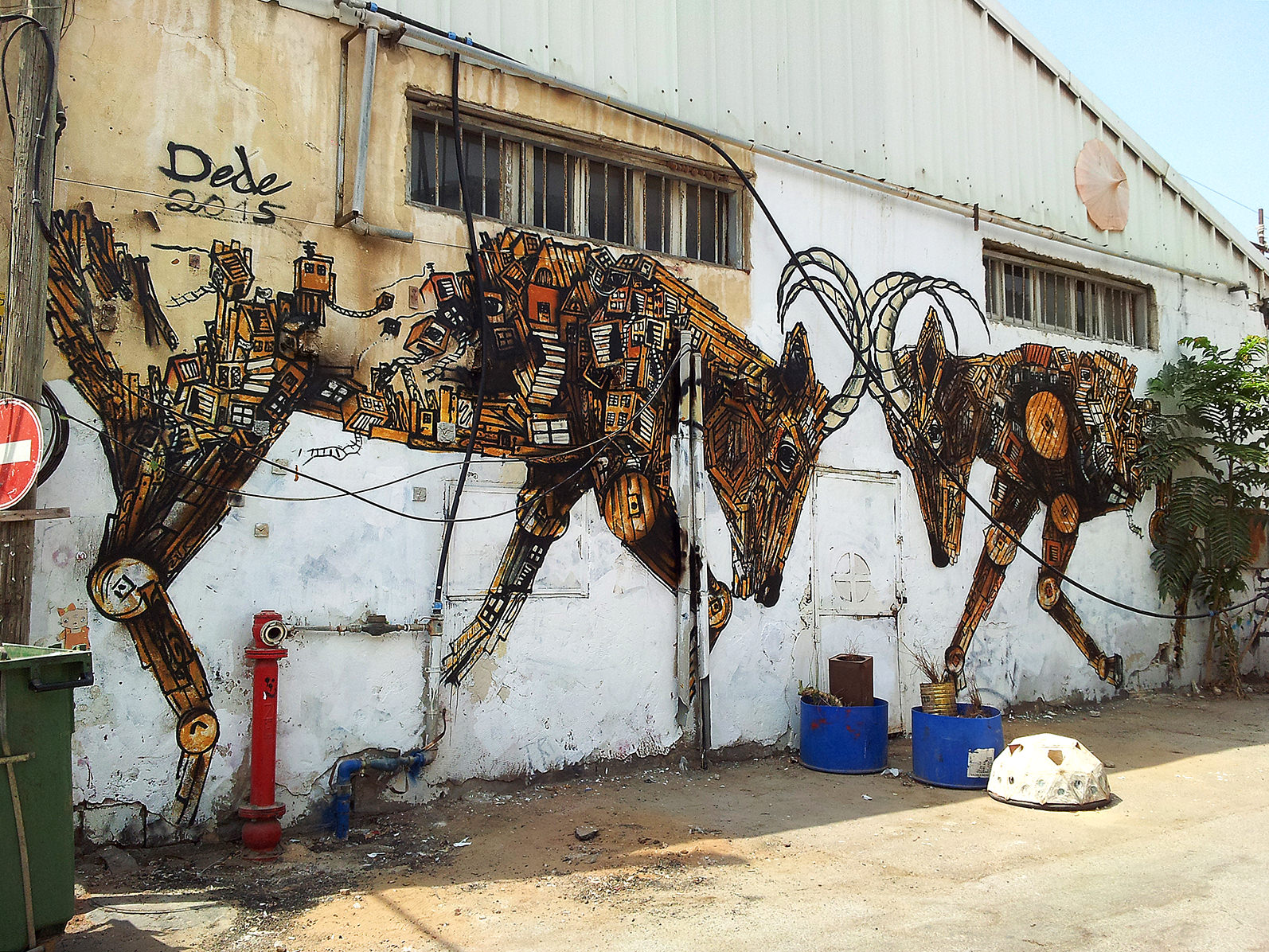
Graffiti art work by Dede

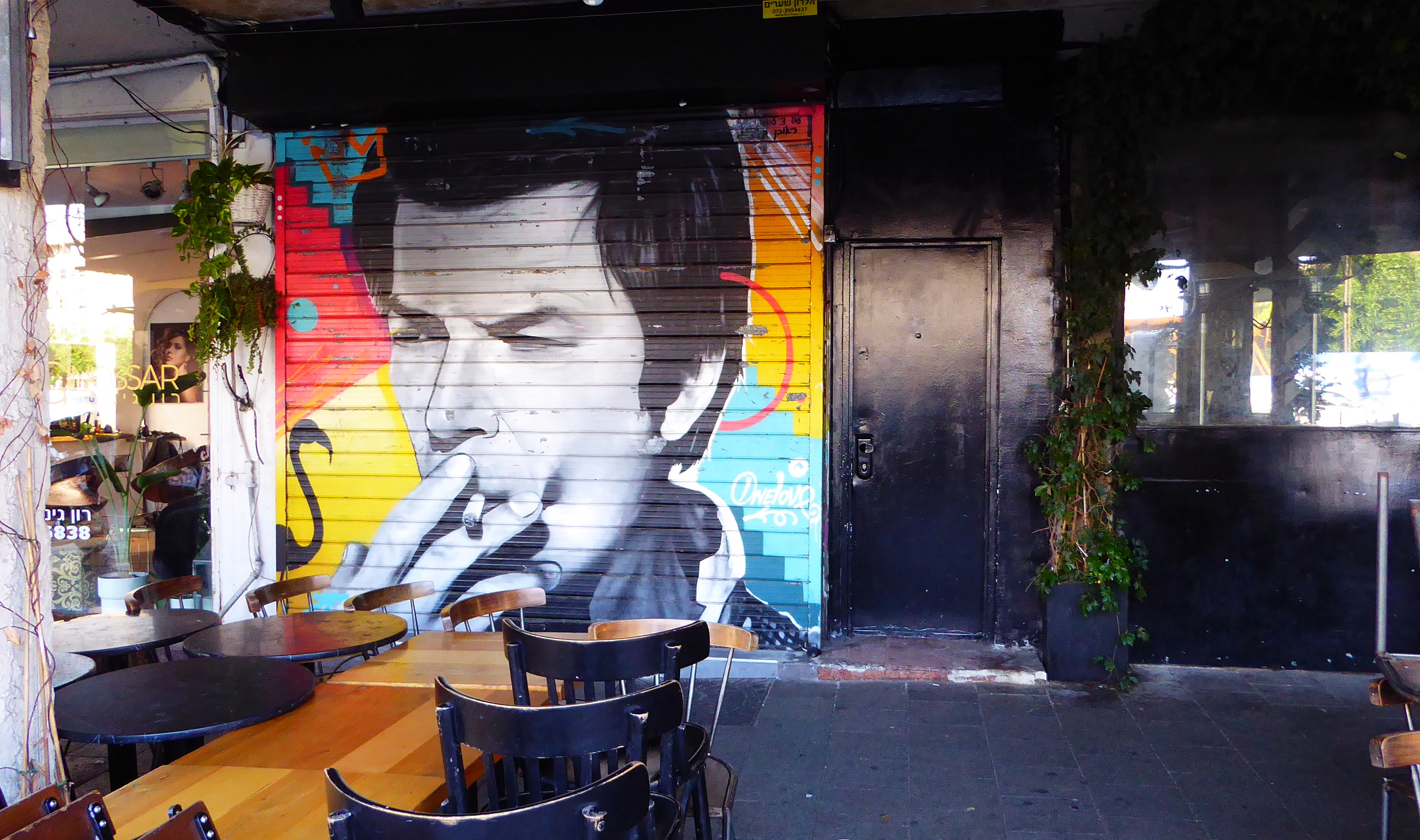
The singer, Arik Einstein street art in a Tel Aviv cafe

Florentin, a once-industrial neighborhood in Tel Aviv, transformed in the 1990s into a hub for a bohemian community drawn to its mix of garages and decaying buildings, which offered ideal canvases for street art. The district's walls were soon covered with murals and graffiti bearing political messages. Alongside vibrant imagery, much of the street art consists of text quotations from Hebrew poetry, religious verses, and layered dialogues between artists. Artists such as Dede, Klone, Kis-Lev, and installation artist Sigalit Landau have established themselves or have works in the area. In a Times of Israel article, the artist, Lord K2 said that following the artistic revival of the area, gentrification has begun and is causing the graffiti art scene to shift elsewhere in the city.

== Museums ==
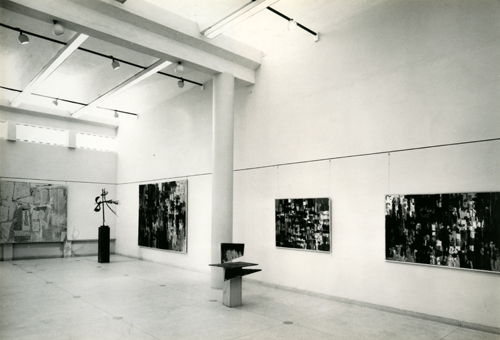
Helena Rubenstein pavilion of the Tel Aviv museum of art, exhibiting Ofaskim Hadashim artwork

=== Tel Aviv Museum of Art ===
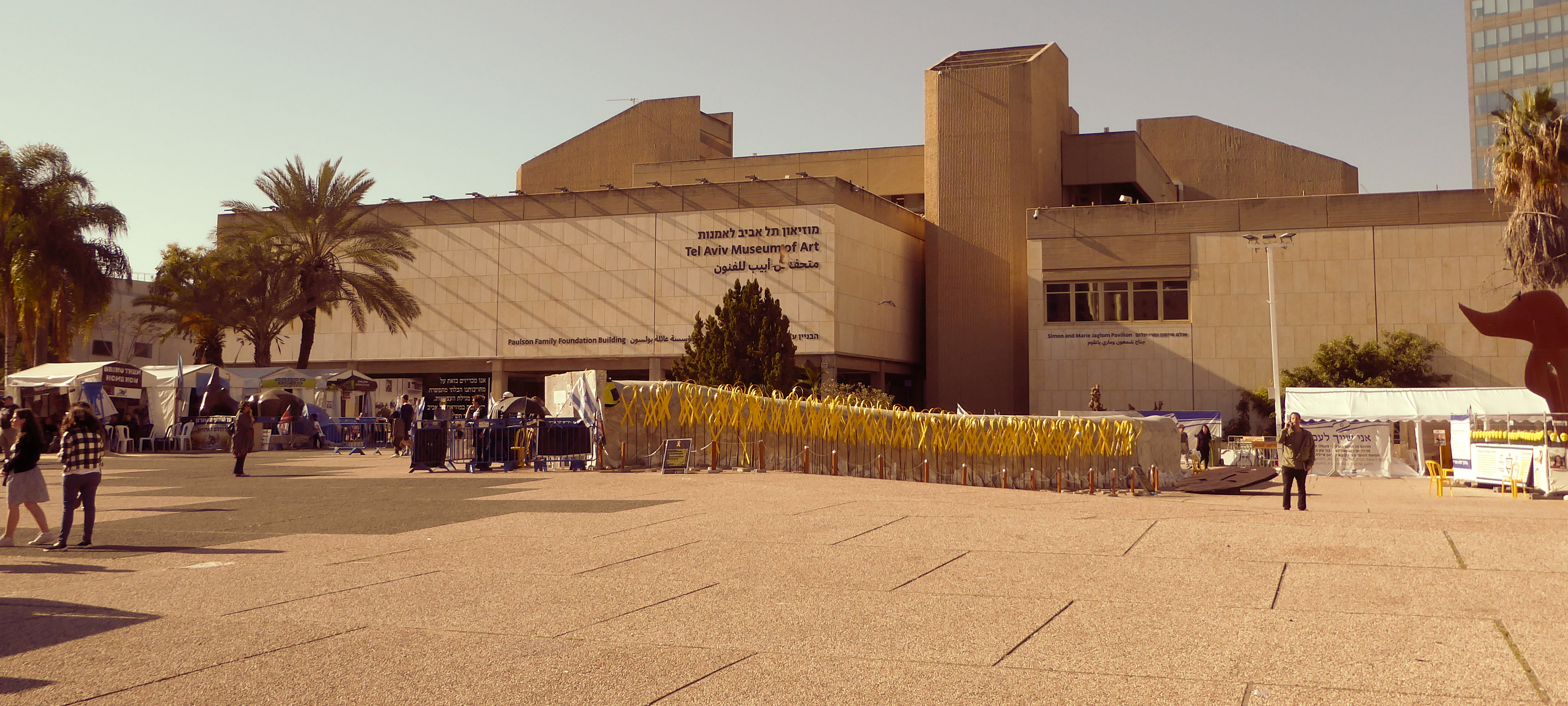
Tel Aviv Museum of Art, 2024

The Tel Aviv Museum of Art was established in 1932 in the former home of Tel Aviv's first mayor Meir Dizengoff, on Rothschild Boulevard. It served as the venue for the Israeli Declaration of Independence signing on May 14, 1948. The museum expanded over the years, beginning with the opening of the Helena Rubinstein Pavilion for Contemporary Art in 1959, near HaBima square. The museum relocated in 1971 to Shaul Hamelech Boulevard. A new wing was added in 1999. Lola Beer Ebner Sculpture Garden and the Joseph and Rebecca Meyerhoff Art Education Center, which was opened in 1988. In 2023, the museum was the 75th most visited museum in the world.

== See also ==
- Visual arts in Israel
- Ha-Tomer
- Histadrut art studio
- Artists' quarter of Safed
- Kenafayim
