= Ha-Tomer =

Artists' cooperative in pre-independence Israel

Ha-Tomer (Hebrew: התומר, lit. 'The Tomer') is an art cooperative that operated in 1920 in Tel Aviv-Yafo. Its members were among the first to support and implement modernist art in Israel. The Tomer also served as the first art gallery in the region.

== History ==
The group was founded as an art cooperative by the collector Jacob Pereman and included the artists Yitzhak Frenkel, the sculptor Liv Halperin, Miriam Had Gadya, Judith and Yosef Konstantinovsky (later Constant). HaTomer was supported by the "Job Ministry of Hapoel Hatzair" in Jaffa. The members of the cooperative had to earn a living by decorating buildings and selling works of art, but due to the small number of orders, they mainly engaged in decorating ceramic vessels, books, posters, pamphlets, fountains and more as well as establishing an art school in Jaffa.

The artists cooperative rented an apartment in the Neve Shalom neighborhood, which turned into a club for artists and art lovers. The apartment's rent was covered by the decorative work carried by the artists. Two of the artists of the cooperative: Frenkel and Constant taught art in the Herzliya Hebrew Gymnasium.

The art corporative organized the "First Art Exhibition" In Eretz Israel, organised by Perman and Constant, presenting some of the artists' works at the Herzliya Hebrew Gymnasium. The exhibition was presented for only a week before being dismantled due to the events surrounding the 1920 pogrom that had just broken out. Even the mayor of Tel Aviv, Meir Dizengoff could not convince anyone to buy an artwork.

Due to financial hardship and the lack of appreciation of their modernist art, in 1920, Joseph and Judith Constant left for Egypt and Isaac Frenkel who joined them, later left for Paris before returning in 1925. Although Jacob Pereman continued to exhibit the works of the cooperative. The cooperative stopped functioning soon after its prominent members had left, thus ended the first modern art group in the Yishuv.

== See also ==
- Histadrut art studio
- Art in Tel Aviv
- Ruslan (Ship)
