= Neve Shaanan Street bombing =

Double suicide bombing by Palestinian bombers, 17 July 2002

Neve Sha'anan Street bombing
- Part of the Second Intifada militancy campaign
- The attack site
- Native name: הפיגוע ברחוב נווה שאנן בתל אביב
- Location: 32°03′34″N 34°46′43″E; Neve Sha'anan, Tel Aviv, Israel
- Date: 17 July 2002; 24 years ago 22:10 pm (UTC+2)
- Attack type: Suicide bombing
- Weapon: Suicide vests totalling ≈ 33 kilograms (73 lb)
- Deaths: 5 (+2 suicide bombers)
- Injuries: ≈ 40
- Perpetrator: Islamic Jihad claimed responsibility

The Neve Sha'anan Street bombing was a double suicide bombing attack which occurred on 17 July 2002 in the Neve Sha'anan street in Tel Aviv, near the Old Tel Aviv Central Bus Station. 5 people were killed in the attack and approximately 40 people were injured. Islamic Jihad claimed responsibility for the attack.

== The attack ==
On Wednesday evening, 17 July 2002, at 22:10 pm, two Palestinian suicide bombers, wearing explosive belts containing about 33 kilograms (73 lb) of explosives, blew themselves up, only 20 meters apart, at the Neve Sha'anan street in Tel Aviv, near the Old Tel Aviv Central Bus Station. The explosives hidden on the bodies of the suicide bombers contained a large quantity of shrapnel and nails, to maximize the amount of injuries. Three people were killed there immediately from the force of the blasts and 40 people were injured. Two additional people died of their injuries a few days later.

== The perpetrator ==
The Palestinian Islamist militant organization Islamic Jihad claimed responsibility for the double attack.

== Official reactions ==
Involved parties

Israel:

- Spokesman for Prime Minister Ariel Sharon, whom spoke about the incident stated that "The Palestinian Authority continues to do nothing to stop the murderous attacks launched from its territory".

Palestinian territories:

- Palestinian National Authority – PNA officials denounced the bombing attack as it "condemns operations targeting civilians, whether they are Palestinians or Israelis."

Supranational

- United Nations – U.N. Secretary-General Kofi Annan condemned the incident and urged both sides not to let the violence derail peace efforts.

International

- USA – White House spokesman Scott McClellan spoke about the incident and stated that "This is a despicable act of terrorism which we strongly condemn."
