= Miriam Had Gadya =

Israeli painter (1895–1982)

Miriam Had Gadya מרים חד גדיא
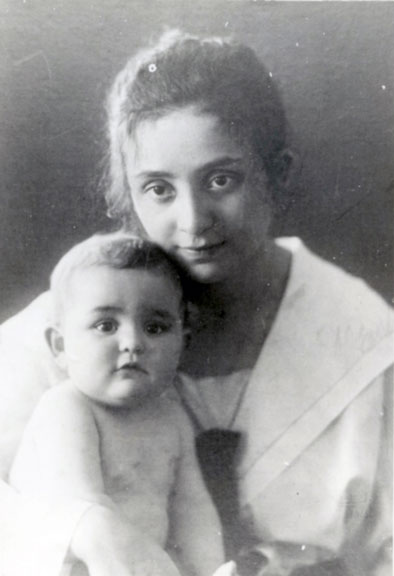
- Born: 1895
- Died: 1982 (aged 86–87); Tel Aviv
- Education: Bezalel in Jerusalem and in Vienna
- Known for: Painting

Miriam Nissimholtz, known as Had Gadya (Hebrew: מרים חד גדיא; 1895 – 1982), an Israeli painter born in Russia, was the first female student in Bezalel School of Art. She was one of the founders of the Tomer.

== Biography ==
=== Early life ===
Nissenholtz was born in Russia and grew up in the village of Kodma near Odessa, to a Zionist pharmacist family. After a short marriage and receiving dowry funds from her parents, she studied pharmacy. Following an exhibition of Bezalel School in 1911 in Odessa, she traveled to the Land of Israel and began studying in Bezalel, she was the first woman to do so.

According to Nissenholtz's testimony, she was the one who coined the nickname "Had Gadya" due to her agility in climbing the hills of Jerusalem similarly to a kid (a baby goat). In 1917, following World War I, she fled to Alexandria because she did not have Ottoman citizenship at the time. In Egypt, she met Raphael Haim Abulafia, a member of the Abulafia family from Rishon LeZion. The couple had two daughters, Shlomit and Ora, and they lived in Tel Aviv. After about 14 years of marriage, the couple separated.

In 1920, she along with Yitzhak Frenkel Frenel, Lev Halperin, Joseph Constant, his wife and Jacob Peereman founded the HaTomer art cooperative.

=== Abroad ===
In 1921, Had Gadya traveled to Vienna, where she studied the art of batik.

Between 1929 and 1932, Had Gadya lived in New York City, where she earned a living from portrait painting. Upon returning to Israel, she settled in Jerusalem and had romantic ties with the poet Alexander Penn. Later on, she married an American merchant named Richard Harris and migrated with him to Cairo. As German Nazi forces advanced towards Egypt during World War II, she fled to New York. During the 1950s, she married an American illustrator.

=== Return to Israel ===
Separating after a few years, she returned to Israel, settling in Ein Kerem and later in the Artists' Quarter in Safed. Her works from the 1970s included abstract compositions characterized by colorful geometric shapes.

She is buried in the cemetery of Kibbutz Mahanayim near Safed.

In 2014, the name of the gallery in the Bezalel neighborhood, which operated in Tel Aviv-Jaffa, was changed to "Gallery Miriam Nissenholtz" in honor of Had Gadya.
