= Neve Sha'anan, Tel Aviv =

Neighborhood in Tel-Aviv

Neve Sha'anan נווה שאנן
- Neighborhood of Tel Aviv
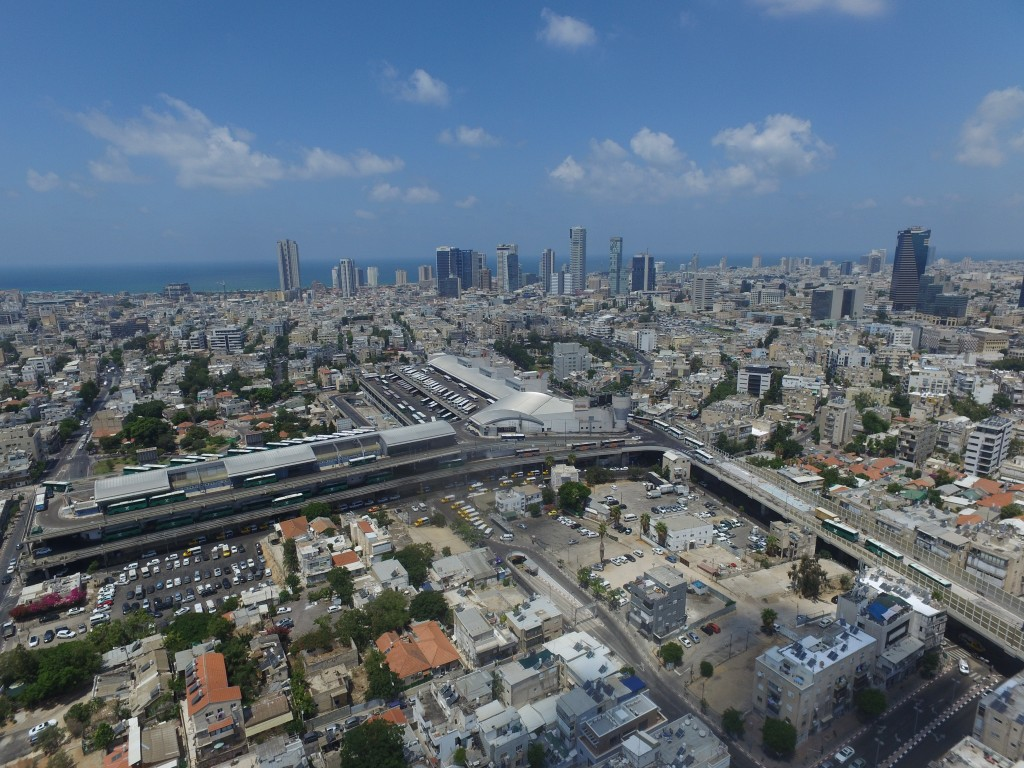
- View of Neve Sha'anan and the central bus station
- Interactive map of Neve Sha'anan
- Coordinates: 32°03′32″N 34°46′51″E
- Country: Israel
- City: Tel Aviv
- Founded: 1921-1923
- Named for: Isaiah 33:20

Area
  - Total: 0.845 km^{2} (0.326 sq mi)

Population (2012)
  - Total: 4,590

Neve Sha'anan (Hebrew: נווה שאנן, eng. "Peaceful Abode") is a neighborhood in Tel Aviv, Israel, founded in 1923. It was founded by Jacob Pereman and Isaac Hiutman.

== History ==
Neve Sha'anan takes its name from a verse in the Book of Isaiah: "Your eyes will see Jerusalem, a peaceful abode" (Isaiah 33:20). The neighborhood was established as a mixed residential and commercial zone north of Jaffa. It was founded by Jacob Pereman and Isaac Hiutman.

Today the main street, Neve Sha'anan Street, is a pedestrian mall. Many foreign workers live in Neve Sha'anan. In 1999, nearly 70 percent of the population was made up of refugees and migrants.

Levinsky Street is named after Elhanan Leib Lewinsky, a member of the Bilu Zionist movement in the Russian Empire, who travelled to Palestine in the early 1880s. In 1896, he was appointed manager of the southern and western Russian branches of the Carmel company, marketing wine produced in Palestine. Levinsky Park has become the social hub of the neighborhood. The Levinsky market, which extends into numerous side streets, is a colorful market brimming with spices, herbs, and teas founded by Jews from Thessalonica, Greece. The Greek Jews were followed by an influx of Iranian Jews and immigrants from other countries where herbal remedies and spicy foods are common.

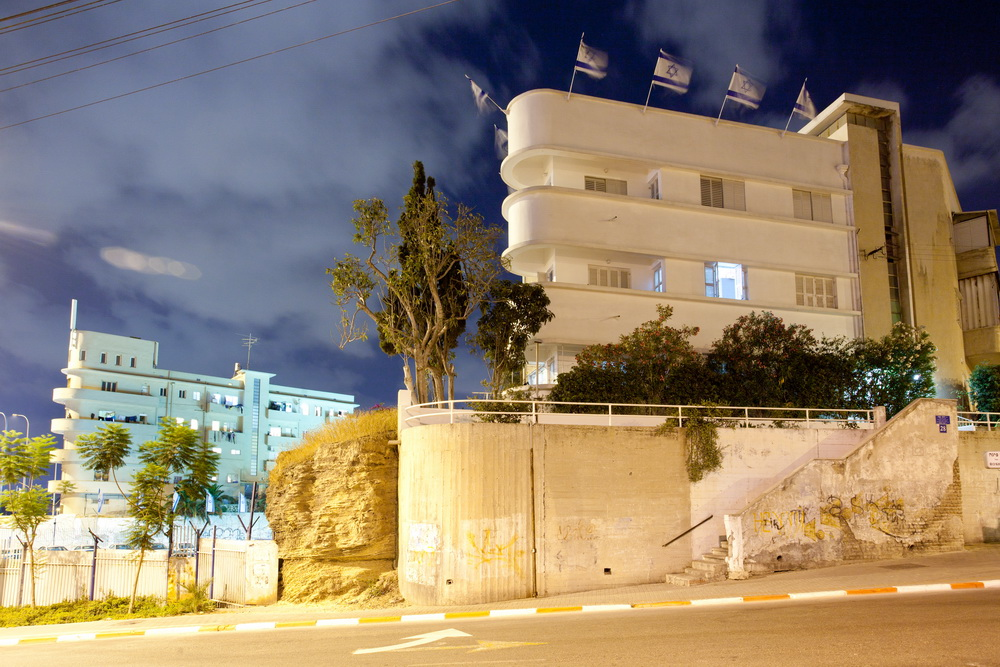
View of the "Ship House" (Shimon Levi House) designed by Arieh Cohen

The neighborhood was the site of a number of terrorist attacks. In July 2002, two Palestinian suicide bombers set off two explosions in rapid succession along a shopping strip in Neve Shaanan. Two of the three victims of the attack were immigrant laborers, who also made up a large portion of the 40 injured. In January 2003, 23 people—15 Israelis and 8 foreign nationals—were killed, and 120 wounded when two Palestinian suicide bombers blew themselves up on the pedestrian mall adjacent to the old central bus station. The mall was packed with shoppers and laborers returning home from work. In April 2006, during the Passover holiday, a Hamas suicide bomber blew himself up at the Rosh Ha'ir shwarma restaurant in Neve Sha'anan, killing 11 people and wounding 50.

== Landmarks ==
=== Bus stations ===
The Tel Aviv Central Bus Station is located in Neve Sha'anan. The original Central Bus Station, in the heart of the neighborhood, was built in the 1940s.

=== Levinsky Garden Library ===
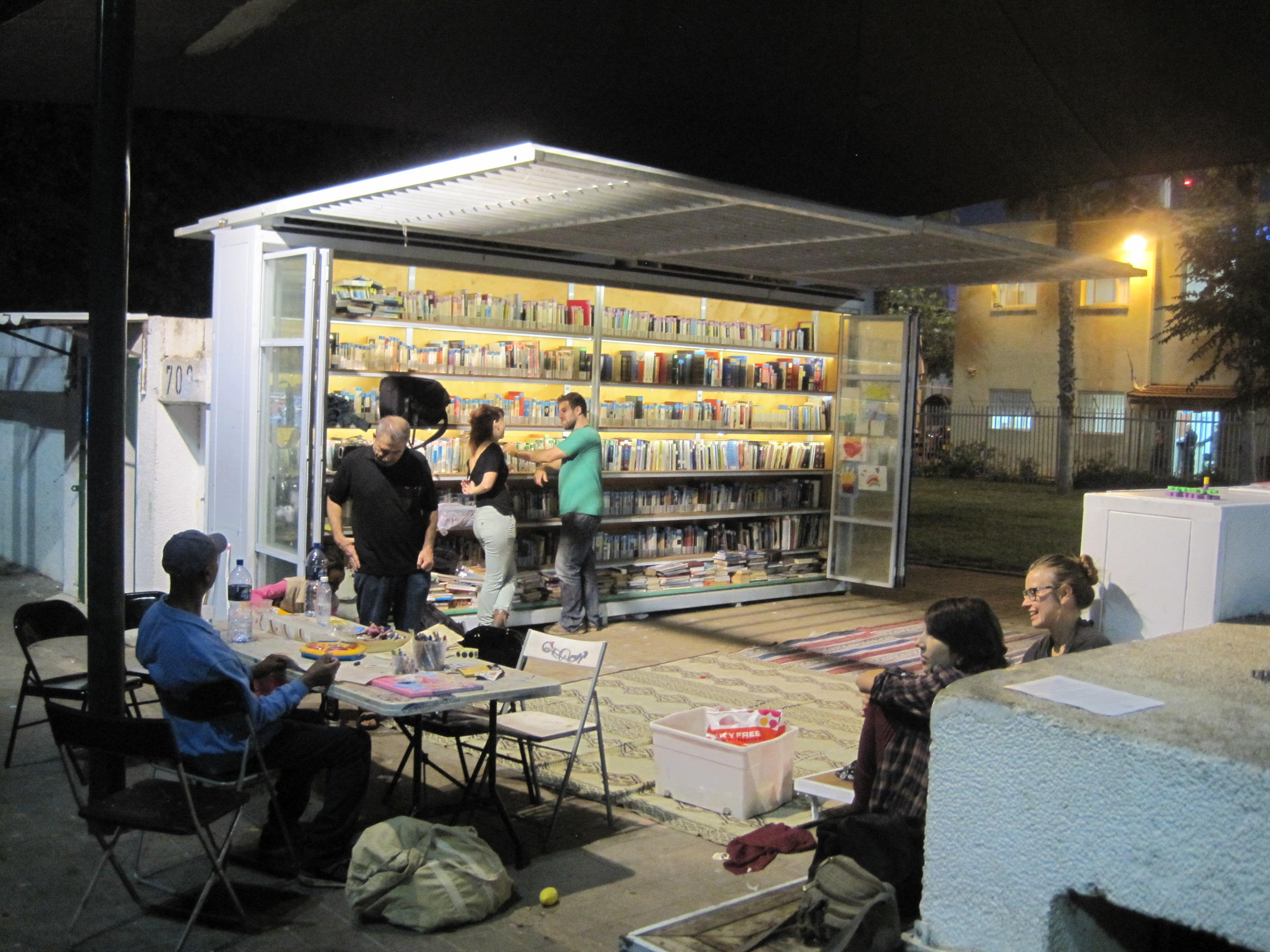
Levinsky garden library

Located in Levinsky Park, the Garden Library consists of two open-air bookshelves (one for adults and one for children). The library services the whole community, but was originally designed with the refugee and migrant population in mind. The library was established in 2009 by the non-governmental organization ARTEAM. In addition to the free books, the library space also offers after school programs for children, art classes and workshops, and language lessons The library offers approximately 3,500 books in 16 different languages. It is located at 98 Lewinsky St. (corner of Lewinsky & Har Zion). The bookshelves are illuminated for easier browsing at night.

== Notable residents ==
- Hanoch Levin (1943–99), dramatist, theater director, author and poet
- Shulamit Aloni

== See also ==
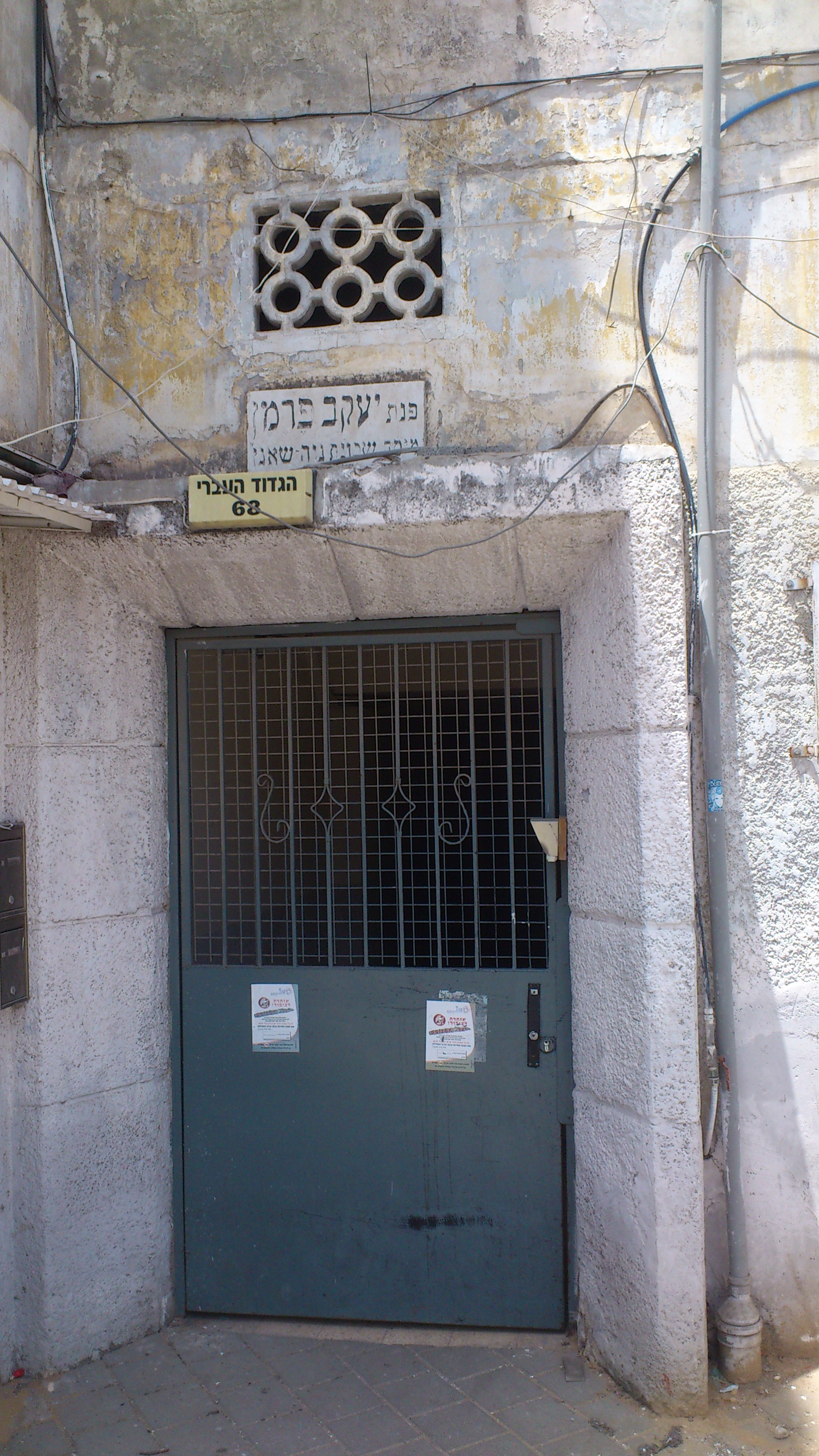
- A placard commemorating Jacob Pereman, founder of the neighborhood.
  Neighborhoods of Tel Aviv
