= Kenafayim =

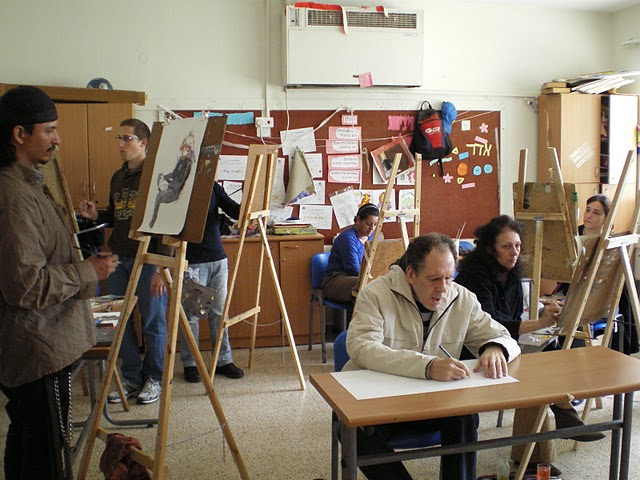
- Kenafayim's artists are engaged in theater, music, writing and visual arts.
- Founded: 2004
- Founder: Dalit Sharon, Rina Padwa
- Type: Non-governmental organization
- Purpose: Arts
- Location: Tel Aviv, Israel
- Method: Artistic and social activity
- Members: 50

Kenafayim (Wings) is an Israeli nonprofit organization founded in 2004 to establish a unique multidisciplinary arts center, the first of its kind in the world. The organization was founded by Dalit Sharon and Rina Padwa, two artists with rich experience in their respective fields, to create a platform for artistic and social activity and provide a unique place for artists with special needs and for artists who are dealing with mental health problems.

The center enables participants to acquire training as artists, musicians and actors, to fulfill their talents and get paid for their art, as a part of their rehabilitation. This concept is based on the belief that the satisfaction from creating, combined with becoming a productive and contributing individual in the community, is leading to a personal and emotional development for each participant, enriches life skills and self esteem. Theater shows, exhibitions and music concerts by Kenafayim’s artists expose the wide audience to their unique worlds, and allow cultural interaction and mutual involvement.

Two groups of artists operate in Kenafayim: a group of artists struggling with mental illnesses and a group of artists with intellectual disabilities. The artistic activity in Kenafayim focuses on theater, music, visual art, cinema and writing, and it takes place every day in the morning.

== History ==
- In 2004 Kenafayim organization was established.
- In 2008 Kenafayim established the Kenafyim Lobby Gallery at Shapira Community Center in Tel Aviv .
- In 2009 (and the year after that) Kenafayim represented Israel at the International Theatre Festival "No Limits" in Berlin with the play "Silver Spoon".
- In 2010 the city of Tel Aviv granted Kenafayim a house in order to build the “Kenafayim Center" – a complex of art studios combined with theater hall, gallery and a bar, a house in which the artists of Kenafayim would create and from where they would distribute the products of their art to the public.
- In 2011 Kenafyim represented Israel with the play "Silver spoon" at the international “Creahm” festival in Belgium. Kenafayim's artists represented artists with disabilities at The Museum of Everything in London.
- In 2012 Kenafayim represented Israel with the play "Silver spoon" at the international festival "Nit Ariadni" in Russia, while their artists exhibited their works in Pushkin Museum. Kenafayim's representatives have met with the leading psychiatrists, decision makers (including president Vladimir Putin adviser on matters of disabilities) and the media in Russia to advise them on the issue of art's role in rehabilitation and explain the infrastructure needed for establishing enterprises such as Kenafayim's art centers in Russia. In the same year Kenafayim made history by becoming the first organisation in the Middle East to have their play "Silver Spoon" played by actors with mental retardation included in the nationwide culture program for high schools. At that year, in Israel, Tel Aviv, the first single from the disc of Kenafayim Project "Stepping into life" came out. The single was launched in a fundraising gala evening with Berry Sakharof. In the same year joined the organization Yossi Aud as a CEO. Yossi Aud is a social - educational entrepreneur, who co-founded and managed educational and social change organizations around the country.

== Activity ==
Participants who are dealing with mental health crises study and engage in music, theater, cinema and visual arts activities. About fifty people are participating every day, where they get to learn and create in a supportive environment. Their creations are exhibited in private and public galleries and exhibitions throughout Israel and abroad, and their plays and concerts are played around the world.

Kenafayim operates to enable the rehabilitation of artists who are dealing with mental health crises by working professionally in the area of their own artistic talent. The activity in Kenafayim improves the confidence and the status of its participants in society, thus helping them to become more independent and active citizens and a productive part of the society. Once in a week a "meeting with an artist" workshop is being held, bringing famous artists and musicians to present their work to Kenafayim’s participants.

Kenafyim operates two programs into two different groups:

- The first group consists of artists (musicians, painters, singers, sculptors and actors) who are dealing with mental health crises such as schizophrenia, clinical depression and obsessive - compulsive disorder. The work in Kenafayim allows them to fulfill their talents, empowers them and enables to develop the artistic and social skills they lost, to get inspired and to gradually recover. Performances and exhibitions of Kenafayim's artists are regularly presented in Israel and abroad and get paid for their art products and for performers.
- The second group consists of actors with intellectual disability of varying degrees. The group performs regularly in the best theater halls in Israel and at festivals abroad.
