= Siona Tagger =

Israeli painter (1900–1988)

- ציונה תג'ר
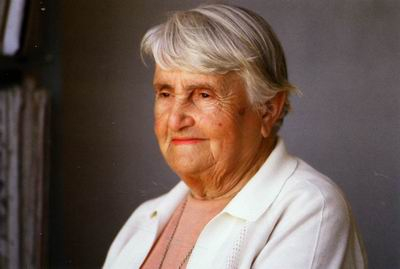
- Born: August 17, 1900; Jaffa, Israel
- Died: June 16, 1988 (aged 87); Tel Aviv, Israel
- Citizenship: Israeli
- Education: Yitzhak Frenkel and Joseph Constant's studio; Bezalel Academy of Arts and Design
- Occupation: Artist

Siona Tagger (also spelled Sionah Tagger, Hebrew: ציונה תג'ר; August 17, 1900–June 16, 1988) was an Israeli painter, known for her paintings of the life in early 20th century Land of Israel and the Yishuv.

The student of Isaac Frenkel and Joseph Constant; in 1925, she became the first female member of the Hebrew Artists Association, and is often considered "the most important female Israeli artist of the early decades of the 20th century."

== Life ==
=== Early life ===
Siona Tagger was born in Jaffa to Shmuel and Sultana Tagger. Tagger's family originated from Sepheradi Jews from Spain which moved to the Netherlands in the 15th century and later to Germany and Bulgaria. Sionna's parents were among the first residents of Ahuzat Beit neighborhood near Jaffa which in time would grow to become Tel Aviv. The family later moved to Rothschild boulevard where they lived in the first multi-story building in the city.

She attended the Yehili school for girls and from there continued her studies in Levinski seminary.

=== Artistic education ===
She first studied art in Isaac Frenkel's art studio in Gymnasia Herzliya in Tel Aviv. There she studied under Yitzhak Frenkel and Joseph Constantinovsky, in the studio she absorbed the influence of Russian Cubo-Futurism from her teachers who had come from Odessa on board the Ruslan.

When the studio closed its doors after a year, Tagger insisted on continuing her art studies at the Bezalel Academy of Arts and Design in Jerusalem, despite facing opposition from her parents. Eventually, they relented under the condition that she would reside in her grandfather's home in Jerusalem. Tagger pursued her studies at Bezalel from 1921 to 1922, and upon completion, she made the decision to travel to Paris, despite renewed objections from her parents. Determined to follow her own path, Tagger dedicated a year to saving the necessary funds, challenging her parents' disapproval. Reflecting on her choices later, she acknowledged that everything she undertook went against the norms of a respected Sephardi family.

Afterwards she moved to Paris to continue her art studies.

=== 1930s and 1940s ===
Art consistently remained Tagger's foremost priority, even after her marriage to Michel-Mordechai Katz in 1933, the birth of her son Avraham Katz-Oz in 1934 (who would later become a Knesset member and Israel's Minister of Agriculture), and subsequent divorce. She cited her separation from her husband, explaining that he couldn't accept the extensive hours she dedicated to her art, often neglecting meal preparation. According to her son, she never took to cooking, fully absorbed as she was in her painting and Tel Aviv's bohemian society. The couple parted ways in 1940, with Michel remarrying. Siona was a single mother facing economic challenges. She committing herself to painting for her livelihood.

During World War II, she volunteered for the British Army and served as a driver in the Auxiliary Territorial Service. She was discharged in 1944 and returned to Tel Aviv. She later joined the Haganah.

=== Later career ===
Tagger's paintings of the people and landscapes of Eretz Yisrael in watercolors and oil were displayed in several museums and galleries. In the 1960s, she added a collection of stained glass of biblical themes.

In 1977, Tagger was named Yakir of the City of Tel Aviv-Yafo for her lifelong contribution to the arts in the city, and a street was named after her.

== Artistic style ==
During the 1920s, Tagger, along with other "modernist" artists, mostly of the Histadrut art Studio and former pupils of Isaac Frenkel and Joseph Constant, predominantly based in Tel Aviv, diverged from the Romantic Orientalist tradition prevalent in Bezalel's landscapes and figure paintings. Instead, Tagger and her contemporaries became increasingly fascinated with the contemporary surroundings and cultural figures. The portrayal of rustic Arabs or Yemenites representing the ancient Jewish inhabitants of the land gave way to depictions of pioneers, writers, poets, and present-day public figures. This shift is evident in Tagger's painting featuring the poet Avraham Shlonsky (1900–1973). She shifted from painting Jerusalem to painting the countryside of the land of Israel as well as Safed, Jaffa and Tel Aviv.

Although Tagger distanced herself from the orientalism of Bezalel, she frequently created portraits of Sephardi women. Instead of conveying a romantic or exotic sentimentality, Tagger depicted the environment and family in which she had personally grown up. The Sephardi women featured in numerous paintings are, in fact, members of her own family—such as her mother, sisters, and friends. An illustration of this is found in her portrait of a girl in purple, specifically her sister Shoshana.

== See also ==
- Visual arts in Israel
- Ziona Tagger's wok "Celebration at Jaffa" sold for $43,700 at Tiroche auction house, January 30, 2010
