= Jacob Pereman =

Writer, Art Patron and Scholar; a Jewish Zionist Activist

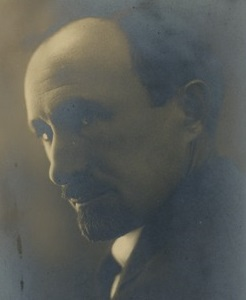
- Native name: יעקב פרמן
- Born: 4 August 1881
- Died: 19 September 1960 (aged 79)
- Occupation: Author, Art Collector, Zionist Activist, Biblical Scholar, Biographer
- Partner: Sarah Streicher
- Children: 4

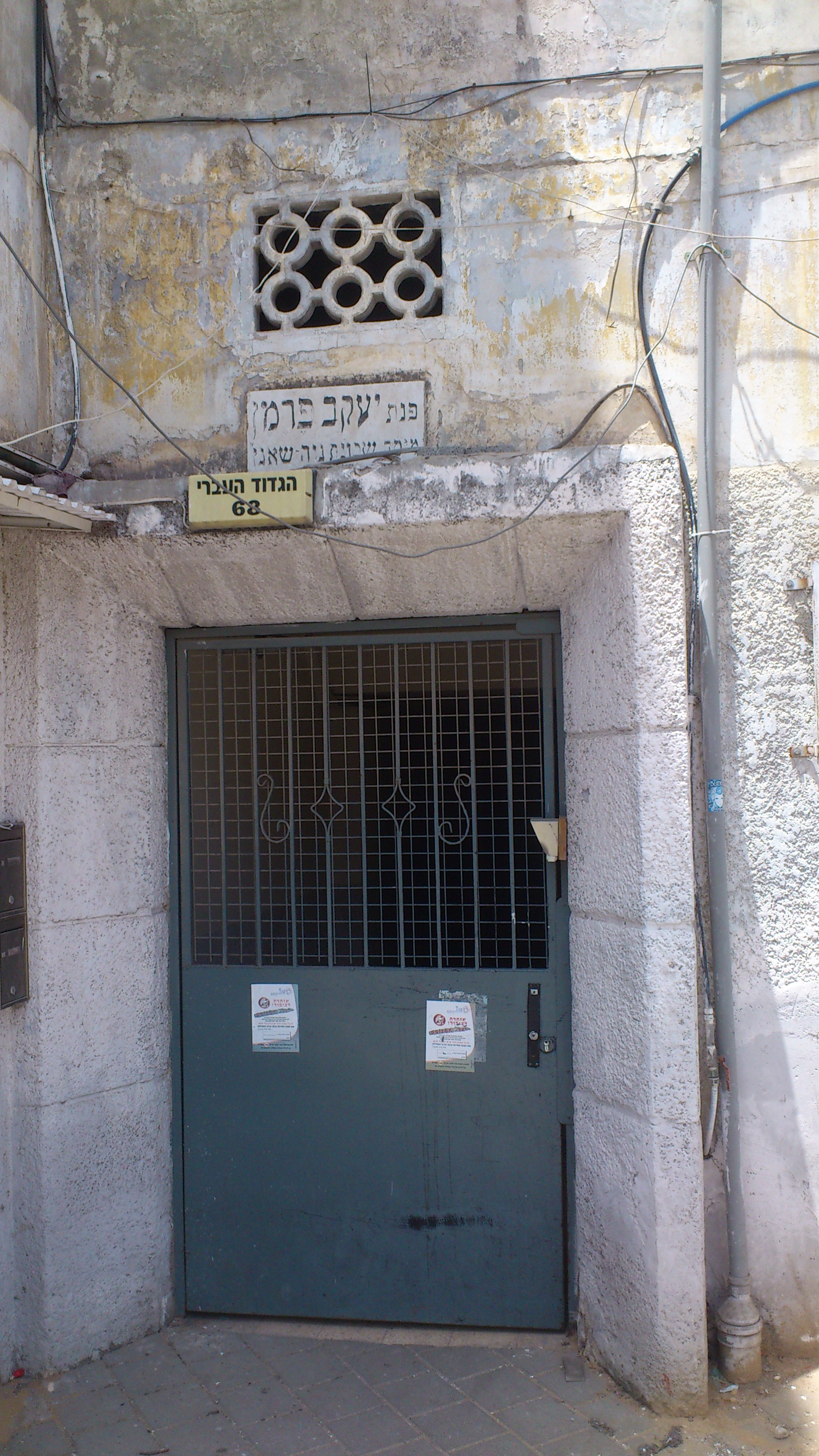
Jacob Pereman Corner in Neve Sha'anan neighborhood, Tel Aviv

Jacob Pereman (Hebrew: יעקב פרמן; August 4, 1881 – September 19, 1960) was a Zionist activist, poet, thinker, biblical scholar, bibliographer, an art and book collector, expert and pioneer in the research of Jewish art and in its introduction to the general public in the Land of Israel.

== Life and work ==
=== Life and work in Ukraine ===
Jacob Perman was born into a family of rabbis in the town of Zhytomyr in Vohlin, Southwestern Russia (Ukraine). As a child, his family moved to Odessa. He studied at Yeshiva Volhynia and in 1897 was ordained to the rabbinate. After that he acquired a general education and became a Zionist activist and public figure. Among other things, he was one of the leaders of the "Poalei Zion" party and secretary of the "Zion Lapinsker" association. At the beginning of the 20th century, he organized a proclamation by intellectuals that included: Hayim Nahman Bialik, Jacob Fichman, Shlomo Zemach and the publicist Nat Inver, for the establishment of "The Erez Israeli league for flowering Art";

=== Aliya ===
In the beginning of the third aliyah period, he was one of the organizers of the aliyah on the well-known ship "Ruslan" from the port of Odessa, and he himself boarded the ship and arrived at the port of Jaffa on December 19, 1919. Before his arrival in Israel, Perman collected about 200 works of art, mostly Post Impressionist works, and mostly painted by Jewish Ukrainians and Russians including 25 modernists, as well as many books; and after his arrival he organized a large exhibition of the works he brought with him at the Herzliya Hebrew Gymnasium in Tel Aviv. His house became a cultural center due to its spectacular collections. The large collection of books was donated years later to the foundation of the library at Tel Aviv University.

=== HaTomer Art Cooperative ===
After his arrival he established and organised along with the artists: Isaac Frenkel, Joseph Constant, his wife Judith Constant, Miriam Had Gadiah and Lev Halperin the Ha-Tomer art cooperative.

The Tomer was founded to revive Hebrew art in the Land of Israel. In the years 1921-1922 he established and managed the first gallery in Tel Aviv called: "The Permanent Art Exhibition in the Land of Israel". Works by artists from the Bezalel school were displayed and put up for sale in the gallery. Artworks by non Bezalel artists such as those who originally formed the cooperative like Isaac Frenkel and Joseph Constant also were in the permanent exhibition. Perman assisted several artists, including the well-known artist Abel Pann present his Biblical themed works.

=== Later Work ===
In the 1920s he founded along with Isaac Hiutman the Neve Sha'anan neighborhood in Tel Aviv.

=== Personal life ===
In 1905 he married Sarah Streicher, he was the father of four: Nachman Pereman, a civil engineer and surveyor; Natan Pereman, an agronomist, surveyor and real estate appraiser; Chava Chernov, a school inspector for the Ministry of Education, author of spelling textbooks; and Atida Machlis.

Sarah, his wife died in 1945, aged 65 and was buried in the Mount of Olives cemetery, Jerusalem.

Jacob Perman died in 1960, following a difficult disease, aged 80. He was buried in the Kiryat Shaul Cemetery.
