= Joseph Constant =

French sculptor

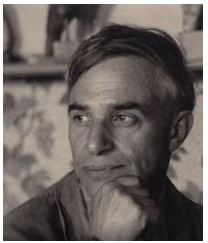
- The artist, also known by his pen name "Michel Matveev"
- Born: Joseph Konstantinovsky; 14 July 1892; Jaffa
- Died: 3 October 1969 (aged 77); Paris
- Resting place: Cimetière parisien de Bagneux
- Education: Academy of Fine Arts Odessa
- Known for: Sculptor, Writing, Painting
- Style: Constructivist, Impressionist, Realism
- Movement: Animalists, École de Paris
- Spouse: Judith Constant
- Awards: Prix des Deux Magots

Joseph Constant (born Joseph Constantinovsky, 14 July 1892 – 3 October 1969) was a Franco-Russian Israeli sculptor, painter and writer of Jewish origin. As a sculptor, he adopted the name "Joseph Constant", as a writer he used the pseudonym "Michel Matveev".

== Early life ==
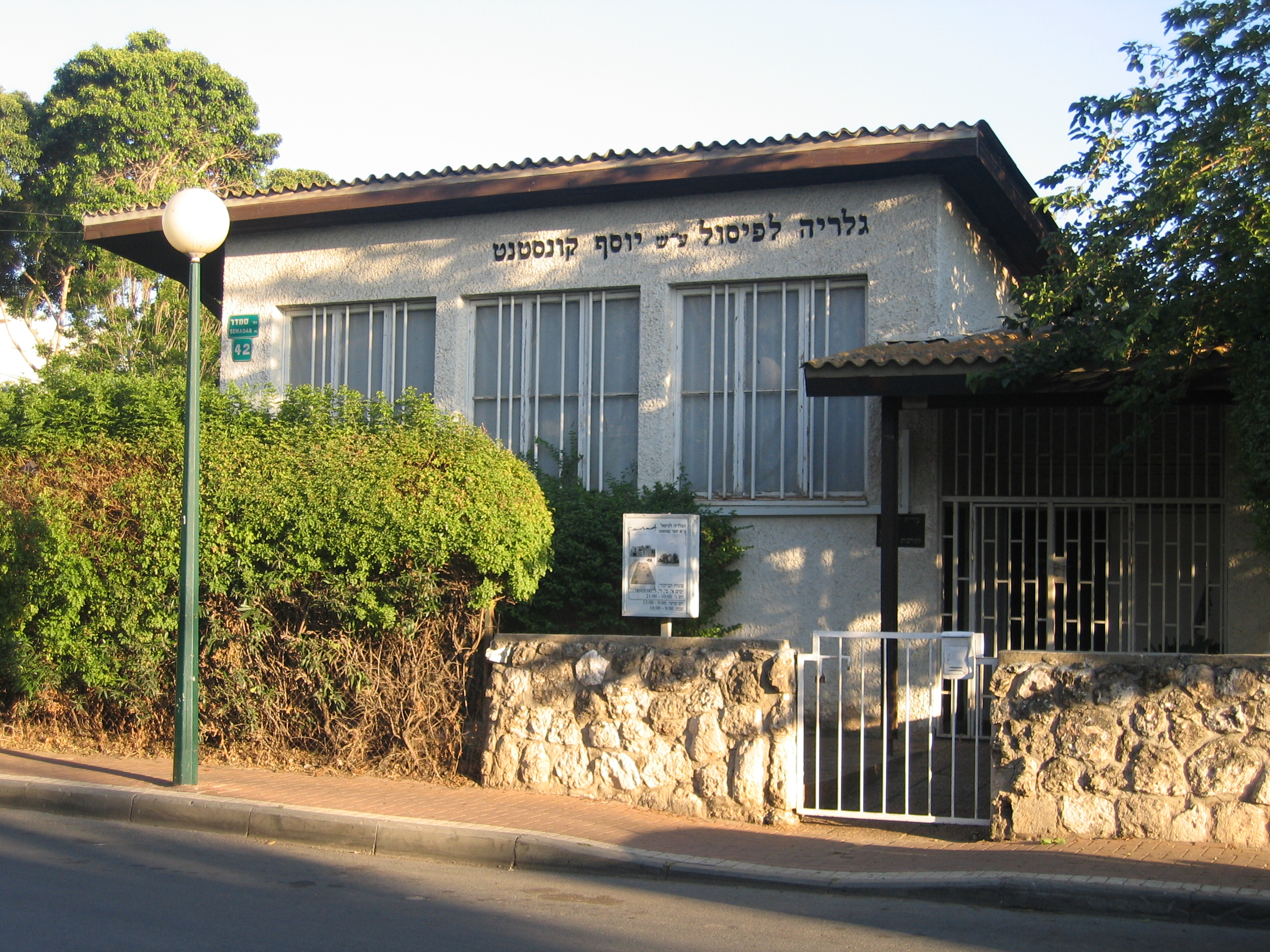
Joseph Constant's House in Ramat Gan.

Constant was born in Jaffa on 14 July 1892 to Russian Jewish parents. He spent his early years in Odessa. When still quite young, he took part alongside his father in the anti-Tsarist revolutionary activities of 1905. In 1914, he entered the Academy of Fine Arts in Odessa, and during the Communist Revolution of 1917 he was named an inspector of fine arts.

In 1919, his father and his brother were killed in an anti-Jewish pogrom. That same year, Constant and his wife decided to quit Russia. They travelled to Palestine aboard the ship Ruslan which carried a number of other Jewish artists. In Tel Aviv, they formed an artists' cooperative called HaTomer that included the painter Yitzhak Frenkel. He and Frenkel both taught art in the Herzliya Hebrew Gymnasium. A year later, the ailing Constant travelled to Egypt. He arrived in Paris in 1923 after further travels in Turkey and Romania. He and Isaac Frenkel both resisted the hegemony of the Bezalel art school, both believing in modern art and influenced by the art of the École de Paris.

== Paris: Writer and Artist ==
In Paris, Constant frequented the district of Montparnasse, a favorite milieu of Russian Jewish artists. This served as the inspiration for his later novel La cité des peintres. Adopting the pseudonym of Michel Matveev, Constant was a late arrival to the literary scene. In his own words, it happened "un peu par hasard et pour gagner quelque argent" (a little bit by chance and to earn a little money). It was not until he arrived in France that he began to write, and he did so directly in French.

His first book, on the subject of the 1905 Revolution, was published in 1928. In the 1930s, he gradually abandoned the medium of painting, focusing instead on sculpture. He also continued his activity as a writer and translator. In 1933, he published Les Traqués, a tragic story of Jews travelling across Europe in search of a safe haven. This was translated into English by Desmond Flower under the title Weep Not for the Dead. In 1936, he won the Prix des Deux Magots for his collection of short stories Étrange famille (Strange family).

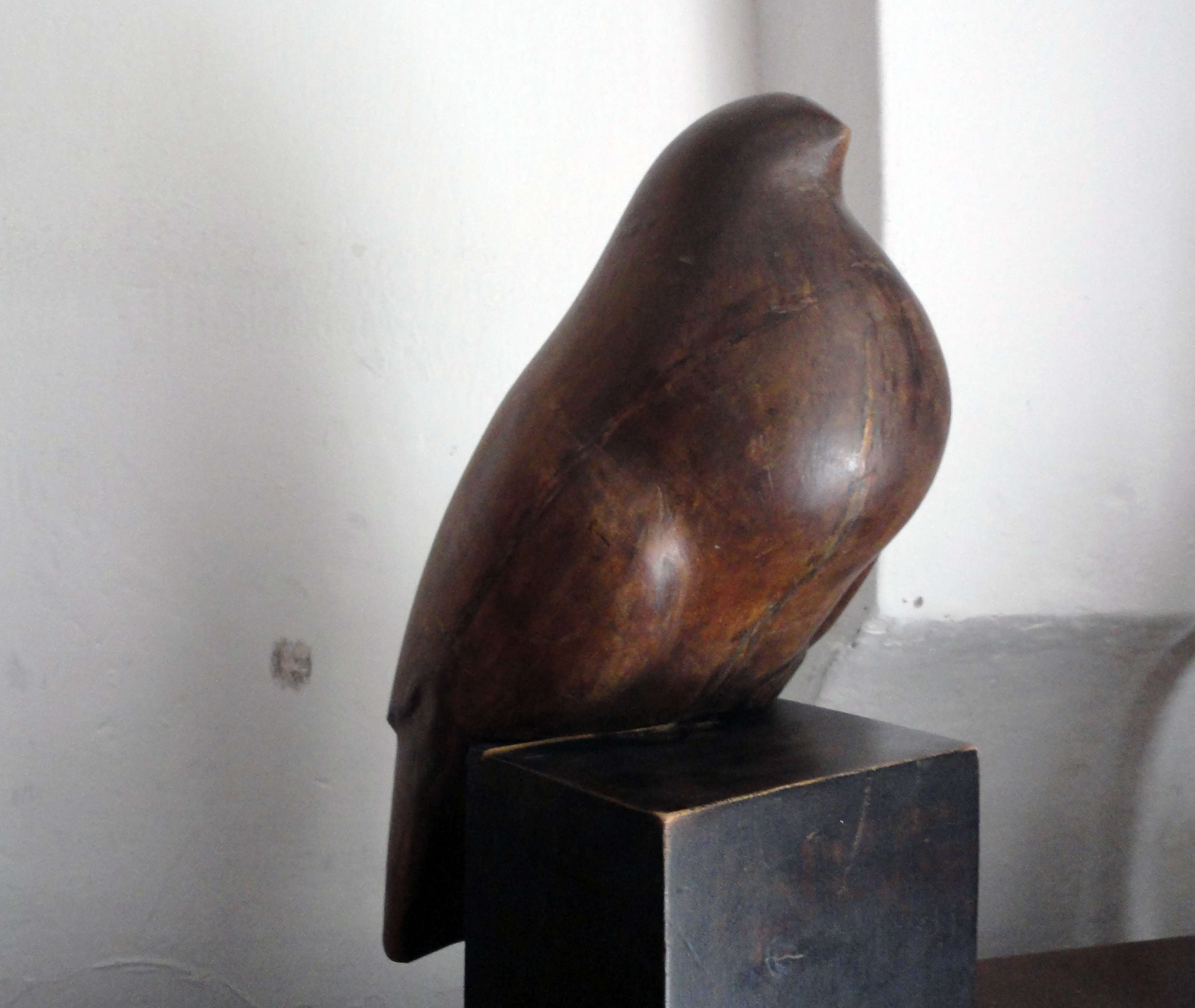
Bird Statue, in the Ticho House

== Between Paris and Ramat Gan ==
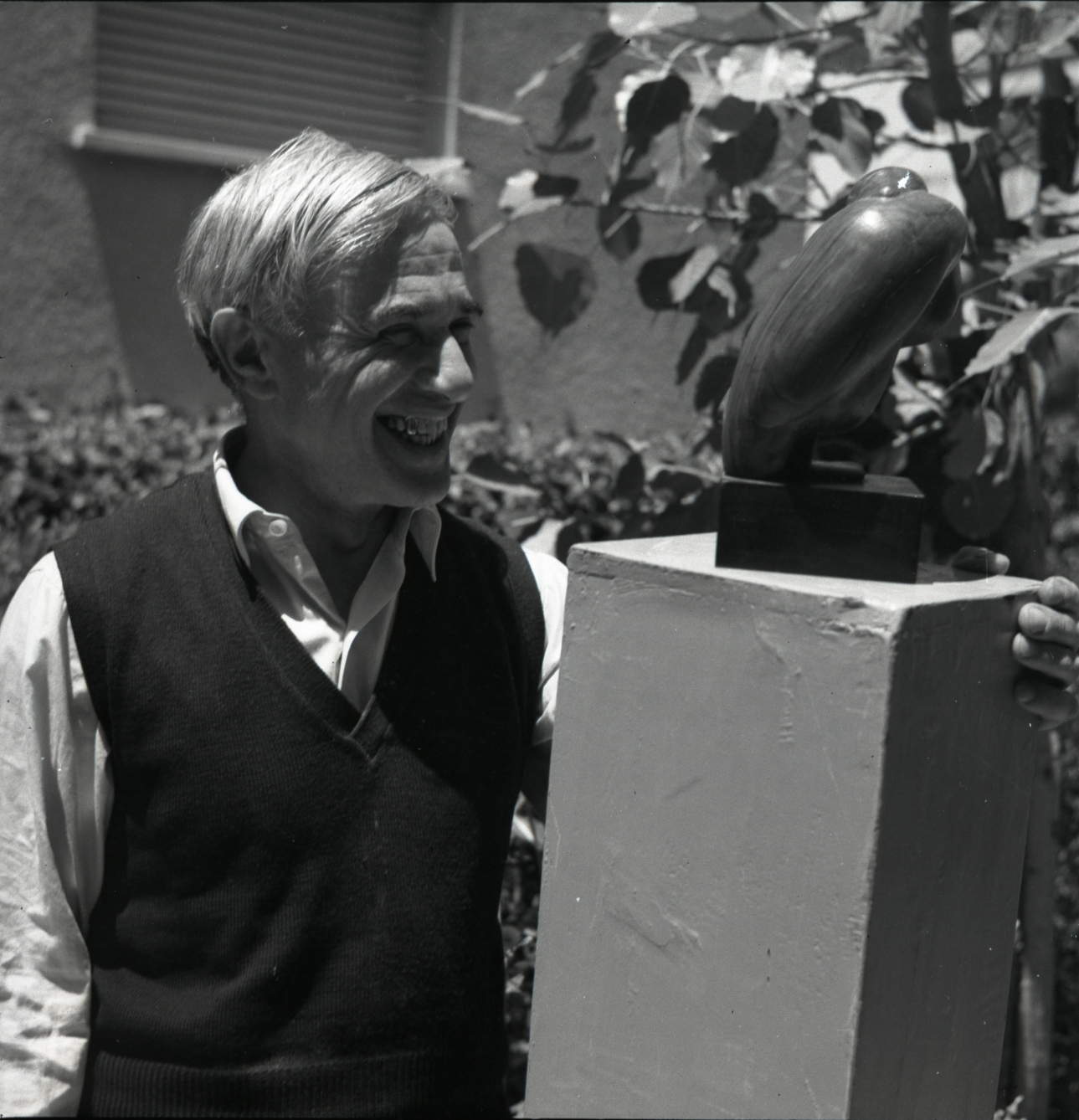
Joseph Constant and his sculpture

After the Second World War, he gained greater renown as a sculptor both in France and abroad. From the 1950s onwards, he travelled frequently to Israel, staying at the kibbutz of Ein Harod. In 1962, the mayor of Ramat Gan invited him to take up residence in the artists' quarter in the heart of the city. From then on, Constant shared his time between his studio in Paris and that in Ramat Gan. The latter was converted into a museum upon his death.

In 1959, he wrote his last novel Ailleurs, autrefois, a semi-autobiographical work in which he evoked his childhood and youth in Ukraine at the turn of the century. He died on 3 October 1969, in Paris.

== Selected writings ==
- 1933: Les Traqués, éditions Gallimard
- 1936: Étrange Famille, éditions Gallimard; Prix des Deux Magots
- 1947: La Cité des peintres, éditions Atlas
- 1959: Ailleurs autrefois, éditions Gallimard
