= Embassy of Israel, Beijing =

Official diplomatic mission of Israel in China

Embassy of Israel in Beijing Hebrew: שגרירות ישראל בבייג'ינג Chinese: 以色列駐華大使館
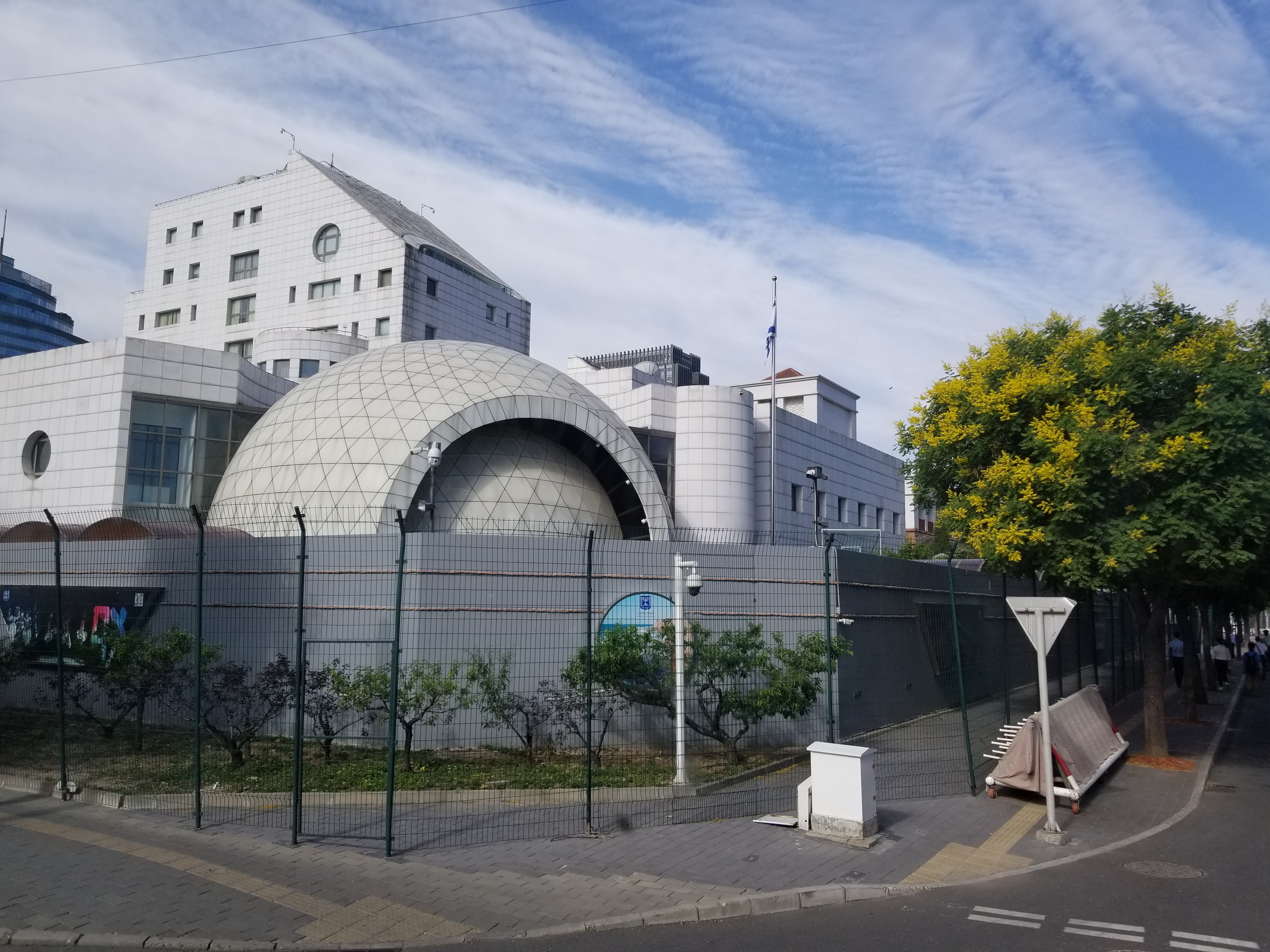
- Location: Chaoyang District, Beijing, China
- Address: 17 Tianze St., Chaoyang District, Beijing
- Coordinates: 39°57′12″N 116°28′08″E
- Ambassador: Irit Ben-Abba
- Website: embassies.gov.il/beijing

Embassy of Israel in Beijing (Hebrew: שגרירות ישראל בבייג'ינג ; Chinese: 以色列駐華大使館) is the official diplomatic mission of the State of Israel in the People's Republic of China. The embassy was opened in 1992, and the current ambassador is Irit Ben-Abba.

== History ==
=== Formation of Relations ===
The first Israeli mission in China operated in Shanghai for several months between 1948 and 1949, and was managed by Moshe Yuval. This mission was mainly focused on the resettlement of Jewish war refugees in Europe and the Chinese Jewish community to Israel, and most Chinese Jews resided in Harbin. From December 1948 to the spring of 1949, about 4,500 Jews immigrated to Israel, including the leaders of the Zionist movement in Shanghai.

With the gradual rapprochement of Israel-China relations in the late 1980s, the Israeli Foreign Ministry began to examine options for establishing a representative office in Beijing, before formal diplomatic relations were even established, because this would allow a direct access channel to convey messages between the Israeli and Chinese authorities. At the time, Israeli relations with China were managed through the Israeli consulate in Hong Kong, which was still a British colony. The Israelis were successful, and a liaison office of the Israel Academy of Sciences was inaugurated in Beijing in February 1990. Yoel Gilat, an employee of the Ministry of Foreign Affairs, was assigned as Shalhab's administrative assistant. According to Shalhab,

"The Liaison Office of the Israeli Academy of Sciences consisted of three people: me as the head of the delegation, my wife Sheila, the deputy head of the delegation, and Yoel Gilat, a member of the Ministry of Foreign Affairs. We worked to bring hearts closer between China and Israel, we promoted official ties, studying China's science system and establishing ties between Chinese and Israelis."

Later that year, Foreign Ministry Director General Reuven Merhav agreed with the Chinese ambassador to the UN that the Israeli scientific delegation would be augmented by a " political advisor ". Zev Sufott was appointed to the position, where he went to Beijing in February 1991 and became the contact person between the two governments. On January 24, 1992, full diplomatic relations were established between Israel and China, and Sufott was appointed as the first ambassador.

=== After Relations were established ===
The embassy in Beijing has become one of Israel's largest diplomatic missions worldwide, and its staff has been significantly expanded over time. This is in part due to the increased economic cooperation between the two nations.

Alongside the embassy, Israel operates three consulates in China: they are in Shanghai, Guangzhou, and Hong Kong.

On October 13, an embassy employee was stabbed outside the embassy building in an attack during the Gaza war.

== Embassy Building ==
The embassy building was established in 2004 at a cost of approximately 12.5 million dollars. The building was designed as a two-story horseshoe surrounding an inner courtyard, with its architecture considered as "Israeli style". This is reflected through the balconies used for entertaining and the bright white color of the building walls - elements that are common in Israeli, not Chinese, architecture. The building is actually a large-scale complex, which houses not only the embassy offices, but also the residences of the ambassador, the consuls and the various attachments and their families who live in a close community.

== List of ambassadors ==
- Zev Sufott (זאב סופות) (1992-1993)
- Moshe Ben-Yaacov (משה בן-יעקב) (1993-1996)
- Ora Namir (אורה נמיר) (1996-2000)
- Itzhak Shelef (יצחק שלף) (2000-2002)
- Yehoyada Haim (יהוידע חיים) (2002-2007)
- Amos Nadai (עמוס נדאי) (2007-2011)
- Matan Vilnai (מתן וילנאי) (2011-2017)
- Zvi Heifetz (2017-2021)
- Irit Ben-Abba (2021-2025)
- Eli Belotsercovsky (2025-present)

== See also ==
- China–Israel relations
- Embassy of China, Tel Aviv
- List of diplomatic missions of Israel
- List of diplomatic missions in China
