= Kiryat Shaul Cemetery =

National cemetery in Israel

- בית העלמין קריית שאול
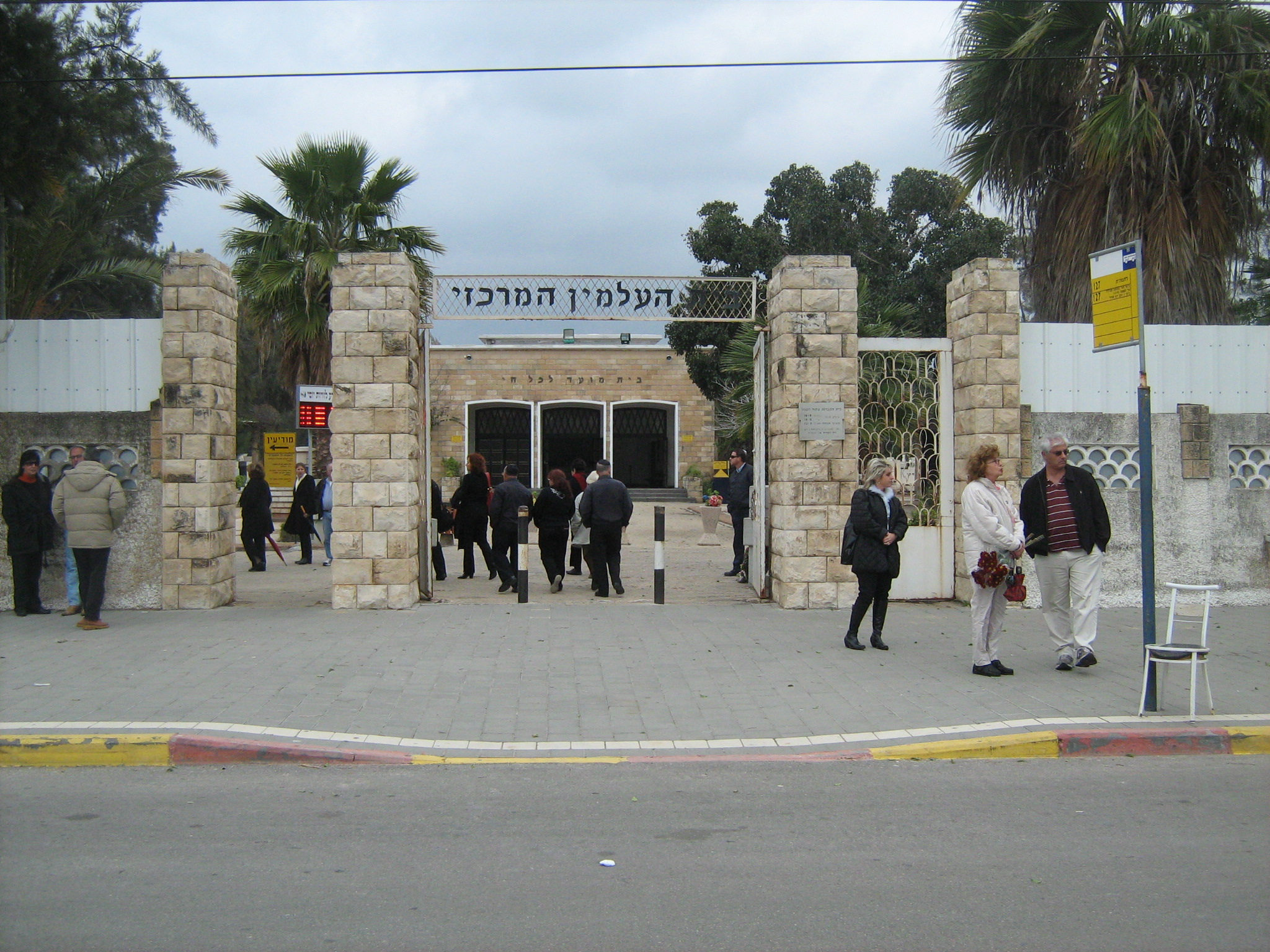
- Entrance to the Kiryat Shaul Cemetery
- Interactive map of Kiryat Shaul Cemetery

Details
- Established: 1943
- Location: Tel Aviv
- Country: Israel
- Coordinates: 32.12916°N 34.82361°E
- Type: Jewish
- Size: 320-dunam
- No. of graves: 80,000
- Website: www.kadisha.biz/ShowItem.aspx?levelId=59577

Kiryat Shaul Cemetery (Hebrew: בית העלמין קריית שאול) is a 320-dunam (32 hectares) Jewish burial ground in Northern Tel Aviv near the neighborhood of Kiryat Shaul. On the east side of the cemetery is a large military cemetery. Founded in 1943, it includes more than 80,000 graves, including those of Israeli political and cultural figures. Due to lack of space, since 1991, the Yarkon Cemetery has been serving as the main cemetery for the Tel Aviv Metropolitan Area.

== History ==
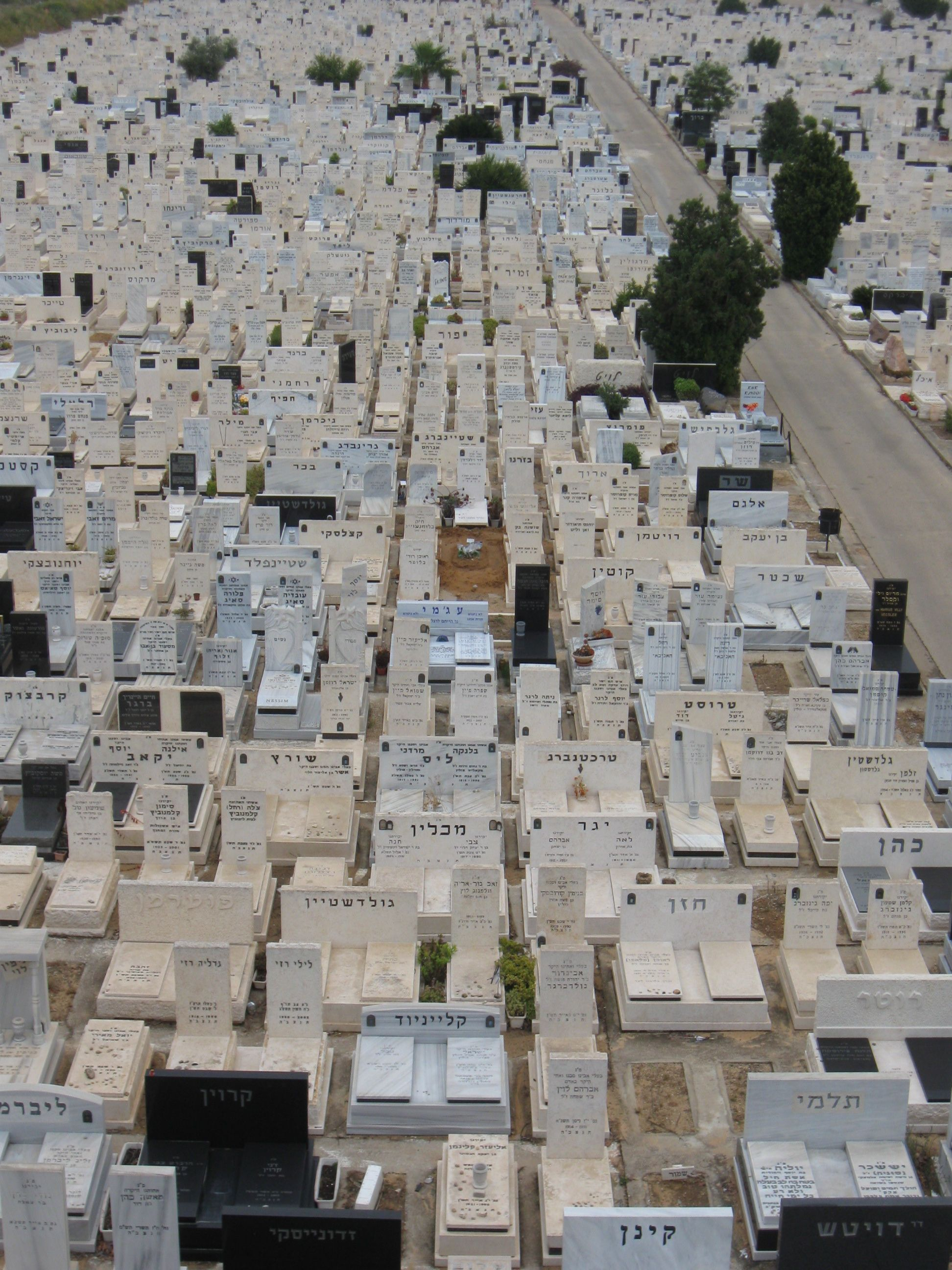

The cemetery was established in 1943 when the Chair of the Religious Council of Tel Aviv, David-Zvi Pinkas, feared that they will run out of burial space in the Nahalat Yitzhak Cemetery. Chairman of the Chevra kadisha, Zalman Meisel, opened in negotiations to purchase the land. The purchase was completed in 1949. During its early years, the cemetery faced strong opposition, particularly from Planning Division at the Ministry of Interior. The opposition slowly subsided the following year.

While the sign above the entrance still say "Central Cemetery", due to dwindling burial places, Yarkon Cemetery which opened in 1991 near Petah Tikva now serves as the main cemetery for the Tel Aviv Metropolitan Area. While Kiryat Shaul still accepts new burials, it is categorized as a "closed cemetery" by Bituah Leumi, allowing the collection of fees.

Like most other cemeteries in Israel, Kiryat Shaul cemetery erected memorials in memory of the victims of The Holocaust. Under some of the monuments are buried the remains, ashes and bones that were brought back from the extermination camps. The memorials include: Jews of Brest, Bukovina, Minsk, Kraków, Slonim, Zamość, Oświęcim, Radom, and Ivano-Frankivsk.

Additionally, there is a dedicated plot for the Righteous Among the Nations and another for victims of terrorist acts. Nearby the entrance to the cemetery is the resting place of five of the victims of the Munich massacre – fencing master Andre Spitzer, wrestlers Mark Slavin and Eliezer Halfin, and coaches Kehat Shorr and Amitzur Shapira. There is also a grave for the remains of the victims of the El Al Flight 402 plane crash that took place over Bulgaria in 1955 as well as a grave for the pilots of El Al Flight 1862 which crashed in Amsterdam, Netherlands in 1992.

The cemetery is the resting place of many of prominent military and cultural figures. Among them – Alexander Penn, Nathan Alterman, Abraham Chalfi, Avraham Shlonsky, Tirza Atar, Dahlia Ravikovitch, Natan Yonatan, Shmulik Chizik, Moshe Shamir, Moshe Vilenski, Mordechai Zeira, Nahum Nardi, Daniel Samborski, Izhak Graziani, Hanna Rovina, Shmuel Rodensky, Yafa Yarkoni, Zev Sufott, Amiram Nir, and many more.

== Burial tower ==
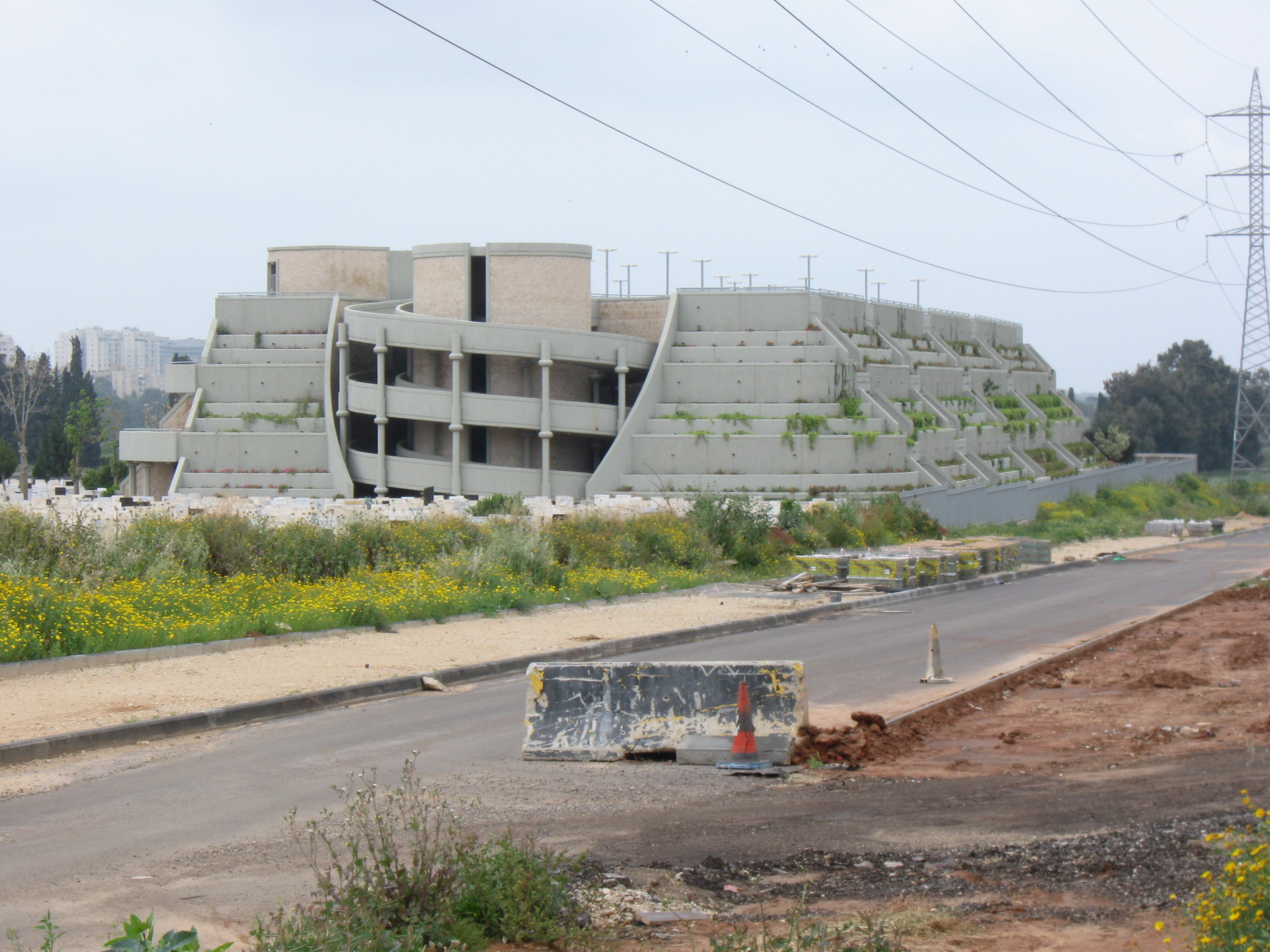
Burial tower

In 1999, additional burial plots were added at the north-west side of the cemetery. On that site a three-story, step-pyramid-shaped building was built. Connecting the floors is a staircase and a ramp. The structure is divided into shaded burial halls and shafts where vegetation grows under direct sunlight. The overall design is based on the Tombs of the Sanhedrin. Family estates can be purchased at the tower.

== Military cemetery ==
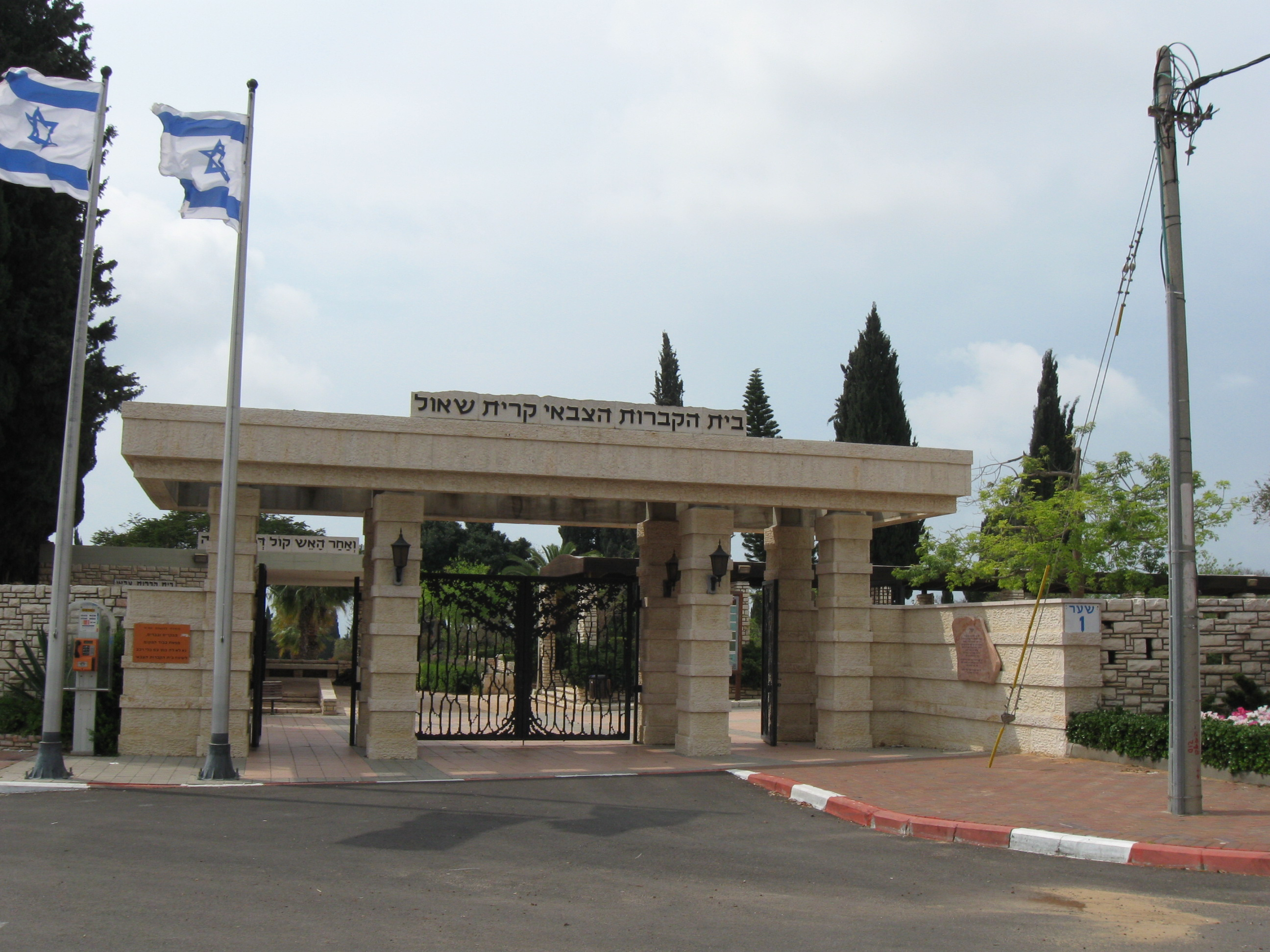
Entrance to the military cemetery

On the eastern side of the cemetery is a large military cemetery.

The cemetery has been the subject of much debate in Israel with a number of controversies that surround it. After Amos Yarkoni died in 1991, it was proposed that he be buried in the Kiryat Shaul Military Cemetery. However, since Yarkoni is not Jewish, this proved to be a major issue (According to Orthodox Jewish burial law, Jews must be buried among Jews.). There was an outcry over the unseemliness of the impediment to burying a hero of the stature of Amos Yarkoni in a military cemetery. The matter was resolved quickly when Rehavam Zeevi, Yarkoni's lifelong friend and comrade, purchased a grave in the cemetery for himself, allowing Yarkoni to be buried at the end of the row, and therefore technically not in the Jewish part of the cemetery.

The incident over Yarkoni's burial, and the increasing numbers of non-Jewish soldiers (especially after the influx from the former Soviet Union in the early 1990s) has seen the system of burial for non-Jews in Jewish military cemeteries streamlined.

== Gallery ==
Kiryat Shaul cemetery
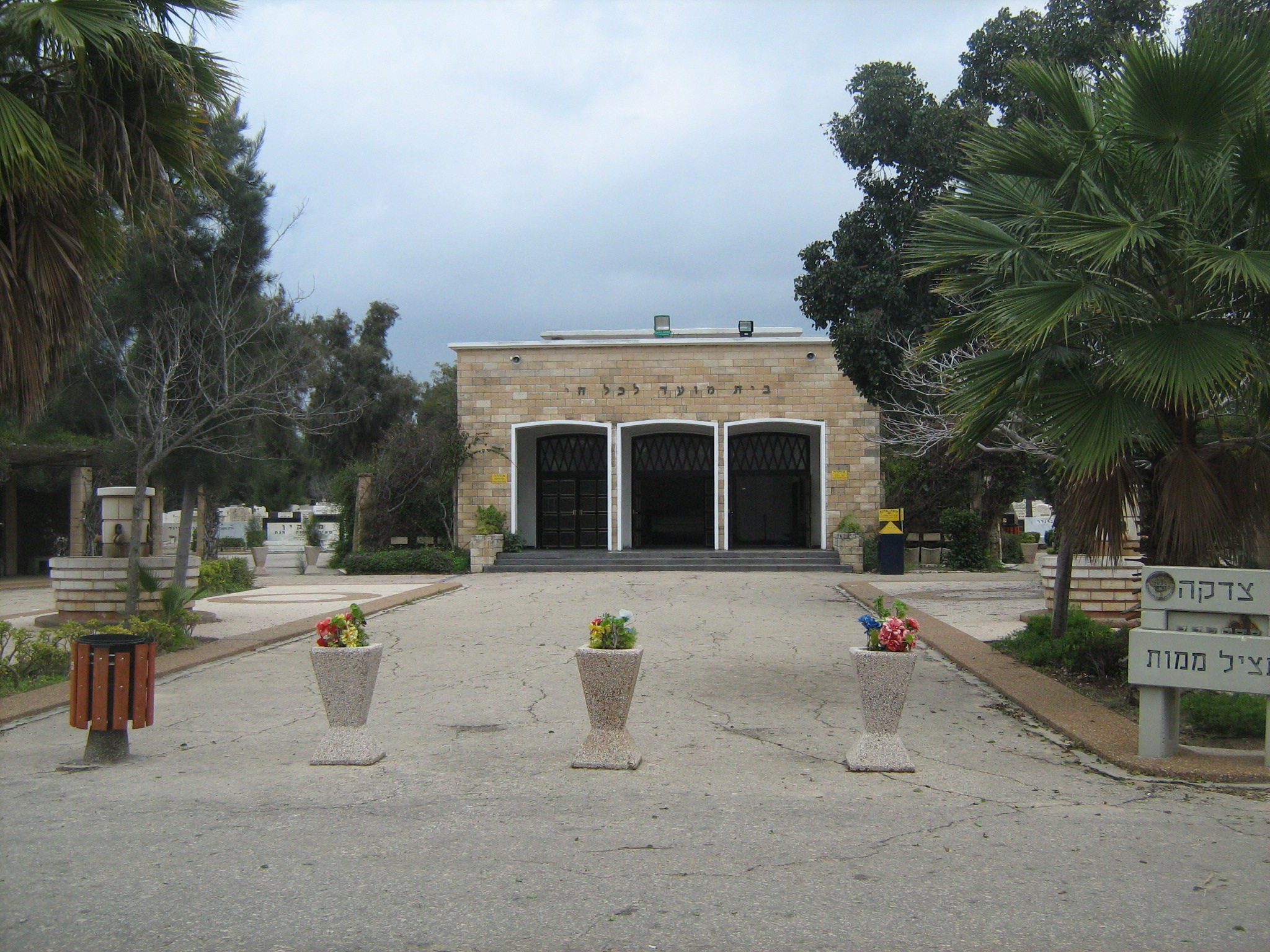

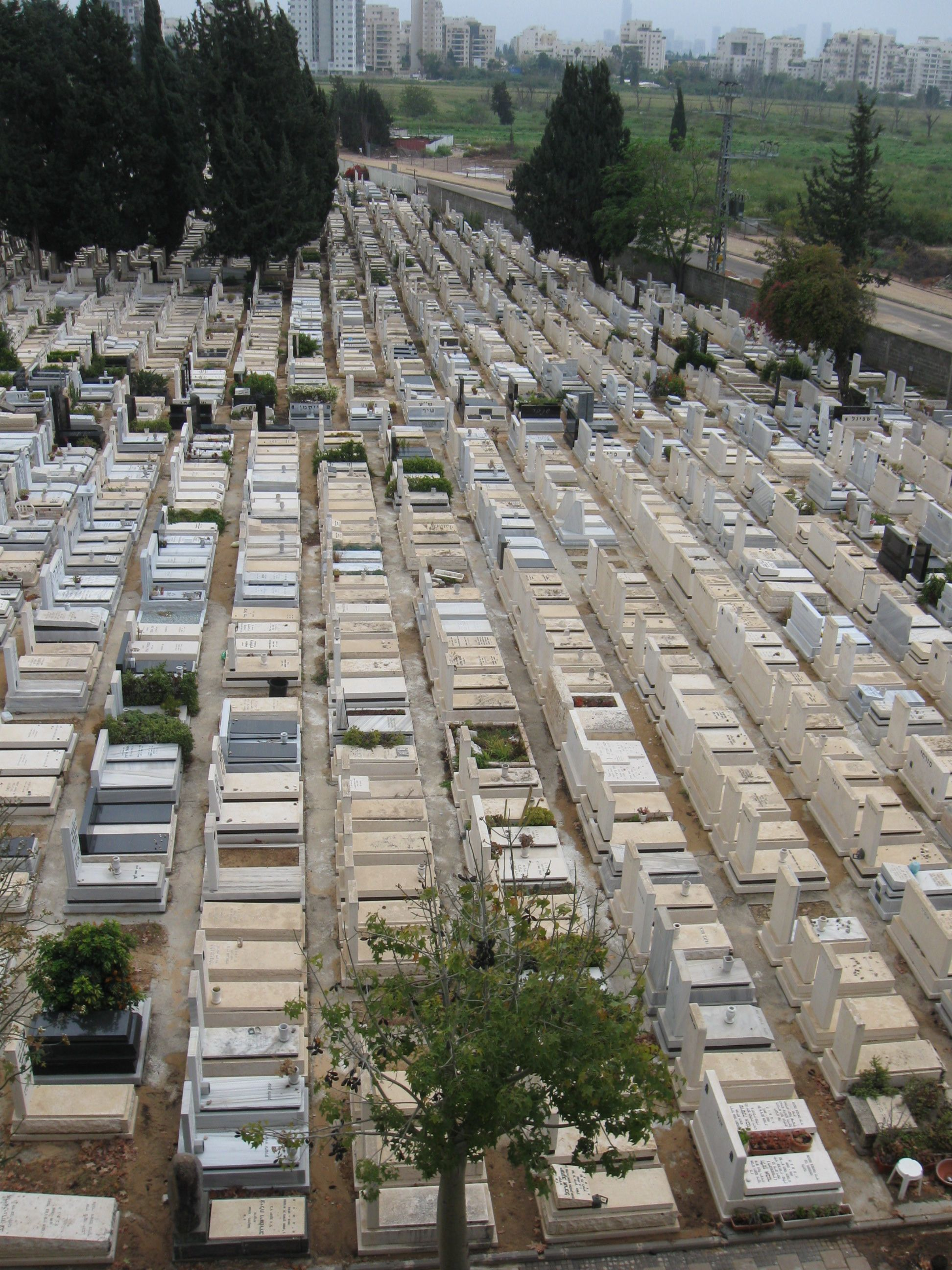

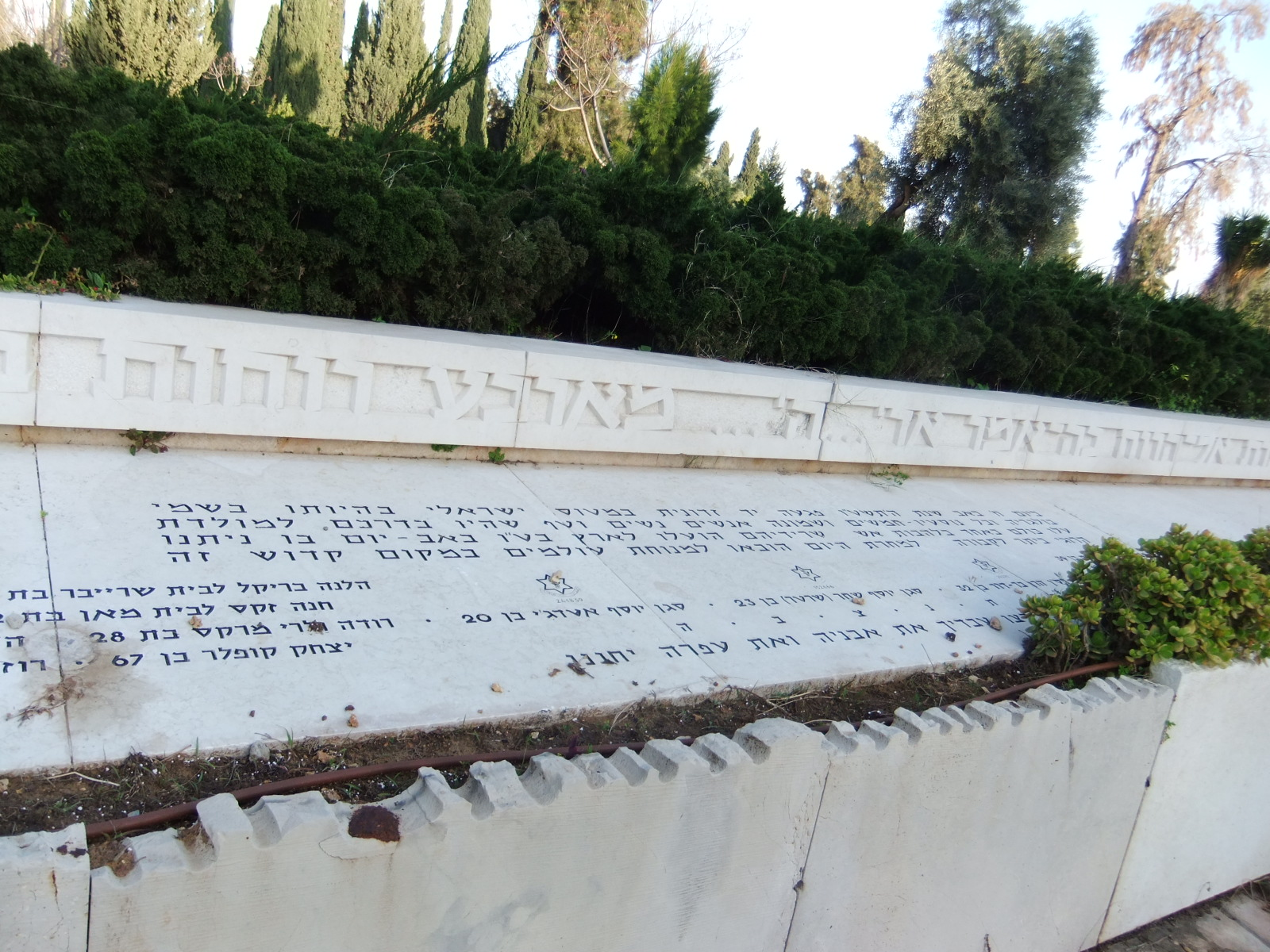
El Al Flight 402 memorial

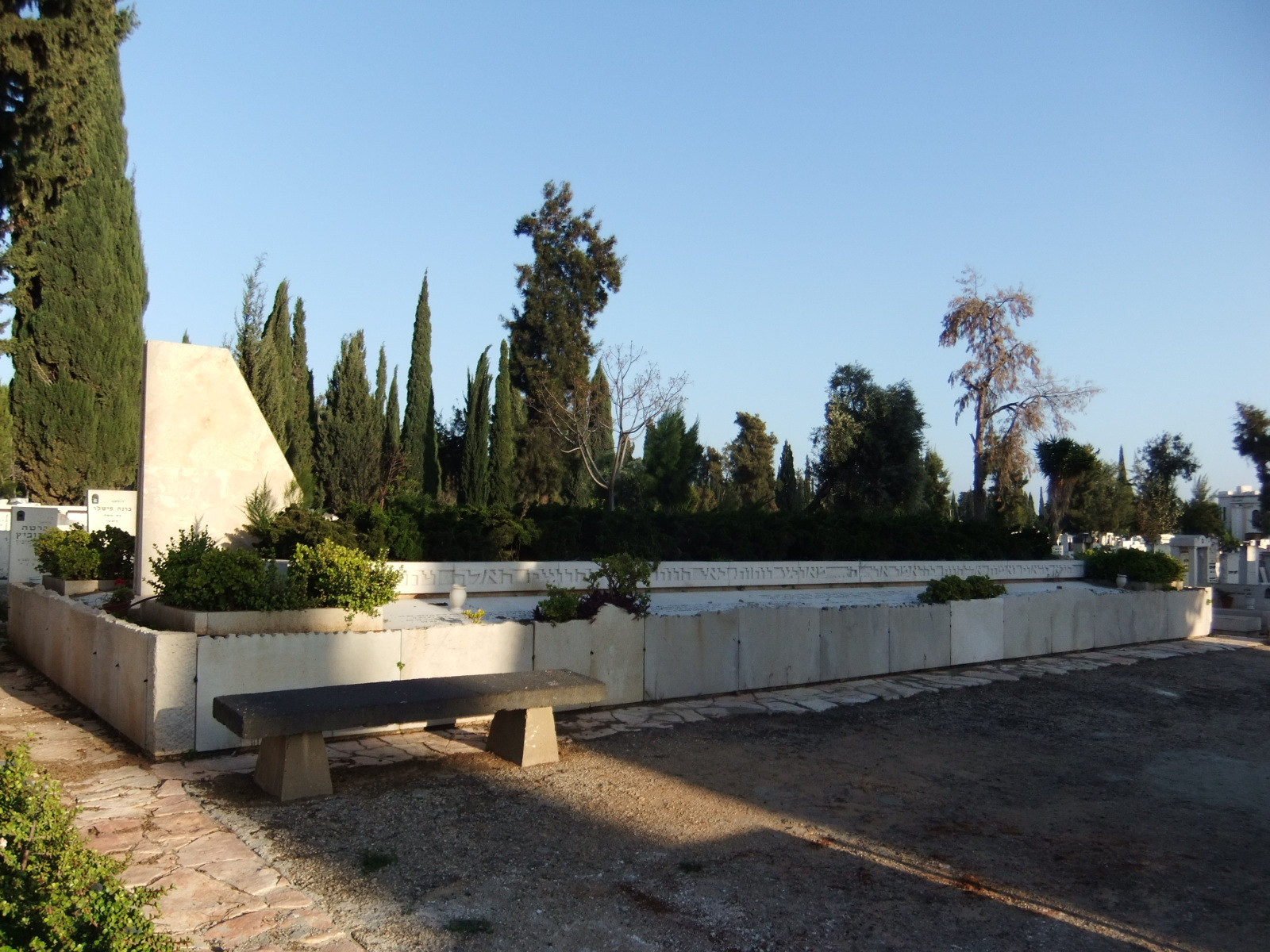
El Al Flight 402 memorial

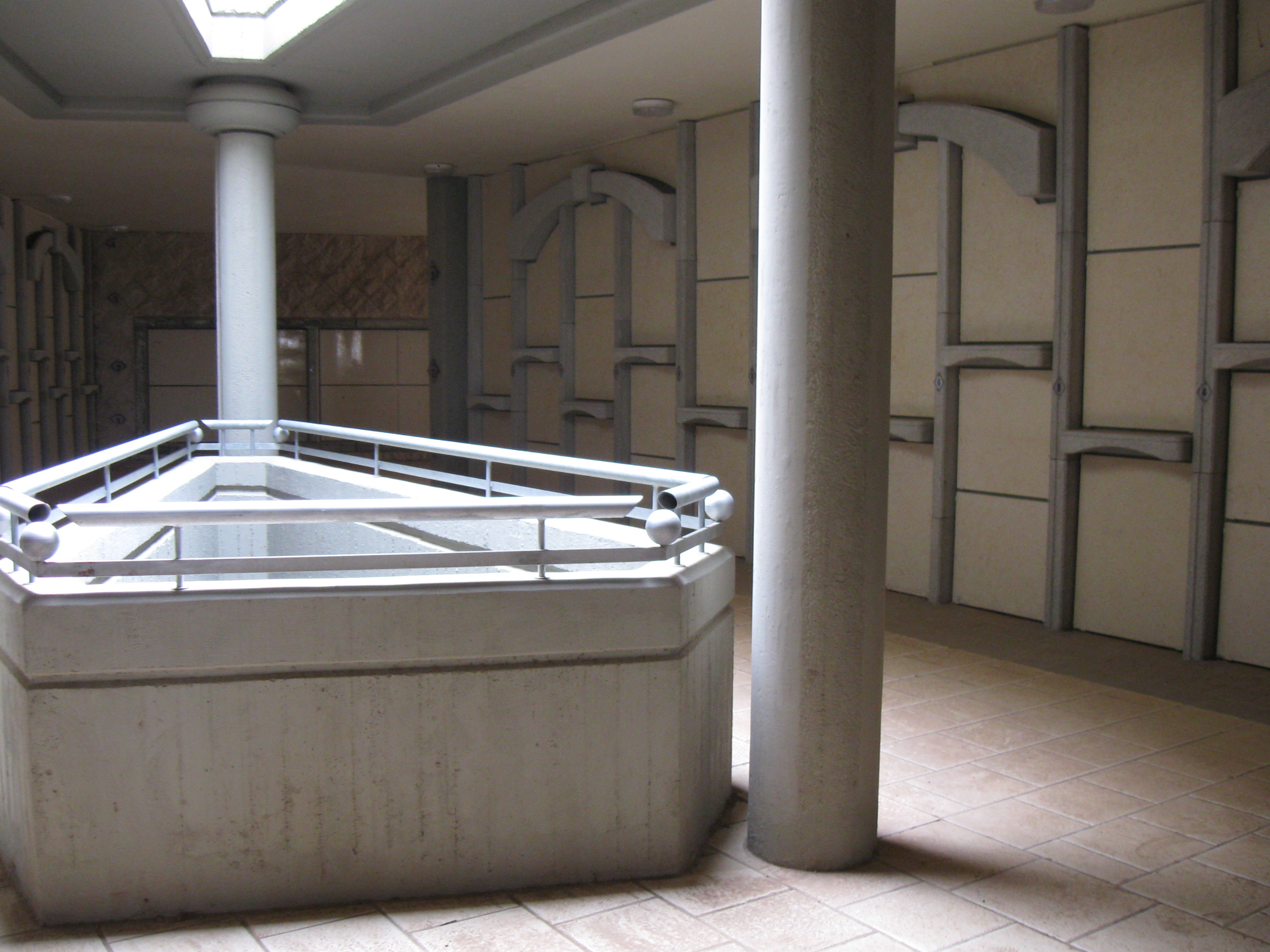
Burial tower

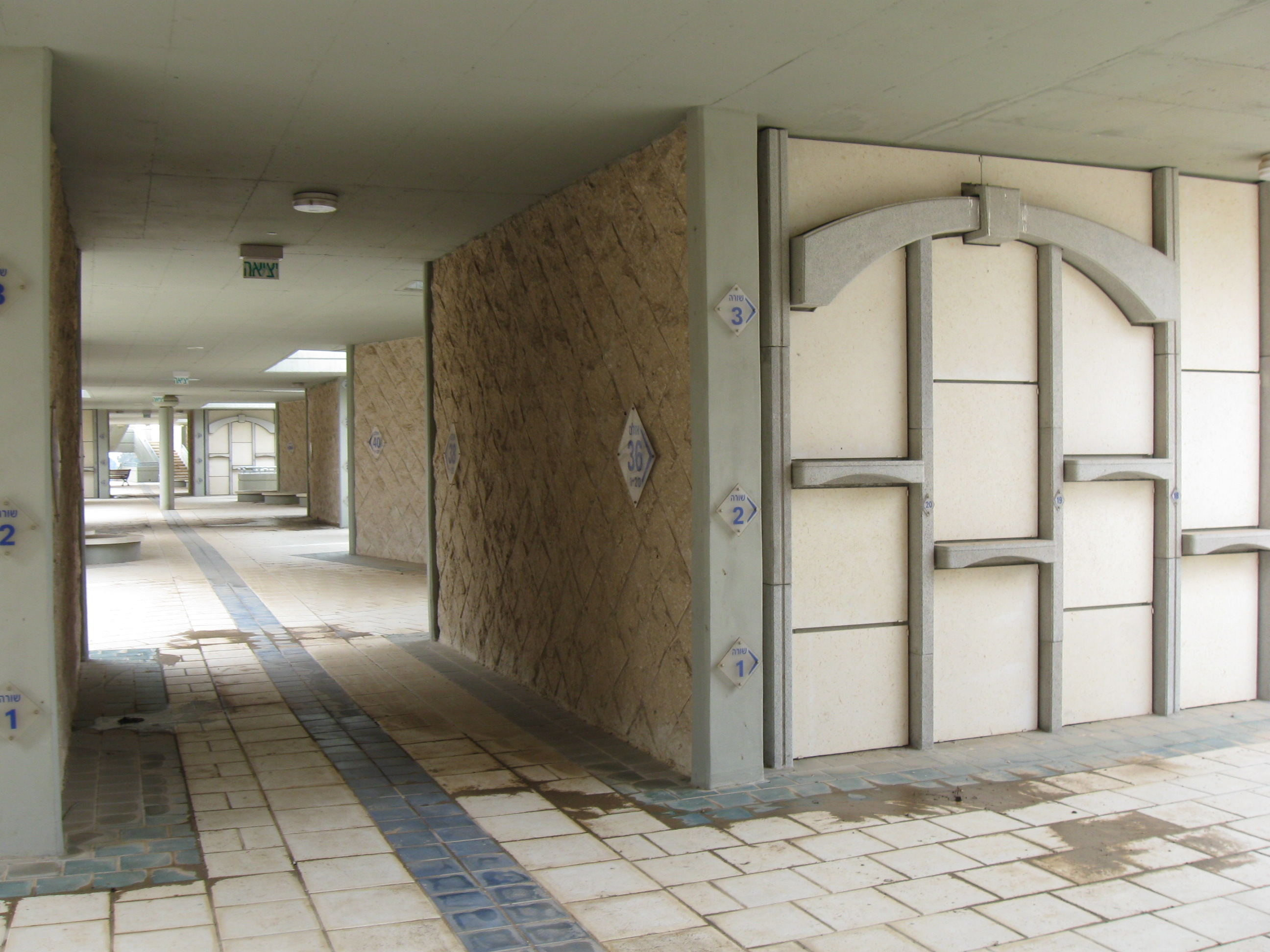
Burial tower

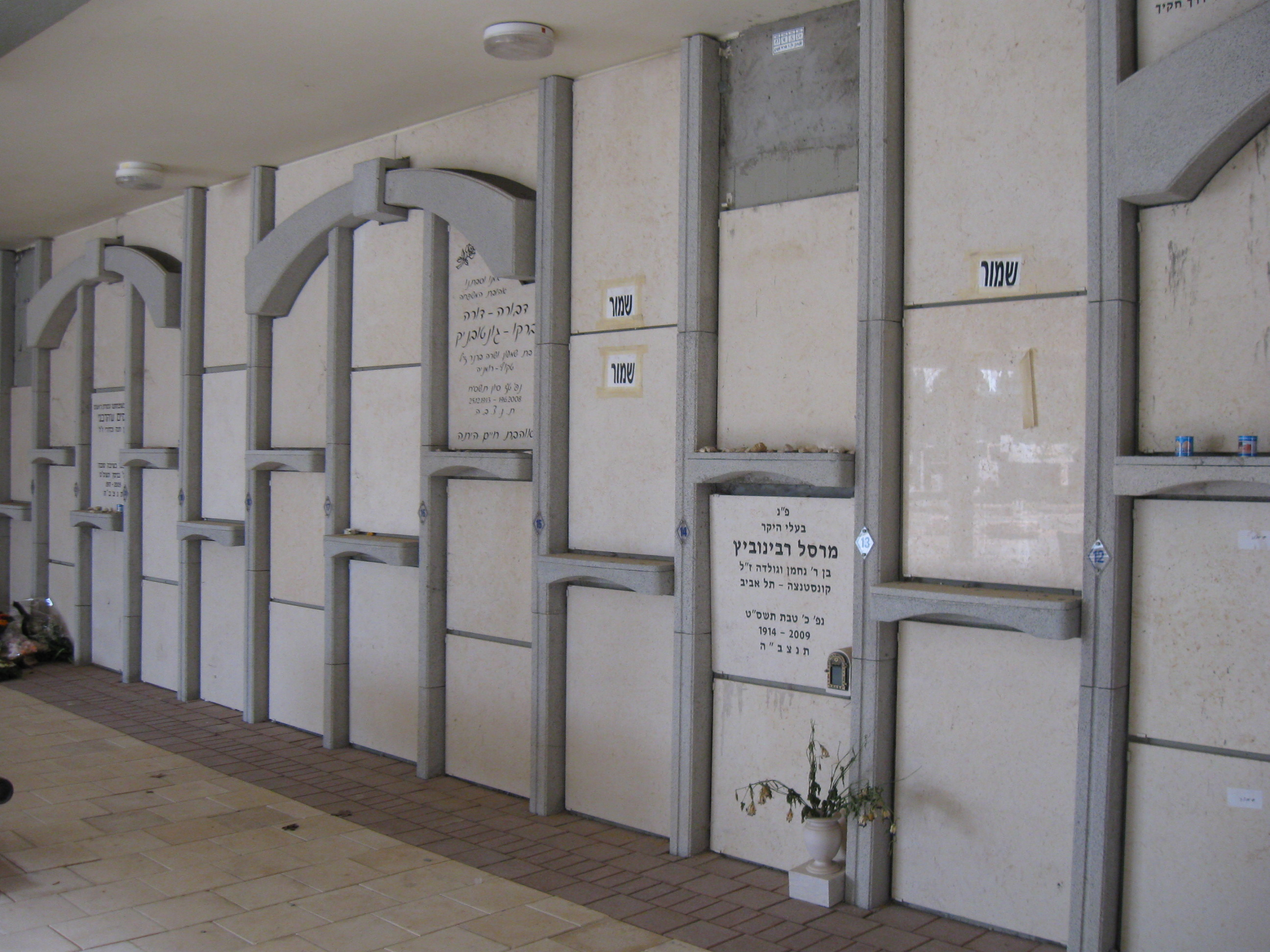
Burial tower

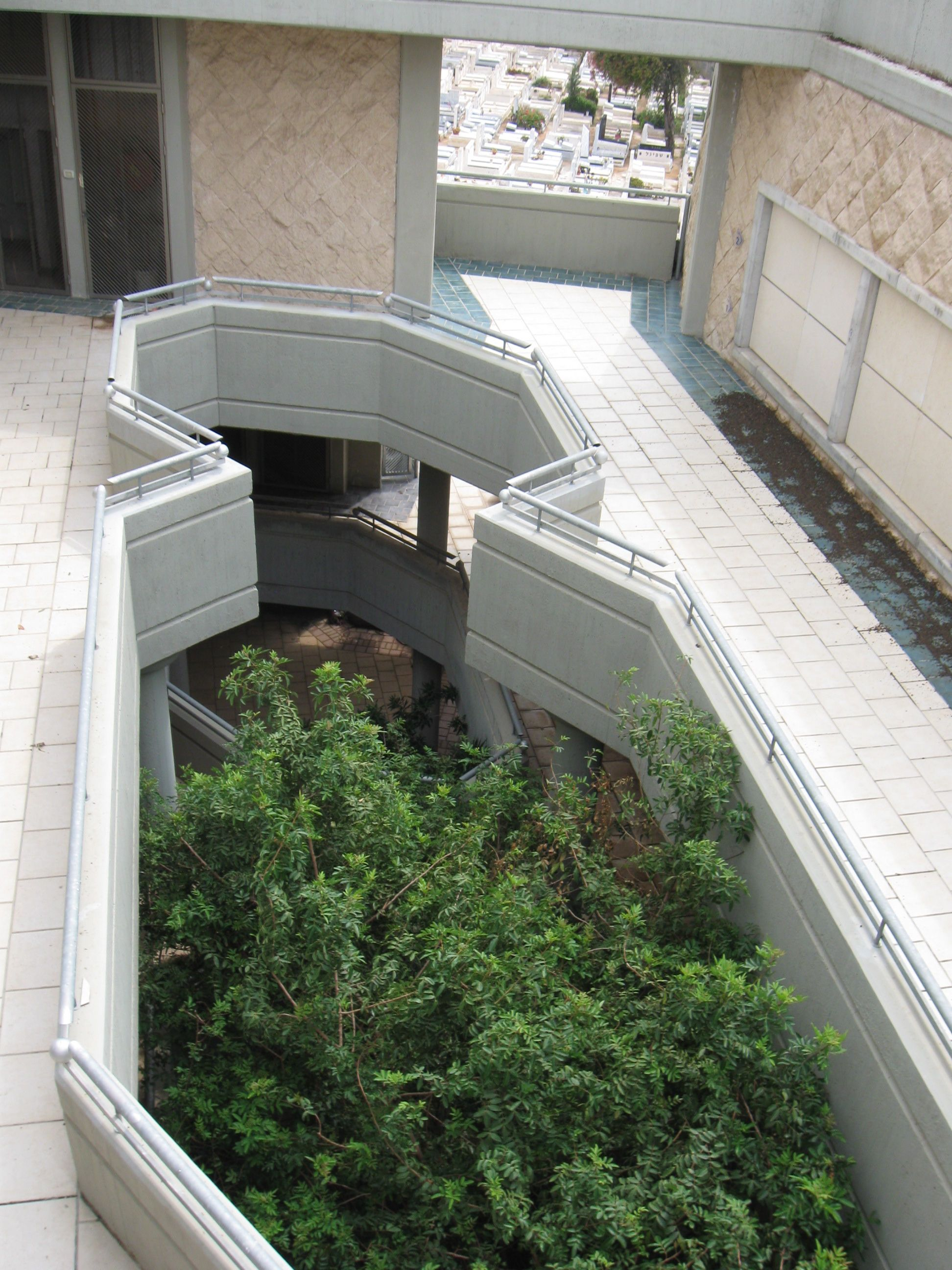
Burial tower

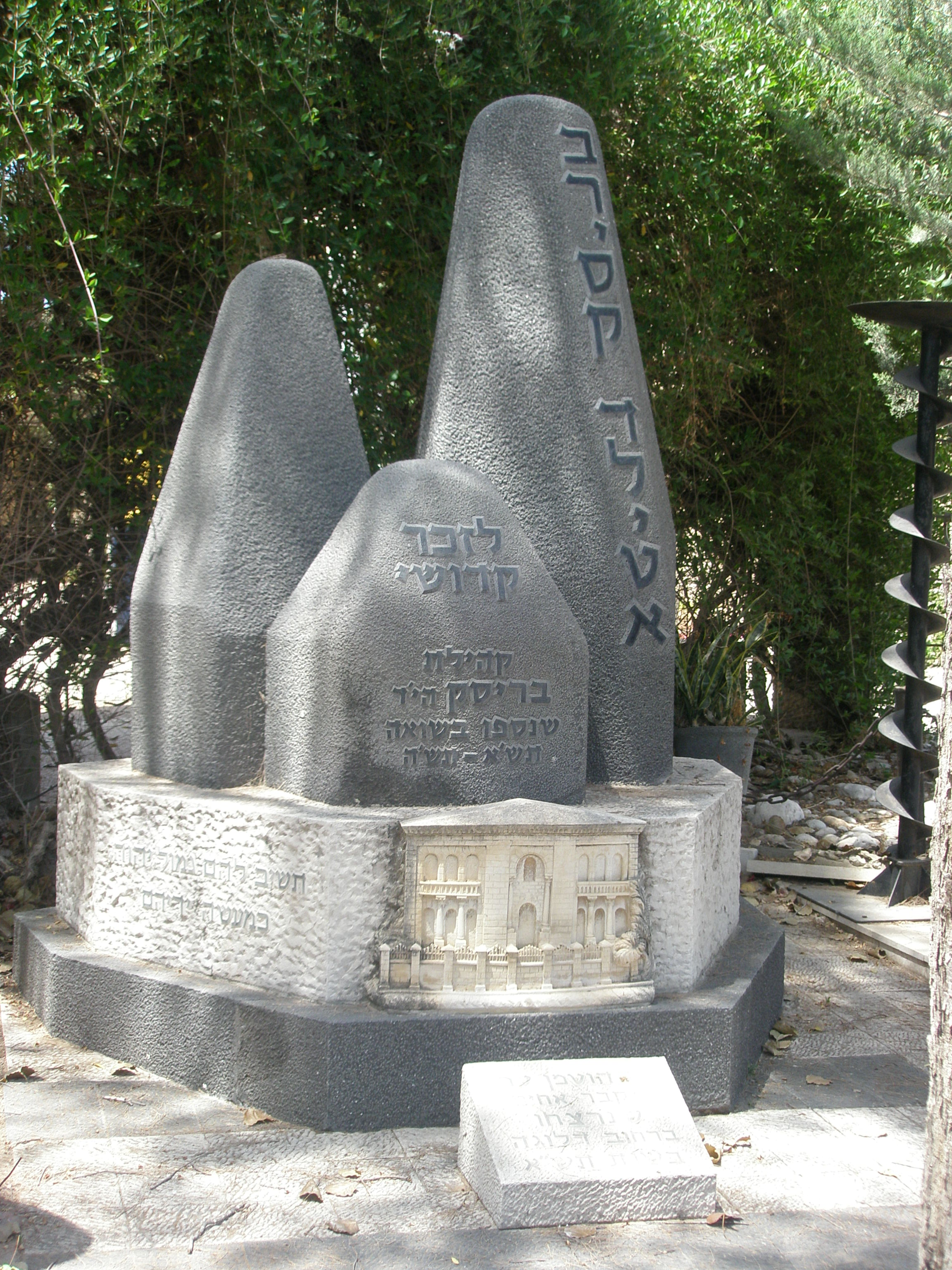
Brest Holocaust memorial

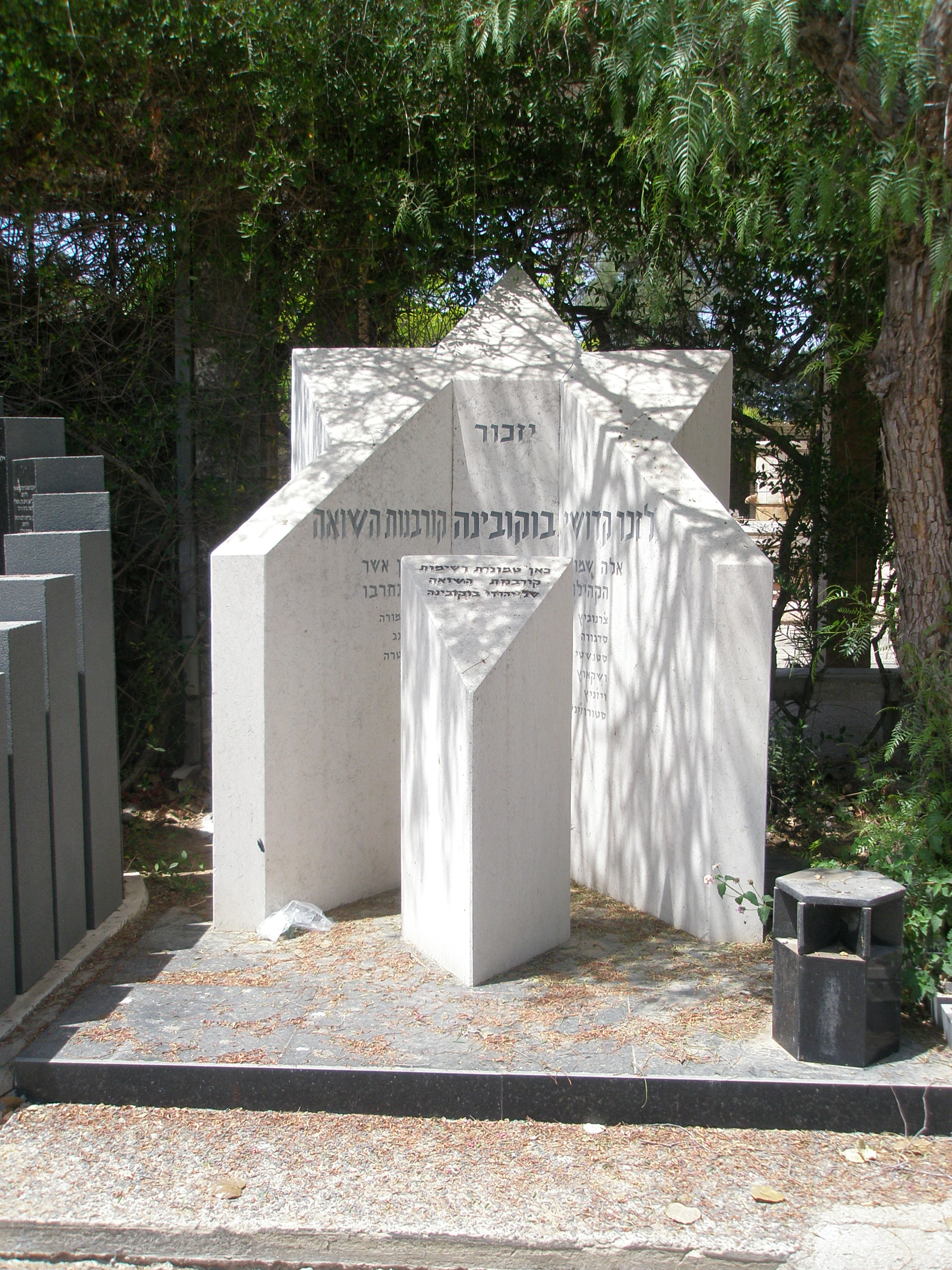
Bukovina Holocaust memorial

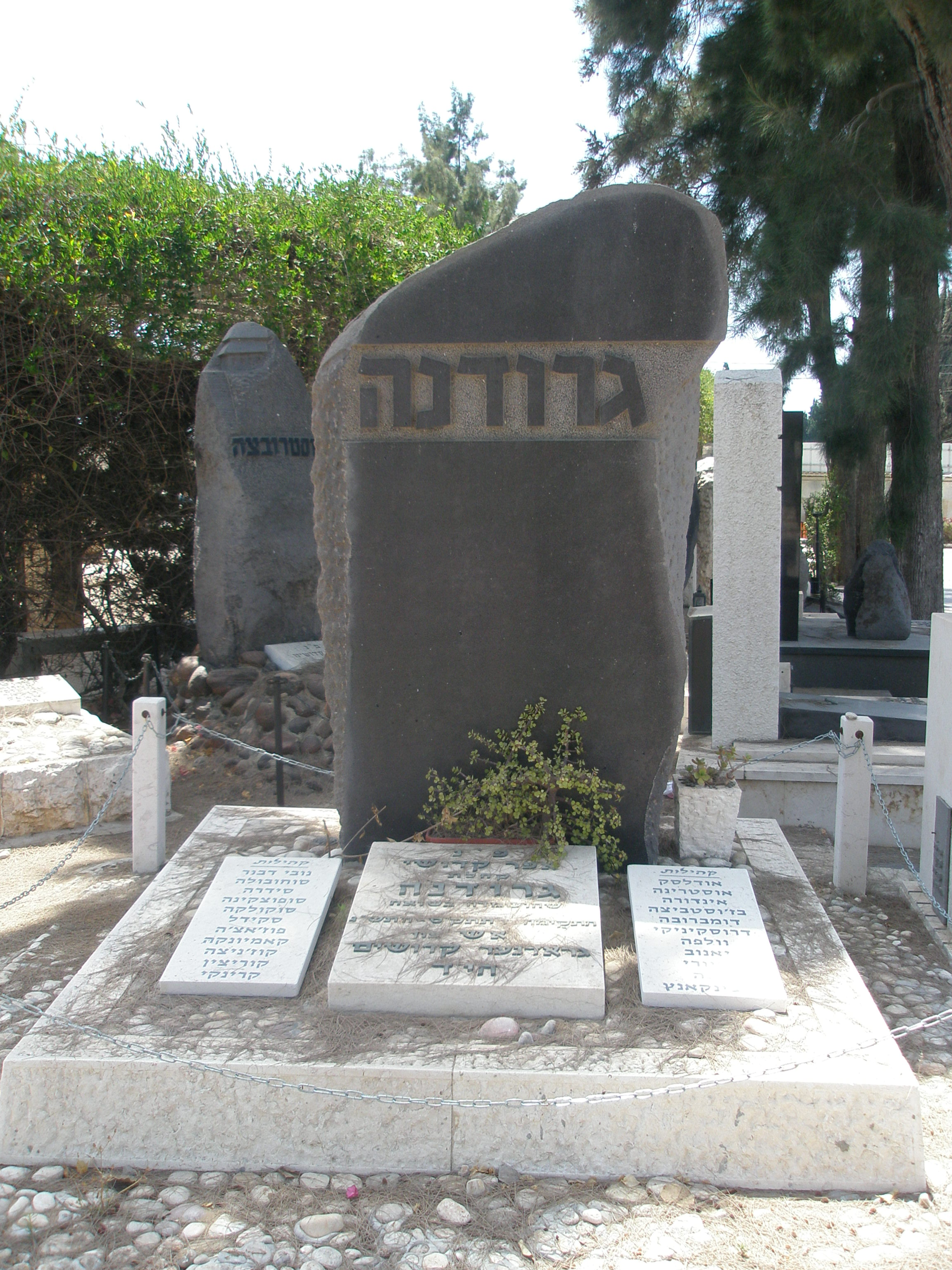
Grodno Ghetto Holocaust memorial

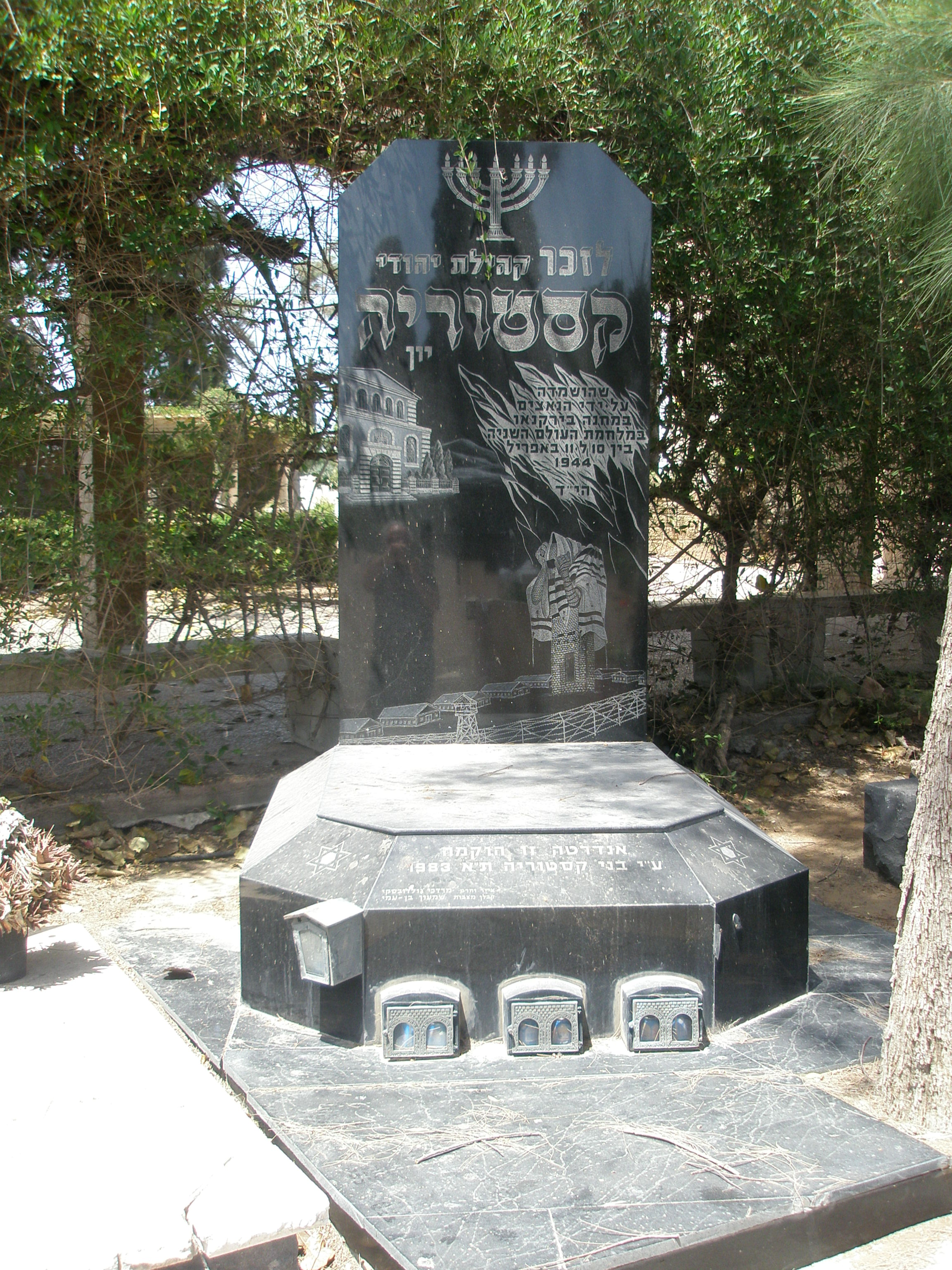
Kastoria Holocaust memorial

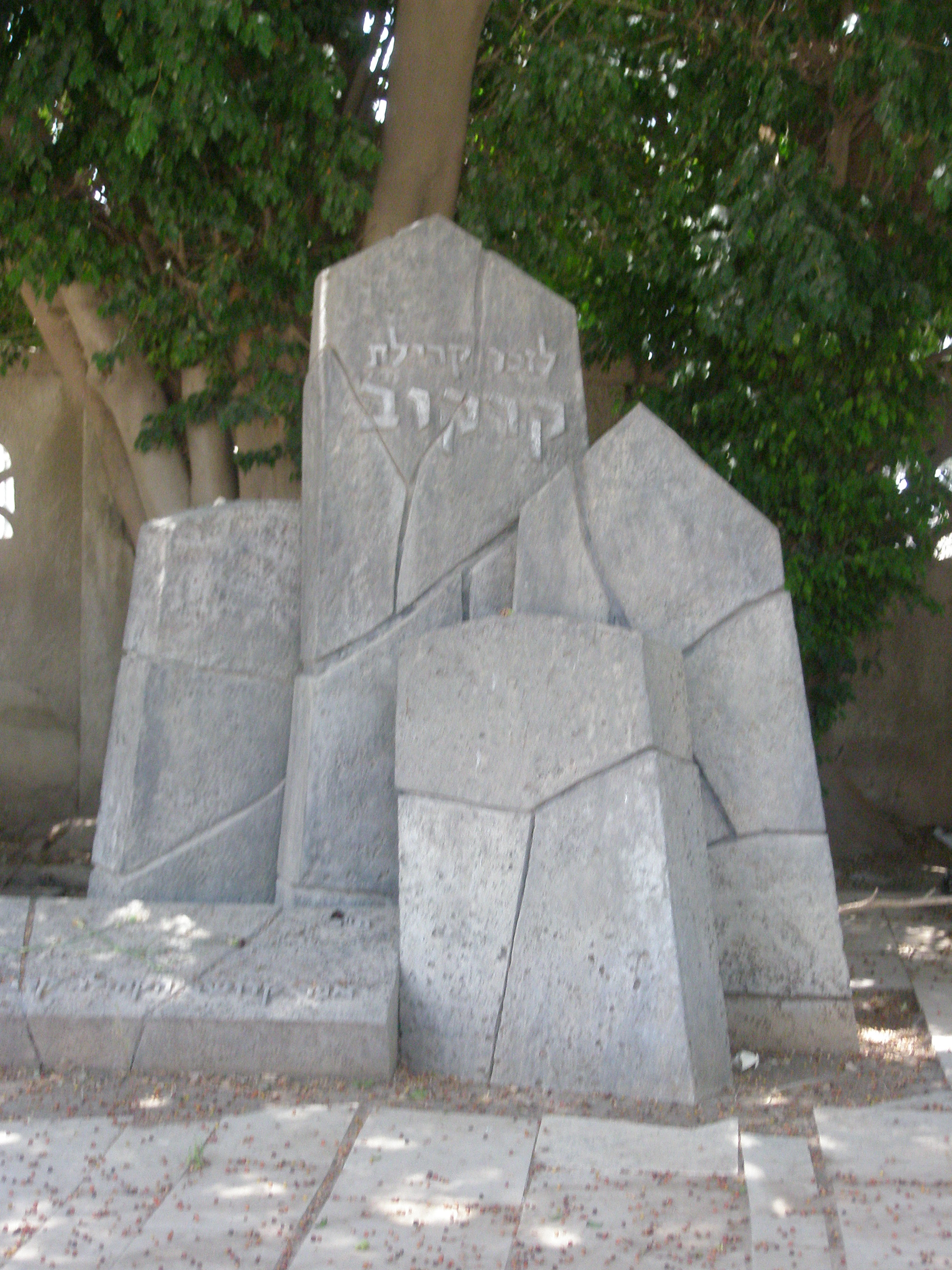
Kraków Holocaust memorial

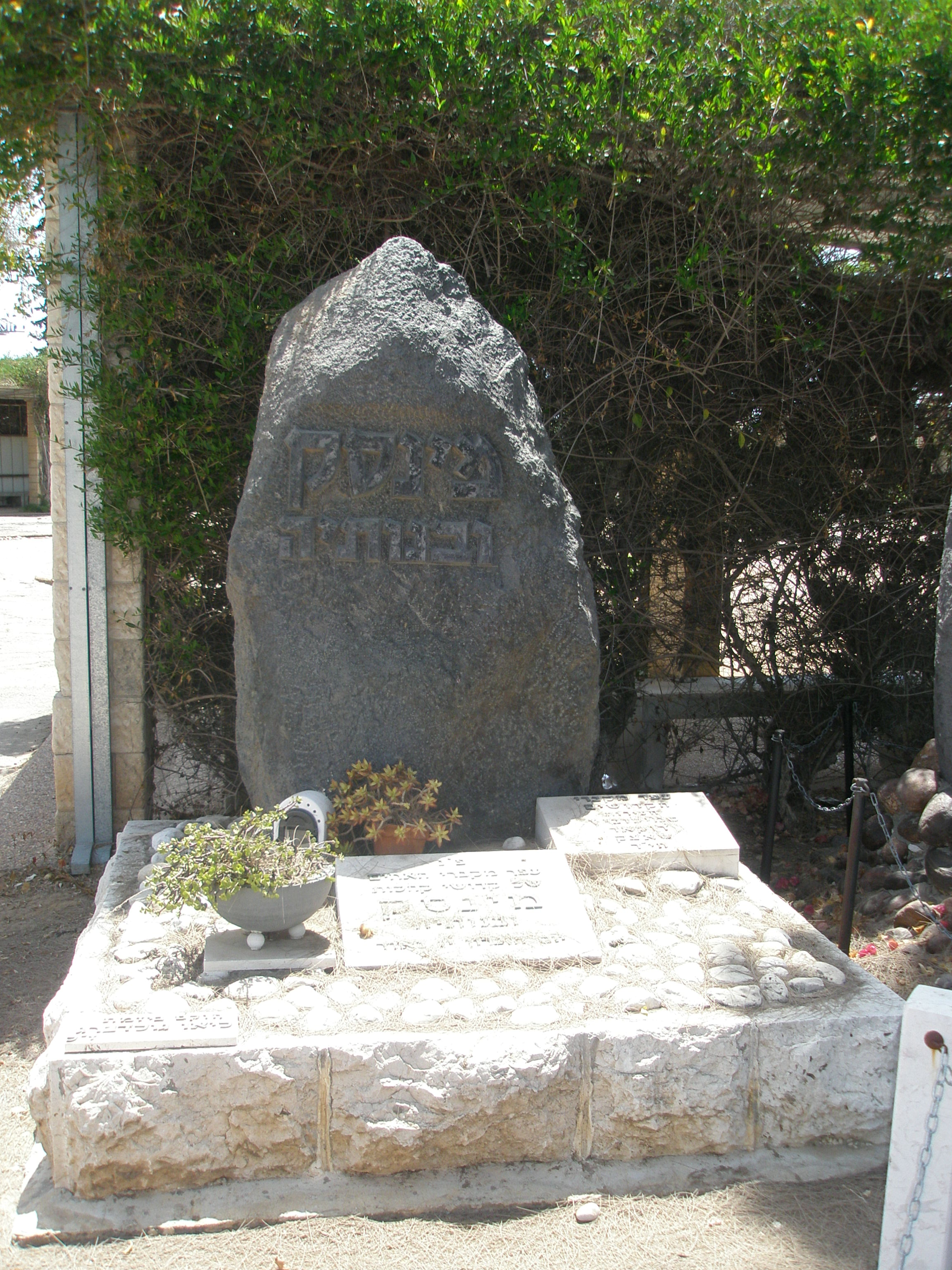
Minsk Holocaust memorial

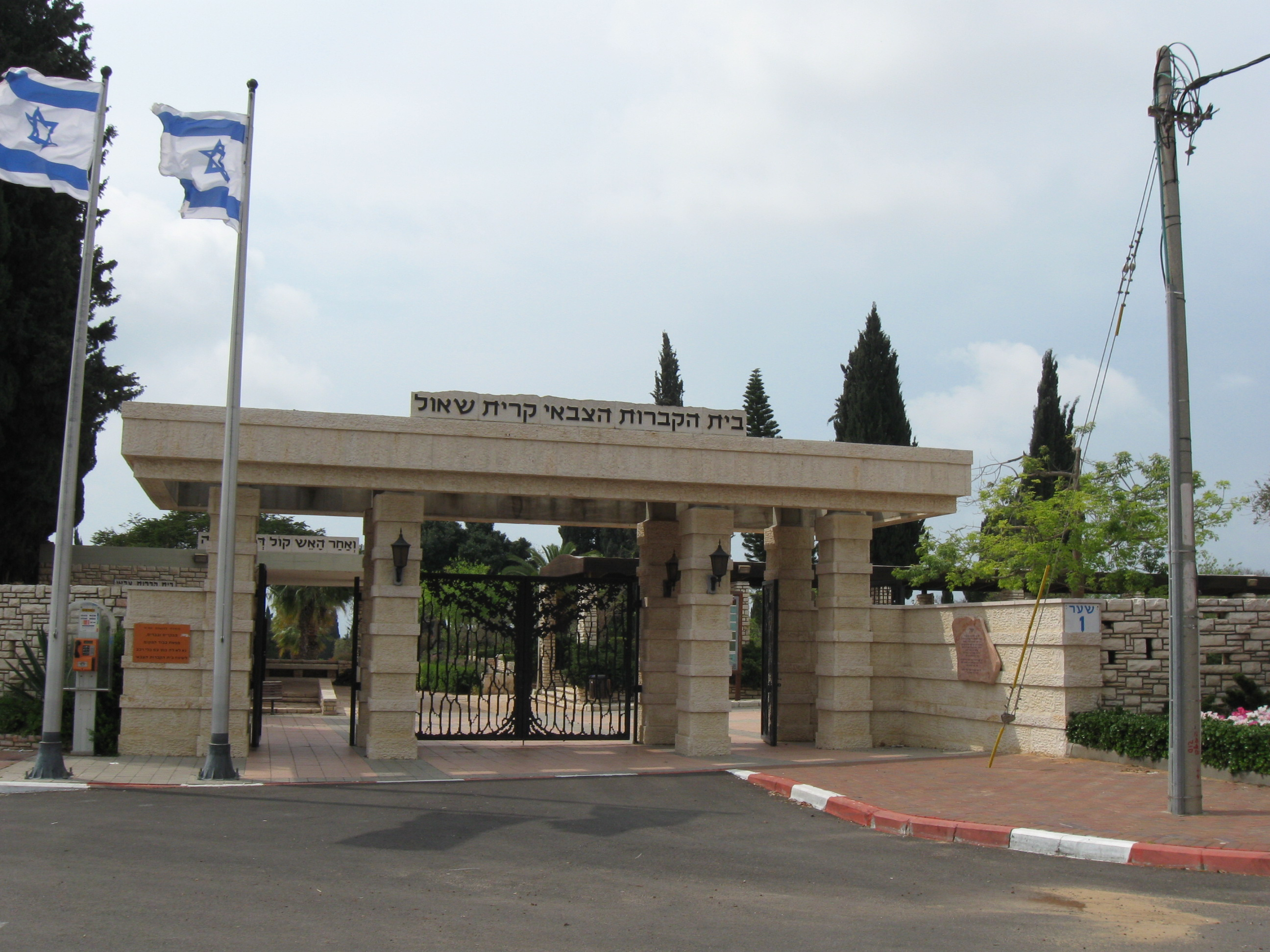
Entrance to the military cemetery

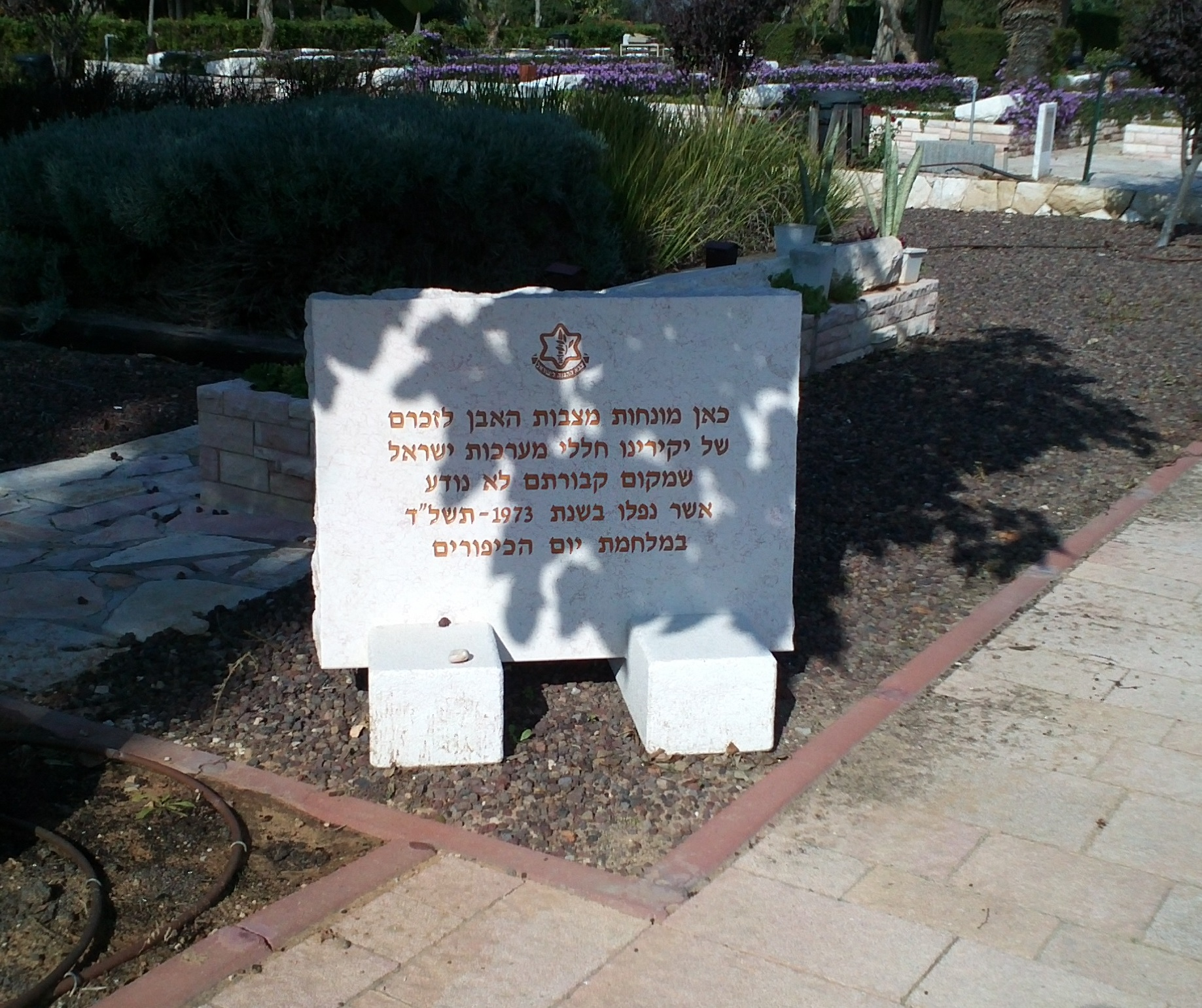
Yom Kippur War MIA memorial

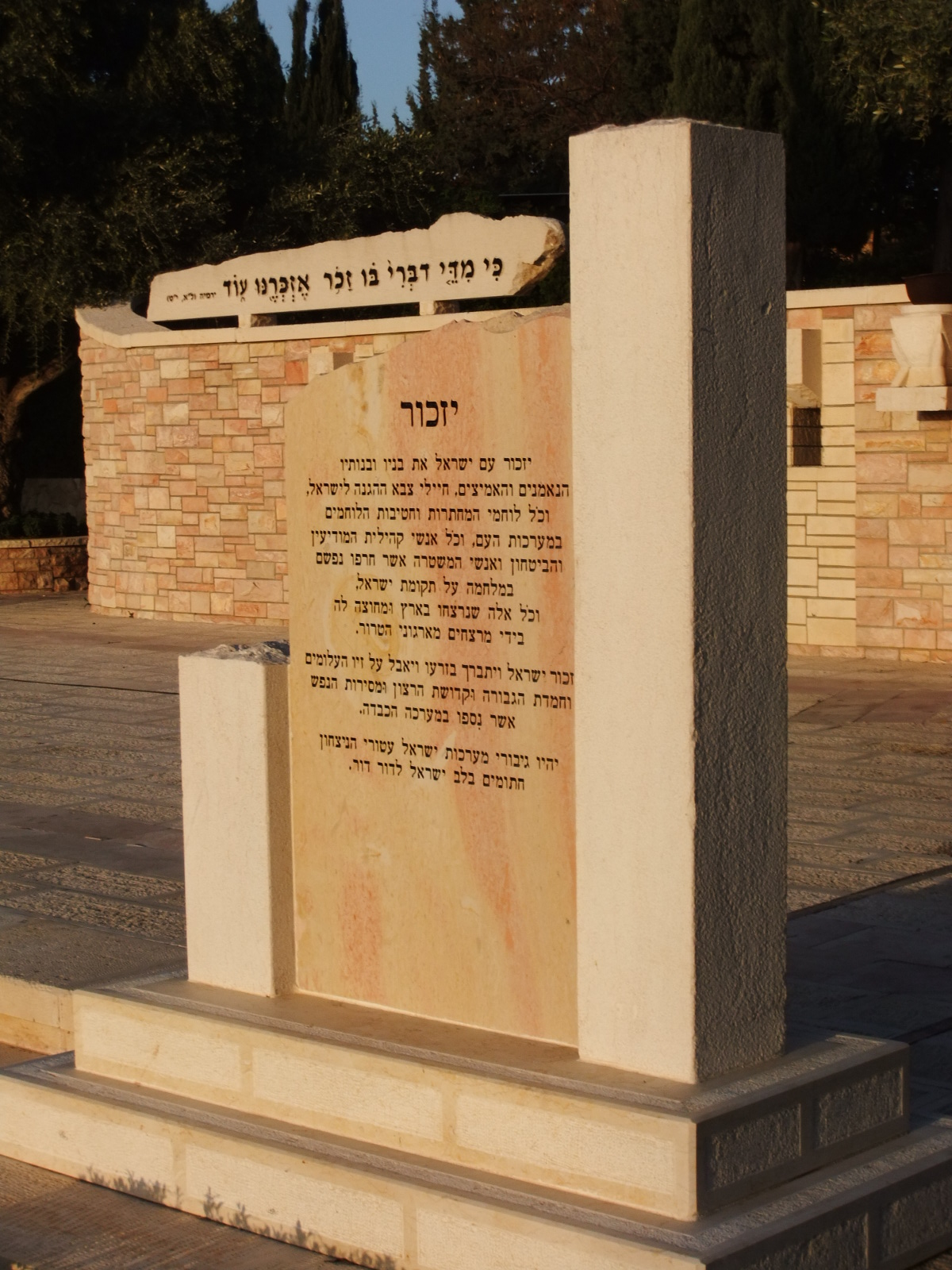
Military cemetery

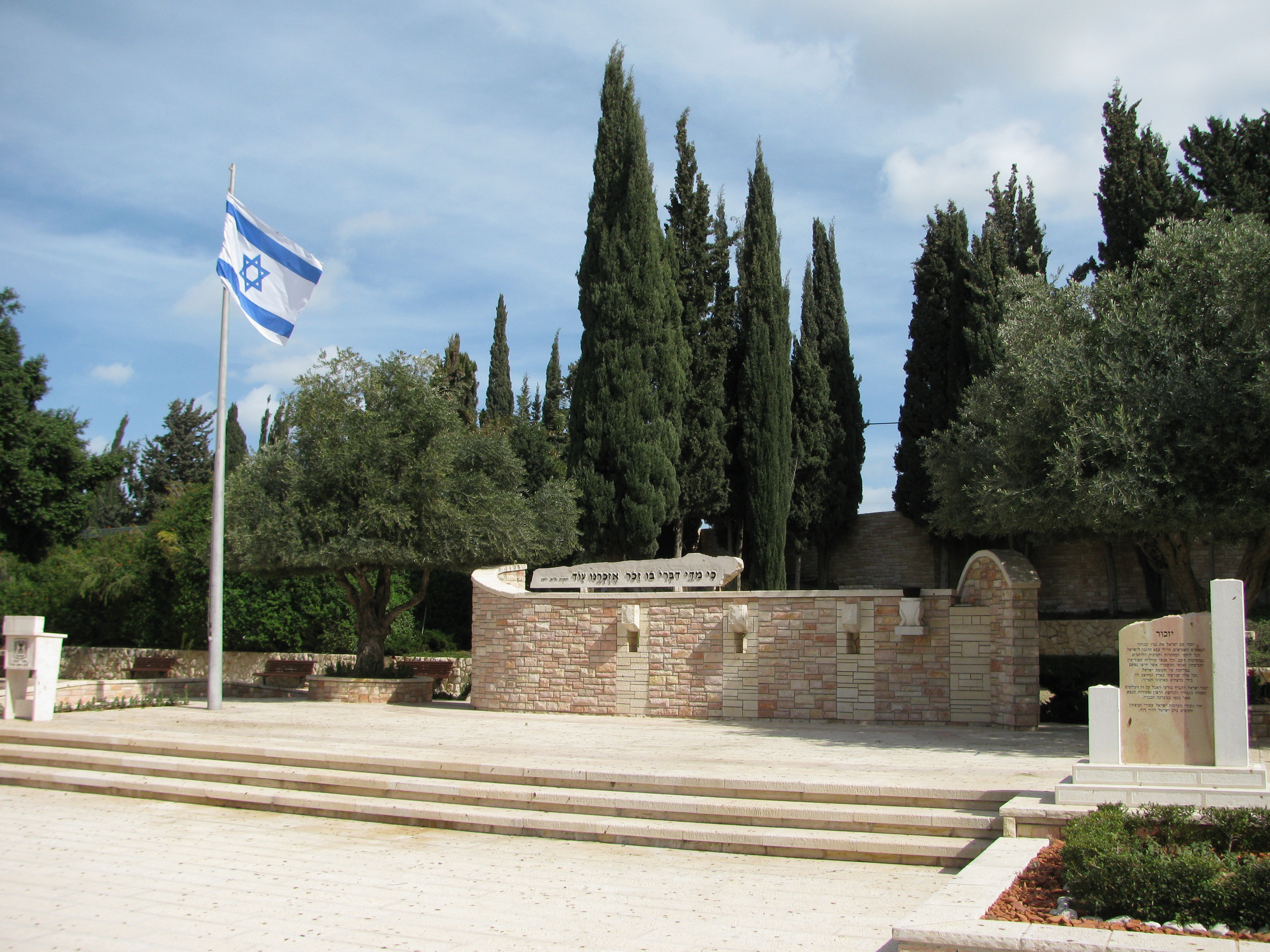
Military cemetery

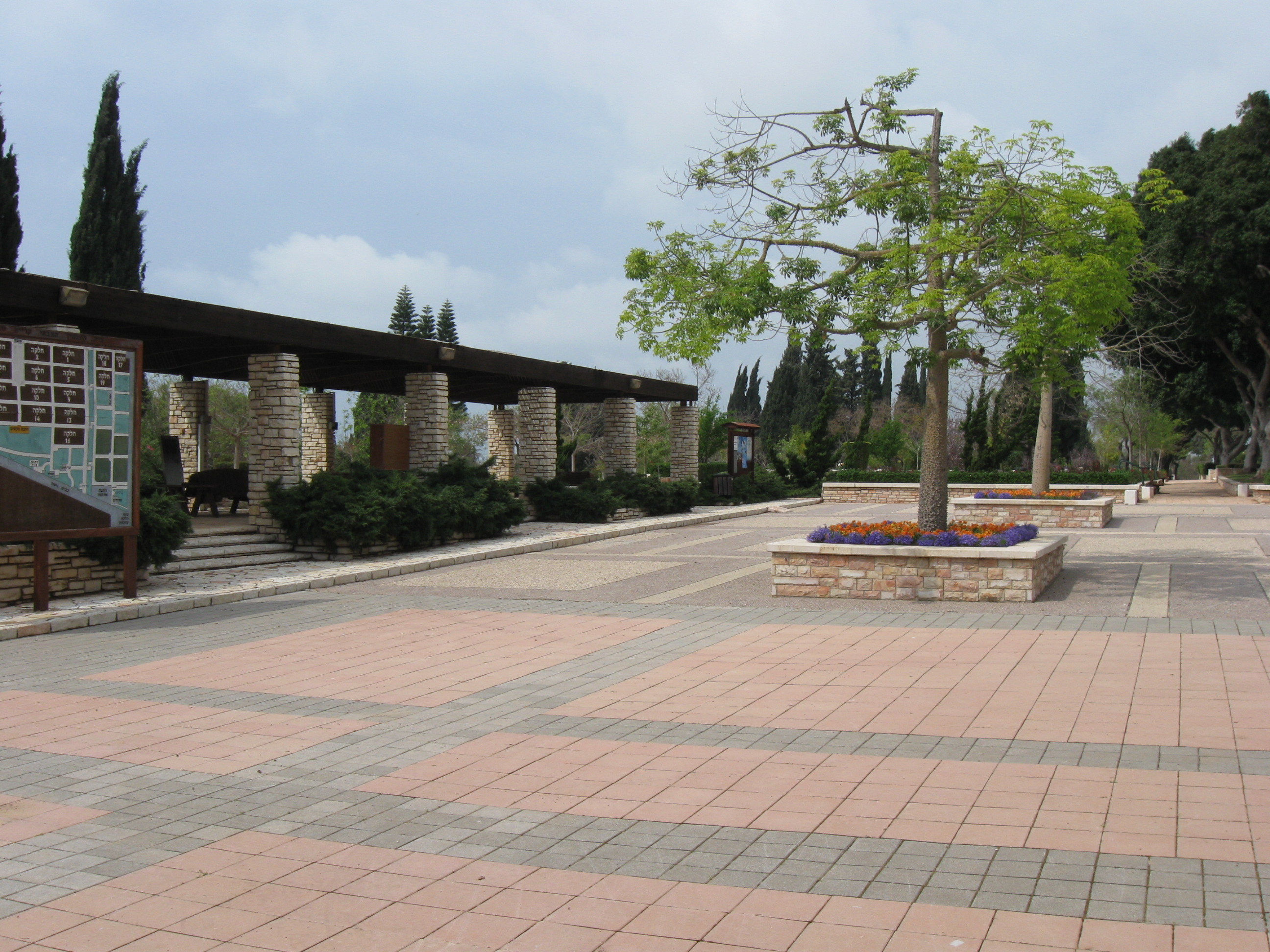
Military cemetery

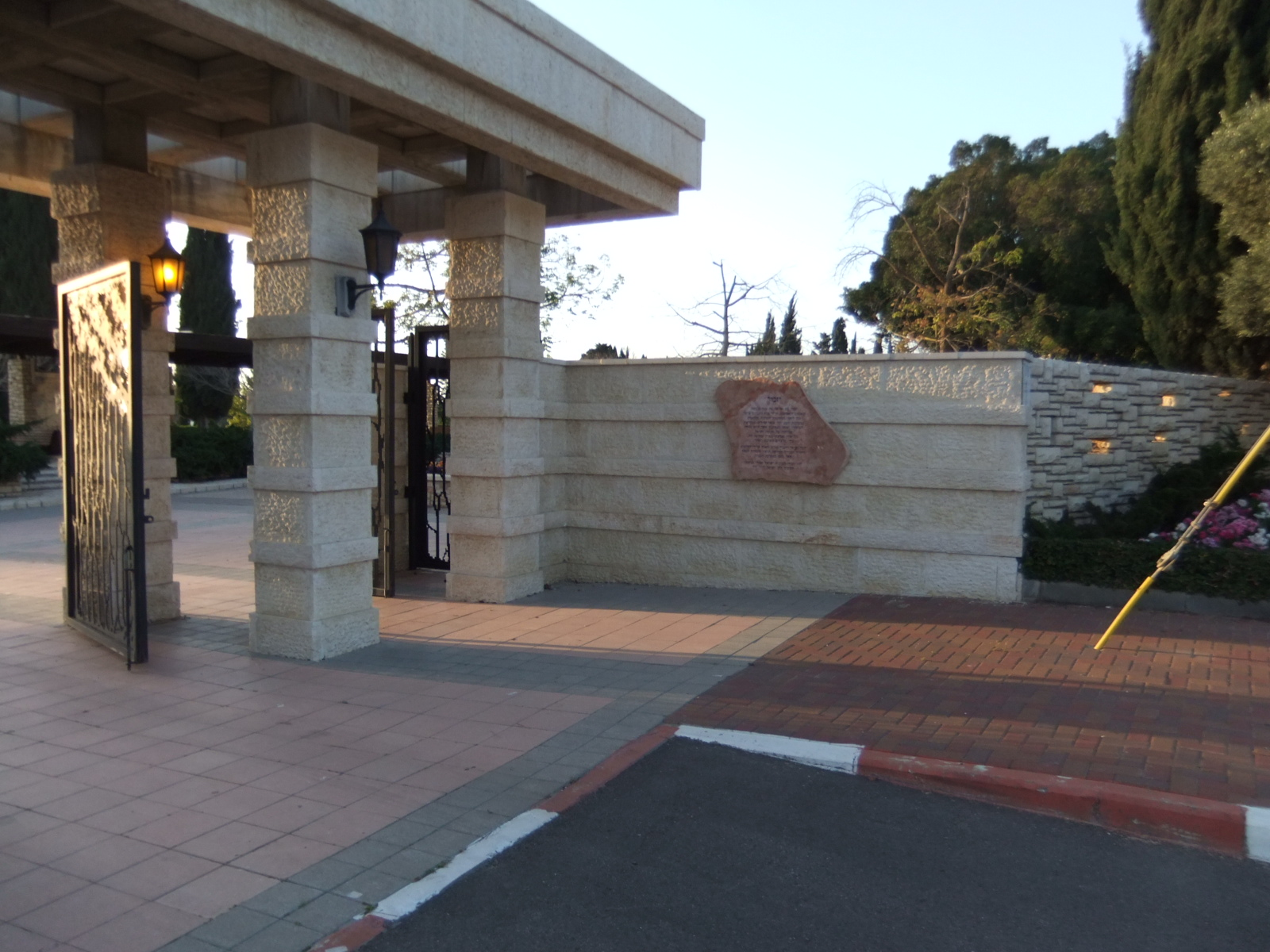
Military cemetery

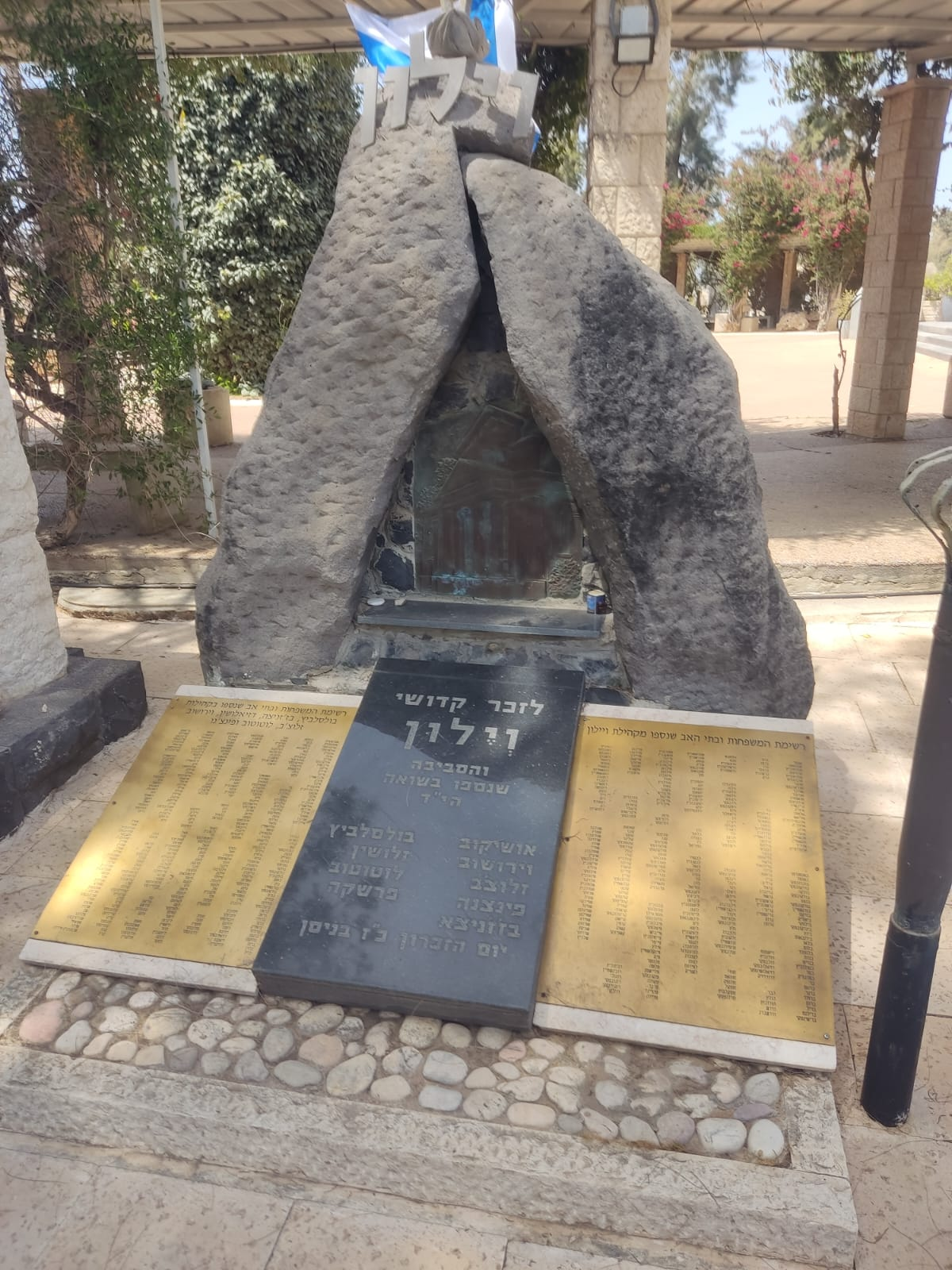
Wieluń and other communities in the area Holocaust memorial
