= Yevarechecha =

Israeli Hasidic nigun in Hebrew

Song by Ilana Rovina

from the album Chasidic Song Festival 1970
- Language: Hebrew
- Released: 1970
- Venue: Chasidic Song Festival at the Fredric R. Mann Auditorium, Tel Aviv (Note: The festival originally used the English translation of Chasidic during 1970.)
- Genre: Folk
- Length: 2:56
- Label: Hed Arzi Music
- Composer: David Weinkranz (Note: Alternatively, וינקרנץ is Romanized as Vainkrants.)
- Lyricist: Psalmist(s) of Psalms 128

Chasidic Song Festival 1970 track listing
- 12 tracks (Note: The album was performed and recorded live with a different track arrangement.) Disc A-side: 1. "Yevarechecha"; 2. "Sisu Et Yerushalaim"; 3. "Yedid Nefesh"; 4. "Al Shlosha Devarim"; 5. "Nichsefa"; 6. "Hine Ma Tov"; Disc B-side: 1. "Yibane Hamikdash"; 2. "Shema Israel"; 3. "Titgadal"; 4. "Veleyerushalaim Ircha"; 5. "Sim Shalom"; 6. "Ki Mezion"

"Yevarechecha" (Hebrew: יְבָרֶכְךָ, romanized: Yəḇāreḵəḵā; lit. 'You Will be Blessed' or 'You Shall be Blessed'), also transliterated as "Yevarekhekha", is a Hasidic Jewish nigun composed by David Weinkranz and performed by Ilana Rovina for the album Chasidic Song Festival 1970. The song is considered to be a classic from all of the festival's history.

== Lyrics ==
The lyrics of "Yevarechecha" comes from Psalms 128:5–6. Unlike the Masoretic Text of the psalm, the song has the phrase "all days of your life" (כל ימי חייך) as a standalone line, following a repetition of the first line up until "from Zion" (מציון). The new line also repeats "days of" (ימי) consecutively (כל ימי-ימי חייך). The lyrics use the title Hashem (ה׳) in place of the Tetragrammaton, which is commonplace in Orthodox Judaism.

Transliteration	Hebrew text	English translation (literal)
Yevarekhekha Hashem miTzion	יְבָרֶכְךָ ה׳ מִצִּיּוֹן	Hashem will bless you from Zion
Ur'eh betuv Yerushalayim	וּרְאֵה בְּטוּב יְרוּשָׁלַיִם	And see Jerusalem with goodness
Yevarekhekha Hashem miTzion	יְבָרֶכְךָ ה׳ מִצִּיּוֹן	Hashem will bless you from Zion
Kol yemey-yemey chayeykha	כָּל יְמֵי-יְמֵי חַיֶּיךָ	All days of [days of] your life
Ur'eh vanim levaneykha	וּרְאֵה בָנִים לְבָנֶיךָ	And see children to your children
Shalom al-Yisra'el	שָׁלוֹם עַל-יִשְׂרָאֵל	Peace unto Israel
	(repeat last two lines three times)
	(entire song repeated twice)

The word "חייך" (chayeykha, "your life") can alternatively be transliterated to chayyeykha, as the first Yod is geminated, however it is not typically pronounced as such in Modern Hebrew.

== See also ==
- Jewish music
- Music of Israel
- Psalm 128
