= Gershon Knispel =

German-born Israeli sculptor

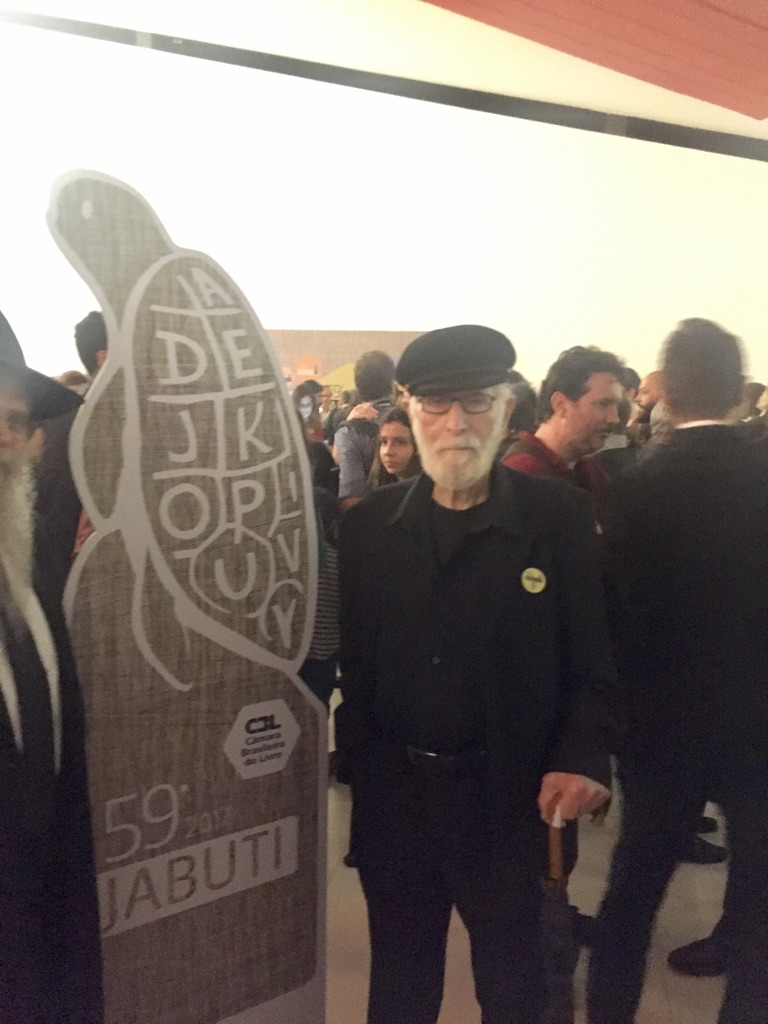
- Born: 11 September 1932; Cologne, Weimar Republic
- Died: 7 September 2018 (aged 85); Haifa, Israel
- Known for: Artist

Gershon Knispel (Hebrew: גרשון קניספל; 11 September 1932 – 7 September 2018) was a German-born Israeli sculptor who worked in Israel and Brazil and was one of the leading Israeli artists in the second half of the 20th century. Throughout his sixty-year career, he won prizes at the international biennales in Berlin, Moscow, and São Paulo.

== Biography ==
Gershon Knispel was born on September 11, 1932, in Cologne, Germany, to Chaim and Aliza Knispel. In 1935, due to the rise of the Nazis to power, he immigrated with his family to Israel. He studied art in the early 1950s and then illustrated lithographs and engravings for poetry books. He created illustrations and prints for Alexander Penn and Bertolt Brecht. He was a member of the Communist Party in Israel and Brazil and was active in political circles.

As a prominent representative of the "social realism " trend in Israeli art, Knispel turned to painting the living conditions of Holocaust survivors.

In 1959 he moved to Brazil after winning a competition to design a facade for a television tower in São Paulo. He stayed in Brazil for several years in artistic collaboration and close friendship with the architect Oscar Niemeyer. In 1964, a military coup broke out in Brazil, and Knispel, who was a member of the Communist Party, became wanted by the new regime. He fled his home and arrived at the Israeli Embassy in Rio de Janeiro in the trunk of a car. He left behind dozens of works of art on the facades of public buildings, outdoor sculptures, and murals in public halls in the various cities of Brazil, which he created during his years there. In Brazil, he also turned to a monumental work that is fundamentally the Holocaust - mainly, but not only, of the Jewish people. He and Palestinian artist Abed Abdi created a sculpture commemorating the events of Land Day.

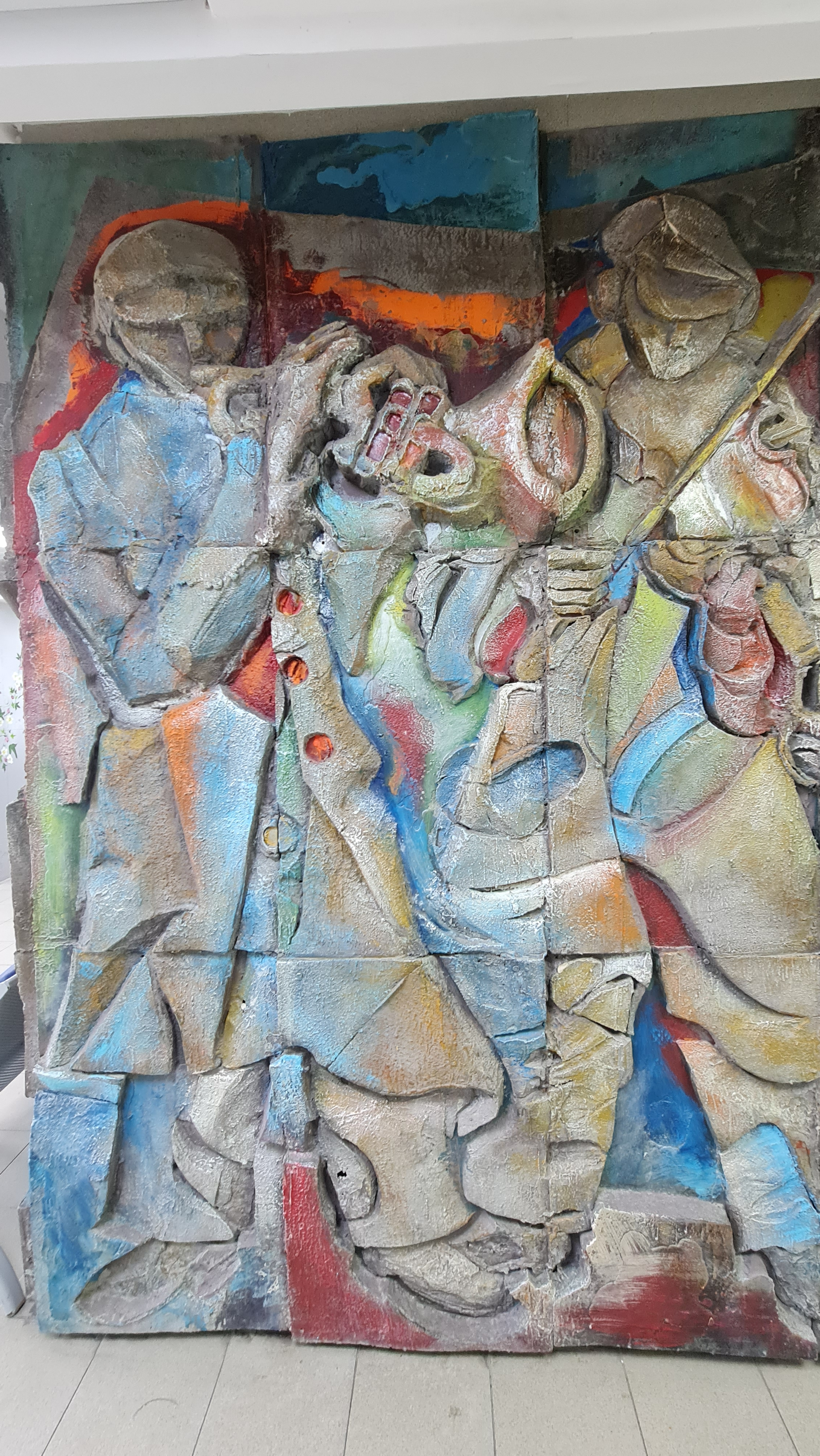
An artwork by Knispel

Knispel returned to Israel and lived in Haifa, where he served as an artistic consultant to the municipality in the years 1964–1989. In those years, many of his works were placed in the public space of Haifa.

In 1995, after the fall of the military dictatorship, Knispel returned to Brazil and divided his life between Haifa and São Paulo.

In 2018 his large-scale work "Signing the Peace Petition in Acre" (1953) entered the Tel Aviv Museum of Art collection. The Brazilian secret police confiscated this work during the dictatorship. When it was returned to him after decades, Knispel carried out a massive restoration, and as of 2018, it is placed in the permanent display of Israeli art at the Tel Aviv Museum of Art.

Knispel Died in Haifa on September 7, 2018.

== Awards ==
- 1957 - Gold Medal, International Youth Biennale, Moscow, USSR
- 1963 - São Paulo Biennial Award, São Paulo, Brazil
- 1966 - Ministry of Culture Award
- 1976 - First prize, competition for decorating the sports hall, Haifa
- 1978 - First prize, international competition, Havana, Cuba
- 1980 - Engraving Award, Biennale, Berlin, Germany
- 1983 - First prize, competition for the design of the "Defeat of the 3rd Reich" monument, Haifa
- 1988 - First prize for the 70th celebrations, the General Organization of Workers in the Land of Israel
- 1991 - Gutman Prize for illustration
