= Ilana Rovina =

Israeli singer (1934–2020)

- אילנה רובינא
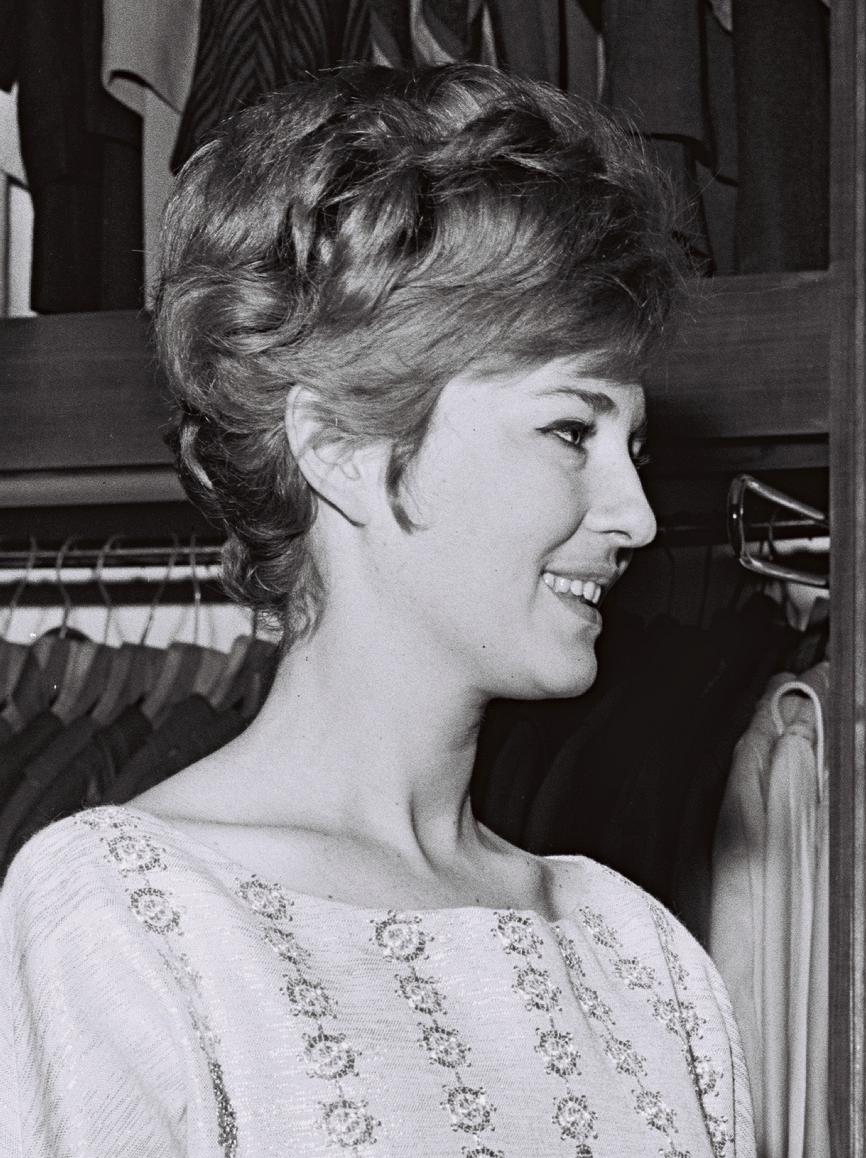
- Ilana Rovina, from a 1963 photograph.
- Born: 10 February 1934; Tel Aviv, Mandatory Palestine
- Died: 18 October 2020 (aged 86); Tel Aviv, Israel
- Occupation: Singer
- Spouse(s): Bill Stewart (m. 1956, divorced) Uri Zohar (divorced) Gurion Weissman (m. 1967; died 1974) Rafi Weiser (died in 2007)
- Children: 1
- Parent(s): Hanna Rovina; Alexander Penn

Ilana Rovina (Hebrew: אילנה רובינא; 10 February 1934 – 18 October 2020) was an Israeli singer.

== Biography ==
Ilana Rovina was the daughter of Russian-born actress Hanna Rovina and Russian-born poet Alexander Penn, the child of an extramarital affair that caused a public scandal. Her parents never married, not even after the end of her father's first marriage. She was raised by foster parents in her early years. Songwriter Zrubavela Sasonkin (1929 - 2004) was her older paternal half-sister. She had two other paternal half-siblings, Adam (1931 - 1933), born to her father and his first wife Bella Don and brother to Zrubavela, and Sinilga, born to her father and his second wife Rachel Luftglass. She attended Tichon Hadash high school in Tel Aviv.

Rovina married several times. Her first husband was American Bill Stewart; they married in 1956 but soon divorced. She married fellow entertainer Uri Zohar; they also divorced. Her third husband was businessman Gurion Weissman; they married in 1967, lived in France, and had a daughter, Maya. Weissman died in 1974. She lived in London with her fourth husband, Rafi Weiser; he died by suicide in 2007. Rovina had bone cancer when she died on 18 October 2020, from complications of COVID-19, in Tel Aviv, at age 86.

== Music and acting career ==
Rovina completed her army service in the 1950s, then studied music and modeled in Milan. She found independent fame with a series of pop hits in the 1960s and 1970s, including "The Road Song", "The Pepper Song", "Irises", "Yevarechecha", "Lilach Wants to Pick the Moon", "Go With Her", and "King Solomon's Mariners". She acted in the film I Like Mike (1961). During the Yom Kippur War, she entertained Israeli troops with other musicians, including Leonard Cohen, Oshik Levi, and Matti Caspi.

== See also ==
- Music of Israel
