= Alexander Penn =

Israeli poet (1906–1972)

- אלכסנדר פן; Александр Пэнн
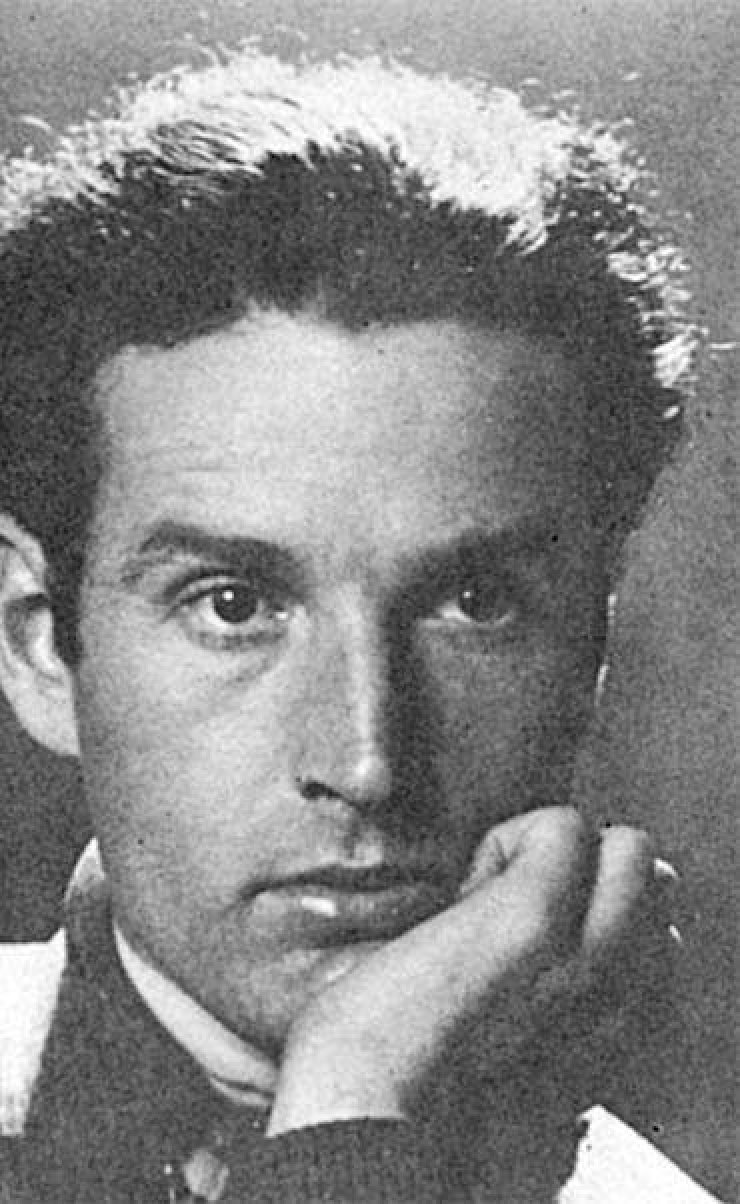
- Born: Avraham Pepliker-Stern; 14 February 1906; Yakymivka, Melitopolsky Uyezd, Taurida Governorate, Russian Empire
- Died: 19 April 1972 (aged 66); Tel Aviv, Israel
- Citizenship: Israeli
- Occupation: Poet
- Spouses: Bella Don (m. 1928; div. 1934): Rachel Luftglass
- Partner: Hanna Rovina
- Children: 4 (including Ilana Rovina)

Alexander Penn (Hebrew: אלכסנדר פן, Russian: Александр Пэнн; 14 February 1906 – 19 April 1972) was an Israeli poet.

== Biography ==
Avraham (Alexander) Pepliker-Stern (later Penn) was born in Yakymivka, Russian Empire, present-day Ukraine. According to one version of his biography, his father, Yosef Stern, ran a heder (a Jewish religious school for young boys) and taught Hebrew. As a youth, Penn was a boxer. He moved to Moscow in 1920, to study cinema, and published his first poems in Russian that year. In 1927, he immigrated to Mandatory Palestine. He worked as a boxing trainer in Tel Aviv, as well as a farm hand, a construction worker and a guard. In Russia, Yosef Stern had changed the family name to Pepliker to avoid military service. Penn's created a nom de plume by taking the "peh" from Pepliker and the final "nun" from Stern. While he was married to Bella Don (1910 - 1991), with whom he had married in 1928, he had a romantic relationship with actress Hanna Rovina, with whom he had a daughter, Ilana (1934 - 2020). At this time, Penn already had two children with his wife- a daughter, Zerubavela (also rendered as Zrubavela) (1929 - 2004) and a son, Adam (1931 - 1933). He later married Rachel Luftglass (1912 - 1979), with whom he had another daughter, Sinilga Eisenschreiber Penn.

From 1940 until his death in 1972, Penn lived in a small apartment in the northern section of Dizengoff Street, near the local police station. He was a charismatic, handsome man who sported long sideburns and black boots when others wore shorts and sandals.

== Literary career ==
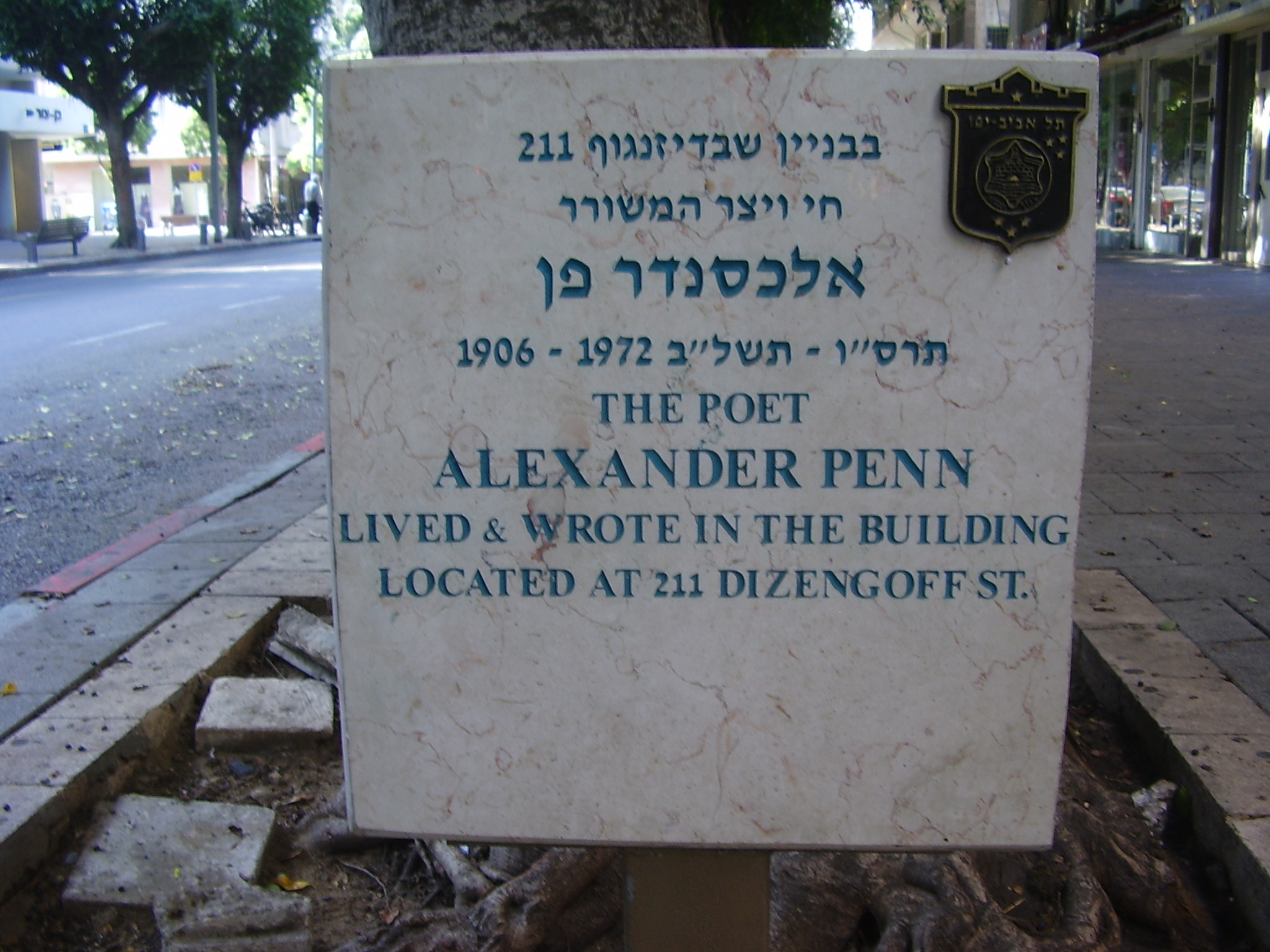
Alexander Penn historic plaque in Tel Aviv

Penn began writing Hebrew poetry after settling in Palestine. He published these poems in the daily Hebrew newspaper Davar and a variety of literary magazines. As a Marxist and a member of the Israeli Communist Party, he edited the literary section of the party's paper Kol Ha'am.

In 1957, his collection of poems Along the Way was published with illustrations by Gershon Knispel. Penn insisted on including poems with Jewish and Zionist content despite his affiliation with the Communist party, which criticized him for this deviance from the party line. In 1958, Aharon Amir, editor of the literary quarterly Keshet, published a number of his poems. Although he was ostracized for his political beliefs, leading literary figures continued to meet with him and admired his work, among them Avot Yeshurun.

One of Penn's most well-known poems was "Vidui" (My Confession), a turbulent piece about love and death. The poem was set to music in the early 1970s and has been recorded since then by numerous Israeli singers and musicians, including Michal Tal, Yehudit Ravitz and more recently, Marina Maximilian Blumin.

In an article about him in Haaretz newspaper, Dalia Karpel wrote that Penn, a contemporary of Israeli poets Avraham Shlonsky and Natan Alterman, wrote romantic love poems, conformist and non-conformist patriotic poems, political poems and lyrics that were set to music. Apart from his literary works, he was famous for his Bohemian lifestyle. A heavy smoker and drinker, who also suffered from diabetes, he saw himself as someone who could overcome the weaknesses of the body in defiance of medical science.

In 1989, a biography of Penn, "Shalekhet Kokhavim" (Shedding of the Stars: Alexander Penn. His Life and Work Until 1940), appeared in Hebrew.

== Published works ==
- World in Siege (poetry), Sefarim Tovim, 1948 [Tevel Be-Matzor]
- Along the Way (poetry), Mada Ve-Haim, 1956 [Le-Orech Ha-Derech]
- All and Everyone (play), Sheinfeld, 1952 [Kulam Ke-Ehad]
- Was It Ever (poetry), Tcherikover, 1972 [Haia O Lo Haia]
- One-Way Sadness Street (poetry), Hakibbutz Hameuchad, 1977 [Rehov Ha-Etzev Ha-Had Sitri]
- Roofless Nights (poetry), Hakibbutz Hameuchad, 1985 [Leylot Bli Gag]

== See also ==
- Hebrew literature
