= Yehoyada Haim =

Israeli diplomat

Yehoyada Haim (Hebrew: יהוידע חיים; born 1941 in Iraq) is a retired Israeli diplomat and former ambassador to India and China, and non-resident ambassador to Mongolia.

He studied in the United States at Georgetown University, where he received a doctorate in Middle East and Asian studies in 1975. In 1983 he published the book Abandonment of Illusions: Zionist political attitudes toward Palestinian Arab nationalism, 1936-1939, which was based on his dissertation. During his career as a diplomat, Haim has served in London as a political counselor and directed the Ministry of Foreign Affairs' Middle East Department. He later served as ambassador to India from 1995 to 2000 and then as ambassador to China and Mongolia.
