= Zev Sufott =

Israeli diplomat

- זאב סופוט
- Born: 27 October 1927; Liverpool, U.K.
- Died: 18 April 2014 (aged 86); Tel Aviv, Israel
- Resting place: Kiryat Shaul Cemetery
- Education: Magdalen College, Oxford; Yale University; Georgetown University
- Occupation: Diplomat

Zev Sufott (Hebrew: זאב סופוט; 27 October 1927 – 18 April 2014) was an Israeli diplomat who served as Israel's first Ambassador to the People's Republic of China, beginning in 1992. Born and raised in the United Kingdom, he was also a former Israeli Ambassador to the Netherlands and the Deputy Director for Europe within the Ministry of Foreign Affairs.

== Early life ==
Sufott was born and raised in Liverpool, England. He graduated from Magdalen College, Oxford, where he pursued Oriental Studies. Sufott and his parents were firm believers in Zionism. He was wounded during the 1948 Arab–Israeli War shortly after the creation of Israel.

Sufott enrolled in the Chinese studies program at Yale University, where he learned Chinese more than forty years before becoming Ambassador to China. He was posted in Washington D.C. during the 1960s, where he enrolled in African studies courses at Howard University and received a doctorate in political science from Georgetown University.

== Career ==
Zev Sufott joined the Ministry of Foreign Affairs in 1950, beginning a diplomatic career that lasted more than forty years. He was posted to the Embassy of Israel in Washington, D.C., where he served as First Secretary and Counselor, and London as Consul General. He then served as the Israel Ambassador to the Netherlands, and afterwards as Deputy Director for Europe at the Foreign Ministry.

In 1990, Sufott was approached by the then Director General of the Foreign Ministry, Reuven Merhav, who informed him that Israel intended to open a liaison office of the Israel Academy of Sciences and Humanities in Beijing, the capital of China. It was the first step to the establishment of diplomatic relations between Israel and the People's Republic of China. Merhav appointed Sufott as Special Advisor at the liaison office in 1991. In 1992, the two countries established full diplomatic relations and Sufott was appointed as Israel's first Ambassador to China.

In 1997, Sufott published a book, A China Diary: Towards the Establishment of China-Israel Diplomatic Relations, detailing the history of China–Israel relations. He further reflected on fledgling relations between the nations in a 2000 article for Israel Affairs, writing, "In the four decades before diplomatic relations, and even after their establishment in 1992, China has never been a priority on Israel's foreign policy agenda… On the contrary, Israel's foreign policy vis-à-vis China has been influenced, and at times dictated, by policy priorities and interests in other regions."

== Death ==
Zev Sufott died from cancer in Tel Aviv on 18 April 2014, at the age of 86. He was buried in Kiryat Shaul Cemetery.
