= Tullo Morgagni =

Italian journalist (1881–1919)

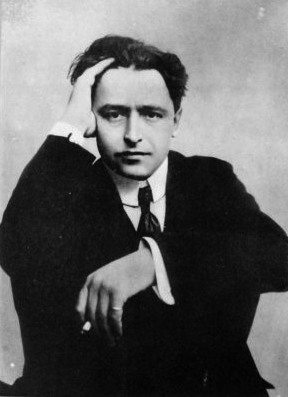
- Born: September 25, 1881; Forlì, Italy
- Died: August 2, 1919 (aged 37); Verona, Italy
- Cause of death: Airliner crash
- Occupations: Journalist and sports race director
- Years active: ca. 1900 – 1919

Tullo Morgagni (25 September 1881 in Forlì – 2 August 1919 in Verona) was an Italian journalist, sports race director, and aviation enthusiast. He was the founder of several Italian cycling races, notably the Giro d'Italia, Milan–San Remo, and Giro di Lombardia, and of sports-related publications.

== Biography ==
Tullo Morgagni was born in Forlì, Italy, on 25 September 1881 to Andrea Morgagni, an insurer, and Giuditta Monti, a primary school teacher. At the turn of the 20th century, at the age of 18, having moved to Milan with his family, he interrupted his high school studies and joined the newspaper L'Italia del Popolo (The Italy of the People), which voiced liberal and republican politics in northern Italy, as a news assistant.

Around the same time, Morgnani became passionate about aviation. In 1904 he made a flight aboard a balloon, and during the flight he met Eugenio Camillo Costamagna, director of La Gazzetta dello Sport (The Sports Gazette), a daily newspaper dedicated to the coverage of sports. Costamagna hired him, and it was the opportunity to work for a sports newspaper that Morgagni had been seeking. He quickly became editor-in-chief of La Gazzetta dello Sport at only 23 years of age.

In addition to his work in journalism, Morgnani also became an organizer of racing events. On his initiative, La Gazzetta dello Sport organized the first Italian motorcycling competition, the "1000 km a squadre" ("1,000 km (621-mile) Team") race. The race was held on 26 June 1904, starting from Rogoredo. Subsequently he launched the "Gran Fondo" (Big Ride), a 600-kilometre (373 mi) cycling race. The event was a huge success with the public. In 1905 Morgagni took the initiative in organizing the newly created race Milan–Milan, which was renamed Giro di Lombardia (Tour of Lombardy) in 1907. He also created the Milan–San Remo race in 1907 and the Giro d'Italia (Tour of Italy) in 1908. These three races have become the quintessential races of Italian cycling and some of the most iconic races in cycling history.

In January 1913, a new publisher, the Società Editoriale Italiana (SEI, Italian Publishing Society) of Pontremoli–Della Torre, took over La Gazzetta dello Sport. For the new publisher Morgagni founded Lo Sport Illustrato (Illustrated Sports), a periodical published every two weeks, printed on glossy paper with abundant photographs and a cover printed in color. The first issue came out on 15 April 1913, and Morgagni remained the periodical's director until his death. Formally a 32-page supplement to La Gazzetta dello Sport, Lo Sport Illustrato was published on the 10th and 25th of each month at the price of 50 centesimi. After Italy entered World War I in May 1915, Morgagni and his older brother Manlio, also a journalist, began to publish news from the front with photographs and maps of the areas of military operations in the biweekly, and during the remainder of 1915 and 1916 it had the temporary title Lo sport illustrato e la guerra (Illustrated Sport and War). In 1917 the biweekly's name changed again, to Il Secolo Illustrato (The Illustrated Century). During the war, Tullo and Manlio Morgnani, passionate about aviation, described the missions of aviators by representing them as sporting men with exceptional physical endurance. Morgagni also established an award for the best bombardier: It went to his fellow Italian Luigi Ridolfi, credited with 6,000 actions and recipient of the Gold Medal of Military Valor, Silver Medal of Military Valor, and War Merit Cross.

World War I ended in November 1918, and in the immediate post-war period Morgagni created the biweekly periodical Nel Cielo (In the Sky), a magazine entirely dedicated to aviation exploits, which was published as an insert in Il Secolo Illustrato, first appearing in the issue of 25 December 1918. Armando Cougnet, Vittorio Varale, and Edgardo Longoni collaborated on Nel Cielo, in which Morgagni attempted to raise awareness among the Italian authorities and civil society of what he viewed as the necessity of transforming military aviation into civil aviation.

On 2 August 1919, Morgagni boarded a Caproni Ca.48 airliner for a civilian flight from Milan to Venice and back with Ridolfi at the controls. The airliner made the flight to Venice in the morning without incident and spent the day there. During the return journey to Milan in the late afternoon, the plane crashed while passing over Verona, killing Morgnani and everyone else aboard in the first heavier-than-air airliner disaster in history.

== Commemoration ==
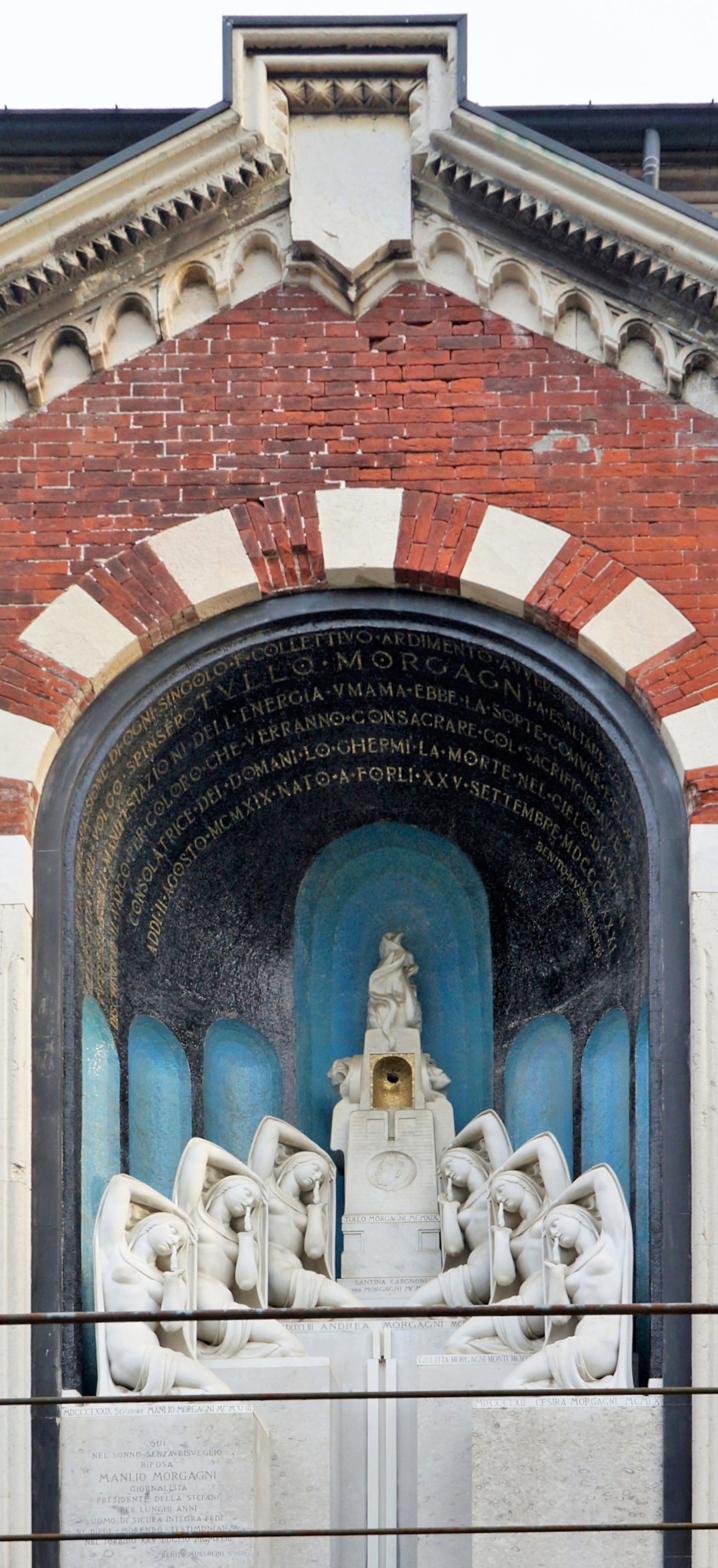
The funerary monument to the Morgagni brothers at the Cimitero Monumentale di Milano.

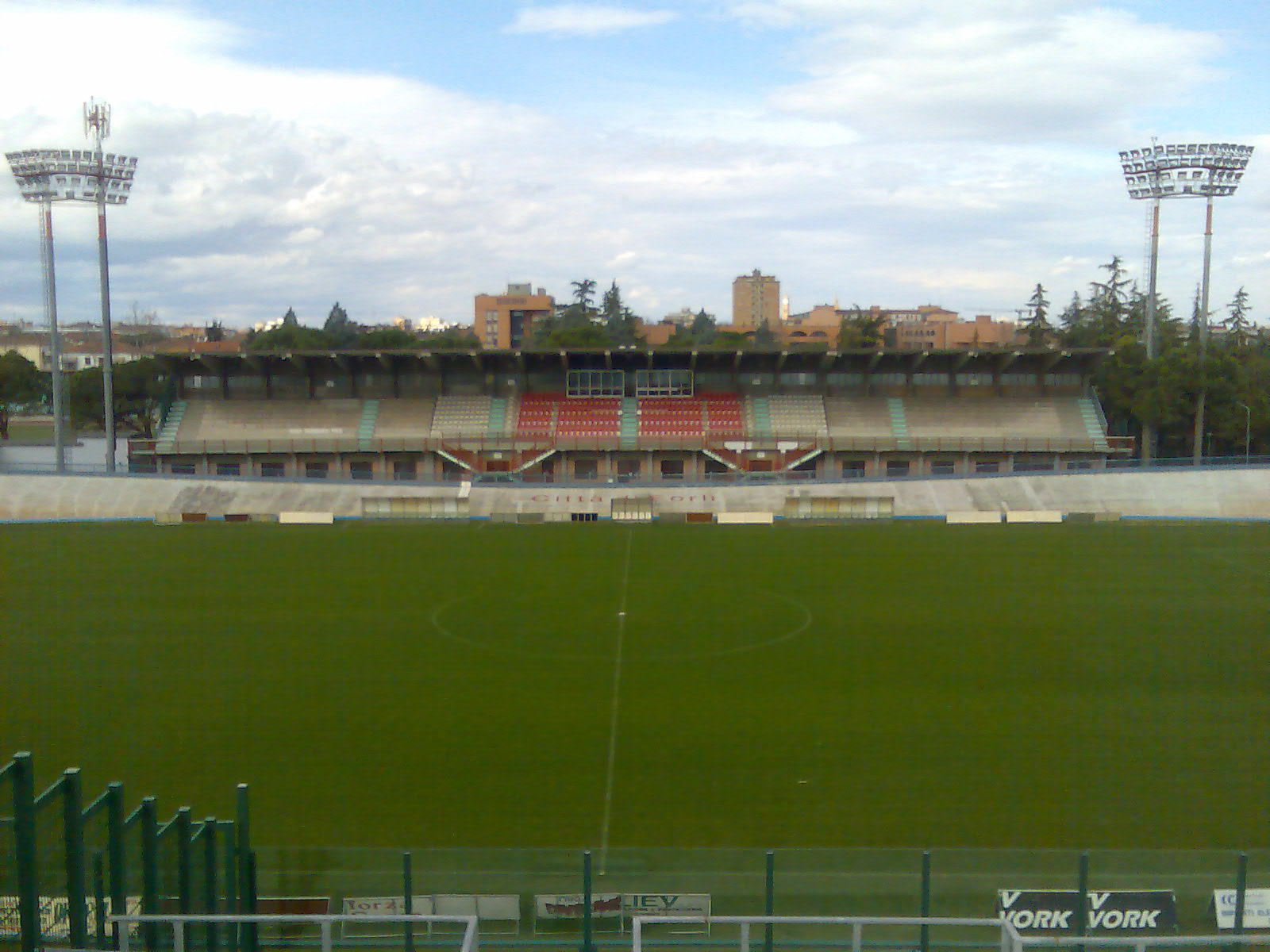
Stadio Tullo Morgagni

At the Cimitero Monumentale di Milano (Monumental Cemetery of Milan), an artistic funerary monument created by Enzo Bifoli is dedicated to Morgagni and his brother.

In 2009, the football stadium of Forlì was renamed Stadio Tullo Morgagni (Tullo Morgnani Stadium) in Morgagni's honor.

Since 2009, the Forlì-Valle del Bidente Lions Club, together with the Faculty of Sports Sciences of the University of Bologna, has organized the national Tullo Morgagni Award for degree theses on sport or sports communication.
