= Vincenzo Torriani =

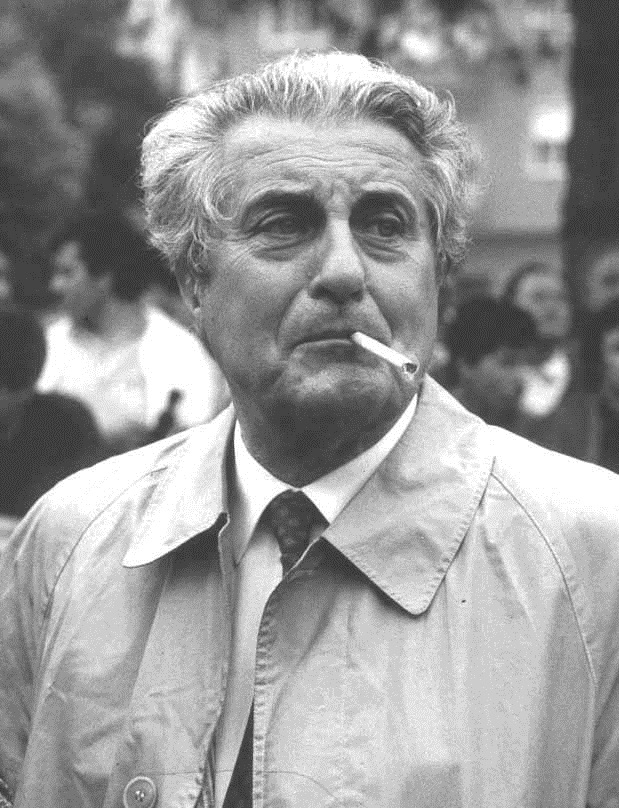
- Vincenzo Torriani
- Born: 17 September 1918; Novate Milanese, Italy
- Died: 24 April 1996 (aged 77); Milan, Italy
- Occupation: Sports executive
- Title: Director of the Giro d'Italia
- Term: 1949 – 1992
- Predecessor: Armando Cougnet
- Successor: Carmine Castellano

Vincenzo Torriani (Novate Milanese, 17 September 1918 – Milan, 24 April 1996) was an Italian sports executive and director of the Giro d'Italia road cycling race from 1949 to 1992.

== Life ==
He was born to a family who ran an olive oil plant. After World War II, he chose to begin organizing events rather than join the family olive oil company. He started with Azione Cattolica, a religious organization and expanded from there and soon organized sporting events. Through his sports organizing, he crossed paths with La Gazzetta dello Sport's Armando Cougnet and became involved with the Giro d'Italia starting in 1946. he assumed the role of sole director before the start of the 1949 Giro d'Italia. In 1989, Torriani left day-to-day control of the Giro to Carmine Castellano, who then took full control after he fully left the race following the 1991 edition. He died on 24 April 1996.
