= Novate =

Novate may refer to several places in Lombardy, Italy:

- Novate Brianza, a civil parish of Merate, in the Province of Lecco
- Novate Mezzola, a municipality in the Province of Sondrio
- Novate Milanese, a municipality in the Province of Milan
