= Gabriel Talphir =

Gabriel Talphir גבריאל טלפיר
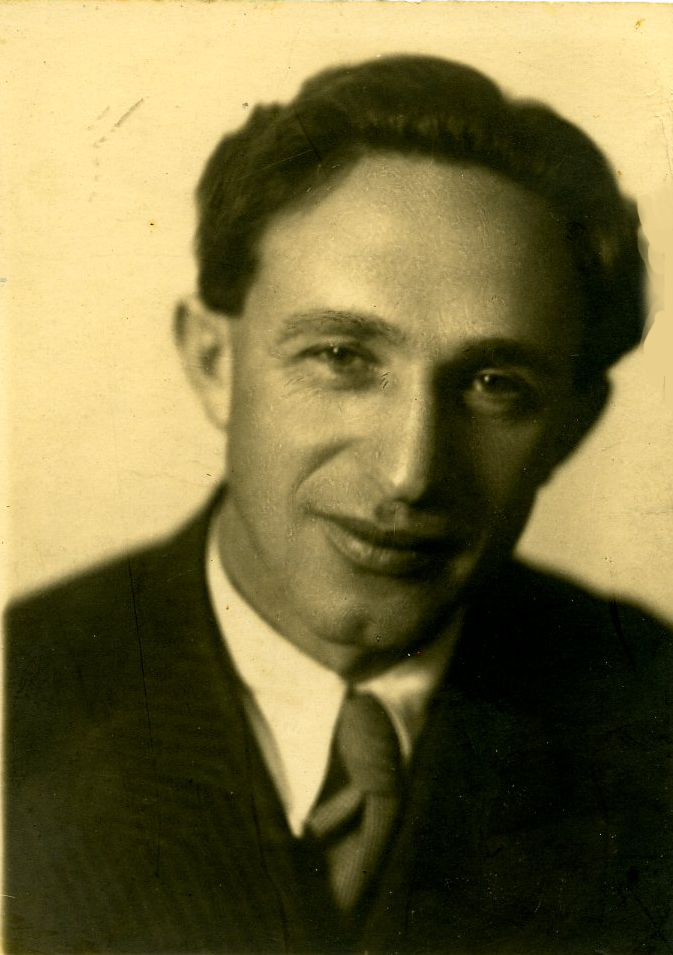
- Gabriel Talphir, 1933
- Born: 1901; Stanislaw, Galicia, Ukraine
- Education: University of Vienna
- Known for: Artist, poet, publisher, translator
- Movement: Israeli art

Gabriel (Joseph) Talphir (Hebrew: גבריאל טלפיר; 1901–1990) was an Israeli poet, art critic, publisher, editor and translator.

== Biography ==
Gabriel Talphir was born as Joseph Wundermann in Stanislaw, Galicia, then ruled by the Austro-Hungarian Empire. When World War I broke out, he was sent to study at a Jewish high school in Vienna. Later he studied at art at the University of Vienna and taught at several Jewish schools in Vilna, Zamość, Lwow, and Warsaw. He was a member of the Zionist youth group Hechalutz and immigrated to Palestine in 1925.

In 1924, Talphir published his first poems in Polish Jewish periodicals. Later, he included them in his collection of verse, Three Poems. His most well-known poems are Legion (1925), Jazz Band, a rhythmic poem (1927), Hunger (1928), and The Scattered Manifest (1928). Talphir also wrote and published art criticism. In 1932, he founded Gazith, a journal on arts and culture. For years, "Gazith" was the only Jewish periodical dedicated to the plastic arts. He edited the journal with the help of his wife Miriam.

Gazith published prose, poetry, essays, reviews and illustrations of art and architecture. Of the essays published during its first year, a third were dedicated to visual art. Most were about European Jewish artists, among them Liebermann, Menkes, Mintchine, Modigliani, Pascin, Pissarro, Frenkel and Soutine.

In 1937, he published a large format album, Contemporary Jewish Painters, which included the reproductions of 20 painters, most of whom originating from Eastern Europe, 14 Parisians among whom were Chagall, Soutine and Modigliani and 6 from Erez Israel among whom were Frenkel, Castel, Litvinovsky, Shemi and others.

On behalf of the 70-year anniversary of Gazith's establishment in Tel Aviv, the head of the municipality of Tel Aviv-Yafo, Shlomo Lahat, wrote to Talphir that he could not imagine the original artistic and cultural achievement of the city without Talphir's periodical and his dedicated work.

Talphir was also a translator. Among the many books he translated were the works of Ilya Ehrenburg, Ève Curie (the daughter of Madame Curie) translated with wife Miriam, and Franz Werfel. He also edited, published and translated art books and albums.

== Legacy ==
In 1991, on the first anniversary of his death, all his poems were re-released by Gazith. A collection of artist's portrait photographs and letters from Talphir's estate is found today at the Information Center for Israeli Art in the Israel Museum, Jerusalem.

== See also ==
- Visual arts in Israel
- Aliyah
