= Gazith =

Israeli art, culture and literature monthly journal

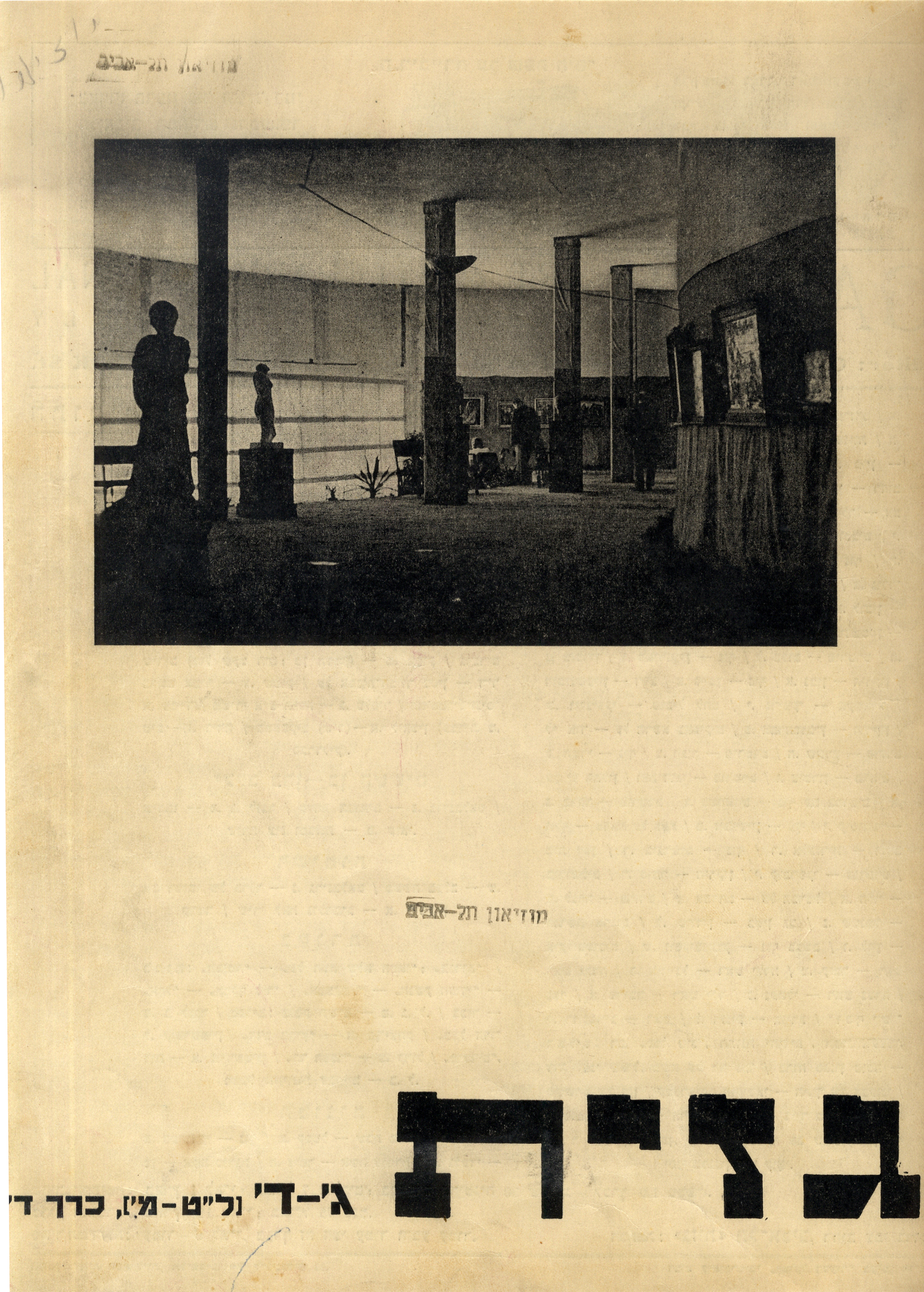
- Founder: Gabriel Talphir
- Founded: 1931
- Language: Hebrew
- City: Tel Aviv
- Country: Israel, the Yishuv
- Free online archives: https://www.nli.org.il/he/archives/NNL_ARCHIVE_AL990044072090205171/NLI https://www.archives.gov.il/product-page/1339696

Gazith was a monthly magazine for art and literature, which described itself as "a stage for artistic-literary creation and free thought". It was founded by Gabriel Talphir (Yosef Wunderman) in 1931. The monthly was published every month from 1932 to 1982 (except for a short period in the second half of the 1930s). For many years it was the only Hebrew magazine dedicated to the visual arts.

== History and content ==
Gazith magazine published articles on the history of art, theater, architecture, musical analysis of works, criticism of painting and sculpture from the Western World, Southeast Asia, India and Japan. It published short monographs of artists, especially of Israeli and Jewish artists, as well as stories, poetry and translations from Greco-Roman literature. The journal contained black and white images of visual arts, photographs of architectural buildings and theater sets.

Several notable Jewish and Israeli artists and authors published essays and short stories in Gazith. The artist Isaac Frenkel published an article "On French Art" in the 1930s when French Art highly influenced the local art scene. The writer, Yehoshua Bar-Yosef, published numerous short stories.

One of the initial trends of the journal was to confirm the place of art in Judaism and the justification of its practice in the Land of Israel ("Although before it [art] seemed to contradict the spirit of the nation... but now it has ceased to be an ideal alone, an ideal enjoyed by foreigners, those who sit in the tents of Yefet are not beyond the extent of the spread of its sheets, but within its contents.")

In honor of Gazit's jubilee and seventy years of Tel Aviv, Shlomo Lahat, mayor of Tel Aviv-Jaffa, wrote that he could not imagine the original artistic and cultural activity in the city without the magazine and its dedicated work.

== See also ==
- Gabriel Talphir
- Visual arts in Israel
