= Information Center for Israeli Art =

Research center in Jerusalem

Coordinates: 31°46′20.56″N 35°12′16.29″E

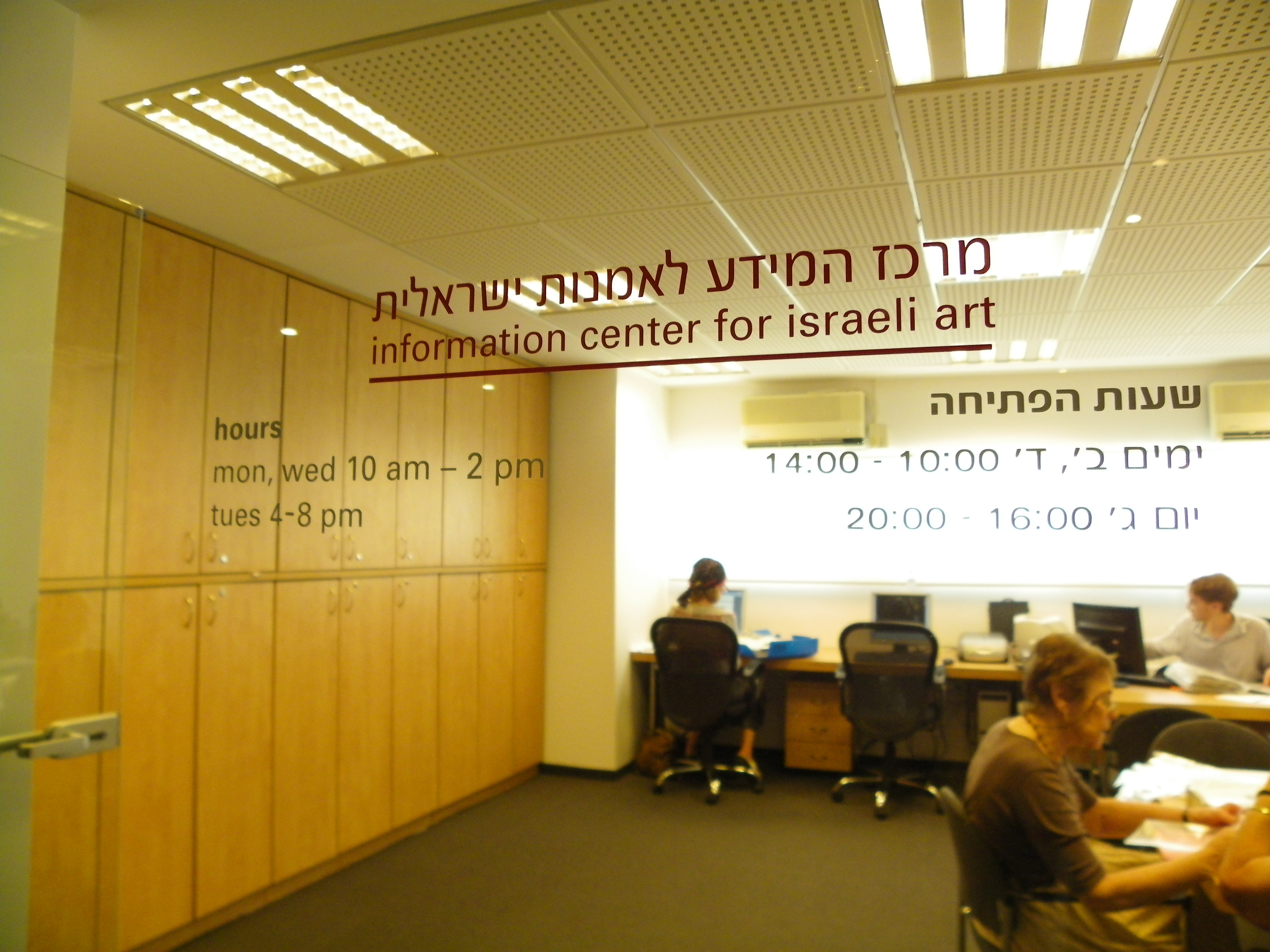
- The Information Center for Israeli Art, Israel Museum, Jerusalem
- Established: 1975
- Location: Main building of the Israel Museum, Jerusalem; Library Level
- Type: Archives
- Website: Information Center site

The Information Center for Israeli Art (ICIA) is the largest collection of primary resources documenting the history of Israeli art in Israel. Over 12,000 artists files are housed in the Center in the Israel Museum, Jerusalem.

== History ==
As a research center within the Israel Museum, the Information Center for Israeli Art houses materials related to a broad variety of Israeli visual art and artists. All regions of the country and numerous eras and art movements are represented. In addition to the papers of artists, the Center collects documentary material from art galleries, art dealers, and art collectors. It also houses a collection of over 700 Israeli art-related videos and publishes a selection of over 5,800 Israeli artist biographies online.

The Information Center reopened in June 2011, after extensive museum renovations. The Center offers its visitors a wealth of material collected since 1975, now easily accessible through the computerized information system. Center visitors from all around the world can enjoy services providing them with digital information by email.

The Information Center for Israeli Art documents and catalogs information about Israeli artists and their work from the very beginning of Israeli art till today. The center encompasses over 12,800 artists – painters, sculptors, photographers, graphic designers, industrial designers, ceramicists, silversmiths and more. The material in the Center is collected into artist files, for prominent and well-known artists as well as those who have not been widely exhibited. The database and artist files include biographical information, newspaper clippings and articles regarding art shows in Israel and abroad, invitations to exhibitions, films, slides, catalogs and photographs of artwork.

The Information Center for Israeli Art contains important and unique collections from many galleries and artists. One example of this is the Debel Gallery Archives. The Debel Gallery was established in 1973 in Jerusalem. Since January 2007 the Debel Gallery Archive is housed within the Information Center for Israeli Art at the Israel Museum, Jerusalem. It includes background material, exhibition histories, photos of invitations from 1973 to 1990, recordings of interviews with artists, correspondence with artists, and much more. An additional collection of rich visual material documenting Israeli art is the Israel Zafrir Photographer Archive, containing over 10,000 photographs of Israeli artwork and artists. The Gabriel Talphir Archive consists of letters and photographs sent by artists to the well known art critic and author. The Nahum Zolotov Archive, also found in the Center, contains sketches and notations from the renowned Israeli architect. The Frank E. van Raalte Film Archive contains over 100 films interviewing Israeli artists. The Bat Sheva and Yitzhak Katz Archive contains personal writings and letters of artists including Sionah Tagger, Israel Paldi and Arieh Lubin. The Artifact Gallery Archive contains exhibitions and artists files including Nahum Tevet, Philip Rantzer and Diti Almog. In addition, the Max (Mordechai) Farbmann and the Jakob Eisenscher Archives include photographs, letters and newspaper articles about these Israeli artists.

As of January 2010, new information received by the Information Center for Israeli Art is filed digitally. In 2011, the Center database has been enriched with over 25,000 newspaper articles, and the number of exhibitions documented in the Center surpassed 15,000. The Center website offers bilingual information on 5800 selected Israeli artists and includes a short biography, thousands of Israeli works of art from the Israel Museum collection and other art collections from around the world as well as a comprehensive list of exhibitions for each artist.

== See also ==
- Visual arts in Israel
- Israeli sculpture
- List of public art in Israel
