= René Gimpel =

French art dealer (1881–1945)

René Albert Gimpel (4 October 1881–3 January 1945) was a French art dealer of Alsatian Jewish descent who died in 1945 in Neuengamme concentration camp, near Hamburg, Germany.

== Art dealer and collector ==
Friend and patron of living artists and collectors, he was the son of a picture dealer and the brother-in-law of Sir Joseph Duveen. His witty and acerbic journal, kept for twenty-one years and published posthumously as Journal d'un collectionneur: marchand de tableaux (1963, revised edition 2011), with a preface by Jean Guéhenno of the Académie française, was translated and published in English as Diary of an Art Dealer (1966), and is a primary source for the history of modern art and of collecting between the World Wars.

Trained in the classic traditions of connoisseurship, a great admirer of Chardin and in general the works of the French eighteenth century, Gimpel had an instinctive sympathy for the modern contemporaries among whom he moved: Georges Braque, Mary Cassatt, Claude Monet, Pablo Picasso and above all, his intimate friend Marie Laurencin. In 1929, he discovered and started to support Abraham Mintchine in whom he recognized artistic genius. A friend of Marcel Proust, whom he met at Cabourg in 1907, he had a selective high regard for many museum professionals but a loathing of the experts who provided attributions and certificates of authenticity for paintings in the market.

In 1902 his father, Ernest Gimpel, opened E. Gimpel & Wildenstein in New York; the firm would continue in partnership until 1919. In 1905 Ernest and Nathan Wildenstein began negotiating to buy a selection of the magnificent Paris collection of Rodolphe Kann from Kann's estate; however, the powerful firm of Duveen Bros muscled in and bought out their interest, eventually acquiring the entire collection in 1906 for 21 million francs (or over $US4 million), including what were considered in those days twelve Rembrandts. While breaking up the Kann collection and selling it on was a protracted process for the Duveens, E. Gimpel & Wildenstein (Paris and New York) benefited. René Gimpel's repeated trips to the United States from 1902 resulted in significant sales to wealthy North American collectors, some of whom he skewered in his private diaries as showing off their artworks "like rich children showing off their toys". In May 1919, three weeks of concentrated trading on behalf of E. Gimpel & Wildenstein resulted in sales of five paintings, including Rembrandt's Portrait of Titus to Jules Bache (now Metropolitan Museum of Art, New York, as Man in a Red Cloak, style of Rembrandt), a tapestry Saint Veronica to Mrs Florence Blumenthal (Metropolitan Museum of Art, New York), and a Houdon portrait bust to C. Ledyard Blair, Armand-Thomas Hue, Marquis de Miromesnil (Frick Collection, New York) for $730,000.

== Nazi era persecution in France ==
Both Jewish and in the resistance, Gimpel was doubly persecuted by the French collaborators with the Nazis during World War II. His Paris apartment was seized in 1942, and his possessions, including 82 crates of works he had placed in storage, were looted. In 1944, the Gestapo seized contents of bank safe in Nice. Gimpel was interned by the Vichy authorities for his activities in the Resistance, released in 1942, but then re-arrested. In confinement he taught English to his fellow prisoners, in preparation, he said, for their coming liberation. He died in the Neuengamme concentration camp, near Hamburg, Germany.

== Legacy and restitution ==
In 2019, Gimpel's grandchildren accused the French culture ministry of blocking restitution of works from Gimpel's collection that were held by French state museums. In 2020, the decision was taken to restitute three paintings by André Derain to Gimpel's heirs.

== See also ==
- List of claims for restitution for Nazi-looted art
- The Holocaust
- Vichy France
