= Giovanni Testori =

Italian writer (1923–1993)

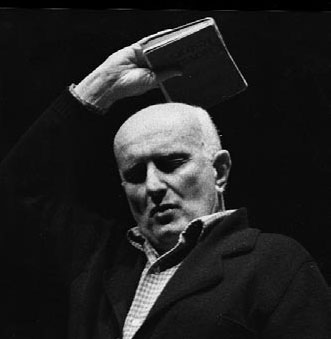
- Born: 12 May 1923; Novate Milanese, Italy
- Died: 16 March 1993 (aged 69); Milan, Italy
- Occupation: Playwright
- Writing career
- Genre: Drama
- Movement: Lombard line

Giovanni Testori (Novate Milanese, 12 May 1923 – Milan, 16 March 1993) was an Italian writer, journalist, poet, art and literary critic, dramatist, screenplay writer, theatrical director and painter.

== Biography ==
=== Childhood and youth ===
“It is enough to love reality, always, in every possible way, even in the precipitate and approximate way that has been mine. But love it. Apart from that, there are no precepts”.

Giovanni Testori was born in Novate Milanese, a town on the outskirts of Milan, the third of six siblings. Both his parents were originally from the upper Brianza area. His father, Edoardo, was from Sormano; his mother, Lina Paracchi, from Lasnigo. These were places that remained close to Testori's consciousness and a part of his creative imagery. His memories frequently return to the period of his childhood and his family, to which he remained intimately linked.

Edoardo Testori had moved from Sormano to set up a textile factory alongside the tracks of the Ferrovie Nord (Saft, F.lli Testori Filtri e Feltri, now Testori Spa). Beside it, he built his home. The house where Giovanni grew up, and where he spent the larger part of his existence, is today the seat of the Associazione Giovanni Testori.

Testori applied himself inconsistently during his earlier school years, but in 1939 he enrolled in the “liceo classico” [classical high school], obtaining “maturità” (high school certificate) in 1942.

While at the “liceo”, he cultivated his passion for art and the theatre. Before reaching the age of majority, he had published, as art critic, a series of articles in “Via Consolare”. The first to be written, in 1941, was a brief essay on Giovanni Segantini.

In addition to “Via Consolare”, Testori contributed to other magazines, such as “Architrave” of Bologna and “Pattuglia di Punta”, with articles dedicated especially to contemporary artists (from Scipione to Manzù and Carlo Carrà).

In September 1942, he enrolled in the faculty of architecture at the Politecnico di Milano.

=== The 1940s ===
In 1943, during his second year of studies at the Politecnico, Testori was compelled to evacuate with his family for several months to the big house at Sormano, in Valassina. This created an environment in which he could cultivate the other enthusiasm which he was to maintain for several years, that for painting, which he practiced as a self-taught artist.

In these years, alongside articles and monographs on themes of contemporary art (Manzù. Erbe, 1942; Henri Matisse. 25 disegni, 1943), Testori's first writings dedicated to renaissance artists appeared, from Debiti e crediti di Dosso Dossi (“Architrave”, Bologna, II, 4–5, February–March, p. 3) to Discorso sulle mani di Leonardo (“Pattuglia”, I, 7 May 1942) and Introduzione a Grünewald (“Architrave”, II, 7, May 1942).

In 1942, Testori also made his first appearance as a playwright, with two single-act pieces, La morte and Un quadro. The texts were published separately in “Via Consolare” and were issued together the following year in a booklet by Edizioni di Pattuglia. In 1943, moreover, “Posizione” (Novara) published his first short story, Morte di Andrea, while his first poem came out in 1945, in Elio Vittorini's “Il Politecnico”.

==== Towards a new Realism ====
During the years of the Second World War, pictorial activity acquired a significant weight for Testori, both practically and theoretically. He published articles which openly took a firm position in the debate between realism and abstraction which was animating the Italian artistic scene, under the strong influence of Picasso. Testori's own paintings also reflected this influence. His views on Realtà della pittura (Reality in Painting) were expounded in an article published in December 1945, in the first issue of the Milanese periodical “Argine Numero” (subsequently “Numero Pittura”), produced with companions and friends of “Corrente”. These included Ernesto Treccani and Renato Guttuso. The following year, in the same magazine, edited by Testori, there appeared Oltre Guernica. Manifesto del Realismo di pittori e scultori, signed, as well as by Testori himself, by Giuseppe Ajmone, Rinaldo Bergolli, Egidio Bonfante, Gianni Dova, Ennio Morlotti, Giovanni Paganin, Cesare Peverelli, Vittorio Tavernari and Emilio Vedova.

Testori's idea of reality in art, in this moment, was the opposite of that upheld by his painter friend Renato Guttuso. The aim was not to reach reality through painting, but “to be able to start from reality. To have, that is to say, a faith that allows this departure”. And not so much for painting, added Testori, “as for living”. A full approach to life first and art next is only possible by starting from a total immersion in reality.

==== Abandonment of painting ====
In 1947, Testori obtained a degree in letters at the Università Cattolica di Milano (to which he had transferred in March 1945). In his thesis, La forma nella pittura moderna, he considered the evolution of form in early 20th century European painting, declaring that the search was ongoing for a shared attitude to Italian realism. The last chapter, Fisica dello spirito, is a sort of manifesto in which he declares the need for a renewal of art in sacred spaces, which could be achieved if clients and artists were to come to terms with the language of the avant-garde, from Picasso to Léger.

His first period as a painter concluded with the frescoes, now lost, of the Four Evangelists, created in 1948 on the columns supporting the dome of the presbytery in the church of San Carlo al Corso in Milan, and the tormented Crucifixion (1949), now exhibited at Casa Testori. From then on, Testori temporarily abandoned painting, destroying most of his works and dedicating himself almost exclusively to writing.

==== Commitment to the theatre ====
Alongside his pictorial research, in the late 1940s Testori's enthusiasm for the theatre grew, due in part to his friendship with Paolo Grassi and his attendance at the newly created Piccolo Teatro. From 1947 to 1948, he curated a weekly column of theatre reviews for the periodical “Democrazia”.

The text of Testori's first play, La Caterina di Dio, has never been rediscovered. It was staged in 1948 at the theatre of the Basilica di Milano, in the deconsecrated church of San Paolo Converso, with Franca Valeri. In 1949 and 1950 he wrote another play, Tentazione nel convento, which was never performed in his lifetime. In March 1950, at the Teatro Verdi di Padova, the Compagnia del Teatro dell’Università, directed by Gianfranco De Bosio, staged another of Testori's works, Le lombarde.

=== The 1950s ===
In 1951, the exhibition Caravaggio e i caravaggeschi was mounted in Palazzo Reale, Milan. On this occasion, Testori met Roberto Longhi, the great art historian he had long admired for his critical commitment and for the quality of his prose. The meeting led to a long-lasting friendship and a collaboration with the newly born magazine “Paragone”, edited by Longhi himself. Testori's first essay for the magazine, in 1952, was on Francesco del Cairo, a painter now recognized as a major figure in 17th century figurative art.

In 1953, Testori published in “Paragone” an article on the 17th century painter Carlo Ceresa, from Bergamo, while he continued throughout the decade to support the activity of his friend Ennio Morlotti, who exhibited at the Galleria del Milione (1953), the Venice Biennials (1952, 1956) and the Quadrennial of Rome (1959).

In 1954, Einaudi's series I gettoni brought out his first novel, Il dio di Roserio. This was set among the cycling clubs of the Lombard province and outskirts, to which the author returned repeatedly to give a voice, laying bare their inner dramas, to the depths of humanity, using the same method that he had used in art criticism and practice, and in his theatrical invention. Already in this public debut, the experimental nature and the pictorial matrix of Testori's language, imbued with dialectic inflections, were evident.

In 1955, Testori curated the important Mostra del Manierismo piemontese e lombardo del Seicento, mounted in Palazzo Madama, Turin, and in Ivrea, with the support of the Centro Culturale Olivetti di Ivrea and of Vittorio Viale, Director of the Musei Civici of Turin. The catalogue focused on the characteristics of the painters operating in Lombardy and Piedmont during the period in which Carlo and Federico Borromeo were cardinals. These were artists for whom Testori himself was to coin the happy epithet of “pestanti” (“Plaguesters”), on account of the plague that threatened the territory of the Milanese Duchy from 1576 to 1630.

The following year, Testori collaborated in the first major monographic exhibition dedicated to Gaudenzio Ferrari, at the Museo Borgogna of Vercelli. In his essay in the catalogue, Gaudenzio e il Sacro Monte, Testori reassessed the work of the artist from Valsesia also as a sculptor.

Among Testori's personal predilections, the sweetness of Gaudenzio Ferrari's painting and sculpture would always represent for him the dimension of domestic affections. Testori's more visceral passions, on the other hand, were to find their match in the more tormented work of Antonio d’Enrico, known as Tanzio da Varallo. Testori curated the first monographic exhibition dedicated to this latter, mounted in the Musei Civici of Turin and at Varallo Sesia the following year.

In 1958, the “Biblioteca di letteratura” of Feltrinelli, edited by Giorgio Bassani, issued Il ponte della Ghisolfa, the first volume of short stories of the cycle I segreti di Milano, followed in 1959 by La Gilda del Mac Mahon and by Il Fabbricone in 1961. Testori related dramas and heroes from the outskirts of the city with an attitude of great humanity and understanding that was to bring him international success. The French and Spanish editions of Il ponte della Ghisolfa and Gilda del Mac Mahon were soon joined by translations of Il Fabbricone into English and German, as well as French and Spanish.

Still in 1958, Testori published a book on the frescoes in the Church of San Bernardino in Ivrea, in the heart of the Olivetti industrial settlement. These frescoes were the masterpiece of Giovanni Martino Spanzotti, an artist long active in the Piedmont territory during the 15th and 16th centuries.

=== The 1960s ===
==== At the theatre with Luchino Visconti ====
The cycle I segreti di Milano continued in 1960 with the publication of La Maria Brasca. The play was staged at the Piccolo Teatro of Milan, directed by Mario Missiroli and with Franca Valeri as the leading actor. That same year, L’Arialda, the first Italian theatre production forbidden to minors, came out. After overcoming numerous problems of censorship, it was given for the first time at the Teatro Eliseo by the company of Rina Morelli and Paolo Stoppa, directed and staged by Luchino Visconti. When in February 1961, the play reached the Teatro Nuovo of Milan, the day before the première the magistrate Carmelo Spagnuolo signed an order for the seizure of the scripts and the suspension of all repeat performances programmed. Testori and Feltrinelli faced criminal charges for the text, considered “greatly offensive to common feelings of decency”, especially for the story linking Eros, the hero's brother, and Lino, the boy with whom he is in love. Only in 1964 were the author and publisher absolved by a definitive sentence of the court.

Meanwhile, in summer 1960 at the Venice Cinema Exhibition, Visconti presented Rocco e i suoi fratelli. The screenplay of the film drew largely on several stories from Testori's Il Ponte della Ghisolfa di Testori. Among the actors were Alain Delon, Renato Salvatori and Anne Girardot.

Testori's linguistic experimentalism was meanwhile brought to nationwide attention by Alberto Arbasino who, in an article published in “Verri” of 1960, coined for himself, for the writer from Novate Milanese and for Pier Paolo Pasolini, the happy appellation of “the engineer's grandchildren”, thereby recognizing the origin of their research in the plurilinguism of Carlo Emilio Gadda.

While Testori continued to deal with early and contemporary art, he returned to the theatre in 1967 with La Monaca di Monza. Luchino Visconti was again the director for the debut of the play at the Teatro Quirino of Rome on 4 November. The leading player was Lilla Brignone, already named as dedicatee of the text in the printed edition, published by Feltrinelli.

==== Love poetry ====
In 1965, the year of his father's death, Feltrinelli brought out I Trionfi, a monumental poem of almost 12,000 lines. The book was the first of a poetic trilogy dedicated to Alain Toubas. It was followed by L’amore (1968) and Per sempre (1970). Testori had met the Frenchman Alain Pierre Toubas (1938-2021) at the end of the 1950s. He was the love of his life, his companion and, in some ways, his son. He is a key character to an understanding of Testori's involvement with the theatre, the evolution of his relationship with Luchino Visconti and the birth of the gallery named Compagnia del Disegno. Much of the author's erotic and sentimental imagery is linked to Toubas, whose lineaments Testori poetically saw in many of the paintings he most loved, such as Tanzio da Varallo's David.

==== A manifesto for the theatre ====
It was time for Testori to state publicly the intent of his theatrical direction. He did this with Il ventre del teatro, which appeared in “Paragone” of 1968 contemporaneously with the publication of Pier Paolo Pasolini's Manifesto per un nuovo teatro in “Nuovi Argomenti”. The article amounted to a complete rejection of everything Italian theatre stood for at that time. Both writers sustained the centrality of the word in the theatre. Pasolini proposed that the theatrical experience should be a “cultural rite”, linked to the word as a concept. For Testori, drama was incarnated in a “word-matter” that dug into the “lump of existence”. An “un-speakable” word that was, “first of all, horrible (unbearable) physiological” and found its maximum expression in the monologue.

Testori was working at this time on Erodiade, a play initially conceived for Valentina Cortese and repeatedly announced by the Piccolo Teatro di Milano but never programmed there. The text has a precise figurative inspiration: “Herodias, in the end, has always seemed to me one of the highest and most intense metaphors of art which, after the coming of Christ, can no longer be a metaphor of that incarnation. For this reason I have always loved, much more than the Herodias of the decadents, the Herodias of Caravaggio and his followers, Francesco Cairo in particular. There we really see this dark figure, in a continual struggle between malediction and salvation”.

==== The return to painting ====
After his abrupt abandonment of painting around 1950, Testori had resumed drawing and painting at least by 1968, beginning with the cycle of 73 Heads of John the Baptist, drawings made with a fountain pen while drafting Erodiade (and published only in 1987). In the following years, works by Testori were exhibited in four exhibitions dedicated to him, “at the Galleria Galatea di Mario Tazzoli of Turin (1971), at the Galerie Alexander Iolas of Milan (1974), at the Galleria del Naviglio di Giorgio Cardazzo, also in Milan (1975) and at the gallery Il Gabbiano of Roma (1976). The respective catalogues contained presentations by Luigi Carluccio, Piero Citati, Cesare Garboli and Giuliano Briganti”.

=== The 1970s ===
From the end of 1971 and the beginning of 1972, the exhibition Il Realismo in Germania was mounted at the Rotonda di Via Besana in Milan. It was curated by Testori, who had for many years been following with interest the development of Realism and New Objectivity in Germany, presented for the first time to the Italian public.

His work as writer and dramatist continued with the publication by Rizzoli, in 1972, of l’Ambleto, a rewriting of Shakespeare's tragedy. The text incarnated the linguistic theories of the author, being the fruit of a pastiche in which dialectal inflections coexist with terms derived from Spanish, French and Latin, as well as many neologisms.

L'Ambleto made its debut in Milan on 16 January 1973, inaugurating the Salone Pier Lombardo, the theatre newly founded by Testori himself with Franco Parenti, Andrée Ruth Shammah, Dante Isella and Maurizio Fercioni. The director was Andrée Ruth Shammah, the leading actor was Franco Parenti, dedicatee of the play. Testori's friendship with Parenti gave birth to the idea, initiated with Ambleto, of a “trilogia degli scarozzanti (travelling players)”, an imaginary “company of actors wandering around the lakes and the foothills of the Alps, putting on, here today, there tomorrow, famous plots, chopped and changed to suit their resources”. It was followed by Macbetto (1974), also from Shakespeare, and Edipus (1977), from Sophocles.

Testori remained constantly committed to his work as art critic. In 1973 he was involved in the major exhibition Il Seicento lombardo, mounted in Milan in Palazzo Reale and the Pinacoteca Ambrosiana.

In the following years, Testori published monographs on his beloved artists from the more realist trend of the Northern Italian Renaissance: Romanino e Moretto alla Cappella del Sacramento (1975), dedicated to the pictorial decorations in the chapel of that name in San Giovanni Evangelista in Brescia; a recognition of the paintings by Giovanni Battista Moroni in Val Seriana (1977) and a first reassessment of the work of the 18th century sculptor Beniamino Simoni at Cerveno (1976).

Testori continued to promote, through a series of exhibitions in private galleries, the work of modern and contemporary figurative artists from Gianfranco Ferroni to Cagnaccio di San Pietro, Cristoff Voll, Antonio García López, Pierre Combet Descombes, Abraham Mintchine, Max Beckmann, Helmut Kolle, Willy Varlin, Federica Galli, Francis Gruber, José Jardiel, Paolo Vallorz and many others.

==== Farewell to his mother ====
On 20 July 1977, Testori's mother, Lina Paracchi, always at the centre of his affections, died. The moment of her death was already prefigured in the poem Ragazzo di Taino, dated 1975–1976 and partially published only in 1980.

The period of grief and reflection for the loss of his mother coincided with a return towards the Christian faith, which he had in any case never abandoned, but which had always been complicated for him by an awareness of the torment and contradictions of life. This context gave birth to Conversazione con la morte: a monologue published by Rizzoli in 1978 and written for Renzo Ricci, after seeing his interpretation of the old servant Firs in Strehler's production of Chekhov's The Cherry Orchard. The actor died on 20 October of that year, without having been able to read the text and recite it on the stage. Testori himself interpreted it, with a first performance at the Pier Lombardo on 1 November 1978, followed by a tour extending to more than a hundred Italian centres.

This was the period in which Testori developed close links with several young people of the ecclesiastical movement Comunione e Liberazione, finding common ground with its founder, Luigi Giussani. With this latter, he was to pen a dialogue, Il senso della nascita. Colloquio con Don Luigi Giussani, published in 1980 and now translated into Spanish and English. Testori's frequentation of many young people gave rise to Interrogatorio a Maria, a play staged on 27 October 1979 in the Church of Santo Stefano in Milan by the Compagnia dell’Arca, with Laura Lotti, Andrea Soffiantini, Stefano Braschi, Franco Palmieri and stage direction by Emanuele Banterle.

==== Writer for the “Corriere della Sera” ====
Giovanni Testori's first article for the “Corriere della Sera” appeared on 10 September 1975. It was a review of an exhibition dedicated to Bernardino Luini, which had opened the previous August at Palazzo Verbania of Luino. This was the beginning of a long collaboration with the Milanese newspaper, at first with reviews of exhibitions and books, but later extending to more general commentary on items of news and culture.

Testori's contributions always had a strong ethical and moral impact on public opinion, making them the ideal successors to the “Corsair Writings” of Pasolini, who had died in November 1975. The first article to attract the attention of the press was La cultura marxista non ha il suo Latino (4 September 1977), an energetic reply to a leading article by Giorgio Napolitano (Intellettuali e progetto, on the front page of “L’Unità” on 28 August 1977), in which the author protested against what he considered the “ravenous occupation” of positions of power by communist intellectuals.

This was only the first of many ideological battles conducted from the pages of the “Corriere della Sera”, for which he also assumed, from 4 December 1978, the position of art critic and the editorship of the art page. He published more than eight hundred articles over the following sixteen years. Many of his most significant pieces on news items or reflections of an ethical, social and religious nature were gathered by the author himself, together with others that had appeared in “Il Sabato”, in the volume La maestà della vita, published by Rizzoli in 1982.

=== The 1980s ===
==== The second trilogy ====
Interrogatorio a Maria proved to be the beginning of a second trilogy, completed by Factum est (1981) and Post Hamlet (1983).

Factum est was written for Andrea Soffiantini and the newborn Compagnia del Teatro degli Incamminati, founded by Testori together with Emanuele Banterle. The first performance took place on 10 May 1981 in the Church of Santa Maria del Carmine in Florence. Andrea Soffiantini was the actor of a monologue structured in fourteen parts, like a via crucis, in which a foetus, from its mother's womb, is compelled to conquer, with much effort, the gift of speech, in order to implore its parents not to renounce to its birth.

Post Hamlet, Testori's third meditation on Shakespeare's Hamlet (after Ambleto and the cinema screenplay Amleto, published posthumously), was his last publication with Rizzoli. That same year, he moved to Mondadori with his collection of poetry Ossa mea (1981-1982).

==== On behalf of Alessandro Manzoni ====
1984 opened with the publication of I Promessi sposi alla prova. Azione teatrale in due giornate, the first volume of a series dedicated by Mondadori to “The Books of Giovanni Testori”. The piece was first staged on 27 January, marking a return of its author to the Pier Lombardo. The interpreters were Franco Parenti and Lucia Morlacchi. It was directed by Andrée Ruth Shammah. This was, for Testori, a return to Alessandro Manzoni, an author fundamental for his formation.

The following year he took part in the celebrations for the bicentenary of the writer's birth.

In 1986, Testori provided an intense essay on the possible sources and figurative references of I promessi sposi for the catalogue of Manzoni. Il suo e il nostro tempo, an exhibition mounted at Palazzo Reale, Milan. He also wrote the information sheets for several of the paintings exhibited.

Two conversations held by Testori are fundamental to an understanding of his thoughts on I promessi sposi and the role assumed by the novel in those years in Italian cultural debate. The first was with Alberto Moravia, on 29 November 1984 in Milan; the second was with Ezio Raimondi, on 3 December in Bologna.

==== The new faces of art ====
Testori's intense activity as art critic continued, with reviews of catalogues and exhibitions in the pages of the “Corriere della Sera”, throughout the 1980s. He also published several articles on international artists such as Francis Bacon in specialized magazines, including Flash Art and FMR, and continued his activity as a militant critic, committed to drawing the work of young painters and sculptors to the attention of the public and critics.

It was particularly through his attendance of the Studio d’Arte Cannaviello gallery of Milan that Testori was able to maintain his interest in new painters from Austria and Germany. For the figures from the German scene he considered most interesting (such as Hermann Albert, Peter Chevalier, Thomas Schindler, Rainer Fetting, Bern Zimmer and Klaus Karl Mehrkens), he identified a group of his own invention which he called the “Nuovi ordinatori (New Ordinators)” (headed by Hermann Albert) which he distinguished from the “Neuen Wilden (New Wild Ones” led by Rainer Fetting), almost as if finding continuity of language between Expressionism and the New Objectivity of the inter-war years.

==== Art criticism ====
Testori's production of occasional essays and writings during the 1980s resulted in some important incursions into the world of early and contemporary art.

In 1981, he curated an anthological exhibition of Graham Sutherland at the Galleria Bergamini of Milan and took part in the exhibition La Ca’ Granda. Cinque secoli di storia e d’arte dell’Ospedale Maggiore di Milano, organized in Palazzo Reale.

In the same year, Testori published a catalogue raisonné for Abraham Mintchine and promoted an exhibition for the artist at the Compagnia del Disegno gallery in Milan via a resounding article in Corriere della sera. Testori had high praise for Abraham Mintchine artwork and was puzzled by the naïveté of modern art history narratives which were able to miss on such extraordinary talent (predicting he will be nevertheless rediscovered).

In 1983, he curates a monographic exhibition on Guttuso at the Galleria Bergamini of Milan. The large painting, Spes contra spem, completed at Velate the previous year, was seen in public for the first time. Testori also returned to the theme of Francesco Cairo, assisting in the curatorship of an exhibition of this painter at Villa Mirabello, Varese.

In 1988, he dedicated an exhibition to Gustave Courbet nelle collezioni private and, the following year, exhibited works, also from private collections, by Daniele Crespi.

In 1990, Testori wrote the introduction to the Complete Catalogue of the Works of Van Gogh, issued by Cantini in the series “I gigli dell’arte”. It was also published in French the following year.

==== The first Branciatrilogia ====
During the mid-1980s, Testori resumed work on the idea of a theatre centred completely on the word, beginning a first Branciatrilogia, three plays written for the actor Franco Branciaroli. The first was Confiteor. The text took its inspiration from a news item, in which a man had killed his handicapped brother to save him from a life he considered incomplete and humiliating. It was staged for the first time at the Teatro di Porta Romana on 25 September 1986, directed by Testori with the assistance of Emanuele Banterle. The interpreters were Branciaroli and Mirton Vajani.

In 1988 it was the turn of In exitu, published as a novel by Garzanti (which had become Testori's publisher in 1986 with the collection of poetry Diadèmata). It was first staged, with Testori as co-leading player and director, at the Teatro della Pergola of Florence, on 9 November 1988. The following 13 December, for a single evening, the show was staged on the steps of the Stazione Centrale di Milano, the setting for the drama which dealt with the still contemporary theme of heroin addiction. It is one of Testori's most extreme texts, written “in a language that does not exist. There is a bit of Italian, a bit of Latin, a bit of French, but above all there is the language of a boy on the verge of his death throes, all splintered, broken, with the words split in half. It is a sort of mashed language, it's there and it isn't there, it never becomes clear and then repeats itself”.

The first Branciatrilogia concluded with Verbò. Autosacramental, a text based on the relationship between Verlaine and Rimbaud (the title encapsulates their surnames). It was performed by Testori himself and Branciaroli at the Piccolo Teatro of Milan on 20 June 1989 and was published posthumously at the author's wish, since he preferred to leave himself free to “recreate” the text every evening in the theatre.

==== The second Branciatrilogia ====
At the end of the 1980s, Testori contracted a tumour which caused him to withdraw from public appearances, but which did not limit either his creativity or his productivity.

In 1989 he published ...et nihil, a collection of poetry composed in 1985 and 1986. This was awarded the “Premio di poesia Pandolfo”.

His health worsened in 1990 and he was taken into the Ospedale San Raffaele of Milan. He continued to write there frenetically, dedicating himself to several projects at the same time. He concluded a Verse translation of St. Paul's Second Letter to the Corinthians, issued in 1991 by Longanesi, his last publisher, and continued to work on theatre pieces, starting on a second Branciatrilogia. Two works saw the light, Sfaust in 1990 and sdisOrè in 1991, both staged by the Compagnia degli Incamminati, directed by Testori and Emanuele Banterle. The sole interpreter was Franco Branciaroli. The première of Sfaust was given at the Teatro Nazionale of Milan on 22 May 1990, that of sdisOrè on 11 October 1991 at the Teatro Goldoni of Venice.

The third and last act of the second Branciatrilogia was to have been, among the various corrections and projects remaining on paper, I tre lai. Cleopatràs, Erodiàs, Mater Strangosciàs, published posthumously in 1994.

=== The last years ===
In the long months following an operation in the summer of 1990, Testori alternated periods in the Ospedale San Raffaele with convalescence at Inverigo, in Brianza, or in Varese, at the Hotel Palace, where Luca Doninelli produced a book-interview published a few months after the writer's death (Conversazioni con Testori, Milan 1993, rep. 2002).

In 1992, Testori was able to see the publication of Gli angeli dello sterminio, his last novel, set in an apocalyptic Milan, almost a prophecy of the whirlwind which was forcing the city, at the time of the book's publication, into the throes of the corruption scandal known as Tangentopoli.

His last text for the theatre was Regredior, a play published posthumously in 2013 and never staged.

The writer died in the Ospedale San Raffaele of Milan on 16 March 1993.
