= Jakob Eisenscher =

Israeli artist (1896–1980)

Jakob Eisenscher יעקוב אייזנשר
- Born: 5 January 1896; Czernowitz, Bukovina, Austria-Hungary
- Died: 1980 (aged 83–84)
- Education: Academy of Fine Arts Vienna
- Known for: Painting
- Movement: Israeli art

Jakob Eisenscher (Hebrew: יעקוב אייזנשר; 1896–1980) was born in the Austro-Hungarian Empire. He was an Israeli artist.

== Biography ==
Jakob Eisenscher was born in Czernowitz, Bukovina in 1896 to Israel Eisenscher and Augustina (née Karber). As a young man, Eisenscher attended the Academy of Fine Arts Vienna. In his youth, Eisenscher was associated with a group of Jewish intellectuals that included Itsik Manger, Eliezer Steinbarg, Bernard Reder and others.

In 1914, he was drafted and sent to the Russian front in Galicia. In 1915, while stationed in the Alps, he was taken prisoner by the Italian army. He remained in a prisoner-of-war camp throughout World War I and spent much of his time painting. After the war, Eisenscher returned to Czernowitz and worked as a photographer.

Eisenscher immigrated to France in the early 1930s. He worked in Paris for five years, during which he was exposed to Cubism and became heavily influenced by the work of Pablo Picasso and Georges Braque.

In 1935, Eisenscher immigrated to Israel. He was teaching at the Bezalel Academy of Arts and Design between 1952–67. There, Eisenscher worked with many Israeli artists, many of whom later became well known, prominent figures in Israeli art. Eisenscher exhibited his work all over the world.

In the beginning of his career, Eisenscher produced drawings, woodcuts and figurative paintings. Influenced by German Expressionism, Eisenscher eventually began creating portraits and figurative paintings. By the 1950s, he was interested in painting Cubist-style landscapes which became a major focus for him. His paintings also included visions of the Jewish "shtetls" in Eastern Europe, markets, synagogues and scenes of Israel and its people. His series "Gate" (1969) received much attention as well as the painting "The Night of the 29th of November" which is part of the Knesset collection.

Jakob Eisenscher died in 1980.

A collection of the artist's portrait photographs and letters from the Eisenscher estate is found today at the Information Center for Israeli Art in the Israel Museum, Jerusalem.

== Awards and recognition ==
- 1947 Dizengoff Prize for Painting and Sculpture, Municipality of Tel Aviv-Yafo
- 1953 Participated in São Paulo Art Biennial
- 1957 Participated in Venice Biennale
- 1958 Haifa Fund Prize, Haifa Municipality

== Education ==
- Academy of Fine Arts Vienna
- Bezalel Academy of Arts and Design, Jerusalem

== Teaching ==
- 1952–67 Bezalel Academy of Arts and Design, Jerusalem

== Exhibitions ==
- 1927 Municipal Museum, Czernowitz
- 1929 Hasefer Gallery, Bucharest
- 1935 "Le Balcon" Gallery, Paris, France
- 1944 Katz Gallery, Tel Aviv
- 1950 Jerusalem Artists House
- 1954 Tel Aviv Museum of Art
- 1955 Mikra Studio Gallery, Tel Aviv
- 1957 National Museum, Bezalel, Jerusalem, Israel
- 1960 Bet Zevi, Ramat Gan, Israel
- 1964 Tel Aviv Museum, Dizengoff House
- 1965 Yad Lebanim, Rechovoth, Israel
- 1970 Artist's House, Tel Aviv
- 1974 Rosenfeld Gallery, Tel Aviv
- 1979 Rosenfeld Gallery, Tel Aviv

== See also ==
- Visual arts in Israel
