= Max (Mordechai) Farbmann =

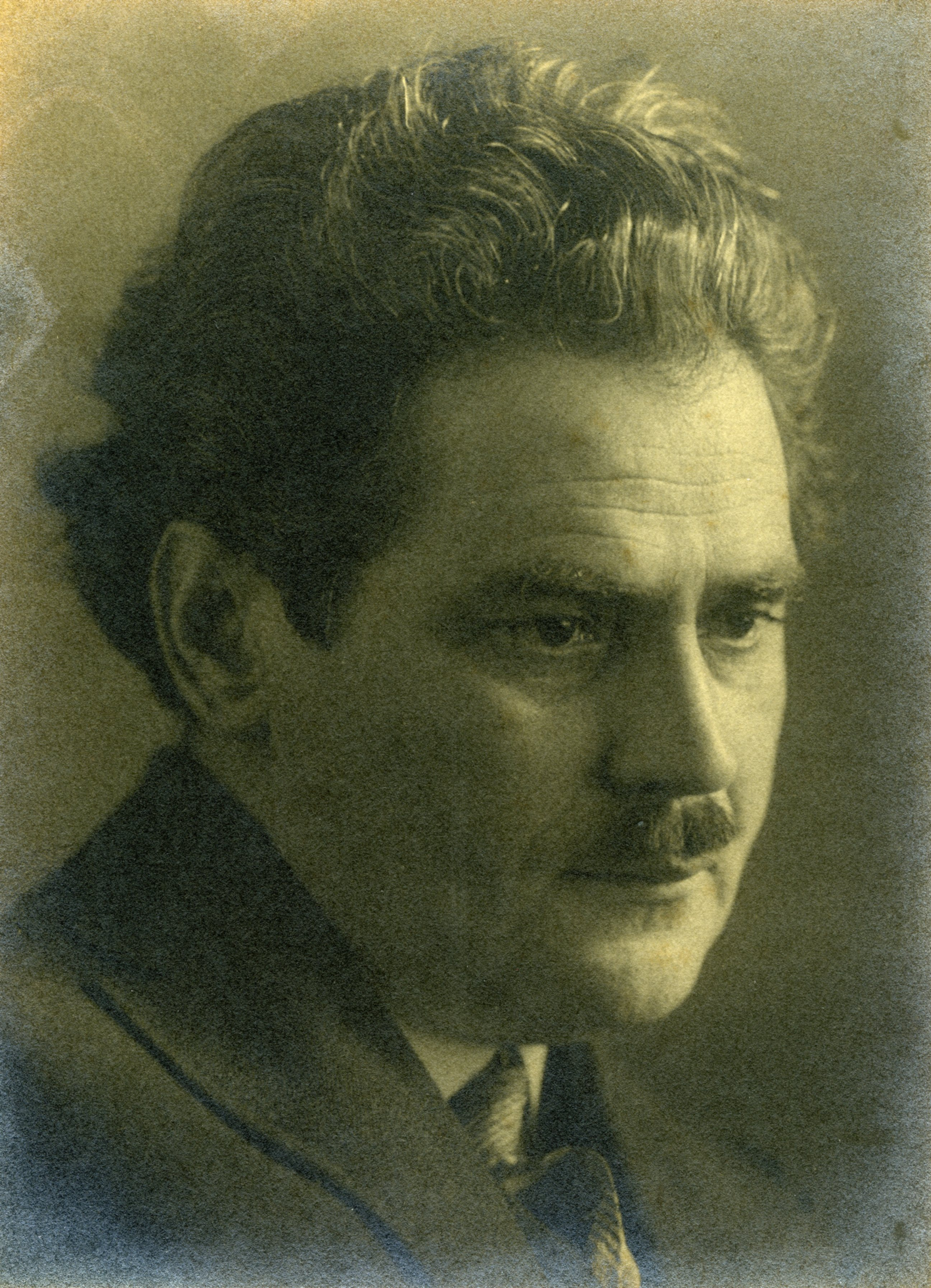
- Max (Mordechai) Farbmann
- Born: 1 April 1886; Salakas, Lithuania
- Died: 20 April 1950 (aged 64); Israel
- Education: Academy of Fine Arts Vienna
- Known for: Sculptor
- Movement: Israeli art

Max (Mordechai) Farbmann (1 April 1886 – 20 April 1950) was a Lithuanian Jewish sculptor who achieved prominence in Europe, particularly Vienna, Austria, during the early 20th century. He was responsible for designing the Lithuanian Independence Monument in his native Salakas.

== Biography ==
Max (Mordechai) Farbmann was born in 1886 in Salakas (Solok) in present-day Lithuania, and moved to Vienna at the age of 20 to study sculpture. There, he earned a reputation, leading the Vienna Arts Academy to purchase one of his works – a noted achievement for a Jewish artist. Among his works were commissioned sculpted busts of prominent European figures, including many leading statesmen, as well as the Lithuanian Independence Monument, which was erected in his hometown of Solok in 1930. Farbmann was a versatile sculptor who worked in multiple mediums, including bronze, wood, stone, and ivory. His carvings focused primarily on detail and atmosphere, revealing an intimate knowledge of and appreciation for the subjects.

In 1933, Farbmann settled in Tel Aviv, Israel at the invitation of the mayor of the city. In an interview by the South African Jewish Times in 1952, his daughter Ruth stated that due to a pre-existing taboo against making images in the Jewish culture caused by the Biblical commandment "thou shalt not make images", "my father [M. Farbmann] was a simple teacher [at the Balfour College in Tel Aviv] in his last years because he could not make a living as a sculptor". Nevertheless, Farbmann continued to create sculptures, focusing more on Jewish themes in his later career. He died in Israel in 1950, aged 64.

Since 2015, a collection of artist's portrait photographs and letters from Farbmann's estate is found today at the Information Center for Israeli Art in the Israel Museum, Jerusalem. His works can be found in museums in Israel and Austria.

== Gallery ==
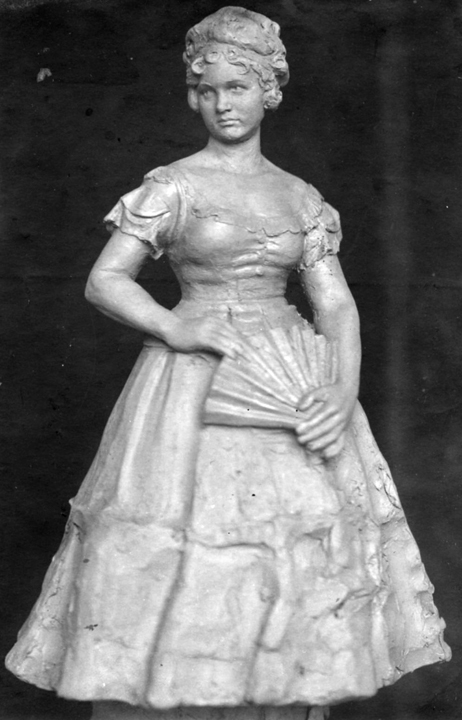
Mizi Bednarek, Opera Singer of Vienna, undated sculpture
Photograph from the Max (Mordechai) Farbmann Archive at the Information Center for Israeli Art, The Israel Museum, Jerusalem

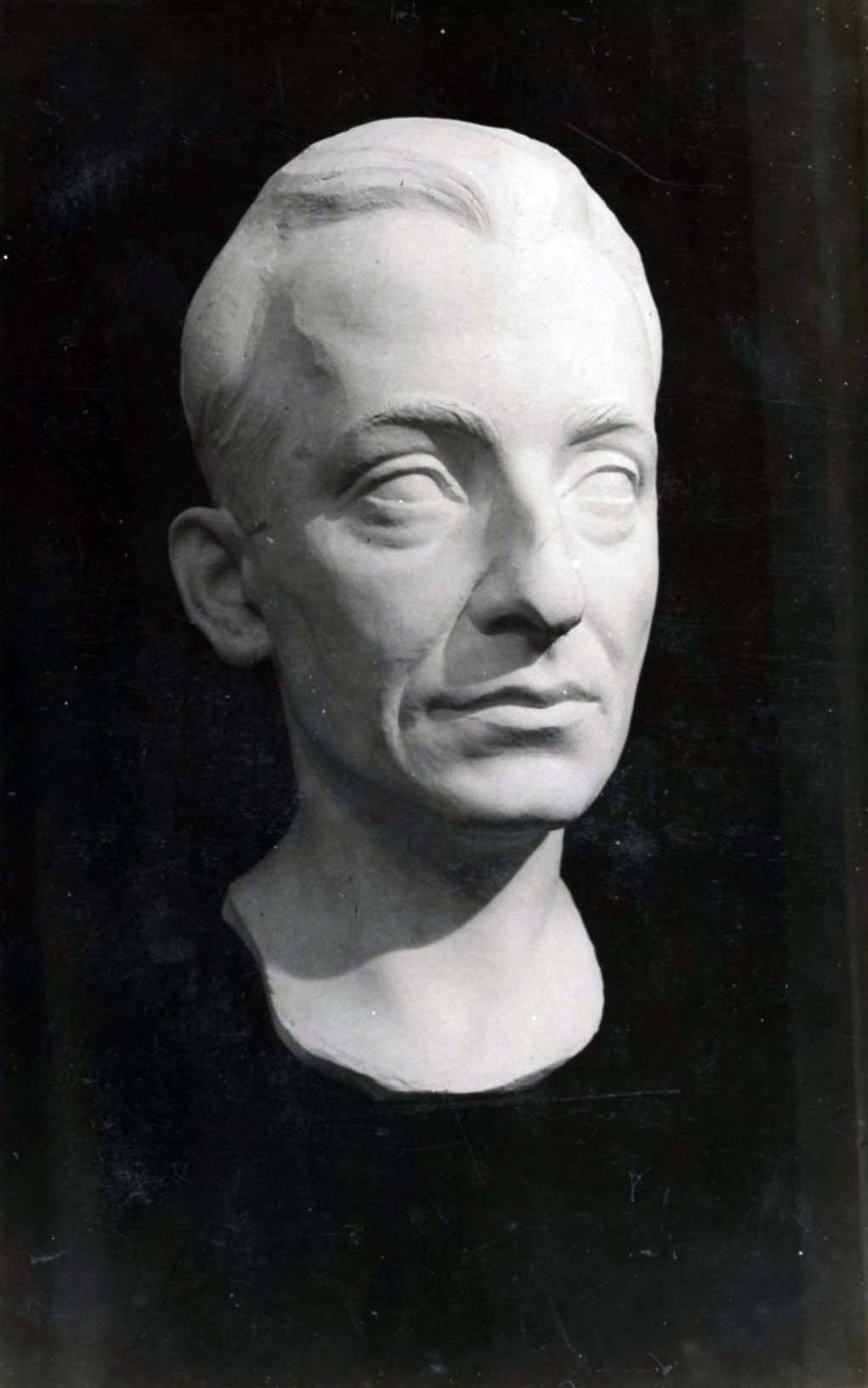
Portrait of Saul Riger, 1930s-1940s
Photograph from the Max (Mordechai) Farbmann Archive at the Information Center for Israeli Art, The Israel Museum, Jerusalem

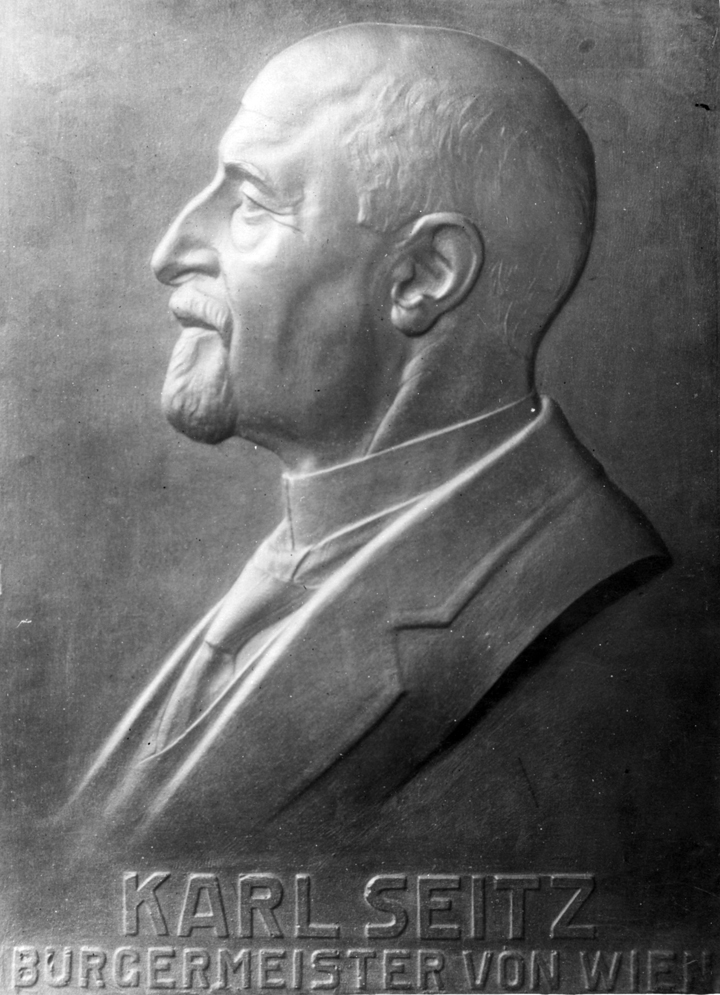
Portrait of Karl Seitz, Mayor of Vienna, 1923–1933
Photograph from the Max (Mordechai) Farbmann Archive at the Information Center for Israeli Art, The Israel Museum, Jerusalem

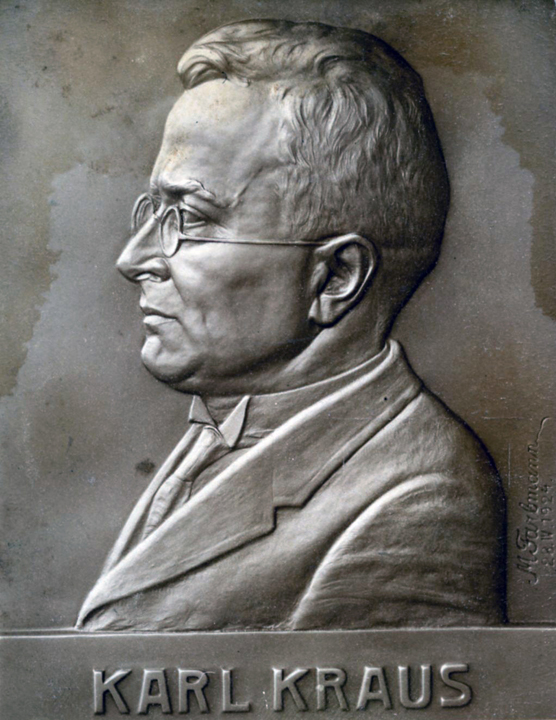
Portrait of Karl Kraus, 1920s (?)
Photograph from the Max (Mordechai) Farbmann Archive at the Information Center for Israeli Art, The Israel Museum, Jerusalem

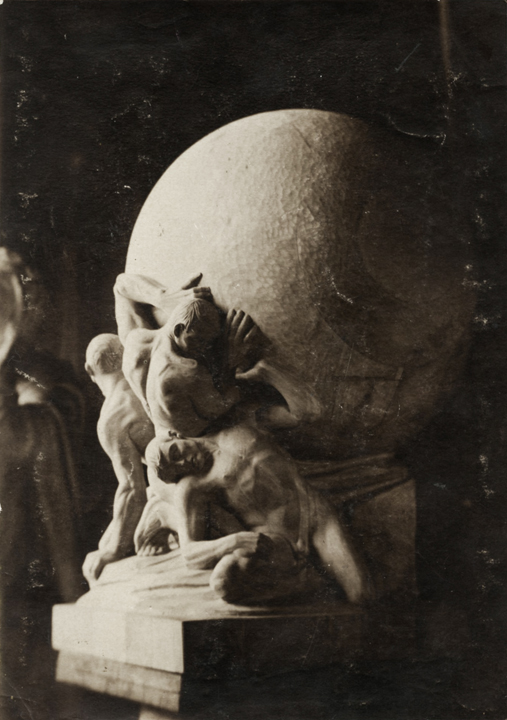
The Burden of the World or The Symbolic Group, undated sculpture
Photograph from the Max (Mordechai) Farbmann Archive at the Information Center for Israeli Art, The Israel Museum, Jerusalem

== See also ==
Visual arts in Israel
