= Israel Zafrir =

Israeli photographer (1911-2016)

Israel Zafrir ישראל צפריר
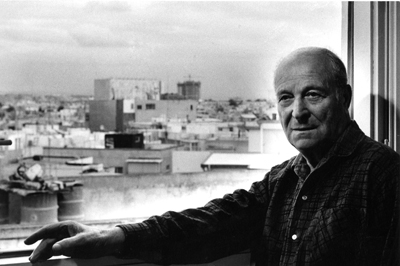
- Born: June 8, 1911; Myslova, Pidvolochysk
- Died: December 3, 2016 (aged 105)
- Known for: Photographic art reproduction
- Movement: Israeli art

Israel Zafrir (Hebrew: ישראל צפריר; June 8, 1911 – December 3, 2016) was an Israeli photographer. Zafrir was one of the founding fathers of modern documentary photography in Israel.

== Biography ==
Zafrir was born in Pidvolochysk. his parents were Solomon Glaser and Regine Rifke Baumöhl. The family moved to Vienna in 1913 where they lived in Ottakring. He arrived to British Palestine in 1935. He and his wife Georgette were residents of Bat Yam. They divorced very late in life (both were in their 80s).

== Photography career ==
From the 1950s, Zafrir documented works of art for artists and museums in Israel. These photographs were published in catalogs and books on art history, such as Art in Israel (1965) by art critic Ran Shechori. Zafrir photographed the works of many prominent artists including members of the New Horizons ("Ofakim Hadashim") group, Yosef Zaritsky, Yitzhak Danziger and Yechiel Shemi. In the 1960s, Zafrir held a number of exhibits featuring his photographs of monuments and statues. In May 1960 he exhibited at Yad Lebanim in Petach Tikva, and in September 1966, at the Youth Center of the Workers Association in Ramla.

Zafrir donated his photography collection to the Israel Museum, Jerusalem. The Israel Zafrir Photographer Archive is housed at the museum's Information Center for Israeli Art. It contains some 20,000 negatives, positives and slides documenting the work of many of the leading Israeli artists of the mid- and late-twentieth century. Most of the collection consists of black and white photographs, although some are in color. The Information Center is digitizing and cataloging the collection to make the images more accessible as a joint project of the Judaica Division of the Harvard Library and the Israel Museum.

== Gallery ==
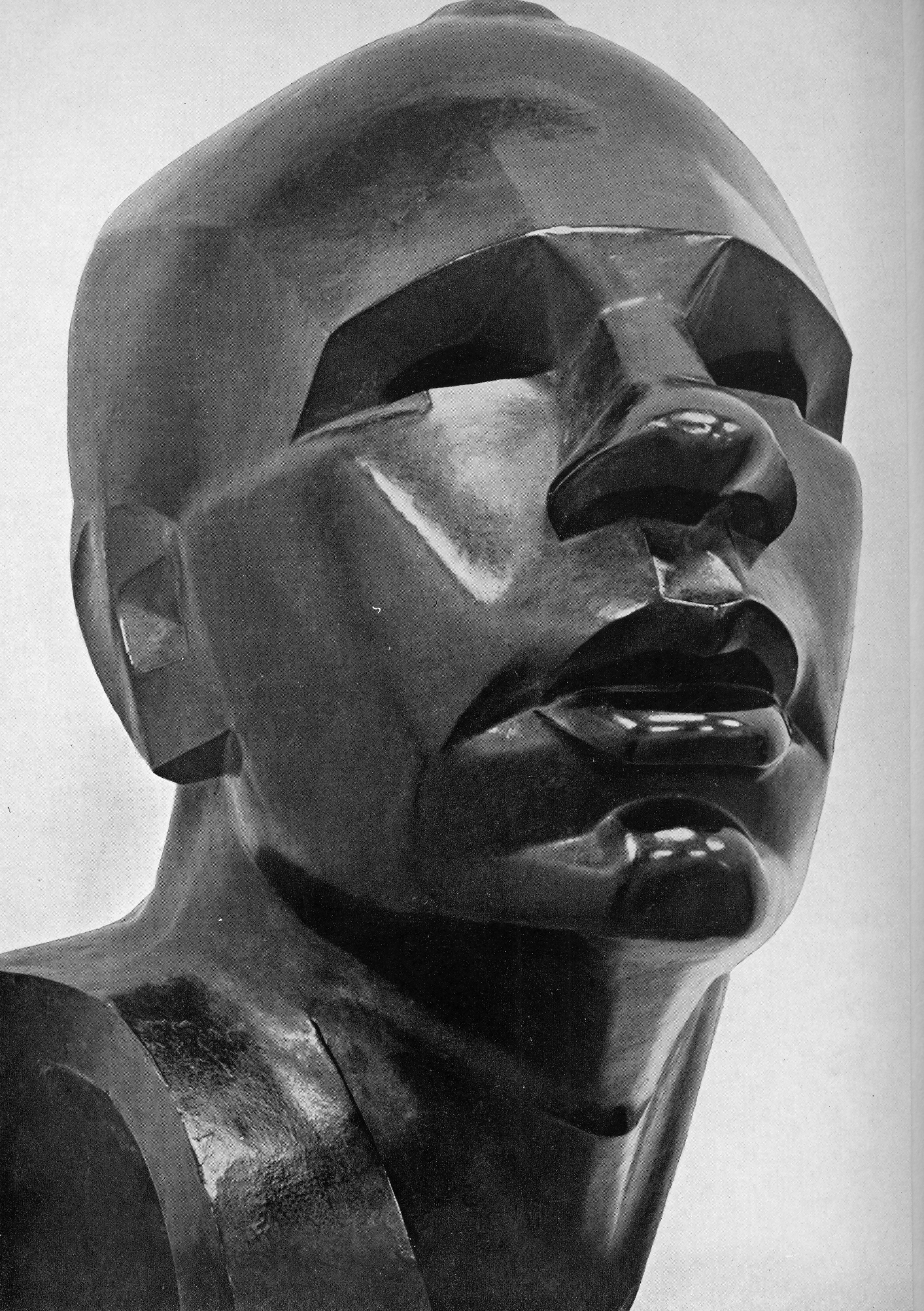
Portrait of Aharon Meskin by sculptor Zeev Ben-Zvi

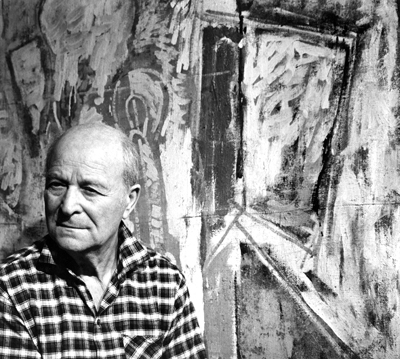
Photo portrait of artist Joseph Zaritsky

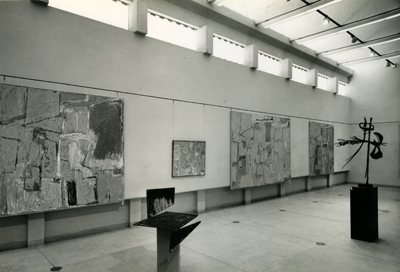
The 9th New Horizons ("Ofakim Hadashim") exhibition, Tel Aviv Museum of Art, April 1959

== Published works ==
- Jacques Loutchansky. Sculptures. 1957 (Hebrew)
- Aaron Priver. Sculptures . Photography, Israel Zafrir. Tel Aviv: Y. Chechick, 1959 (Hebrew)
- Oren Baruch. Stories of Ahad Ha'm. Photography, Israel Zafrir. Tel Aviv: Yad LeBanim [Memorial Hall for Fallen Soldiers] 1960 (Hebrew)
- Arie Resnik. Selected Works 1942–1962 – Sculptures. 1963 (Hebrew)
- Benjamin Tammuz & Max Wykes-Joyce, eds. Art in Israel. Tel Aviv: Massada Publishing (Hebrew) 1963; English, 1965.
- Israel: VIII Sao Paulo Biennale 1965. Photography, Israel Zafrir. Tel Aviv: United Artists, 1965 (Hebrew)
- Israel: XXXIII Venice Biennale 1966. Photography, Israel Zafrir. Jerusalem: Ministry of Education 1966 (Hebrew)
- David Meshulam: Paintings, 1960–1968. Photography, Israel Zafrir and Ran Erde. Tel Aviv: Z. Reuben, 1969. (Hebrew)
- Moshe Levine. The Tabernacle: Its Structure and Utensils. Photography, Israel Zafrir. Melechet Hamiskan, 1969
- Nachum Gutman. City of Sand and Sea – Mosaic History of Tel Aviv – Jaffa. Photography, Israel Zafrir. Ramat Gan: Massada, 1979
- Ran Shechori. Art in Israel. Photography, Israel Zafrir. Tel Aviv: Sadan Publishing, 1974.
- Ehud Ben Ezer. Nahum Gutman. Givataim: Masada, 1984
- Mirah Vikselbaum. In two stages – Poems and photographs of sculptures. Photography, Israel Zafrir. Tel Aviv: Akad, 1985 (Hebrew)
- Elisheva Cohen. Anna Ticho Photography, Israel Zafrir. Jerusalem: The National Council for Culture and the Arts, 1986 (Hebrew)
- Mirah Vikselbaum. Heads of a Woman. Photography, Israel Zafrir. Tel Aviv: Akad, 1986 (Hebrew)
- Miriam Or. Sioma Baram: His Art. Photography, Israel Zafrir. Tel Aviv: Arieli Press, 1986. (Hebrew)
- Ariella Epstein. B. Lishansky. Photography, Israel Zafrir. Tel Aviv: MOD Publishing, 1988. (Hebrew)
- Ruth Horam. Ruth Horam, Paintings. Photography, Israel Zafrir. Tel Aviv: R. Horam Sabinsky Press, 1992.
- Daṿid Toren. She Threw Herself from the Window. Poems illustrated with sculptures by Mirah Vikselbaum photographed by Israel Zafrir. Tel Aviv: Akad, 1992 (Hebrew)
- Genia Berger. Works for the Theatre. 1994
- Yosl Bergner, A Retrospective. Exhibition catalogue. 2000
- Yona Fischer, ed. Jacob Zim. Photography, Israel Zafrir and Ran Erde. Tel Aviv: IQ. 2003

== See also ==
- Visual arts in Israel
- List of Israeli visual artists
