= Abraham Mintchine =

French Jewish painter, of the École de Paris

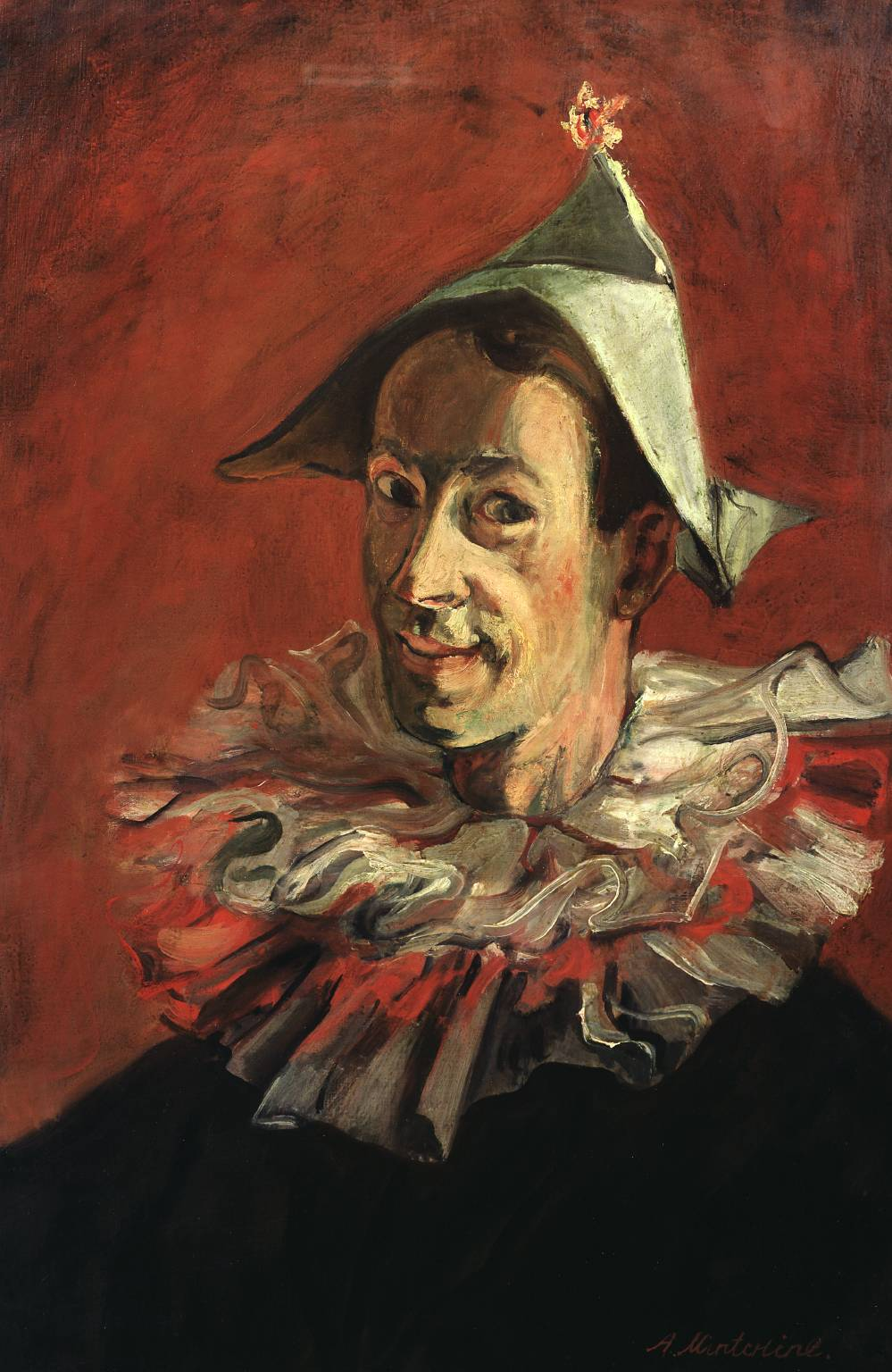
- Portrait of the Artist as a Harlequin
- Born: 4 April 1898; Kyiv, Russian Empire
- Died: 25 April 1931 (aged 33); La Garde, Var, France
- Education: Kyiv Art College
- Known for: Pierrot and Harlequin as subjects in paintings
- Style: Expressionism, Cubism
- Movement: École de Paris
- Patrons: René Gimpel

Abraham Mintchine (4 April 1898 – 25 April 1931) was one of the major painters associated with the artists' environment known as School of Paris. A Jewish painter, born in Kyiv, he immigrated to Paris in 1925. His known artwork was produced mostly while in Paris and la Garde, between 1926 and 1931.

He is famous for vibrant paintings where mysticism is also often present. His work can be related to expressionism, although as highlighted by Giovanni Testori, these categories which are convenient in art history are often too narrow to characterize painters like Mintchine.

== Early life ==
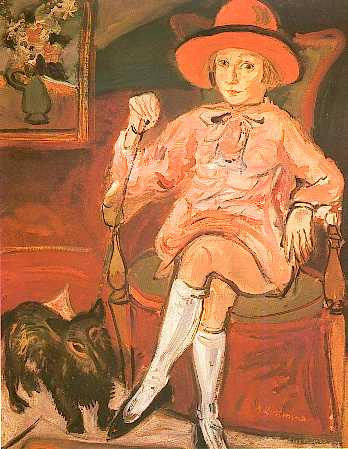
Fille de Louise Manteau (oil on canvas, 92x73cm) displays the intensity of Mintchine's artwork.

Mintchine was born in Kyiv where at age 13 he was an apprentice to a goldsmith. He began painting from the age of 16 and studied at the Kyiv Art School (together with Josyf Weissblatt, Olexandr Tyshler) and at Olexandra Exter. Later he left Ukraine for Berlin in 1923. In Berlin he designed sets and costumes for the Jewish theatre. At the time of his first exhibition in Berlin he displayed artwork in a style close to Cubism (only one painting from this period is known).

== School of Paris ==
Mintchine's most prolific and self-defining period started when he arrived in Paris around 1925. There he developed an exalted style, through dense and vibrant compositions. Mintchine's life was not easy. In extreme poverty and married with a child, he nonetheless succeeded to develop a characteristic style. Mintchine often integrated mysticism in his compositions (often representations of angels or angelic elements such as wings).

In 1929, the art dealer René Gimpel identified Mintchine as a "genius" painter and start buying all his paintings. About Mintchine's condition, he wrote in his journal: "he barely managed to scrape a 100 sous to live on; he wouldn't eat, and, dying of hunger would say to his wife: 'Eat, Mintchine isn't hungry'."

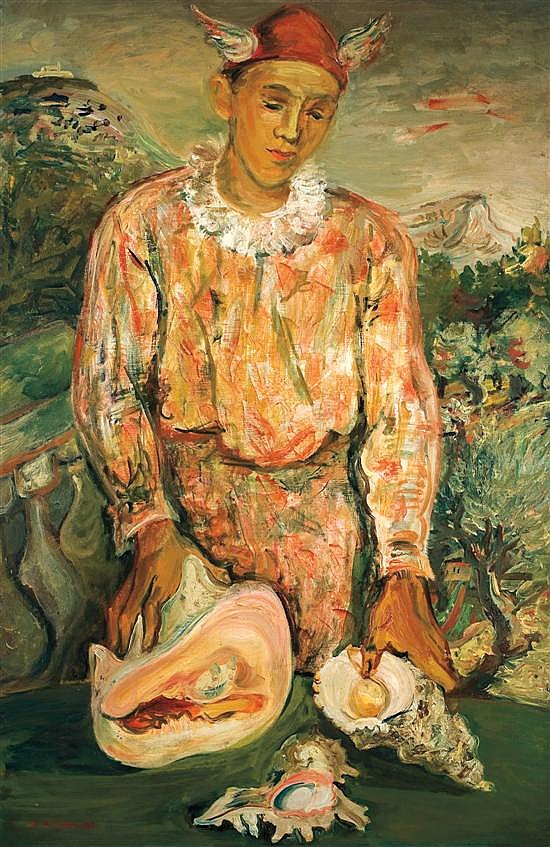
In Pierrot (oil, 92x60cm), mystical elements can be observed.

Mintchine's art reflects an exceptional intensity. His artwork is less tormented than Soutine's, conveying passion through great poetry (often with the addition of mystical elements). Mintchine's life was short but very prolific. Suffering from tuberculosis, he died at only 33 of a brain aneurysm (or possibly heart attack) while painting The Hill with Red Flowers.

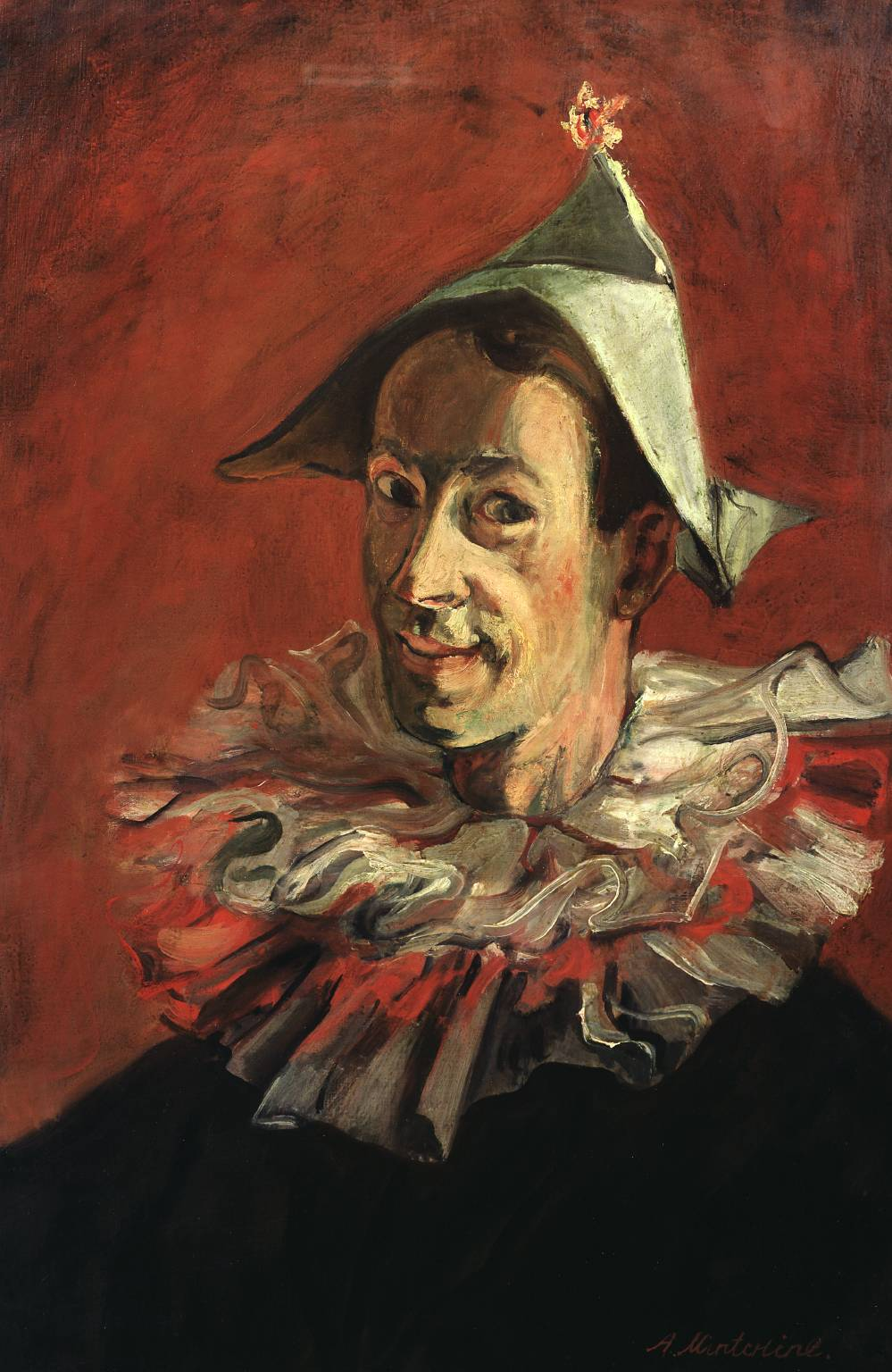
Portrait of the Artist as a Harlequin (Tate Gallery): Pierrot and Harlequin are iconic subjects in Mintchine's paintings.

== Memory and legacy ==
Due to his death at a young age his artwork is generally rarer than others from the same period. More recently, several signed counterfeits have emerged. However, many of his artworks have been published by Massimo Di Veroli who continues to authenticate it. Abraham Mintchine’s artwork is present in collections of major Museums and galleries, including Tate.

In 2022 the Mintchine Society was launched. The association has for role to protect and promote Abraham Mintchine’s artwork. It published a new website which contains an up-to date catalogue raisonné and a variety of documents about Abraham Mintchine. The platform also offers a unique point of contact for collectionneurs and curators all over the world.

== See also ==
- Expressionism
- Chaim Soutine
- Yitzhak Frenkel Frenel
- Alexandra Exter
- Giovanni Testori
