= Novate Milanese =

- Comune
- Città di Novate Milanese
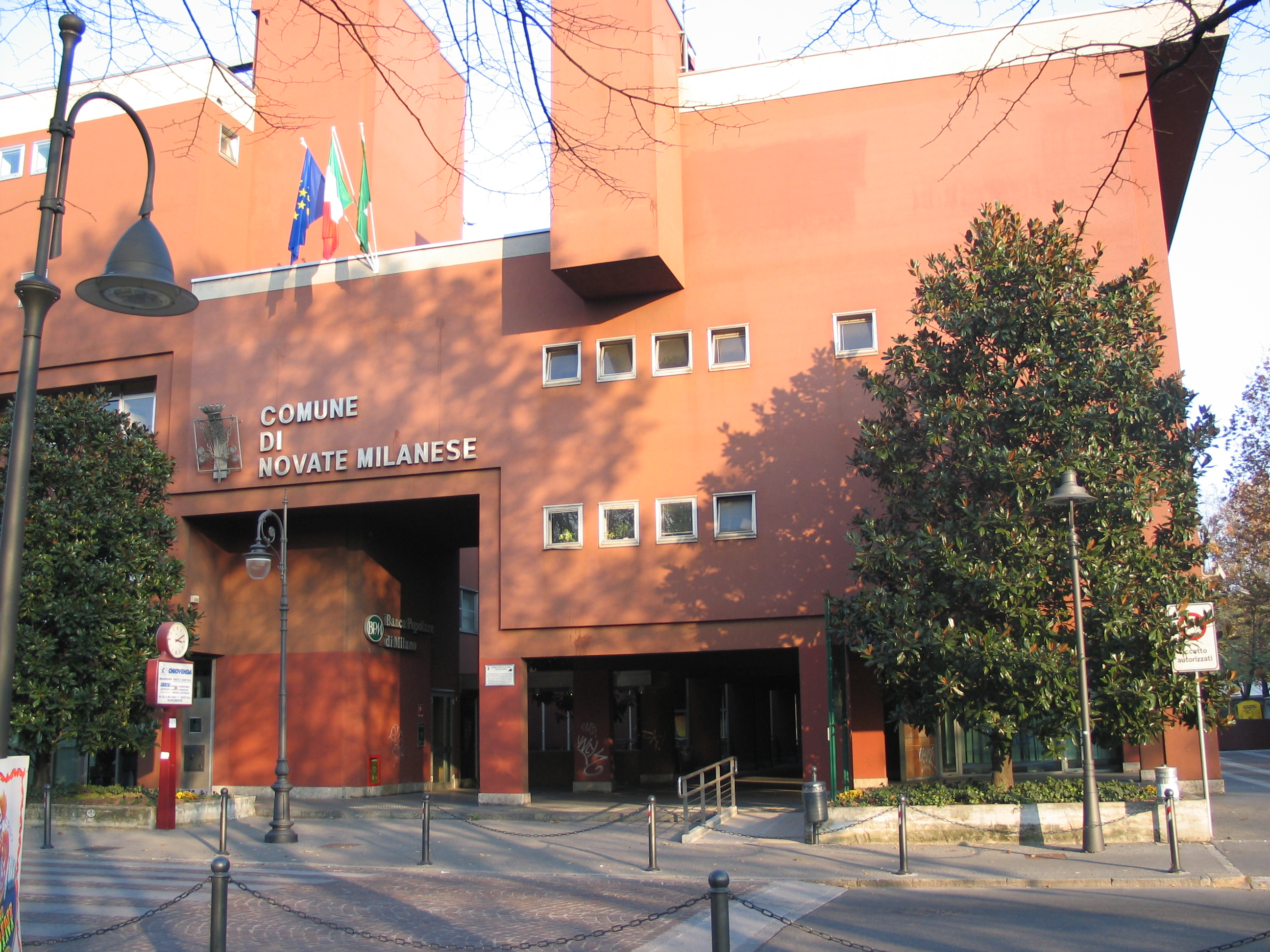
- City hall

- Coat of arms

- Location within Italy Location within Lombardy
- Coordinates: 45°32′N 9°8′E
- Country: Italy
- Region: Lombardy
- Metropolitan city: Milan (MI)

Government
  - Mayor: Gian Maria Palladino

Area
  - Total: 5.5 km^{2} (2.1 sq mi)
- Elevation: 146 m (479 ft)

Population (30 November 2018)
  - Total: 20,033
  - Density: 3,600/km^{2} (9,400/sq mi)
- Demonym: Novatesi
- Time zone: UTC+1 (CET)
  - Summer (DST): UTC+2 (CEST)
- Postal code: 20026
- Dialing code: 02
- Patron saint: Sts. Gervasius and Protasius
- Saint day: 19 June
- Website: Official website

Novate Milanese (Milanese: Novàa) is a comune (municipality) in the Metropolitan City of Milan in the Italian region Lombardy, located about 8 kilometres (5 mi) northwest of Milan.

Novate Milanese borders the following municipalities: Bollate, Baranzate, Cormano, Milan.

Novate received the honorary title of city with a presidential decree on 16 January 2004.

== Transport ==
Novate Milanese had a station on the Milan–Saronno railway and it is served by S1 and S3 lines of Milan Transportation System.
A bus line, operated by ATM, connect Novate Milanese and Affori.

== Notable people ==
- Giovanni Testori
- Vincenzo Torriani
