= Armando Cougnet =

Armando Cougnet (Nice, January 20, 1880 – Milan, December 14, 1959) was an Italian journalist, known for being the first organizer of the Giro d’Italia.

== Biography ==
At eighteen, Cougnet began writing for La Gazzetta dello Sport, Italy’s first sports newspaper. In 1902, he became its administrative director, a role he maintained through changes in ownership (1913 and 1922). For two years (1911 and 1912), he was the sole owner of the Gazzetta, and during World War II, he also served as its director (1943–1944).

He helped organize races created by the Gazzetta, notably Milan–San Remo, which debuted in 1907. He later conceived the idea of organizing a national stage race in Italy. In 1909, he became the patron of the newly founded Giro d’Italia, managing it until 1948. Cougnet is credited with the idea of dressing the race leader in a different-colored jersey: the pink jersey (maglia rosa), introduced in 1931.
