= Tourism in Israel =

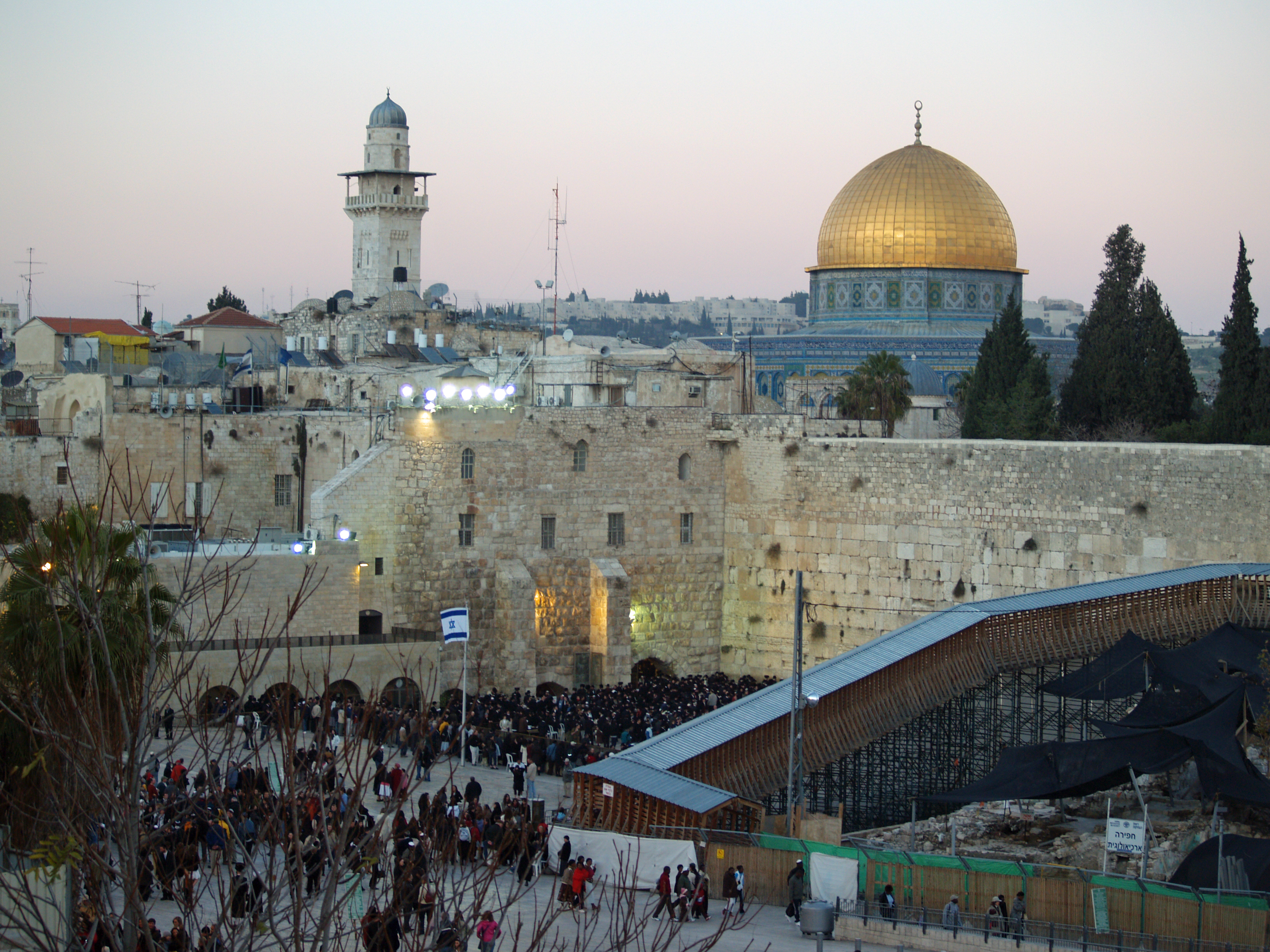
The Western Wall and Dome of the Rock in the Old City of Jerusalem

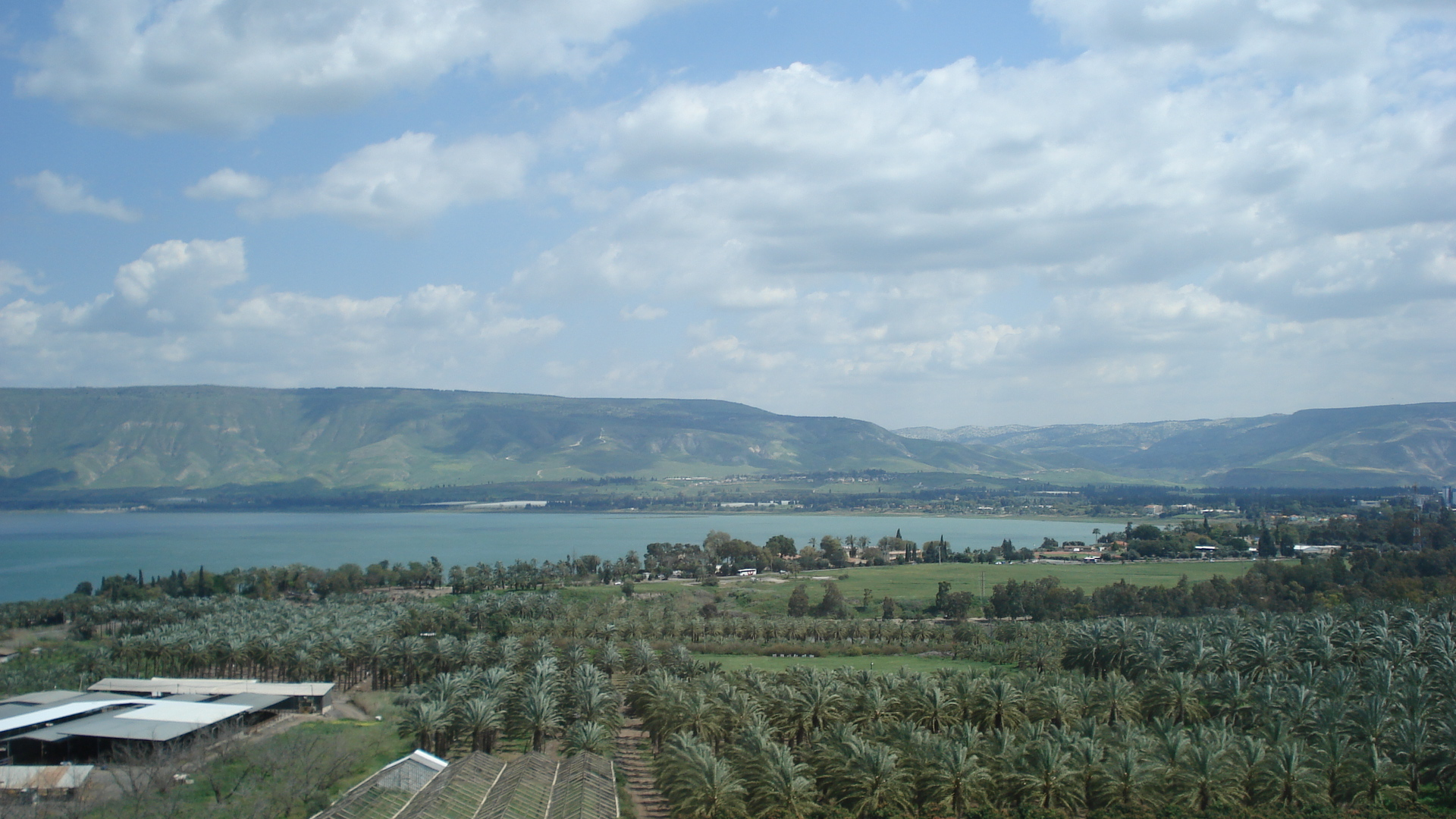
An aerial view of the Sea of Galilee

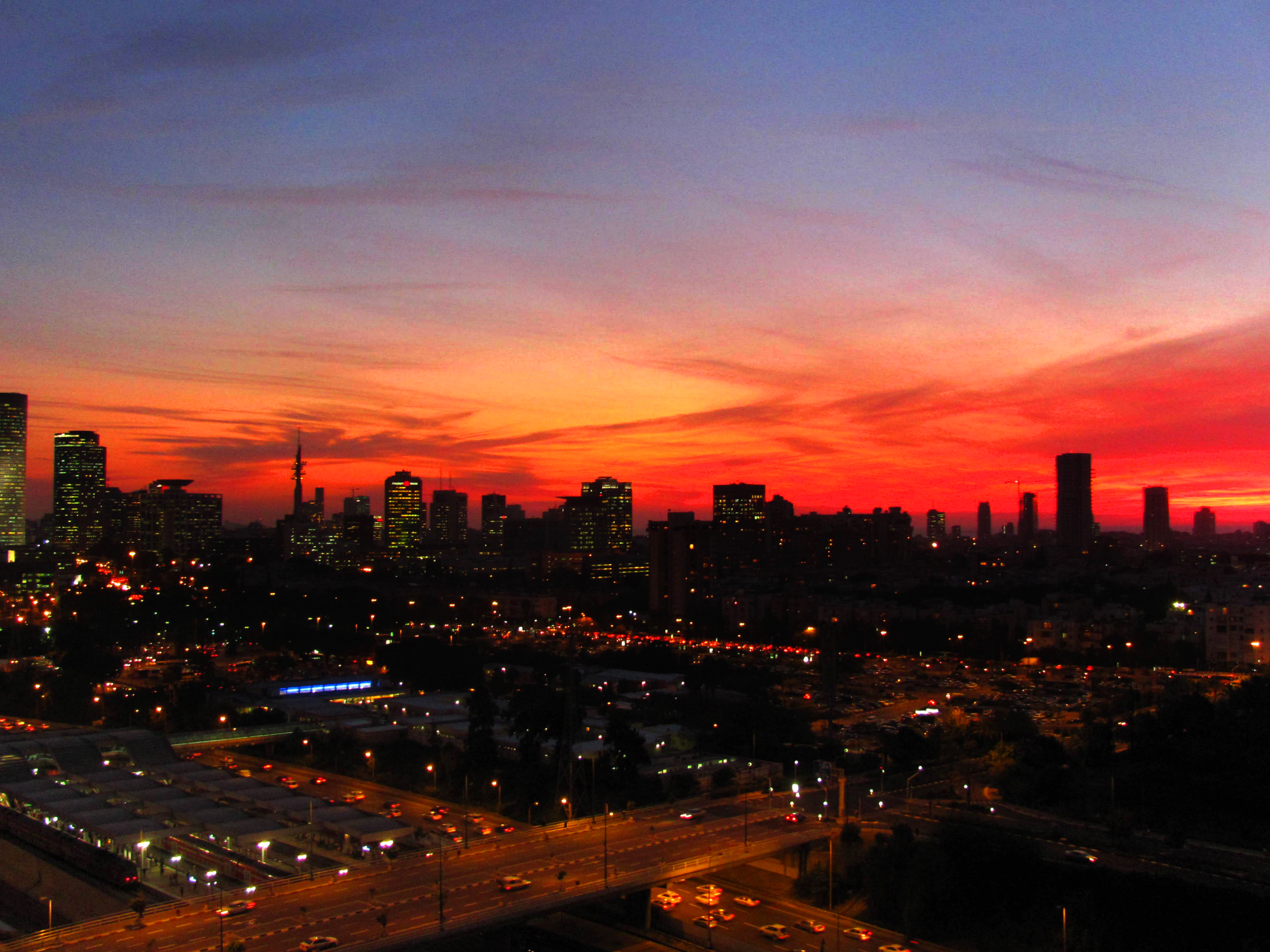
Tel Aviv, the second-largest city in Israel

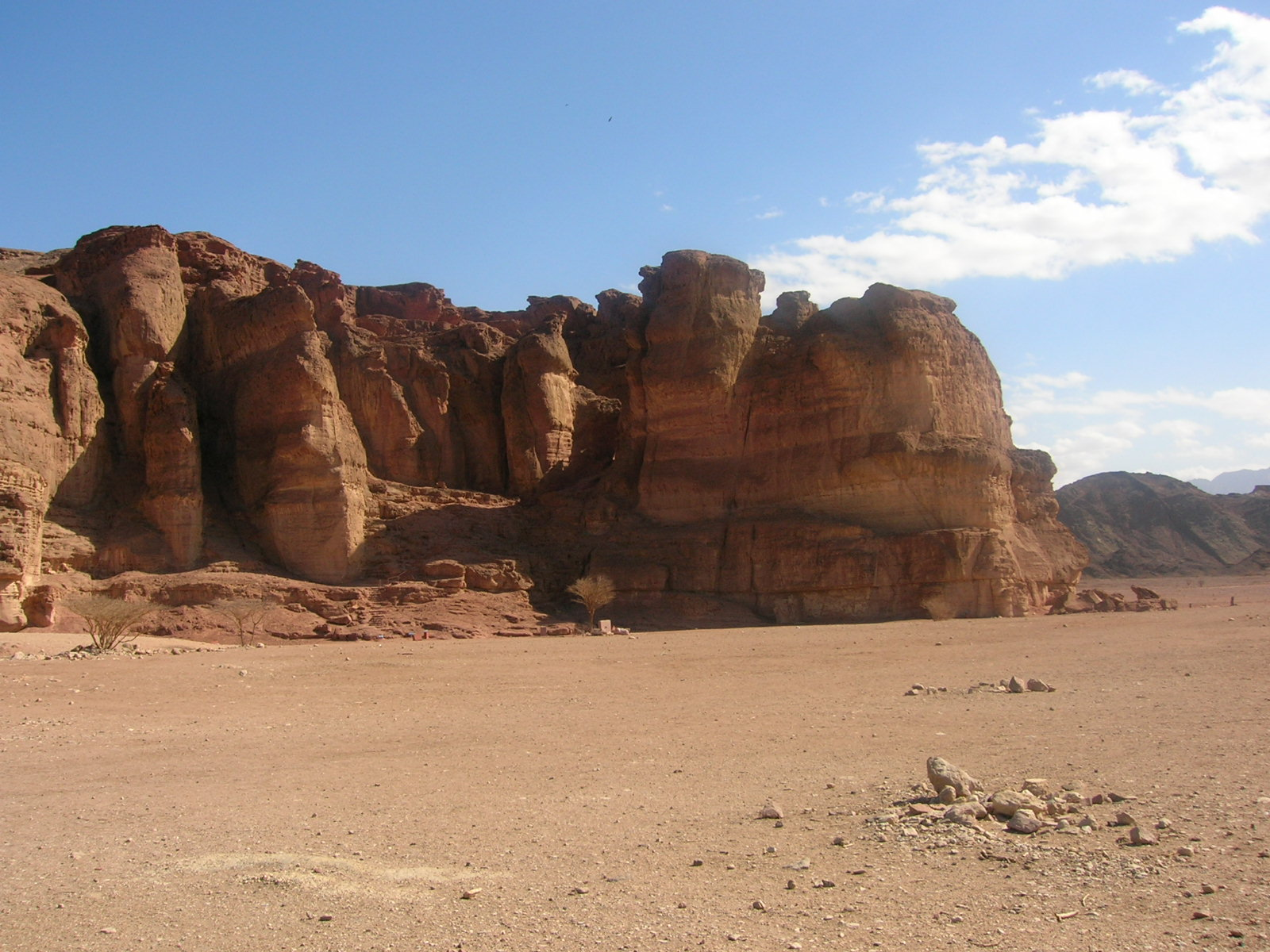
Timna Valley, in the southern Negev desert.

Tourism is a major economic sector and a significant source of income in Israel. Common tourist attractions include religious sites, beach resorts, natural sites, archaeological tourism, heritage tourism, adventure tourism, and ecotourism. Tourism in the Israeli-occupied West Bank and the Golan Heights is closely interconnected with the mass tourism in Israel. In 2019, Israel saw a record 4.55 million tourist arrivals, with tourism contributing NIS 20 billion to the national economy in 2017.

Jerusalem is a central destination for tourists, home to sites such as the Western Wall, the Church of the Holy Sepulchre, and the Dome of the Rock. The city also offers numerous cultural and historical attractions, including the Israel Museum and Yad Vashem. Tel Aviv is renowned for its lively nightlife, cultural festivals, and Mediterranean beaches, and the "White City" district, appealing to both local and international visitors. Other notable attractions include the Dead Sea, famous for its high salinity and therapeutic benefits, Haifa and its Baháʼí Gardens, and archaeological sites like Masada, Beit She'an and Caesarea. The Negev Desert offers natural tourism opportunities at locations such as Ramon Crater and Timna Valley, with activities including hiking, camel trekking, and stargazing, while Eilat's Coral Beach Nature Reserve, located in the Red Sea, attracts diving enthusiasts. The Galilee provides a variety of activities such as boating, cycling, and bird watching, alongside its religious sites. Israel has the highest number of museums per capita in the world with over 200 museums.

Religious tourism is very popular in Israel and in the West Bank. Over the millennia, the Holy Land has been amongst the most visited lands in the world. Many sites in modern Israel are considered holy in Christianity and Judaism due to their mention in the Hebrew Bible and the New Testament. As of 2007, the Western Wall and the Tomb of Rashbi were the most visited Jewish religious sites. The most visited Christian holy sites include the Church of the Holy Sepulchre in Jerusalem, the Church of the Nativity in Bethlehem, and the Basilica of the Annunciation in Nazareth. The most visited Islamic religious sites are the Temple Mount (Al-Aqsa Mosque) in Jerusalem and the Cave of the Patriarchs in Hebron.

In 2017, the most popular paid tourist attraction was Masada. The most visited city was Jerusalem and the most visited site was the Western Wall. The largest percentage of tourists came from the United States accounting for 19% of all tourists, followed by Russia, France, Germany, the United Kingdom, China, Italy, Poland, and Canada.

== Background ==
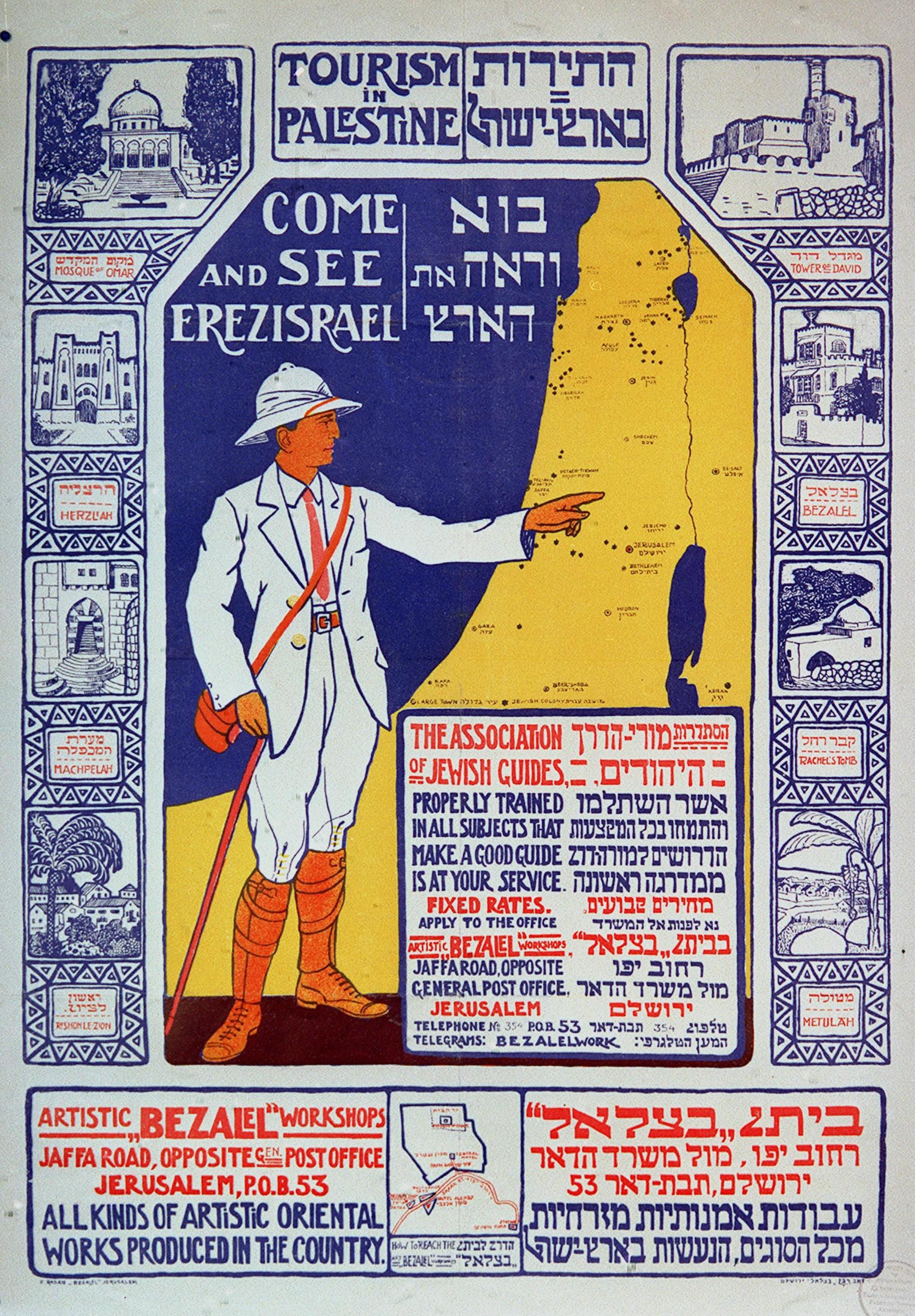
Poster promoting tourism in Palestine, 1940s.

During Ottoman rule of the Holy Land, there was frequent travel from Mediterranean countries to the Holy Land despite wars between the Ottoman Empire and Christian states of the region. By the early modern period, people considered of lower social class were making pilgrimages to the Holy Land as well.

Tourism to the Holy Land was mostly of religious nature until the 19th century, consisting of pilgrimages, with multiple monasteries and hospices hosting the pilgrims. In the 19th century, popular tourism began to reach the region with the advent of package tours by Thomas Cook and Son. Cook's company arrange travel for 12,000 people, among them Germany's Kaiser Wilhelm II. With European powers taking more interest in the Holy Land by the second half of the 19th century, there was an increase in travel from Europe and the United States (a notable example is Mark Twain's tour of the Holy Land). In the 20th century mass tourism to Israel began.

== Most-visited cities ==
=== Jerusalem ===
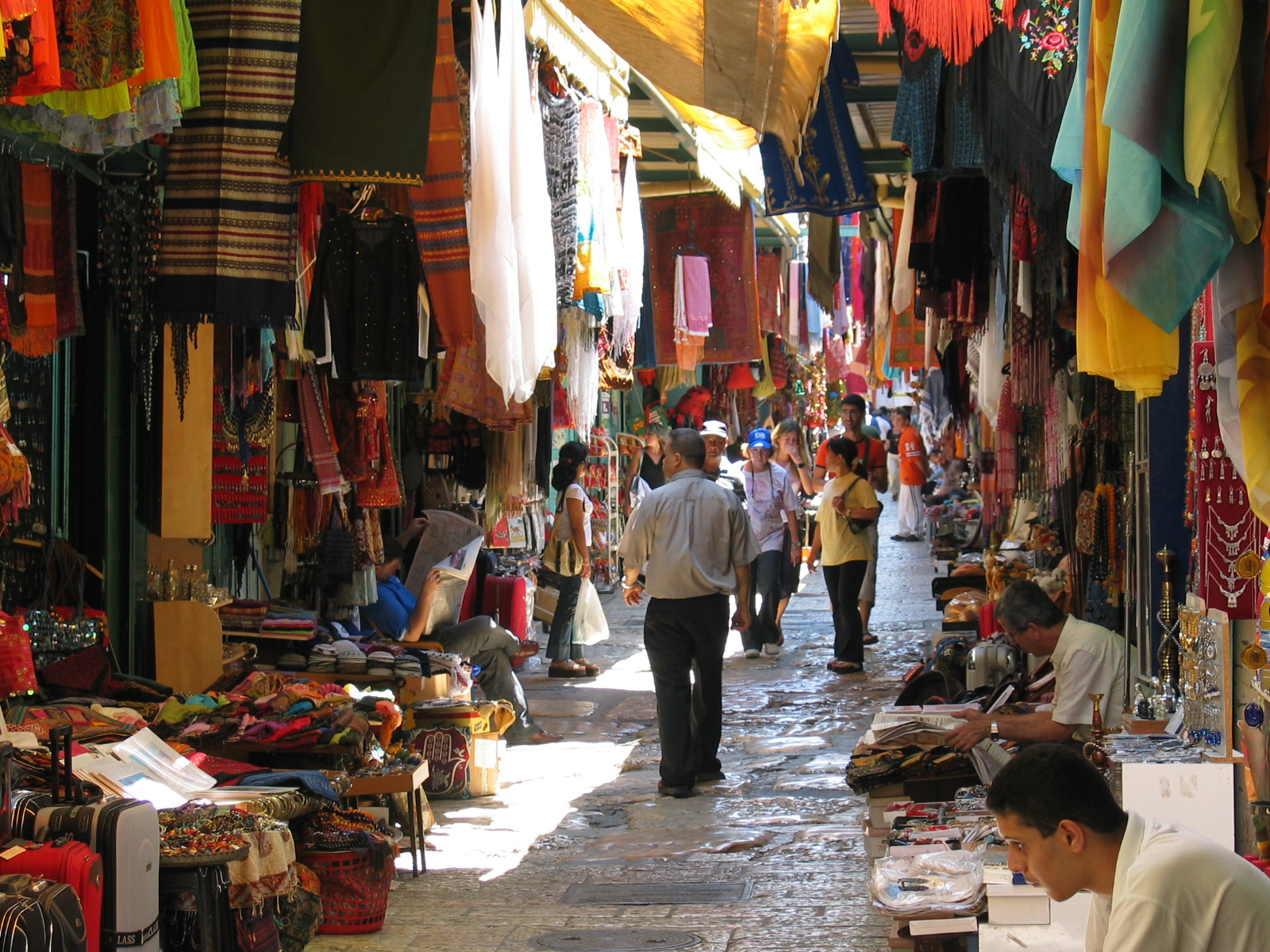
Arab market. Old City of Jerusalem

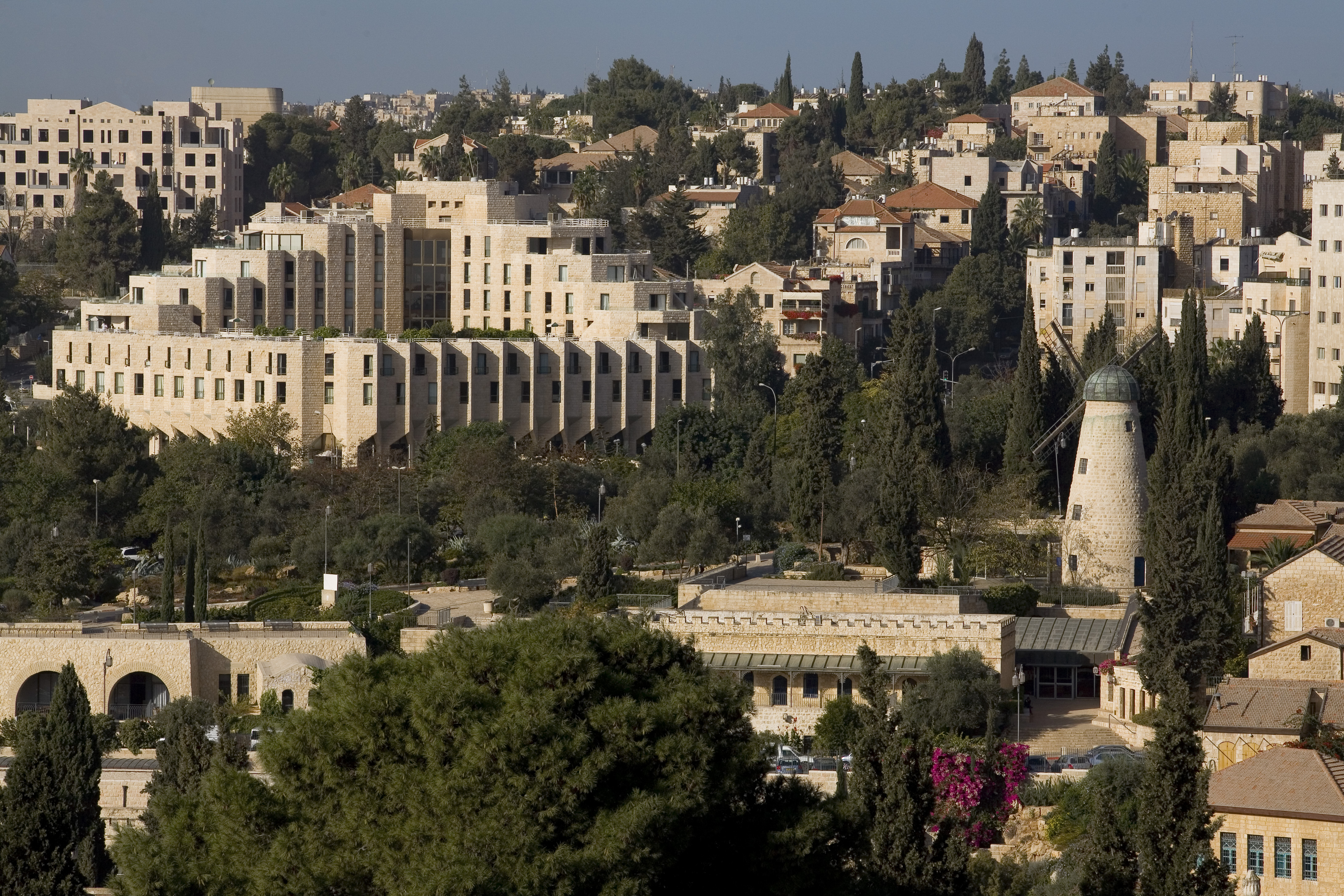
Western Jerusalem

Jerusalem is the most-visited city with 3.5 million tourist arrivals annually as of 2017. One of the oldest cities in the world, it is the proclaimed capital of, (Note: Jerusalem is the capital under Israeli law. The presidential residence, government offices, supreme court and parliament (Knesset) are located there. The Palestinian Authority foresees East Jerusalem as the capital of its future state. The United Nations and most countries do not recognize Jerusalem as Israel's capital, taking the position that the final status of Jerusalem is pending future negotiations between Israel and the Palestinian Authority. Most countries maintain their embassies in Tel Aviv and its suburbs or suburbs of Jerusalem, such as Mevaseret Zion (see CIA Factbook and this map of Israel (319 KB)) See Positions on Jerusalem for more information.) and largest city of Israel, if the area and population of Israeli-occupied East Jerusalem are included. It is a holy city to the three major Abrahamic religions – Judaism, Christianity, and Islam – and hosts many historical, archaeological, religious and other attractions.

West Jerusalem was built starting in the 1800s with the expansion beyond the Old City walls, gradually expanded throughout the British Mandate, and continued after the creation of Israel in 1948. Selected tourist attractions in this area are:

- The German Colony, a Temple Society settlement, with a colorful mix of architectural styles.
- Mea Shearim, established in the nineteenth century and inhabited largely by ultra-Orthodox Haredi Jews, retains the flavor of an Eastern
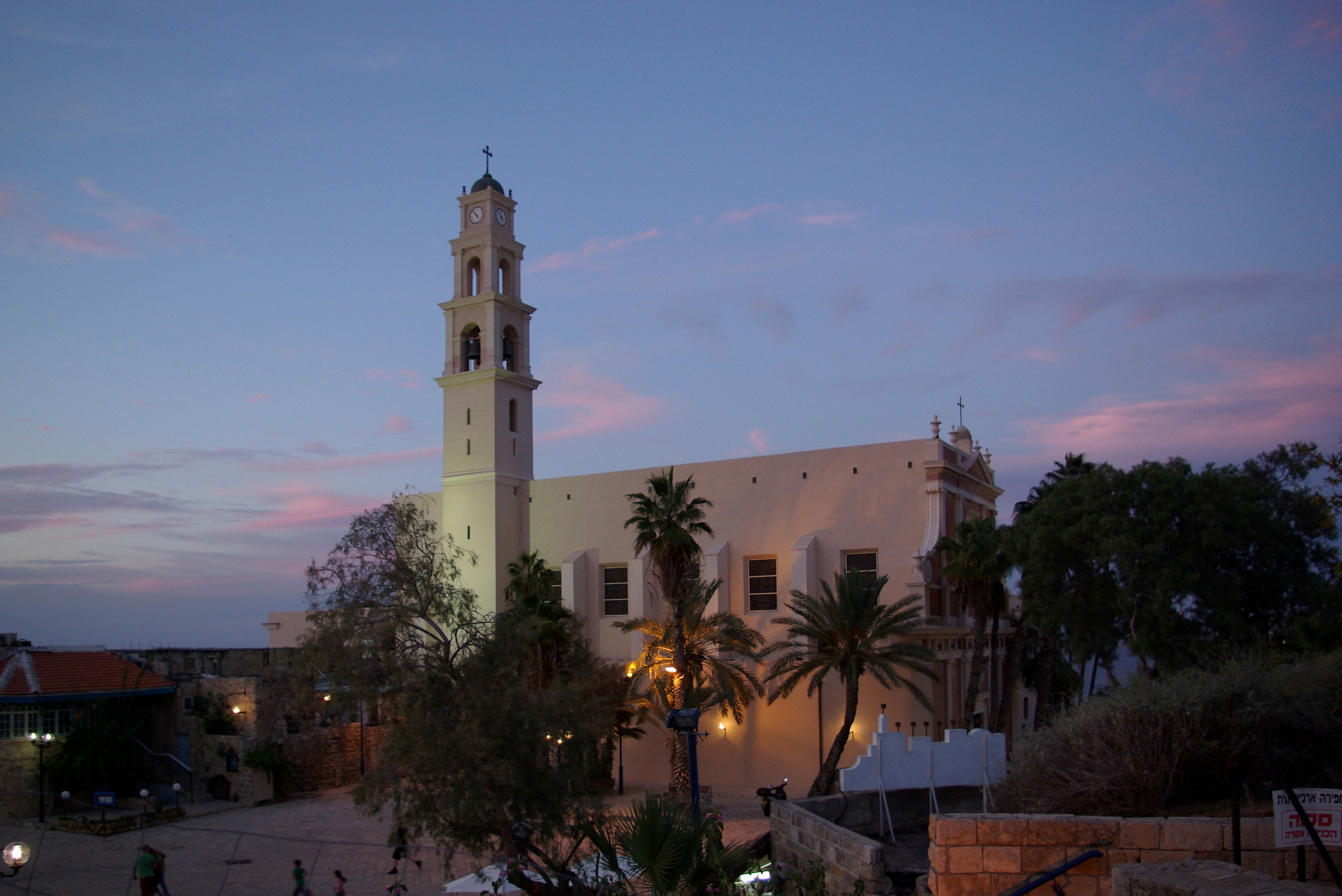
  St. Peter's Church, Jaffa
  European shtetl.
- Yad Vashem Holocaust memorial museum.
- Ein Karem, the traditional birthplace of John the Baptist, is one of the four most-visited Christian pilgrimage sites in Israel.
- Mount Zion, the traditional resting place of King David.
- Mount Scopus, site of the Hebrew University and standing at 2710 feet or 826 meters above sea level, offers a panoramic view of the city. Both the Temple Mount and the Dead Sea are visible from this location.

East Jerusalem was captured by Israel in the 1967 Six-Day War and considered by the international community as Palestinian territory held under Israeli occupation, although it was effectively unilaterally annexed in 1980 under the Jerusalem Law. It is the location of:

- The Old City of Jerusalem, traditionally divided into four parts: the Armenian, Christian, Muslim and Jewish Quarters. Notably, it contains the Temple Mount (known in Arabic as Haram ash-sharīf, the Noble Sanctuary), site of the ancient Temple in Jerusalem with only the Western Wall at its foot remaining, and now with the Dome of the Rock and Al-Aqsa Mosque.
- The Mount of Olives and Kidron Valley: with its lookout point, Tomb of Absalom, and other Jewish tombs and burial grounds dating back 3,000 years, and Christian sites such as Gethsemane, the Church of All Nations, Dominus Flevit, and the Church of Maria Magdalene (Russian Orthodox Church). Various locations have been proposed as the Tomb of Jesus and/or as Golgotha, the nearby hill where he was crucified. Traditionally both have been believed to be in the vicinity where the Church of the Holy Sepulchre stands. Immediately south of the Jewish Quarter lies the City of David with archaeological digs including the Siloam Tunnel.

The controversial status of East Jerusalem has been an issue when attempting to market Jerusalem to international tourists. In 2009, 2010, and again in 2015, the UK Advertising Standards Authority ruled against a series of Israeli Ministry of Tourism advertising campaigns that displayed images and information about tourist sites located in East Jerusalem. The Authority wrote in its ruling that "the status of the occupied territory of the West Bank was the subject of much international dispute, and because we considered that the ad implied that the part of East Jerusalem featured in the image was part of the state of Israel, we concluded that the ad was likely to mislead." Israel rejected the ruling, with the Ministry of Tourism releasing a statement that said the ad provided "basic, accurate information to a prospective UK visitor". The ruling from 2009 also included criticism about Gaza, the West Bank and the Golan Heights being shown as part of Israel.

=== Tel Aviv ===
- With 2.3 million tourist visits in 2013, Tel Aviv is Israel's second-largest city and a cosmopolitan, cultural and financial global city. The city's greater area is the largest with 3 million inhabitants. Tel Aviv exhibits a UNESCO world heritage area of Bauhaus architecture. The nearby historical city of Jaffa is experiencing a tourism boom. In 2010, National Geographic ranked Tel Aviv as one of the world's ten best beach cities.
- Tel Aviv is called the "city that never sleeps" by the locals because of its vibrant nightlife scene. Tel Aviv was named "the gay capital of the Middle East" by the Out magazine.

=== Safed ===
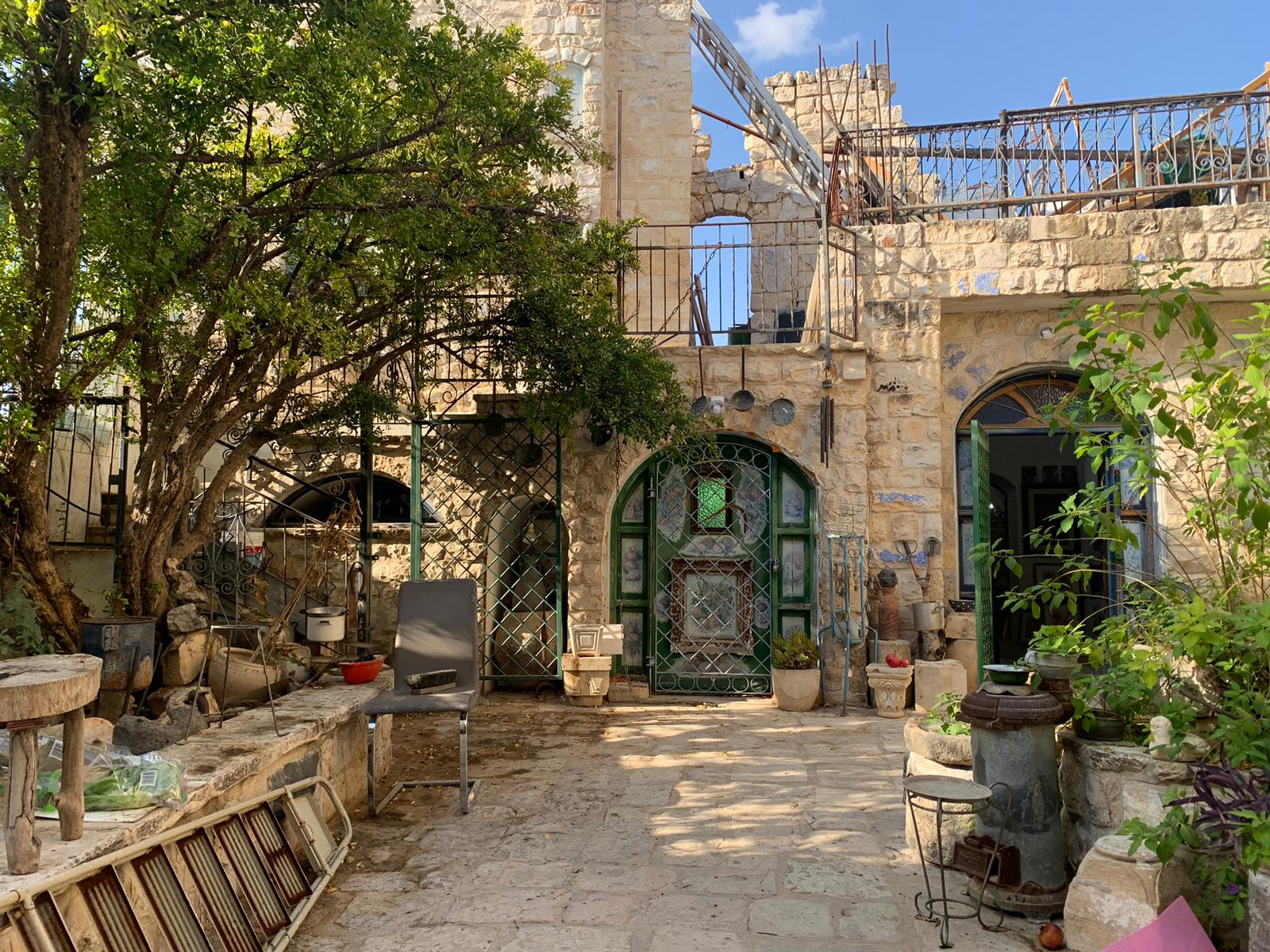
A courtyard in Beit Castel, in the Artists' quarter of Safed.

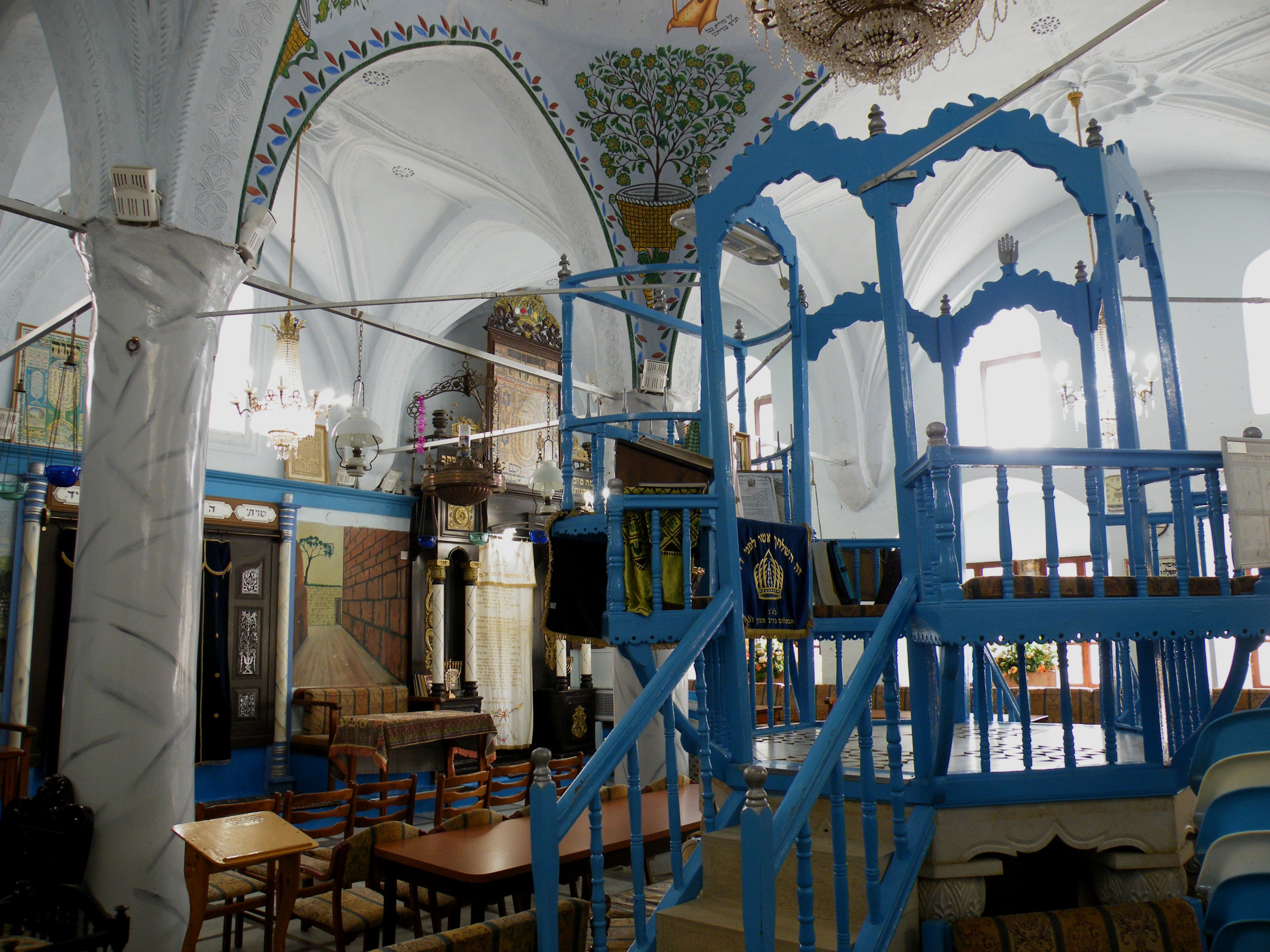
Inside of the Abuhav Synagogue.

- Safed is one of the four holy cities in Judaism, where the study of kabbalah (Jewish mysticism) developed. Famous for its artisans. The grave of Rabbi Shimon bar Yochai is in nearby Meron.
- Safed hosts the Artists quarter of Safed. The first artist to arrive in Safed was Yitzhak Frenkel in 1920, following him arrived several of his students, leading to the establishment of an artists quarter. The city today still hosts multiple galleries and museums including the Beit Castel Gallery, the Frenkel Frenel Museum, the HaMe'eri museum and others.
- Safed has several ashkenazi and sepheradic synagogues, including the HaAri synagogue, Abuhav synagogue and others. The synagogues as well as Safed's surrounding landscapes were major themes of the Safed artists.

Around the city, there are many nature reserves and archaeological sites notably the ancient synagogues.

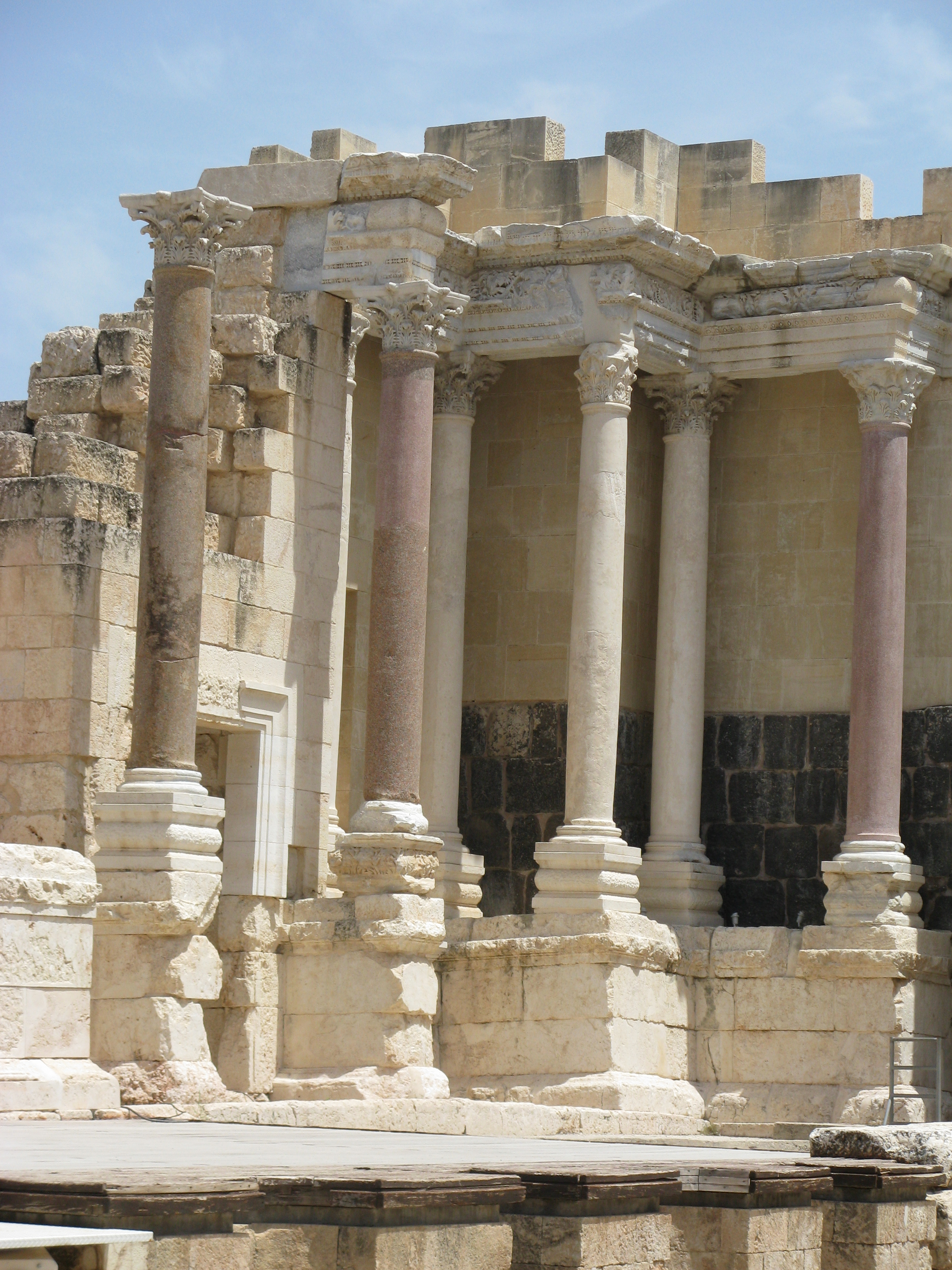
Ruins of Scythopolis, Beit Shean

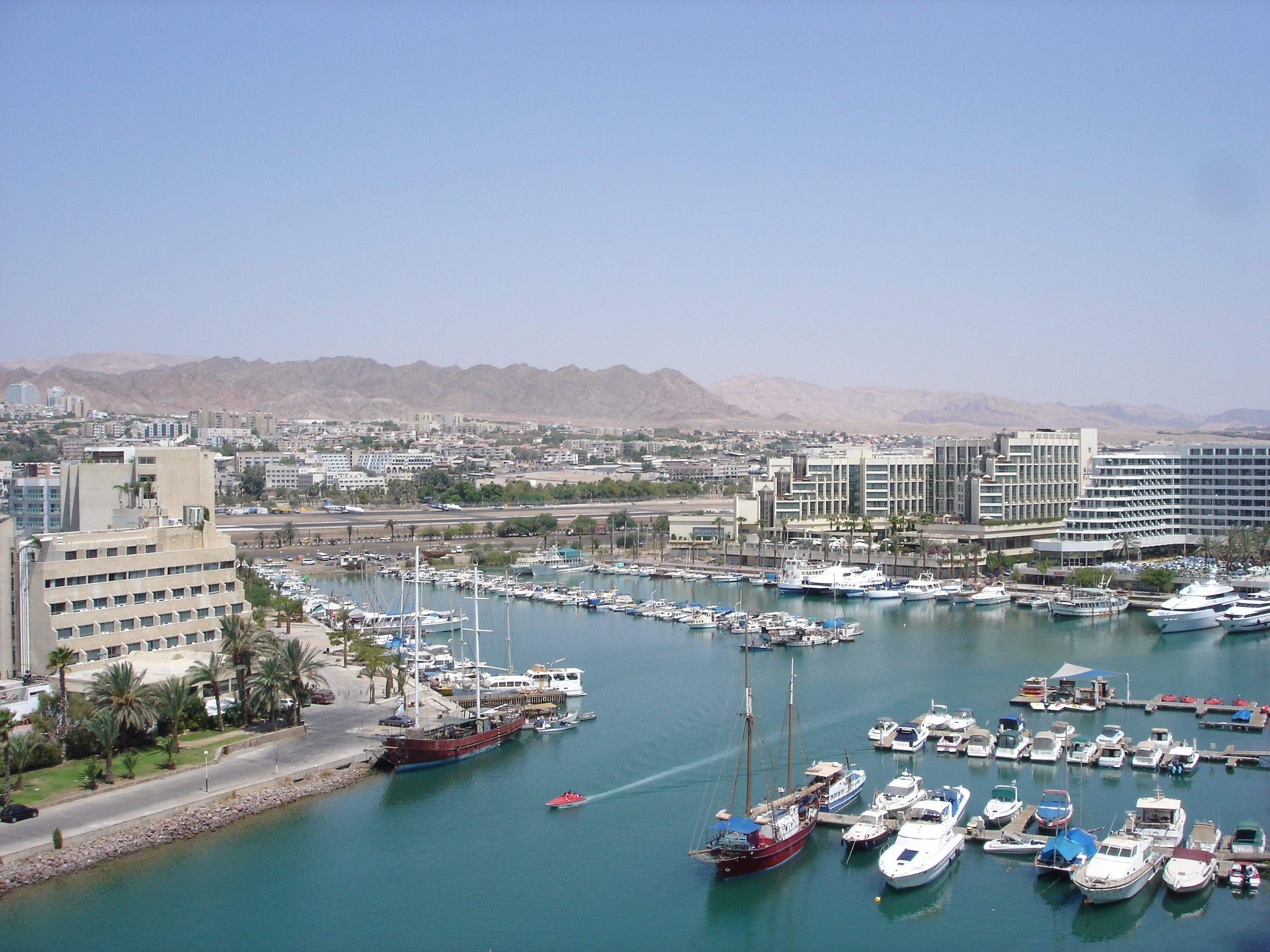
Eilat seaside resort on the Red Sea

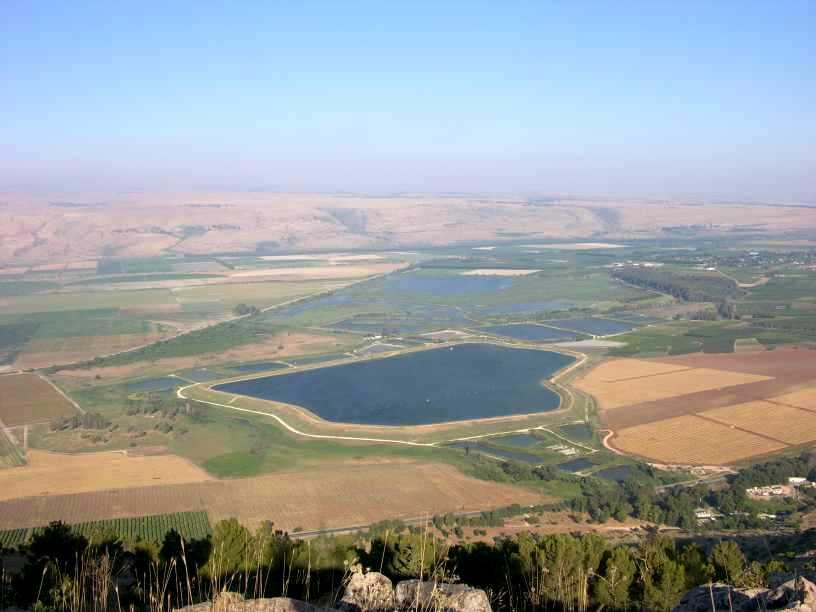
Hula Valley in northern Israel

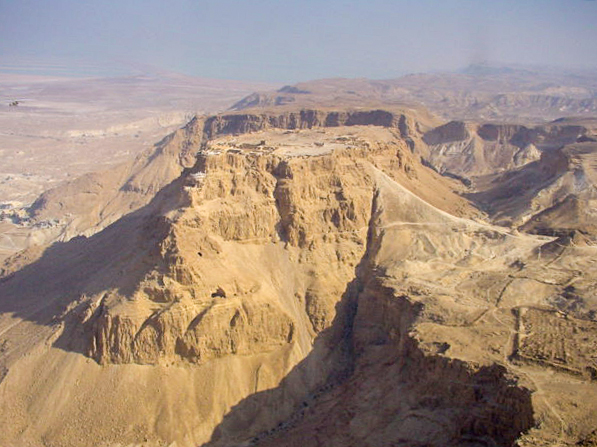
Masada

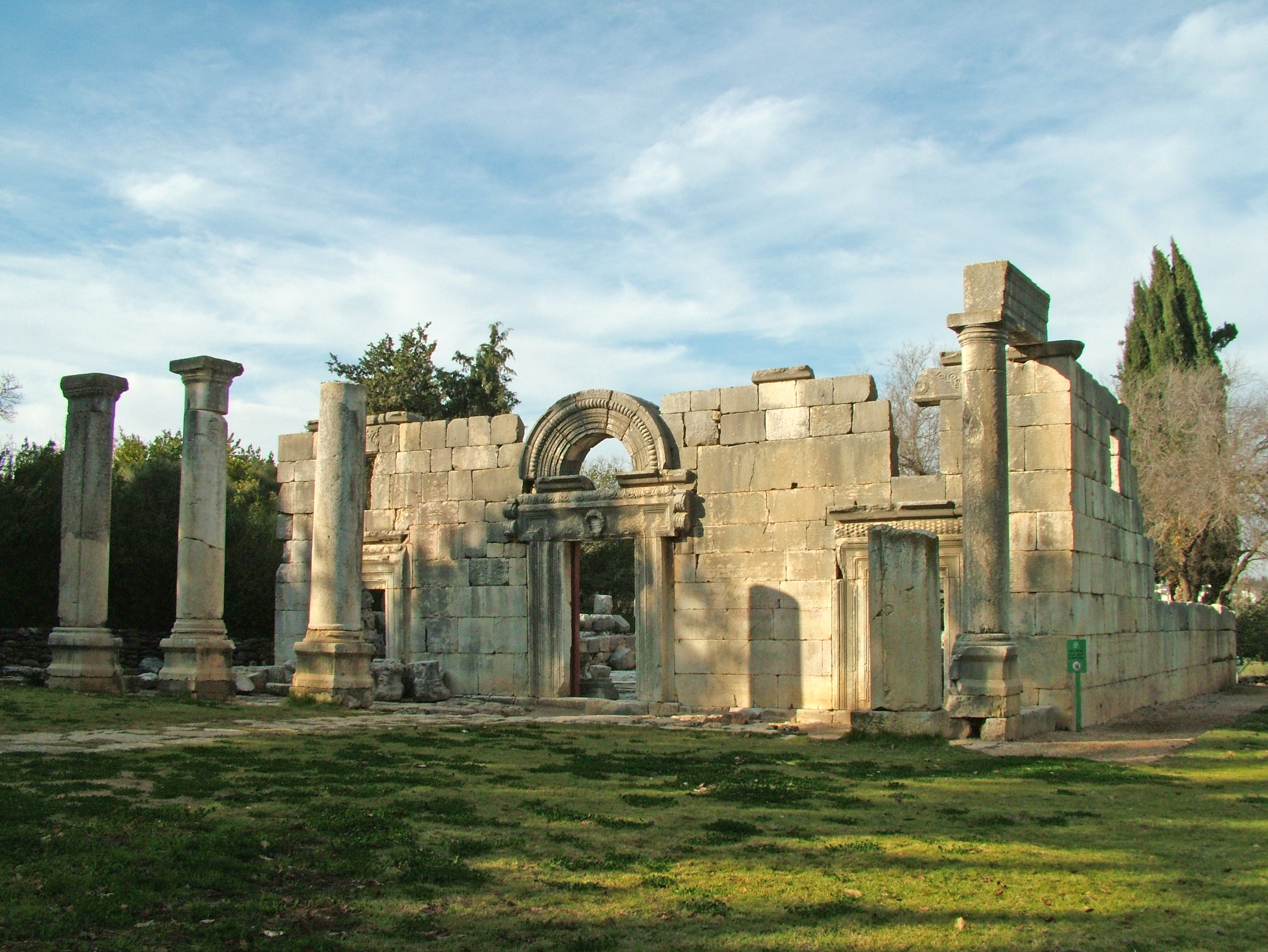
Ancient Synagogue at Bar'am National Park

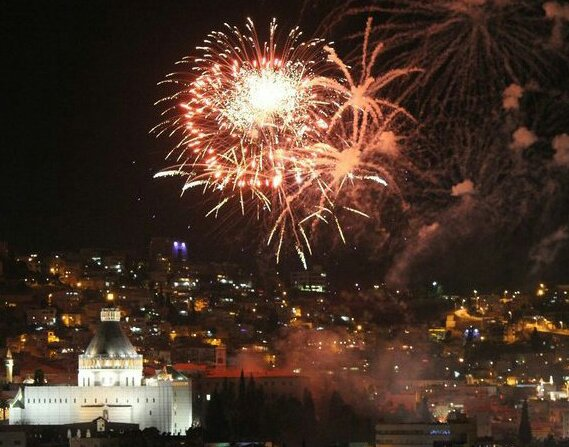
Christmas Eve in Nazareth

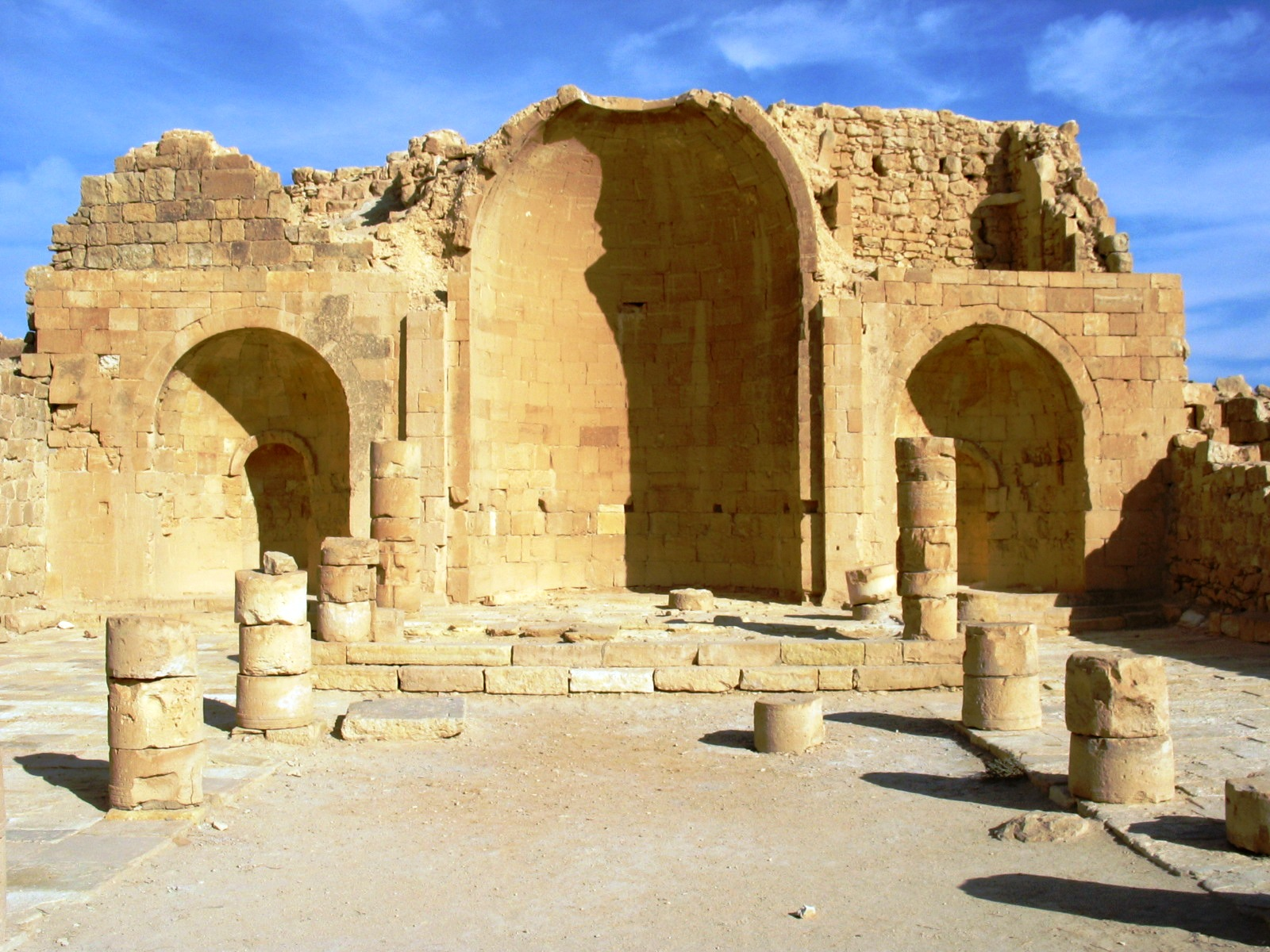
Shivta National Park, (World Heritage Site)

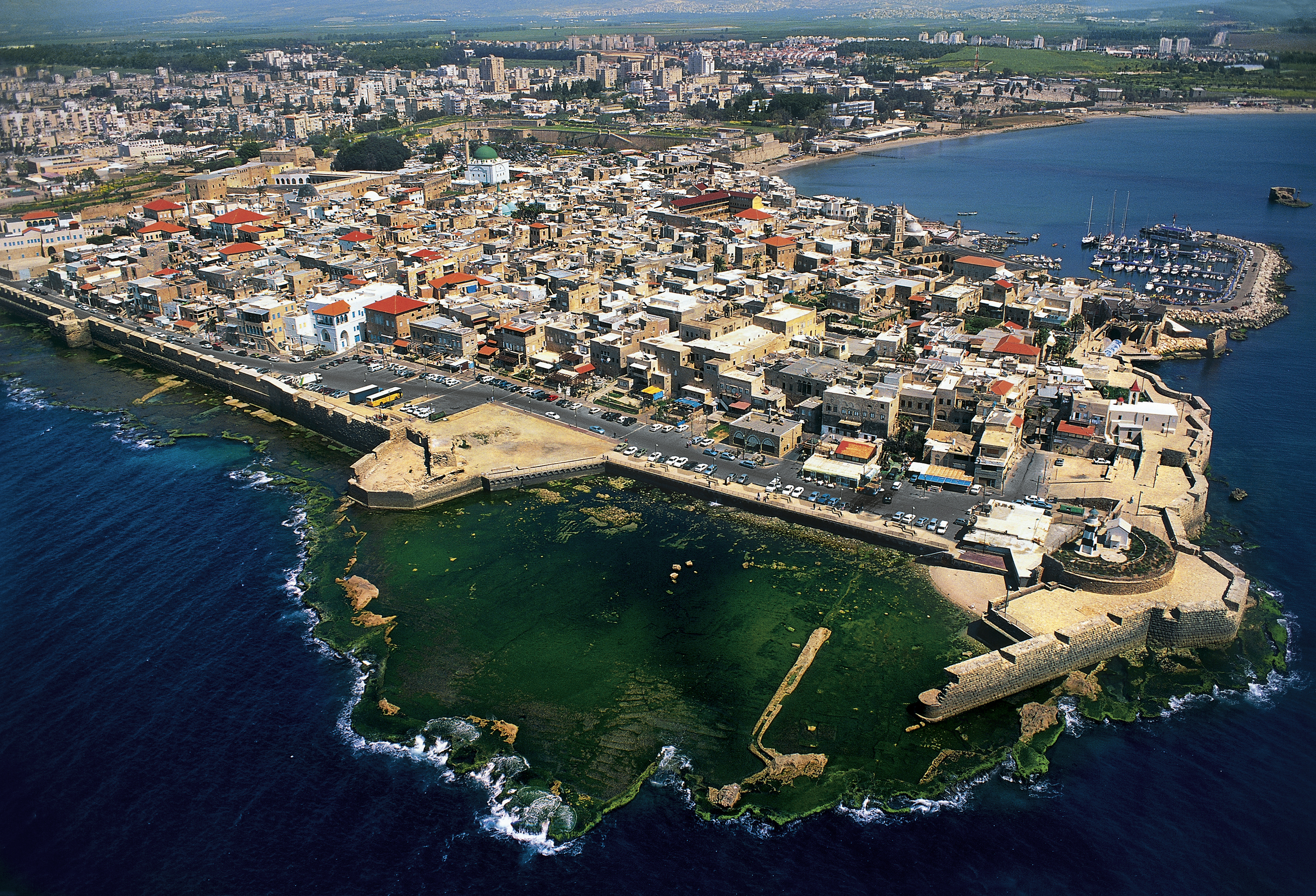
Old City of Acre

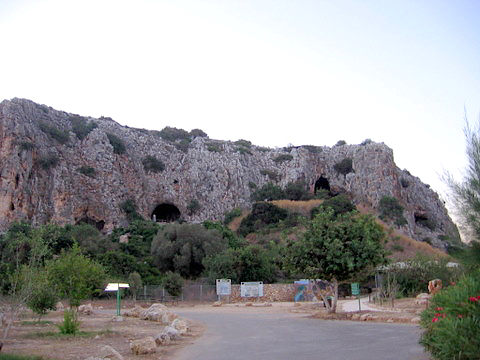
Nahal Me'arot prehistoric caves, Mount Carmel

=== Acre (Akko) ===
- Old City and its Knights Hall
- El-Jazzar Mosque
- (Baháʼí) Shrine of Bahá'u'lláh, resting place of Bahá'u'lláh as well as a Unesco world heritage historical town.

=== Haifa ===
- Haifa is Israel's third largest city and a mixed city of various religious denominations. It hosts the Baháʼí World Centre, a UNESCO world heritage site. Haifa is made up of several neighborhoods with its urban core composed of Hadar HaCarmel and Haifa port downtown area.
- Carmel
- (Baháʼí) Shrine of the Báb, its terraces, and the Baháʼí World Centre and the buildings (a Unesco world heritage).
- Stella Maris Monastery
- Tel Shikmona
- Cave of Elijah
- Mahmood Mosque
- Haifa hosts the University of Haifa as well as the Technion – Israel Institute of Technology.

=== Tiberias ===
Tiberias is one of the four holy cities in Judaism, overlooking the Sea of Galilee.

- Saint Peter's house at Capernaum, Tabgha and the Mount of Beatitudes.

=== Nazareth ===
- Nazareth is known as the 'Arab capital of Israel'.
- Visit Nazareth's old city and historical sites around the city
- Jesus's hometown and the site of many of his reported acts and miracles.
- Many churches, including The Church of the Annunciation, the largest church building in the Middle East. In Roman Catholic tradition, it marks the site where the Archangel Gabriel announced the future birth of Jesus to the Virgin Mary (Luke 1:26–31).
- Starting point for the Jesus Trail, a network of hiking routes connecting many sites from Jesus's life and ministry.

=== Beersheba ===
- Settlement of Beersheba attributed to the patriarch Abraham. Regional capital of the Negev desert. It serves as a starting point for exploring such sites as the Ramon Crater or the UNESCO world heritage Nabataean Incense Route (Shivta, Avdat, Mamshit).

=== Eilat ===
- Eilat, Israel's southernmost city, located on the Red Sea coast, is a hot, sunny year-round travel destination. Popular destination for skin and scuba diving, with equipment for hire on or near all major beaches, the Eilat Mountains are similar to those in Sinai and there are trail roads for hiking, where one can also find animals like dorcas gazelle, rock hyrax, striped hyena and Nubian ibex. Eilat has big hotels and various attractions such as camel riding, and the Eilat's Underwater Observatory Marine Park.
- Ramon Airport opened in 2019 replacing the previous Eilat Airport and Ovda Airport. It is Israel's second busiest airport and served by a number of direct flights to and from Europe.

=== Ashkelon ===
- Ashkelon is a city between Gaza City in the Gaza Strip and Ashdod. The city offers many hotels and Mizrahi Jewish restaurants. Local drink Arak Ashkelon is also popular among tourists.
- Tel Ashkelon is a big archaeological site, includes ruins from many different periods such as Canaanites, Philistines, Persians, Phoenicians, Greeks, Romans, Byzantines, Muslims and Crusaders.
- Ashkelon has no active pilgrimage site but it was one of the places where the head of Husayn ibn Ali before transferred to Cairo was located, the mosque was destroyed in 1950 but in 2001 a small compound built on the site for Shia Islam pilgrims from India who visiting the site, there is also a well believed by Muslims and Christians alike which is one of Abraham's wells.
- The sand dunes between Ashkelon to Ashdod and between Ashkelon to the Gaza Strip are popular attractions on this area of the sea coast.

== Landmarks outside cities ==
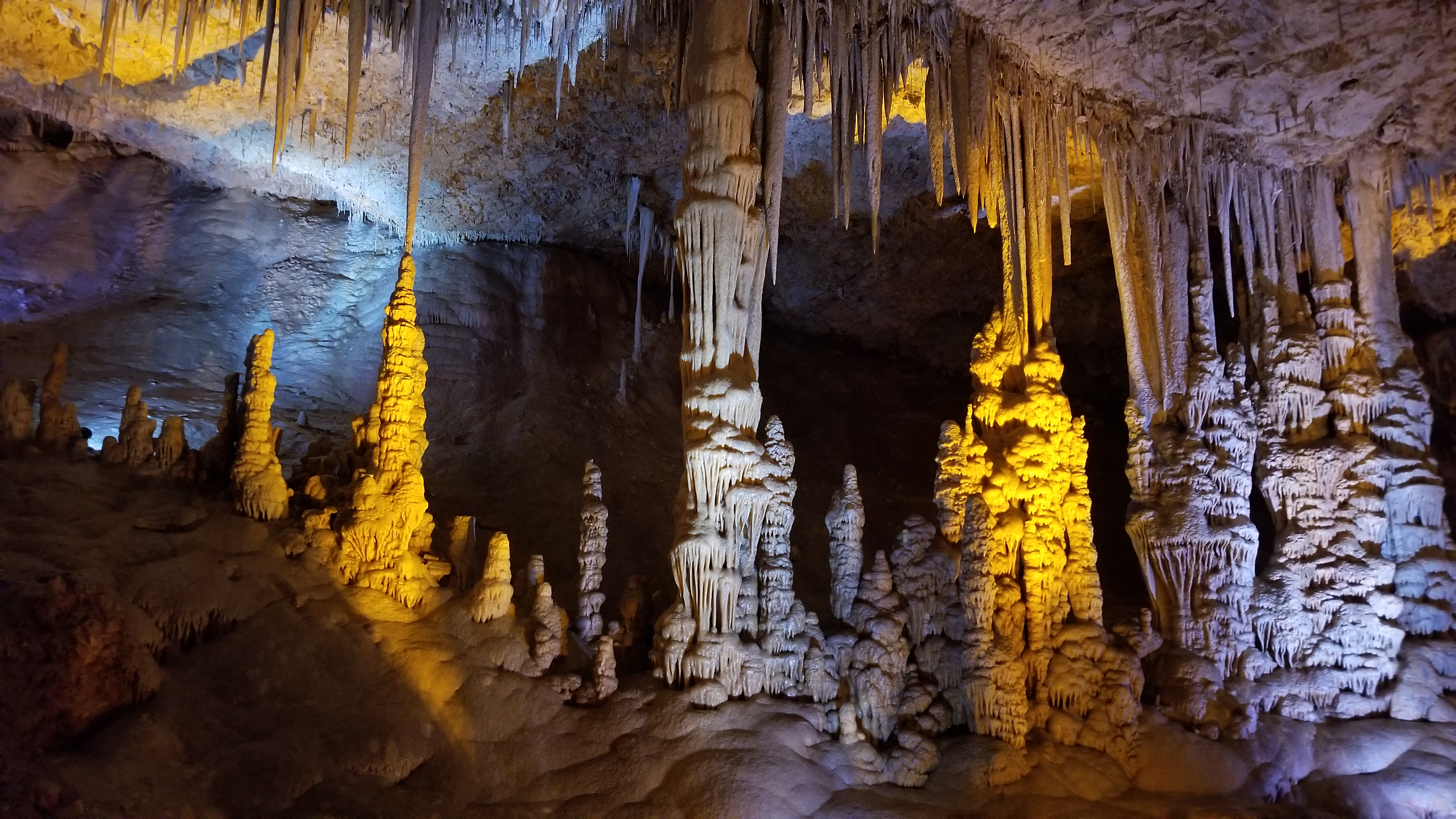
Avshalom Cave, Soreq

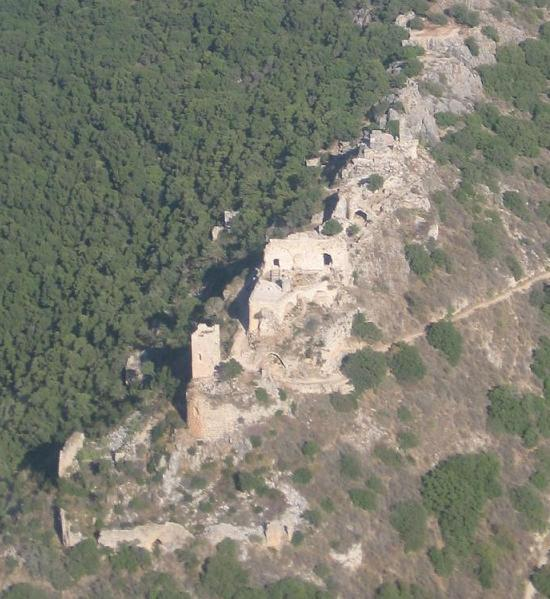
Montfort Castle, Upper Galilee

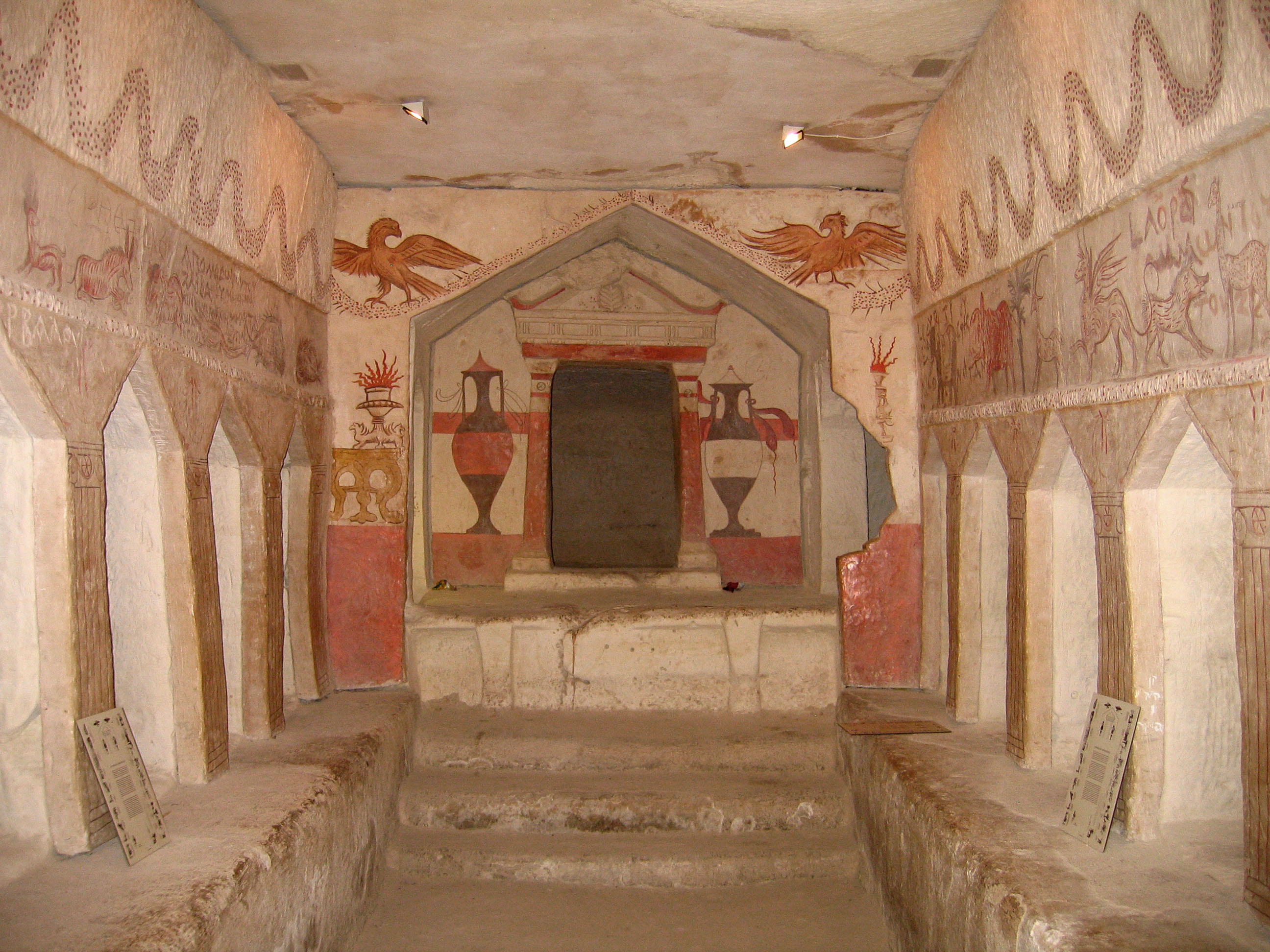
The Sidonian Tomb at Beit Guvrin-Maresha National Park

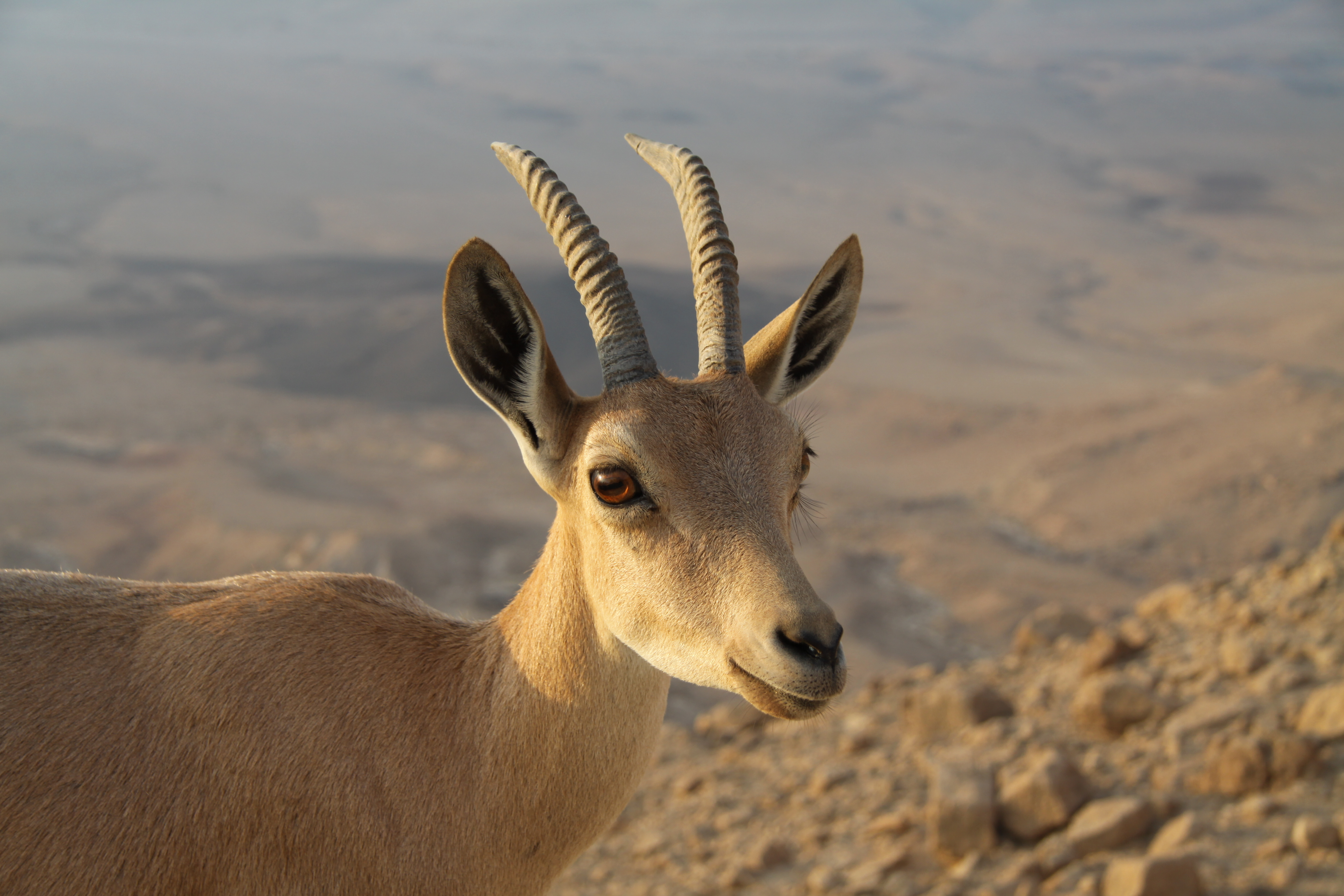
Nubian ibex in Makhtesh Ramon, Negev

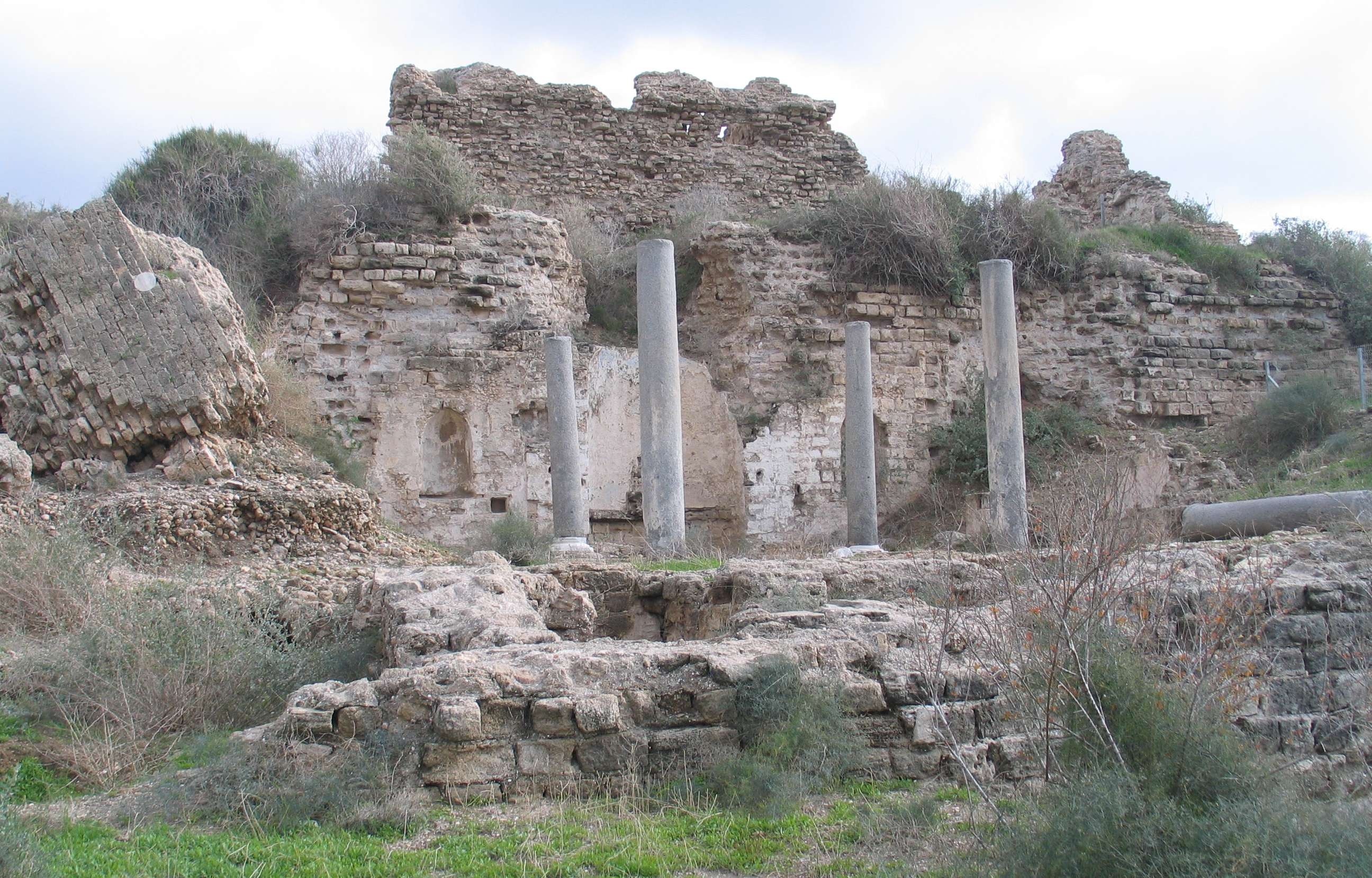
Byzantine Church ruins at Ashkelon National Park

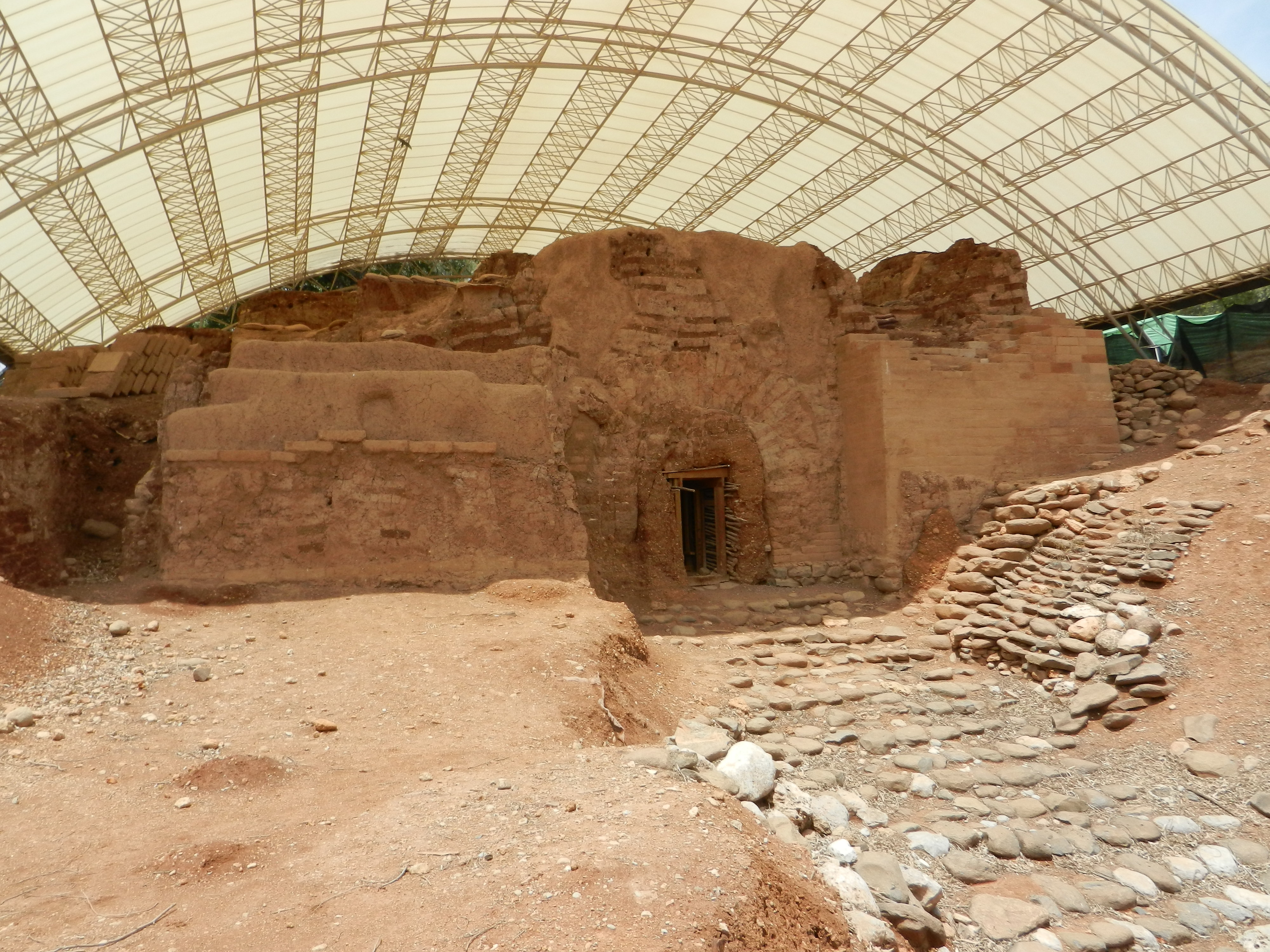
Tel Dan Canaanite Gate

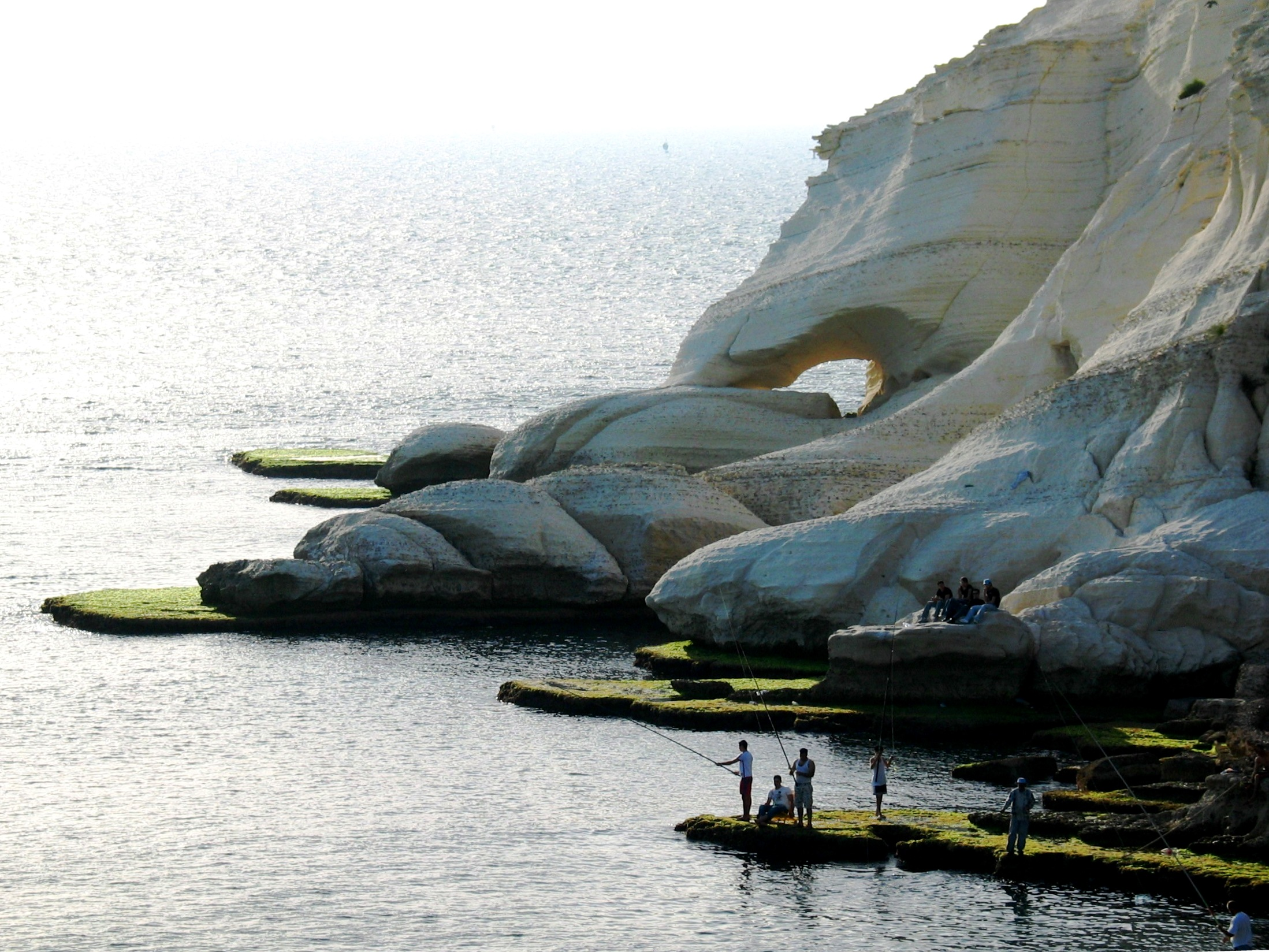
Rosh HaNikra grottoes near the Israeli-Lebanese border crossing

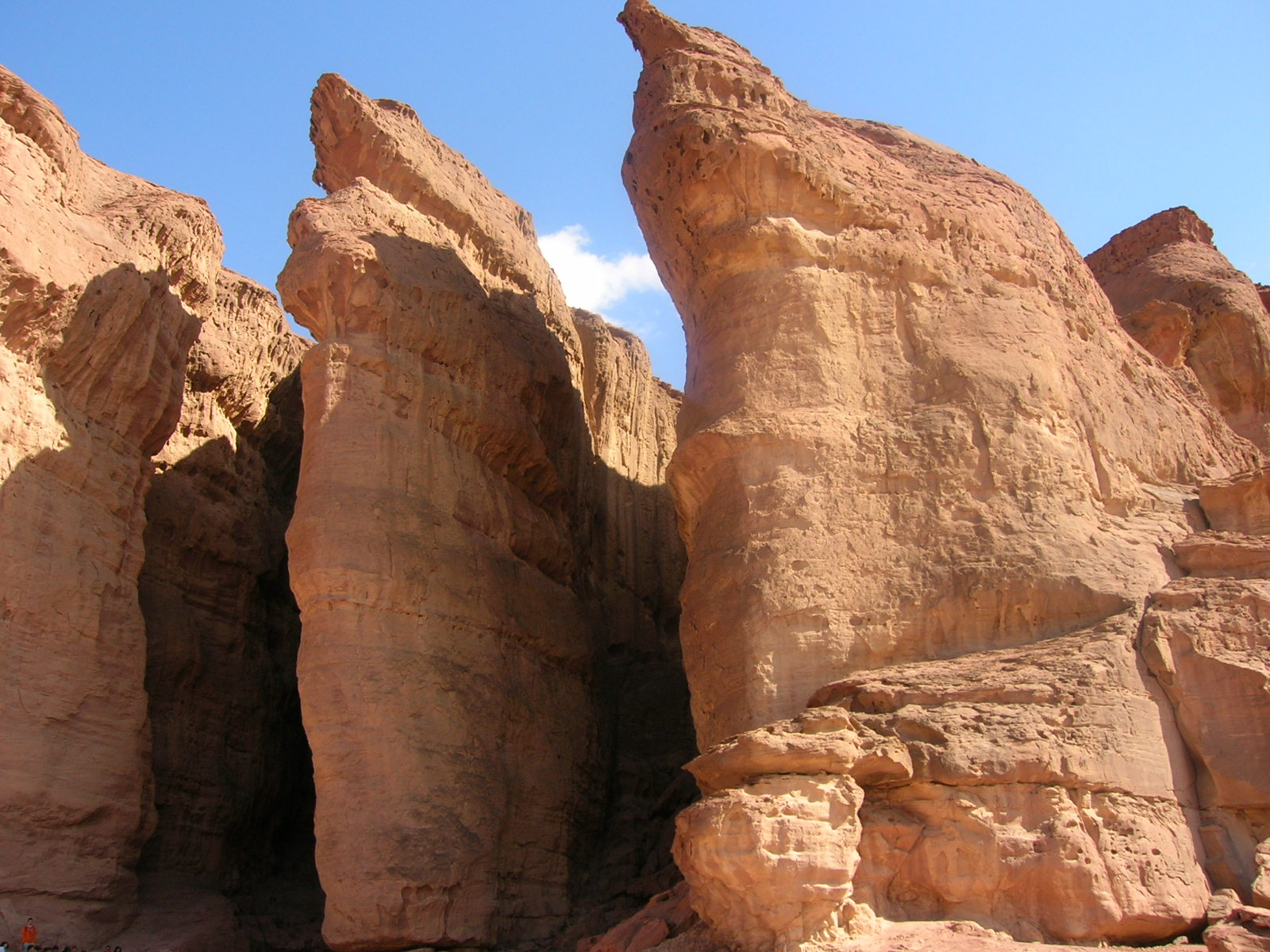
Solomon pillars at the Timna Valley

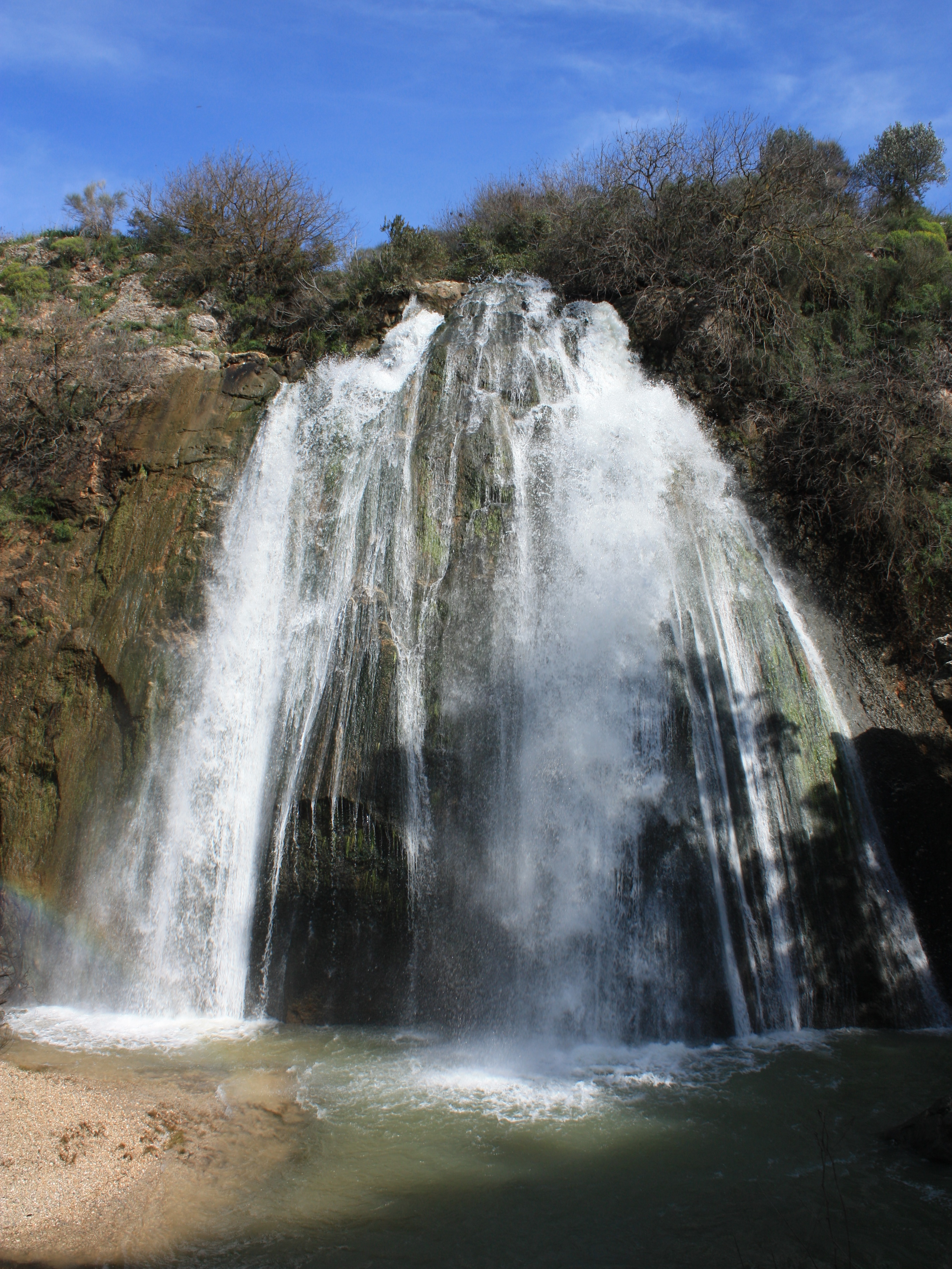
Nahal Ayun waterfalls

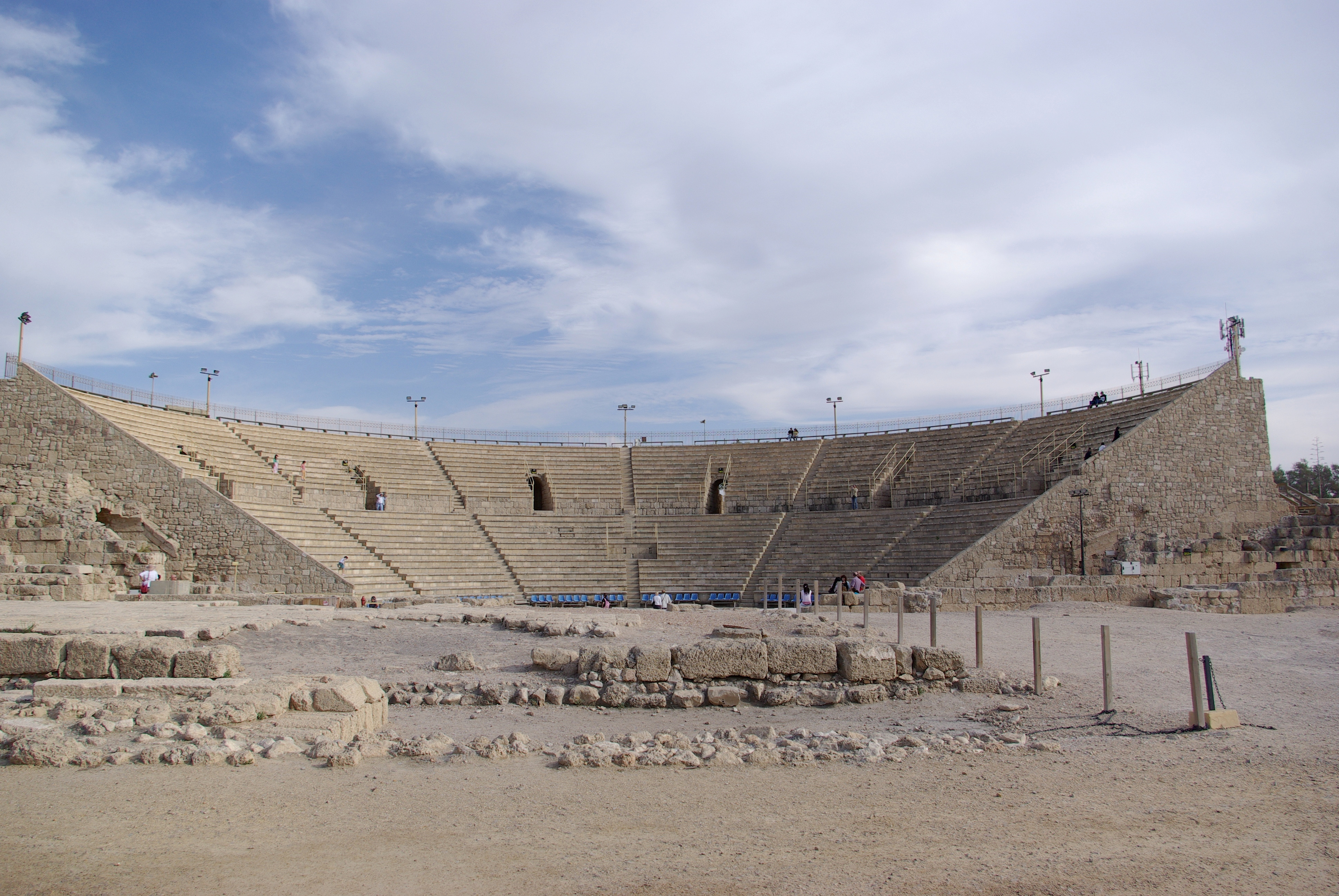
Caesarea Maritima

=== Masada ===
Masada is an ancient fortification in the Southern District of Israel situated on top of an isolated rock plateau (akin to a mesa) on the eastern edge of the Judaean Desert, overlooking the Dead Sea. Herod the Great built palaces for himself on the mountain and fortified Masada between 37 and 31 BCE. According to Josephus, the Siege of Masada by troops of the Roman Empire towards the end of the First Jewish–Roman War ended in the mass suicide of the 960 Jewish rebels and their families hiding there. Masada is located 20 kilometres (12 miles) east of Arad. Masada is a UNESCO World Heritage Site and Israel's most popular tourist attraction only second to Jerusalem.

=== Caesarea ===
Caesarea's ancient city includes Roman and Crusader ruins, such as the amphitheater and hippodrome, where live concerts of classical and popular music are frequently held, as well as the harbor from which St. Paul was taken as a prisoner to Rome. It is one of Israel's biggest archaeological sites.

=== Beit She'an ===
Beit She'an (Scythopolis) was a Roman Decapolis city. One of the largest archaeological sites in the Middle East.

=== Beit She'arim ===
Beit She'arim National Park was an ancient Jewish Necropolis, it is having many tombs of Jews with many significant signs like animals and menorah, it is also includes a Jewish city and an ancient synagogue ruins.

=== Biblical tells ===
There are around 200 biblical Tells in Israel. Tel is an archaeological site that is not created by nature but by ruined human settlements. The biblical tells are from the Bronze Age and located on ancient cities that are mentioned in old testament. the chosen cities are Tel Hazor, Tel Megiddo and Tel Be'er Sheva which are also UNESCO World Heritage Sites. These tels also have some of the most ancient water systems in the world. Other biblical tells around Israel include Jerusalem, Tel Arad, Tel Gezer and Tel Lachish.

=== Mount Carmel caves ===
Sites of human evolution at Mount Carmel – Nahal Me'arot Nature Reserve is a site of human evolution at Mount Carmel in Haifa, Northern Israel. It has four caves such as Me’arat HaTanur (the Oven Cave; also known as Tabun Cave), Me’arat HaGamal (the Camel Cave), Me’arat HaNahal (the Stream Cave) and Me’arat HaGedi (the Young Goat Cave). The site was proclaimed as universal value by UNESCO in 2012.The site indicates the prehistoric man's settlements and unique evidence of a first burial.

=== Negev Incense Route ===
Incense Route – Desert Cities in the Negev – The Negev incense route located between Jordan's Petra and Gaza, the Nabataeans have built many fortresses, caravanserai but especially known for their four important cities of Avdat, Mamshit, Shivta, and Haluza that located on this important trade route, the Negev Incense Route is a UNESCO World Heritage Site.

=== Ancient synagogues ===
Israel is the birthplace of Judaism and cradle of Jewish history includes many ancient synagogues from the Second Temple Period and Byzantine-Muslim periods from Northern to Southern Israel. Among the more impressive synagogue remains are those from Capernaum, Magdala, Masada, Anim, Bar'am, Gush Halav, Beit Alpha, Hukok, Nabratein, Ein Gedi, Caesarea, and Hamat Tiberias.

Additional synagogues can be found in the Israeli-occupied territories of the West Bank, for example Susya and Herodium, and the Golan Heights, such as Gamla and Umm el Kanatir.

=== Muslim shrines ===
Next to the ancient city of Arsuf stands the Sidna Ali Mosque, which is still in use and holds the tomb of Muslim holy man. The Nabi Musa shrine, believed to be the tomb of Musa (Moses) according to a local Muslim tradition, is located near the West Bank city of Jericho.

=== Avshalom Stalactites Cave ===
Avshalom Cave, also known as Soreq Cave or Stalactites Cave, is a 5,000 m2 cave on the western side of Mt.Ye'ela, in the Judean hills, in Israel, unique for its dense concentration of stalactites Some of the stalactites found in the cave are four meters long, and some have been dated as 300,000 years old. Some meet stalagmites to form stone pillars

=== Mount Karkom ===
Har Karkom ("Mountain of Saffron" in Hebrew), or Jabal Ideid in Arabic is a mountain in the southwest Negev desert in Israel, halfway between Petra and Kadesh Barnea. On the basis that the Israelites travelled across the Sinai peninsula towards Petra in a fairly straight line, a number of scholars have contemplated the possibility of Har Karkom being the Biblical Mount Sinai. Following this theory, Emmanuel Anati excavated at the mountain, and discovered that it was a major paleolithic cult centre, with the surrounding plateau covered with shrines, altars, stone circles, stone pillars, and over 40,000 rock engravings.

Although, on the basis of his findings, Anati advocates the identification of Har Karkom with Mount Sinai,[1][2] the peak of religious activity at the site may date to 2350–2000 BC, and the mountain appears to have been abandoned perhaps between 1950 and 1000 BC; the exodus is sometimes dated between 1600 and 1200 BC. However, no archaeological evidence has been supported by scholars to maintain a date of 1600–1200 BC. Anati instead places the Exodus, based on other archaeological evidence at around 2300 BC

=== Ancient Ashkelon ===
- Tel Ashkelon is a large archaeological site, includes ruins from many different periods such as Canaanites, Philistines, Persians, Phoenicians, Greeks, Romans, Byzantines, Muslims and Crusaders.

=== Ancient Beit Guvrin and Maresha ===
Beit Guvrin-Maresha National Park is a national park in central Israel, 13 kilometers from Kiryat Gat, encompassing the ruins of Maresha, one of the important towns of Judah during the time of the First Temple, and Beit Guvrin, an important town in the Roman era, when it was known as Eleutheropolis. There are many Muslim saints which are buried in the area, the most known of them is Prophet Muhammad's companion Tamim al-Dari In 2014 UNESCO has recognized it as a World Heritage Site.

=== Crusader castles ===
Israel's territory corresponds in part to the Crusader kingdom of Jerusalem and boasts many castles and city fortifications from that time, although none were left intact by conquerors and the tooth of time. Most of them were built by the Crusaders and some by their Muslim enemies, and the most well-known of them are the cities of Acre and Caesarea, and the castles of Belvoir, Montfort, Arsuf, Sepphoris.

Israel also currently has control over the Arab-built Nimrod Castle in the Israeli-occupied Golan Heights.

=== Sea of Galilee ===
Sea of Galilee is home to many Christian and Jewish holy shrines, the Jewish holy shrines are in Tiberias (click for taking a look of the sites), and the Christian sites are outside Tiberias, some of them are archaeological sites, the sites are – Magdala, Capernaum, Tabgha and the Mount of Beatitudes, there are also another archaeological sites such as Kursi, Hippos, Hamat Tiberias, Tel Bet Yerah, Khirbat al-Minya and Chorazin.

it is also have a collection of fauna and flora.

=== Mount Arbel and the Horns of Hattin ===
Mount Arbel lies near the Sea of Galilee and is a national park with a fortress and synagogue and cliff hiking. The fortress was built by Jewish zealots and then in the Ottoman era by Fakhreddine II on the cliffs of the mountains, the ancient synagogue was built in the 5th century and survived little bit after the Islamic period started. The nearby area is the site of Horns of Hattin famous for his Islamic victory of Saladin at the Battle of Hattin and nearby this is the shrine of prophet shuaib, Maqam al-Nabi Shu'ayb is the holiest shrine for Druze faith; the Druze are making a big Ziyarat every year in April.

=== Rosh Hanikra grottoes ===
The Rosh HaNikra grottoes are cavernous tunnels formed by sea action on the soft chalk rock. The total length is some 200 metres. They branch off in various directions with some interconnecting segments. In the past, the only access to them was from the sea and experienced divers were the only ones capable of visiting. Today a cable car takes visitors down to see the grottos. A kibbutz, also named Rosh HaNikra, is located nearby. The Israeli city Nahariya is located about 10 km (6 miles) south of Rosh HaNikra. you must take a cable car to get into the grottoes. The Cable car is situated very close to the Lebanese border.

=== Makhtesh craters of the Negev desert ===
A makhtesh is a geological landform considered unique to the Negev desert of Israel. A makhtesh has steep walls of resistant rock surrounding a deep closed valley which is usually drained by a single wadi. The valleys have limited vegetation and soil, containing a variety of different colored rocks and diverse fauna and flora. The best known and largest makhtesh is Makhtesh Ramon. Other makhteshim are Makhtesh Gadol, Makhtesh Katan and Mount Arif.

=== Ancient city of Sepphoris ===
Sepphoris was an ancient Jewish city with synagogue, villas, baths, water tunnels, a Crusader fortress and more. An old Christian tradition places there the house of Saints Anne and Joachim, the parents of the Virgin Mary.

=== Hula Valley ===
Hula Lake Park, known in Hebrew as Agamon HaHula, is located in the southern part of the Hula Valley, north of the nature reserve. It was established as part of a JNF rehabilitation project. In the early 1990s part of the valley was flooded again in the wake of heavy rains. It was decided to develop the surrounding area and leave the flooded area intact. The new site has become the second home for thousands of migrating birds in the autumn and spring. The lake covers an area of one square kilometer, interspersed with islands that serve as protected bird nesting sites. It has become a major stopover for migrating birds flying from Europe to Africa and back, and also a major birdwatching site. In 2011, Israeli ornithologists confirmed that Lake Hula is the stopover point for tens of thousands of cranes migrating from Finland to Ethiopia every winter. In Israel, farmers set out food for them to keep them from damaging crops near the lake.

=== Tel Dan: A Biblical Site in the Golan Heights ===
Tel Dan is an ancient archaeological site located in the Golan. The site is known for its well-preserved remains of a Canaanite city-state, dating back to the 12th century BCE. It is also a significant biblical site, mentioned in the Hebrew Bible as the northernmost city of the Kingdom of Israel.

Tel Dan was a thriving city-state during the Iron Age, serving as a strategic outpost on the trade routes between Egypt and Mesopotamia. The city was conquered by the Israelites in the 11th century BCE and became part of the Kingdom of Israel.

- "And Jeroboam the son of Nebat made Israel to sin, and caused them to sin, and made them worship the golden calves which he had set up in Bethel and in Dan."
- "And they called the name of the city Dan, after the name of Dan their father, who was born first to Israel."

Excavations at Tel Dan have uncovered a wealth of archaeological artifacts, including:

- Stele of Hazael: A monumental stone inscription dating to the 9th century BCE, mentioning the Aramean king Hazael and his victory over the Kingdom of Israel.
- Temple remains: The remains of a Canaanite temple, dating back to the 12th century BCE, have been found at the site.
- City walls: The city walls of Tel Dan are well-preserved and provide evidence of the city's strategic importance.
- Domestic and public buildings: A variety of domestic and public buildings, including houses, workshops, and storage facilities, have been uncovered.

Tel Dan is a fascinating archaeological site that offers insights into the history and culture of the ancient Near East. Visitors to the site can explore the ruins, learn about the city's history, and appreciate the significance of this biblical landmark.

=== Ein Gedi ===
Ein Gedi is a special nature reserve, known for its big number of friendly Nubian ibex and rock hyrax, waterfalls, and there are some archaeological finds on the trail. Ein Gedi is an oasis in the desert which is good for relaxing and for those who want to take refuge from the hot Judean Desert, located near the Dead Sea

=== Keshet Cave ===
A big natural arch in Israel's Upper Galilee, which was a cave that was destroyed due to geological reasons over the years. Today only the arch remains and is a popular attraction for professional hiking.

== Bird watching ==
Israel is among the world's leading destinations for birdwatching, with birders and ornithologists heading especially for the annual migrations that funnel through Eilat and the Hula Valley.

== National parks and nature reserves ==
Israel has 67 national parks and 190 nature reserves. Some of them are located at archaeological sites. Beit Guvrin-Maresha is a large archaeological complex in the Judean Mountains. Sepphoris is an ancient Roman town with elaborate mosaics and a historic synagogue. Ein Gedi, a desert spring, is a starting point for tours to Masada and the Dead Sea.

== Hiking trails ==
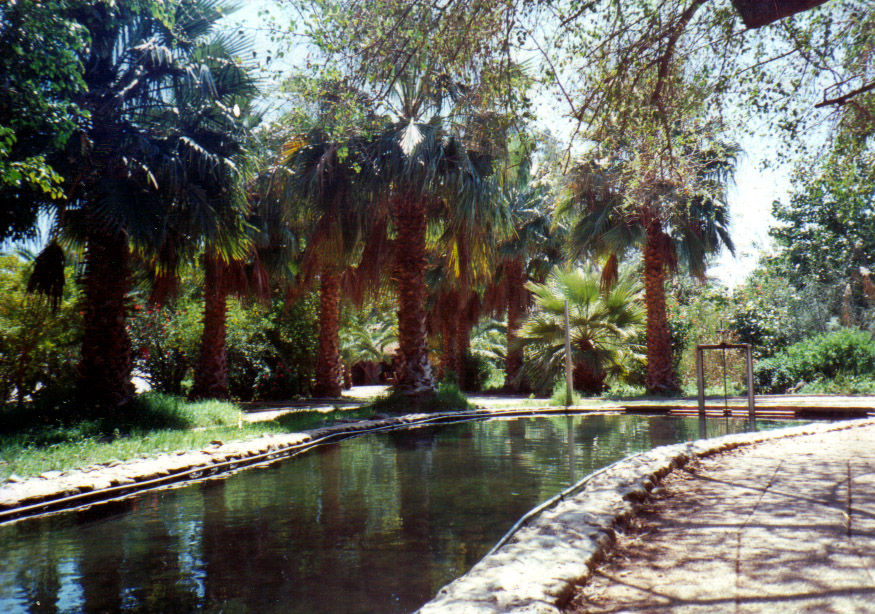
Tabgha pool, Jesus Trail

- Israel National Trail – a hiking path that crosses the entire country of Israel. Its northern end is at Dan, near the international Syrian and Lebanese borders in the far north of the country, and it extends to Eilat at the southernmost tip of Israel on the Red Sea, a length of approximately 940 km (580 mi). The trail takes about 30–70 days to finish if hiked continuously.
- Jerusalem Trail – 40 kilometres (25 mi) trail, connects the Israel National Trail with Jerusalem and the area of the Old City.
- Jesus Trail – a 65 kilometres (40 mi) hiking and pilgrimage route in the Galilee region of Israel that traces routes Jesus may have walked, connecting many sites from his life and ministry. The trail begins in Nazareth, and passes through Sepphoris, Cana (Kafr Kanna), the Horns of Hattin, Mount Arbel Cliffs, the Sea of Galilee, Capernaum, Tabgha, the Mount of Beatitudes, Tiberias, the Jordan River, Mount Tabor, and Mount Precipice.
- Golan Trail – a 125 kilometres (78 mi) route from the slopes of Mount Hermon to the southern Golan Heights. It passes many towns and settlements including Majdal Shams, Nimrod, Masade, Buq'ata, Odem, Merom Golan, and Ein Zivan.
- Valley of Springs Trail – a 120 kilometres (75 mi) route in and around the Jordan Valley, terminating in Beit She'an and on Mount Gilboa near Kibbutz Meirav. The trail connects numerous springs (for which the area is famous) and other historical and natural attractions.
- Sea to sea trail – an 89 kilometres (55 mi) hiking trail in Northern Israel that goes from the Mediterranean Sea to the Sea of Galilee.

== Kibbutzim ==
A network of kibbutzim dot the countryside, some offering guesthouses and country lodging. They are undergoing a process of modernization and re-organization. Well known in Israel for great contributions to Israeli history, politics, the army, and Zionism. Long-term visitors, both Jewish and non-Jewish, can volunteer on Kibbutzim in exchange for food and lodging.

== Museums ==
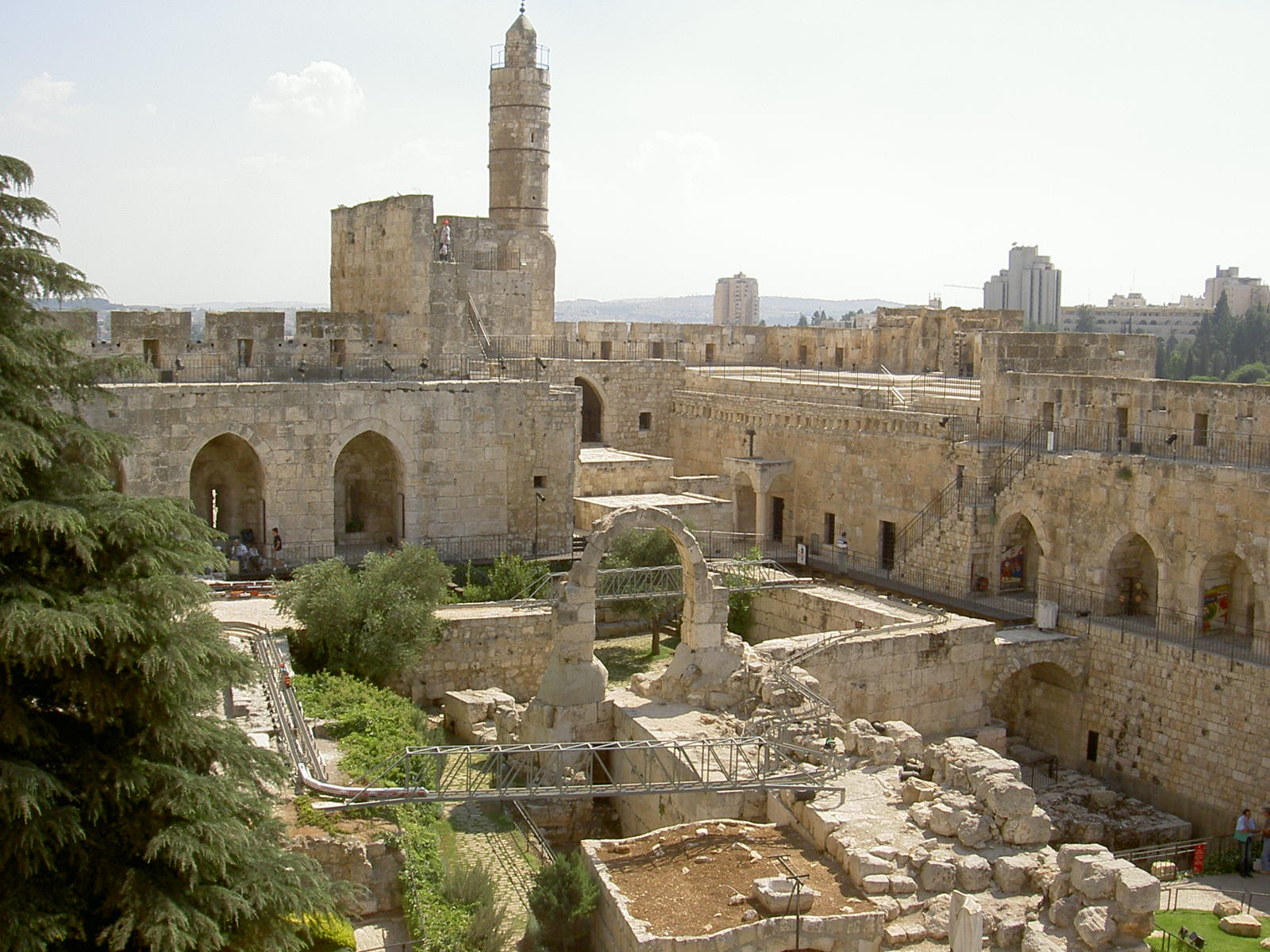
Tower of David Museum

With over 200 museums, Israel has the highest number of museums per capita in the world, with millions of visitors annually.

- Israel Museum in Jerusalem, Israel's national museum, attracts 800,000 visitors a year.
- Tower of David Museum of the History of Jerusalem
- Yad Vashem, Israel's Holocaust memorial
- Tel Aviv Museum of Art
- Diaspora Museum
- Haifa Museum of Science and Technology

== Restaurant culture ==
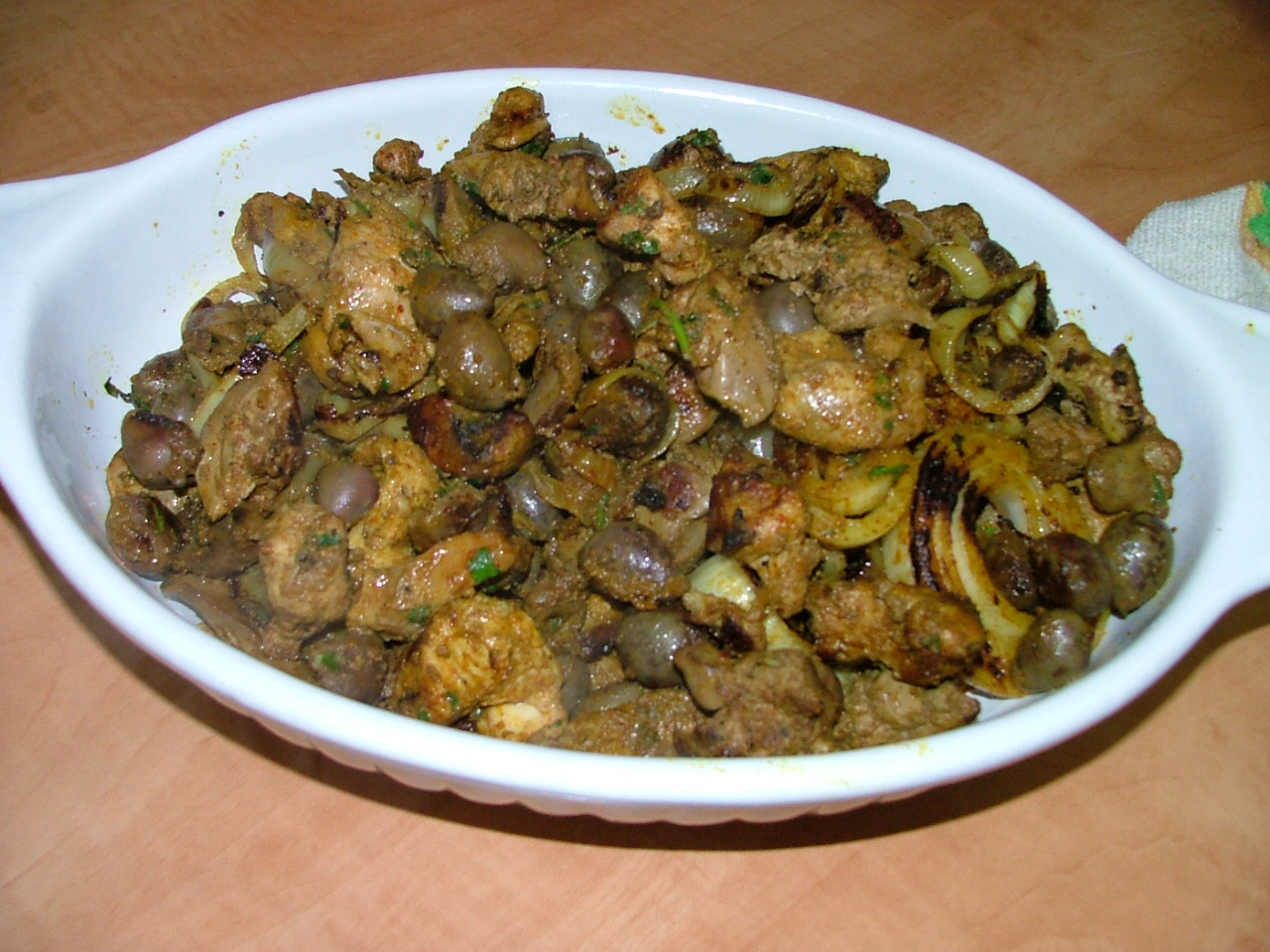
Jerusalem mixed grill

As part of its hospitality industry, including hotels, restaurants and wineries, one of the most vibrant restaurant cultures in the Mediterranean region has developed in Israel since the 1990s, catering to both tourists and citizens. Professional training for Israeli chefs, hotel owners, sommeliers and vintners is of a high standard, and top hotel chefs have international education and experience.

There are thousands of restaurants, casual eateries, cafés and bars in Israel, offering a wide range of choices in food and culinary styles. the cuisine of Jerusalem, for example, reflects a blend of Jewish culinary traditions, including Sephardic, Kurdish, Ashkenazi, as well as Palestinian Arab traditions. In addition to Middle Eastern specialties, there are restaurants offering a wide selection of ethnic food, including Italian, French, Greek, Russian, Ethiopian, Balkan, Thai, Chinese, American and fusion cuisine.

Places to eat out that are typically Israeli include falafel stands or kiosks, which also offer extras like French fries, fried eggplant, salads and pickles with the falafel, and the hummusia, which specializes in hummus, and offers only a limited selection of extras. The Misada Mizrahit (literally, "Eastern restaurant") is an inexpensively priced restaurant that serves a basic selection of meze salads followed by grilled meat with French fries, fried kibbeh and simple desserts, while Steakiyot are restaurants which serve a meze of salads, followed by skewered grilled meats, particularly meorav yerushalmi and kebabs or sometimes by kibbeh stew like kibbeh in okra and tomato stew, beet stew.

Cafés are common in urban areas and function as meeting places both for socializing and conducting business. They commonly serve coffee, tea, fruit juice and soft drinks and almost all serve baked goods and sandwiches; many also serve light meals. Most have outdoor seating to take advantage of Israel's temperate weather, and Tel Aviv is particularly well known for its café culture. Tea is also served in cafés, from plain brewed Russian-style with sugar, to tea with lemon or milk, and Middle Eastern-style with mint (nana). There is also a strong coffee drinking culture in Israel and coffee is prepared in many ways, such as instant (nes), iced, latte (hafuḥ), Italian-style espresso, or Turkish coffee.

== Wineries ==
Enotourism is a growing part of the tourism sector in Israel. In early 2008, it was announced that a 150-acre (0.61 km^{2}) wine park would be created on the slopes between Zichron Ya'akov and Binyamina in order to promote tourism in the area and enotourism in Israel in general.

== Hot springs ==
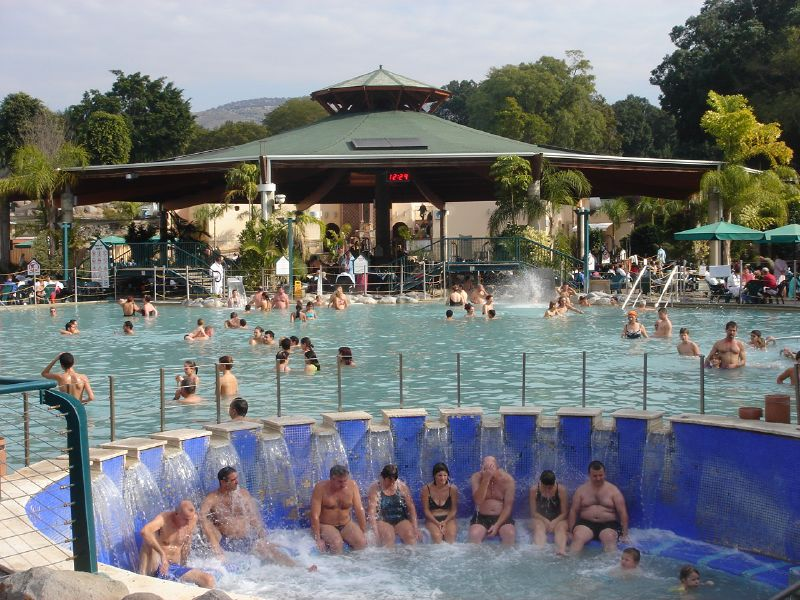
Hamat Gader hot springs

- Hamat Gader
- Tiberias hot springs
- Yoav hot springs (Hamei Yoav)

== Israeli-occupied territories ==
In March 2021, the Centre for Research on Multinational Corporations published a report that stated: "tour operators across Europe and North America are deceptively offering unsuspecting consumers misleading package tours to Israel and Palestine. These tours are labelled as destined to ‘Israel’ but actually include locations in the occupied Palestinian territory (OPT), and in the occupied Syrian Golan. Many include illegal Israeli settlements, which are the source of a wide range of serious human rights violations suffered by Palestinian communities and the Palestinian people as a whole."

=== West Bank tourism ===
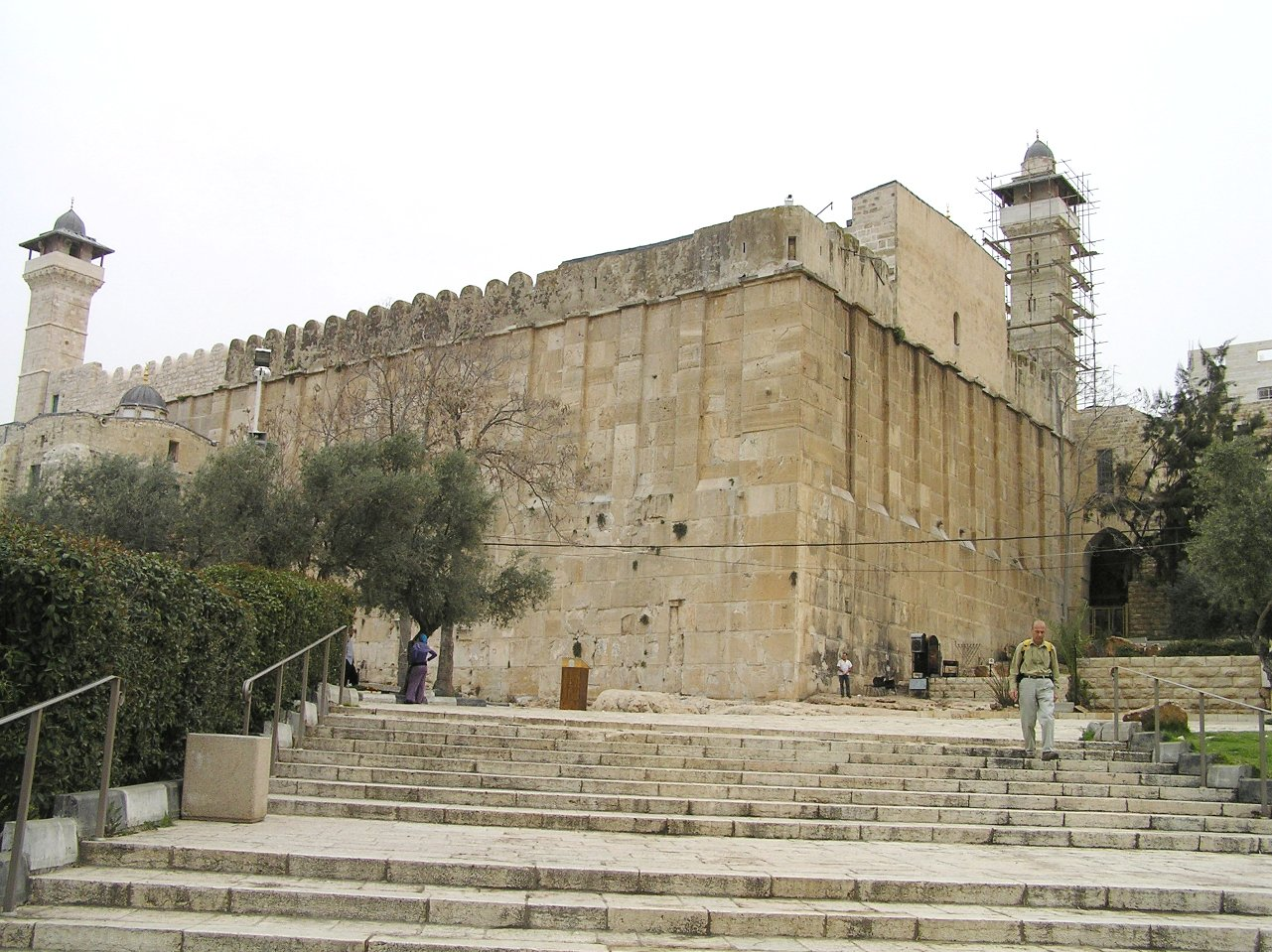
Cave of the Patriarchs in Hebron

West Bank tourism has been controlled by Israel since the territory was occupied in 1967. Territory that had been off-limits to Israeli citizens was now made available for tourism, and Israel established numerous amenities in these territories and East Jerusalem to make it more appealing to Israeli and foreign tourists. Despite that, Israeli citizens are generally restricted from traveling to parts of the West Bank under Palestinian Authority control. Today, the Palestinian Authority and Israeli tourism ministries work together on tourism in the Palestinian territories in a Joint Committee on Tourism.

- Bethlehem - Burial place of the matriarch Rachel and birthplace of King David and of Jesus. Around 1.3 million tourists visited the city in 2008. Popular sites in the city and around include: The Church of the Nativity, a church built over the cave that tradition marks as the birthplace of Jesus of Nazareth; The Manger Square; Shepherd's Field in Beit Sahour; Solomon's Pools; and the Salesian Cremisan Monastery.
- Herodium - A fortress built by Herod the Great. It is administered by the Israel Nature and Parks Authority.
- Hebron – The second-holiest city in Judaism and the place where the Tomb of the Patriarchs and Matriarchs is located, according to Jewish and Islamic tradition. It was also the capital of the Kingdom of Judah before David moved it to Jerusalem.
- Jericho – Tourism increased by nearly 42.3% in the first three-quarters of 2008 as crossing between areas under PA control and Israel became less restricted.
- Qumran – An ancient Jewish site where the Dead Sea Scrolls were discovered. It is administered by the Israel Nature and Parks Authority.
- Nablus – Also known as Shechem, where Joseph's Tomb and Jacob's Well can be found.

=== Golan Heights tourism ===
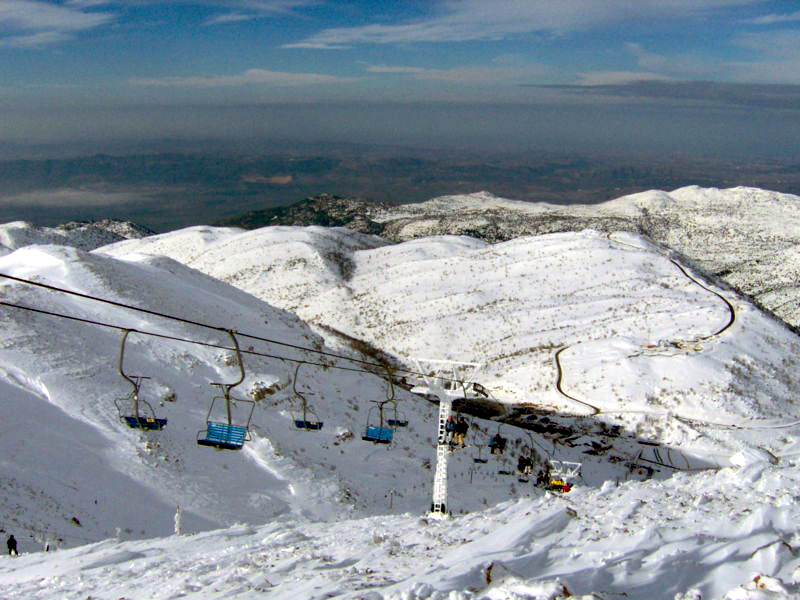
Mount Hermon ski resort

The Golan Heights were captured by Israel from Syria in the 1967 Six-Day War and are recognized by the international community as Syrian territory held by Israel under military occupation. However, in 2019 the United States recognized Israeli sovereignty of the area. In an act ruled null and void by the United Nations Security Council, Israel applied civilian law to the territory in 1981.

For ease of touring, the Golan can be divided into the north with most of its popular destinations and the south where the administrative capital is located. Travel guides recommend renting a car or joining an organized tour. Although it is slower, some travelers chose to hitchhike throughout the region. Accommodations are typically through bed and breakfasts or cabins called zimmers.

The first Israeli ski resort was established in the Golan. Nature trails and other attractions were established by Israel in order to further entrench its presence in the territory and to attract tourists. As much of the Golan's land is not arable, many of the Israeli settlements established focused on tourism as a way of generating income.

- The Golan has national parks which provide extensive hiking options. Most of these are maintained by the Israel Nature and Parks Authority. Land mines from previous wars pose a risk when clearly marked and fenced off areas are disregarded.
- The Mount Hermon ski resort is popular during the winter months. This is the first Israeli ski resort in the Golan.
- The area produces wine and the Golan Heights Winery is a large producer. The winery has a visitor center and tours.
- Archaeology in Katzrin, Gamla, Nimrod Fortress, Rujm el-Hiri, Umm el Kanatir

== Seas and lakes ==
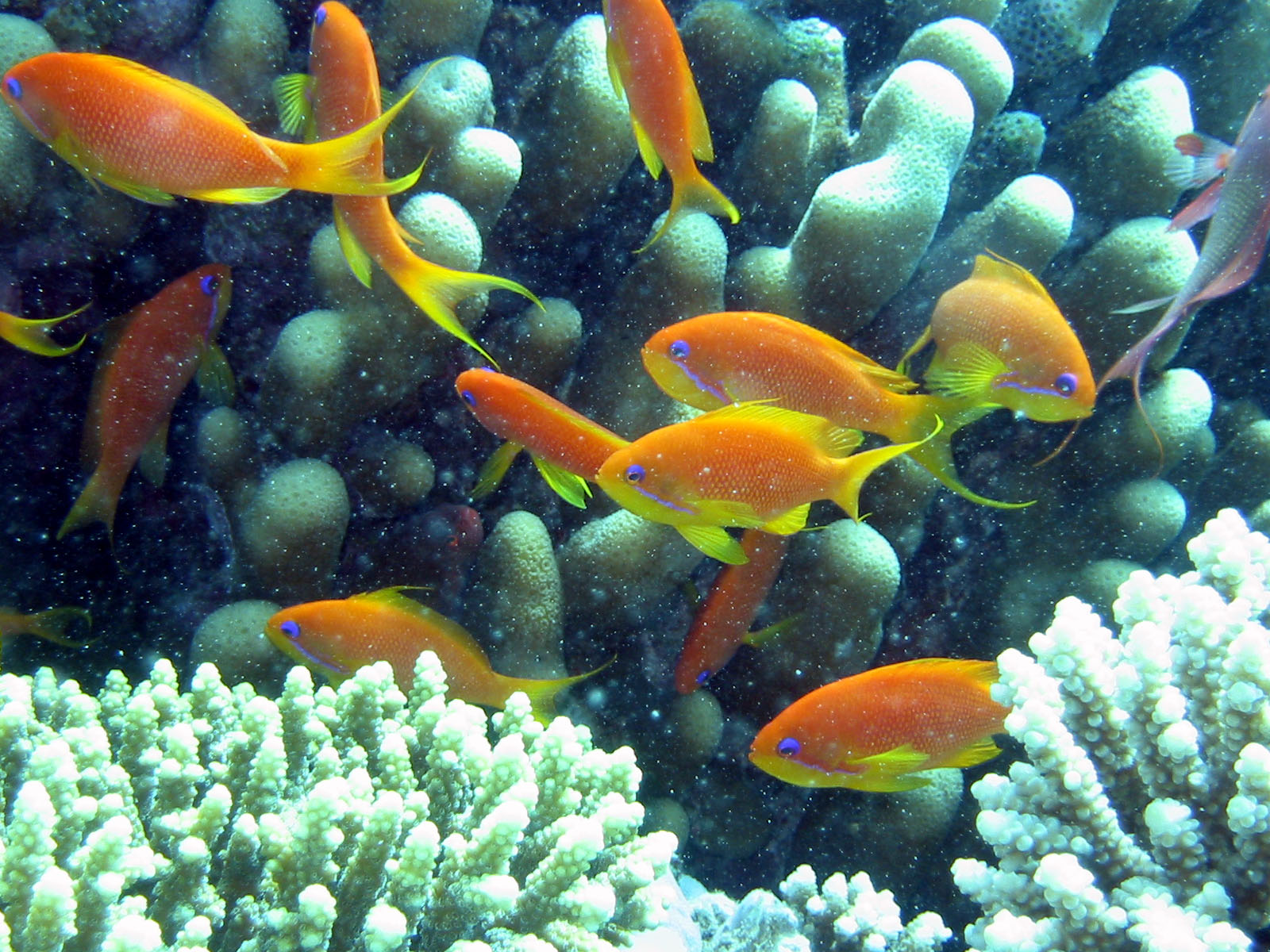
Red Sea coral and marine fish in Eilat

Mediterranean coastal strip

- Sunny beaches and hotel resorts

Dead Sea

- The lowest point on the Earth's surface and the deepest hypersaline lake in the world, famous for its buoyancy and medicinal qualities

Red Sea

- Sunny beaches and hotel resorts, popular destination for SCUBA diving and water sports

Sea of Galilee

- Sunny beaches and hotel resorts
- Important Christian and Jewish holy sites
- Many archaeological sites.

=== Dive tourism ===
Eilat is located in the Gulf of Aqaba, one of the most popular diving destinations in the world. The coral reefs along Eilat's coast remain relatively pristine and the area is recognized as one of the prime diving locations in the world. About 250,000 dives are performed annually off Eilat's 11 km coastline, and diving represents 10% of the tourism income of this area. In addition, given the proximity of many of these reefs to the shore, non-divers can encounter the Red Sea's reefs with relative ease. Water conditions for SCUBA divers are good all year round, with water temperatures around 21–25 °C, little or no currents and clear waters with an average of 20–30 meters visibility.

== Medical tourism ==
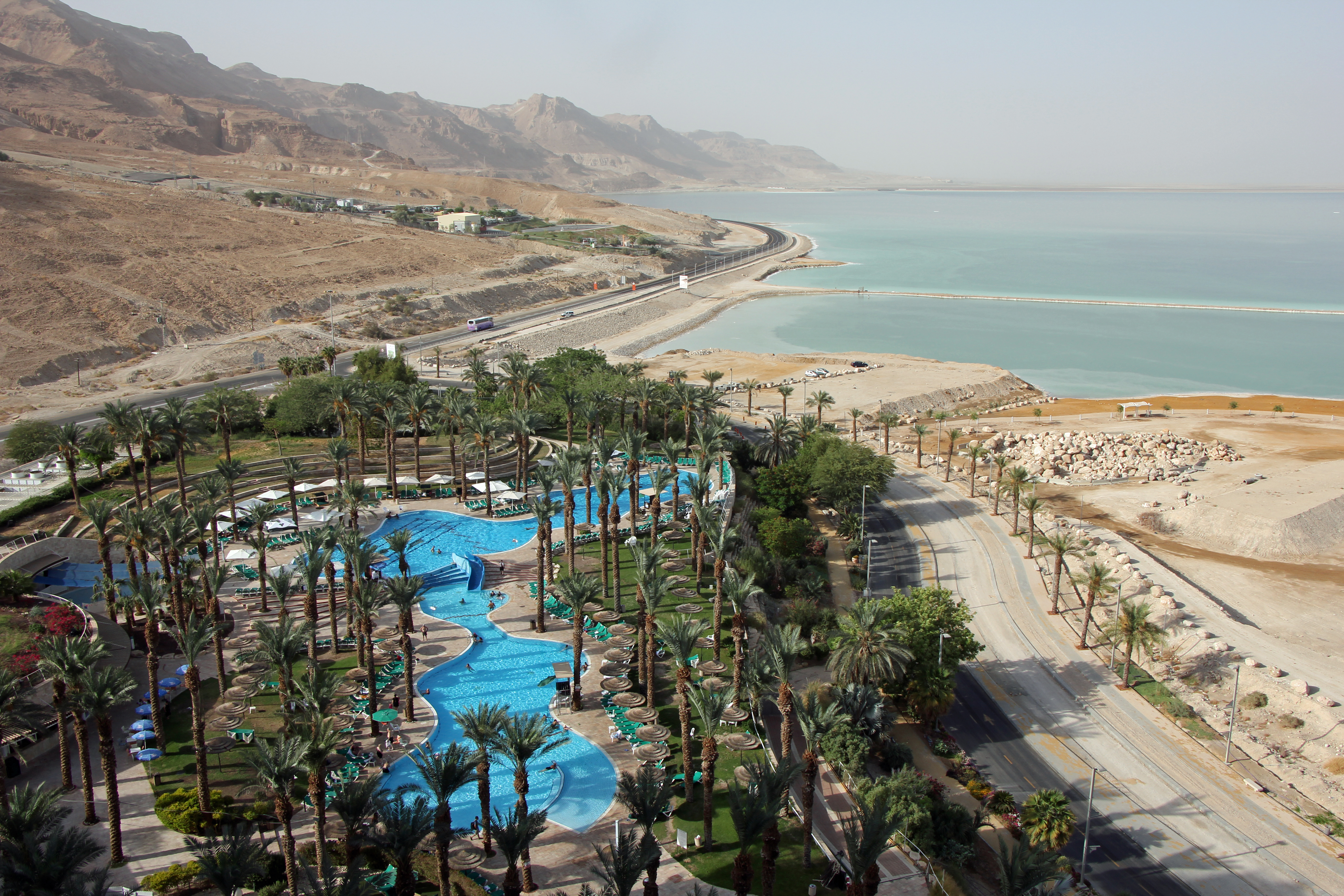
Ein Bokek resort on the shore of the Dead Sea

Israel is emerging as a popular destination for medical tourists. In 2006, 15,000 foreign visitors travelled to the country for medical procedures, bringing in $40 million of revenue. The advantages of Israel for health tourism include good natural resources; stable, comfortable climate all year round; a progressive medical systems, and scenic locations which have a calming effect on patients. Medical tourists choose Israel for several reasons. Some come from European nations such as Romania where certain procedures are not available. Others come to Israel, most commonly from the United States, because they can receive quality health care at a fraction of the cost it would be at home, for both surgeries and in-vitro fertilization treatments. Other medical tourists come to Israel to visit the Dead Sea, a world-famous therapeutic resort. The Israel Ministry of Tourism and several professional medical services providers have set out to generate awareness of Israel's medical capabilities.

== Tourist demographics and economic contribution ==
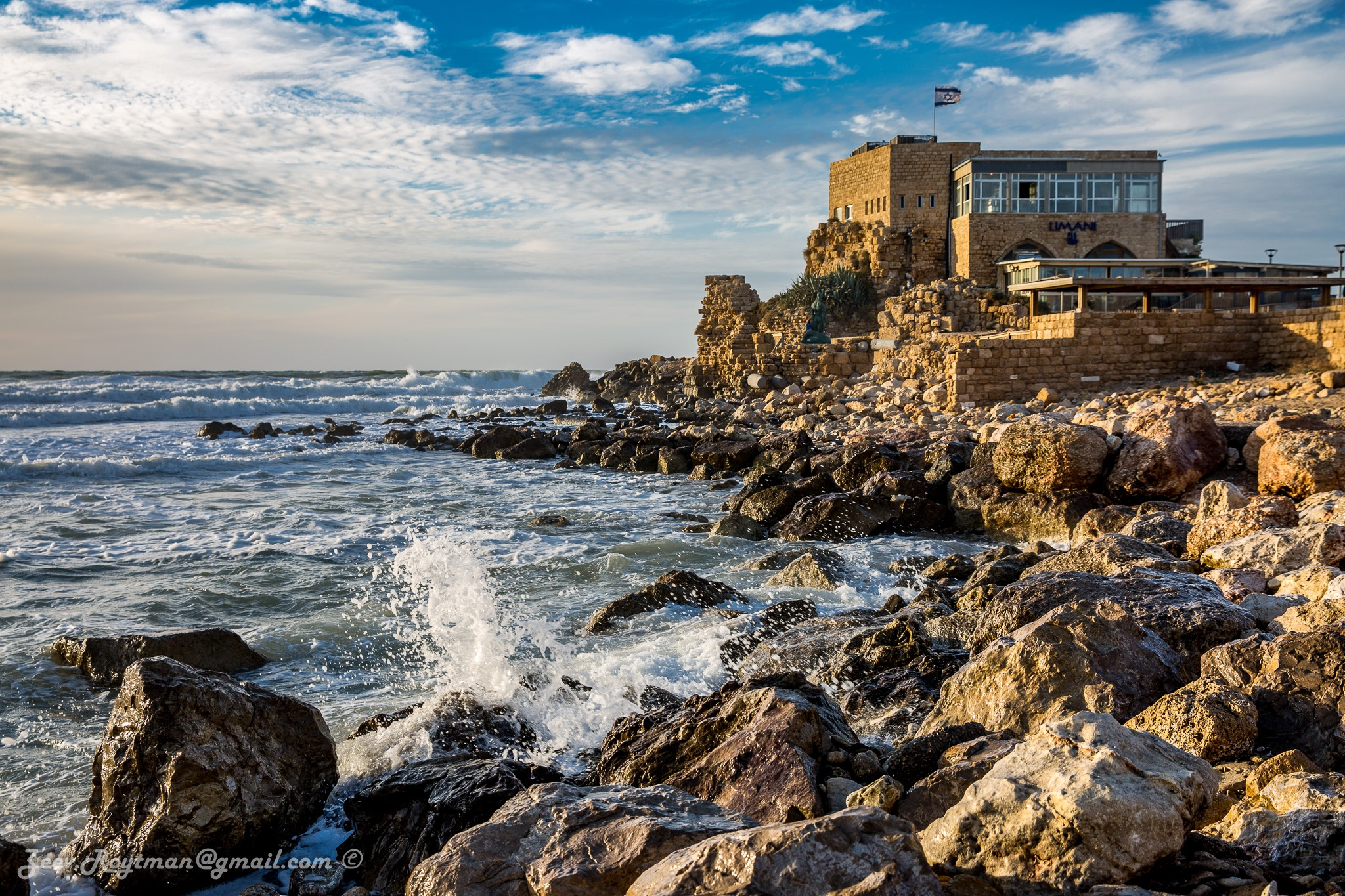
Caesarea

According to the Israeli Ministry of Tourism, in 2009 54% of the 2.7 million visitors to Israel were Christian. Jewish tourists accounted for 39%. Revenue from tourism in 2009 totalled $3.3 billion. In 2010, tourism constituted 6.4% of the country's GDP. The World Travel and Tourism Council estimates that real GDP growth for tourism in Israel is expected to average 5.0% per annum over the years 2010–2020. The contribution of tourism to Gross Domestic Product is expected by WTTC to rise from 6.4% (US$12.0 billion) in 2010 to 7.2% ($22.1 billion) by 2020. The contribution of the industry to employment is 223,000 jobs in 2010, 7.9% of total employment. Export earnings from international visitors and tourism goods are expected to generate 6.5% of total exports (US$4.8 billion) in 2010. Investment in tourism is estimated at US$2.3 billion or 7.6% of total investment in 2010. The Israel Travel & Tourism economy is ranked number 51 in absolute size worldwide, of the 181 countries estimated by the WTTC.

=== Tourism abroad by Israelis ===
Offsetting the economic contribution by tourists visiting Israel is the larger number of Israelis touring abroad. In 1993, for example, "tourism brought $750 million into the country, but Israeli tourists spent $2 billion abroad." Statistics published a decade later reported "some 2 million Israelis touring the world."

== International recognition and awards ==
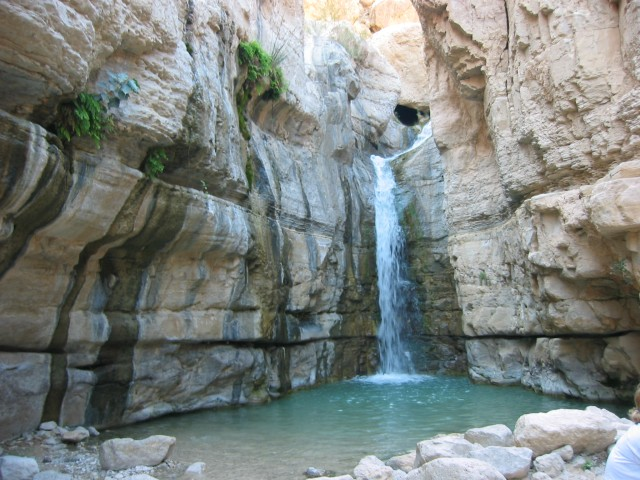
Nahal Arugot waterfall in Ein Gedi

In 2005, Ernst & Young conducted a comprehensive research study on Israeli tourism. The report, entitled "A New Market Strategy for Israeli Tourism" was published in November 2006. The researchers felt that increasing the number of international tourists by 2011 from 1.9 million to 4–5 million was a feasible goal. The report stated that Israel's most attractive feature for international markets was its religious culture and history and the great diversity it offers within a very small country. According to the researchers, Israel's different cultures and religions, its diverse landscapes, the contrasts between cities (Jerusalem, Tel Aviv), and combination of European, North African and Middle Eastern culture produced a "very high density of experience." The report recommended that Israel adopt appropriate marketing strategies to counter any perceived negative imagery associated with political developments.

In 2010, Israel won the title of "most outstanding stand" in all categories at the world's largest tourism fair, ITB, held in Berlin. The Israeli stand won the title of "best presenter" in the Near East and Middle East for the third time in a row.

In 2024, Jerusalem and Tel Aviv were ranked among the top ten cities in the Middle East and Africa by readers of the American tourism magazine "Travel + Leisure".

== Most visited sites ==
=== Free ===
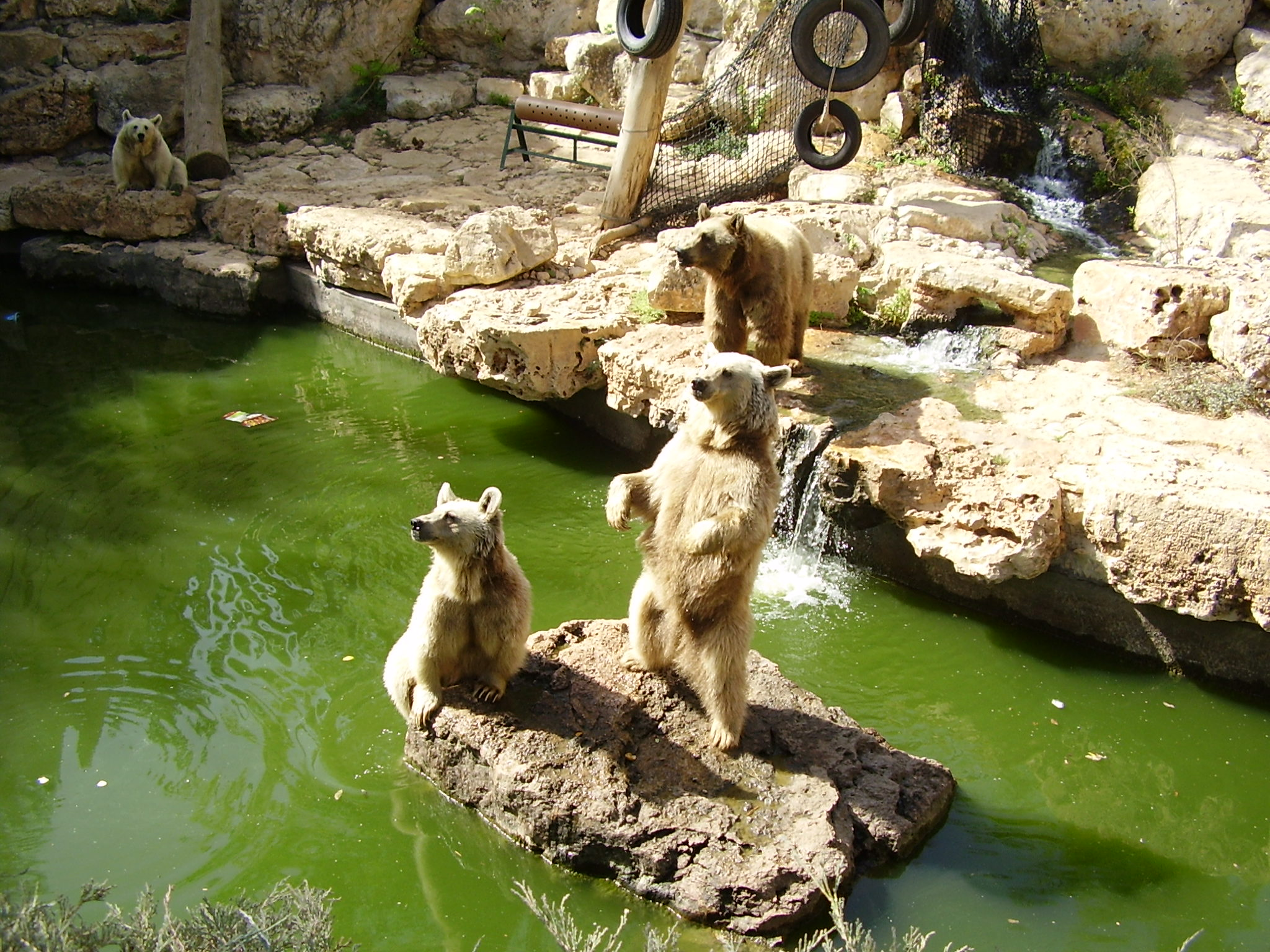
Syrian brown bears in Jerusalem Biblical Zoo

In 2009, the most visited Jewish religious site in Israel were the Western Wall, and the second-most visited Jewish religious site in Israel was the grave of Rabbi Shimon bar Yochai at Mount Meron.

=== Paid ===
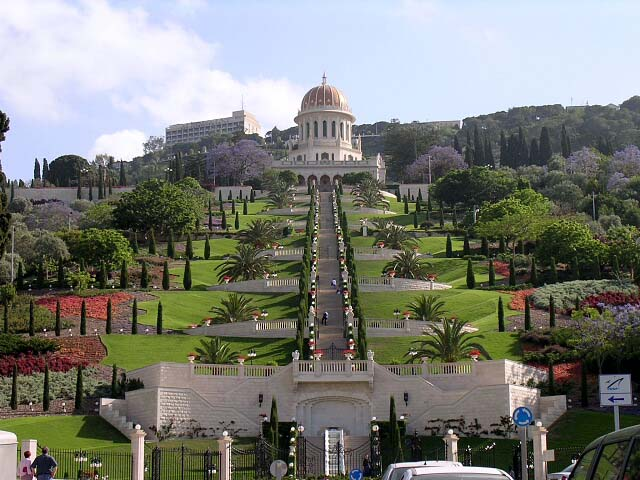
The Shrine of the Báb at the Baháʼí World Centre, in Haifa

The most popular paid tourist attraction is the Jerusalem Biblical Zoo. The top paid sites of 2012 were listed by Dun & Bradstreet Israel were as follows"

Listing	Site	2008 Visitors	2012 Visitors
1	Jerusalem Biblical Zoo	687,647	752,000
2	Masada	721,915	724,000
3	Zoological Center of Tel Aviv-Ramat Gan	581,800	713,000
4	Caesarea	713,648	670,000
5	Hermon National Park (Banias)	430,531	561,000
6	Ein Gedi Antiquities National Park		471,000
7	Hamat Gader	500,000	440,000
8	Yamit 2000 in Holon	412,533	431,000
9	Coral World Underwater Observatory in Eilat	458,000	423,000
10	Qumran National Park	389,291	377,000

== Foreign visitor arrivals ==
Total number of tourists in Israel in 2018 was 4,113,100. This was an increase of 14% over the previous year. (Note: 2017–18 statistics come from the Israeli Ministry of Tourism, while other years' stats are from the Israel Central Bureau of Statistics, therefore some data may be inconsistent)

Country	2014	2015	2016	2017	2018	2019	2020	2021	2022	2023	2024	2025
United States	622,100	637,200	672,100	778,600	897,100	1,007,600	–	–	858,500	920,100	330,500	449,900
Russia	555,900	414,700	284,600	330,500	316,100	394,400	–	–	174,500	176,100	70,400	74,900
France	298,600	300,100	293,000	308,700	346,000	376,500	–	–	242,300	237,900	129,900	176,800
Germany	194,200	197,800	180,100	218,200	262,500	306,400	–	–	169,600	167,400	25,500	43,300
United Kingdom	180,100	197,900	197,100	198,500	217,900	259,900	–	–	191,100	195,800	79,600	105,400
Italy	120,100	91,200	88,000	107,700	150,600	201,100	–	–	91,300	115,600	16,300	24,200
Ukraine	132,400	138,000	164,500	146,800	137,800	181,700	–	–	73,500	63,600	31,200	33,800
Poland	77,200	66,200	54,300	97,400	151,900	177,800	–	–	45,000	90,300	6,500	10,900
China	33,000	47,400	85,900	113,600	104,900	159,600	–	–	6,700	23,200	4,200	7,700
Romania	44,700	45,100	50,900	78,900	106,900	125,900	–	–	51,900	95,300	11,900	30,100
Spain	47,300	43,600	46,200	62,400	77,700	109,900	–	–	60,100	82,300	10,200	16,600
Canada	66,200	66,700	69,900	80,600	92,000	101,300	–	–	68,200	75,300	21,800	31,300
Netherlands	51,800	49,400	51,400	64,000	83,000	94,700	–	–	44,100	49,300	9,400	13,300
Brazil	51,900	43,900	35,500	54,800	62,500	86,600	–	–	68,000	65,300	12,100	20,600
Switzerland	39,900	40,600	42,900	48,700	57,100	66,100	–	–	34,300	35,400	12,600	15,500
India	34,900	39,300	44,800	58,000	70,700	65,600	–	–	31,100	42.100	9,800	13,800
South Korea	22,600	22,600	28,300	39,600	45,200	61,200	–	–	13,100	38,000	3,000	5,600
Australia	33,100	31,900	32,000	39,900	43,000	53,900	–	–	29,700	40,400	9,600	14,300
Mexico	20,700	22,400	20,700	28,300	38,300	53,600	–	–	38,900	47,000	7,600	13,000
Austria	30,800	25,700	24,000	29,000	38,700	50,900	–	–	25,200	25,700	6,300	9,000
Belgium	33,900	33,800	34,000	36,300	40,700	46,400	–	–	31,700	32,700	12,900	16,300
Total visitors	3,251,000	3,108,600	3,069,800	3,612,000	4,113,100	4,904,600	887,100	402,300	2,851,300	3,239,100	974,400	1,343,000

== See also ==
- Visa policy of Israel
- List of caves in Israel
- Culture of Israel
- Economy of Israel
