= Safed =

City in northern Israel

Safed: צפת; صفد; Tzfat
- City
- Zefat

Hebrew transcription(s)
  - Scholarly: Ṣəp̄aṯ
  - ISO 259-3: Çpat
  - Modern Israeli: Tz'fat
  - Also spelled: Tsfat, Tzefat, Zfat, Sfat, (official) Zefat

Arabic transcription(s)
  - ISO 233: Ṣafad
  - Also spelled: Safad
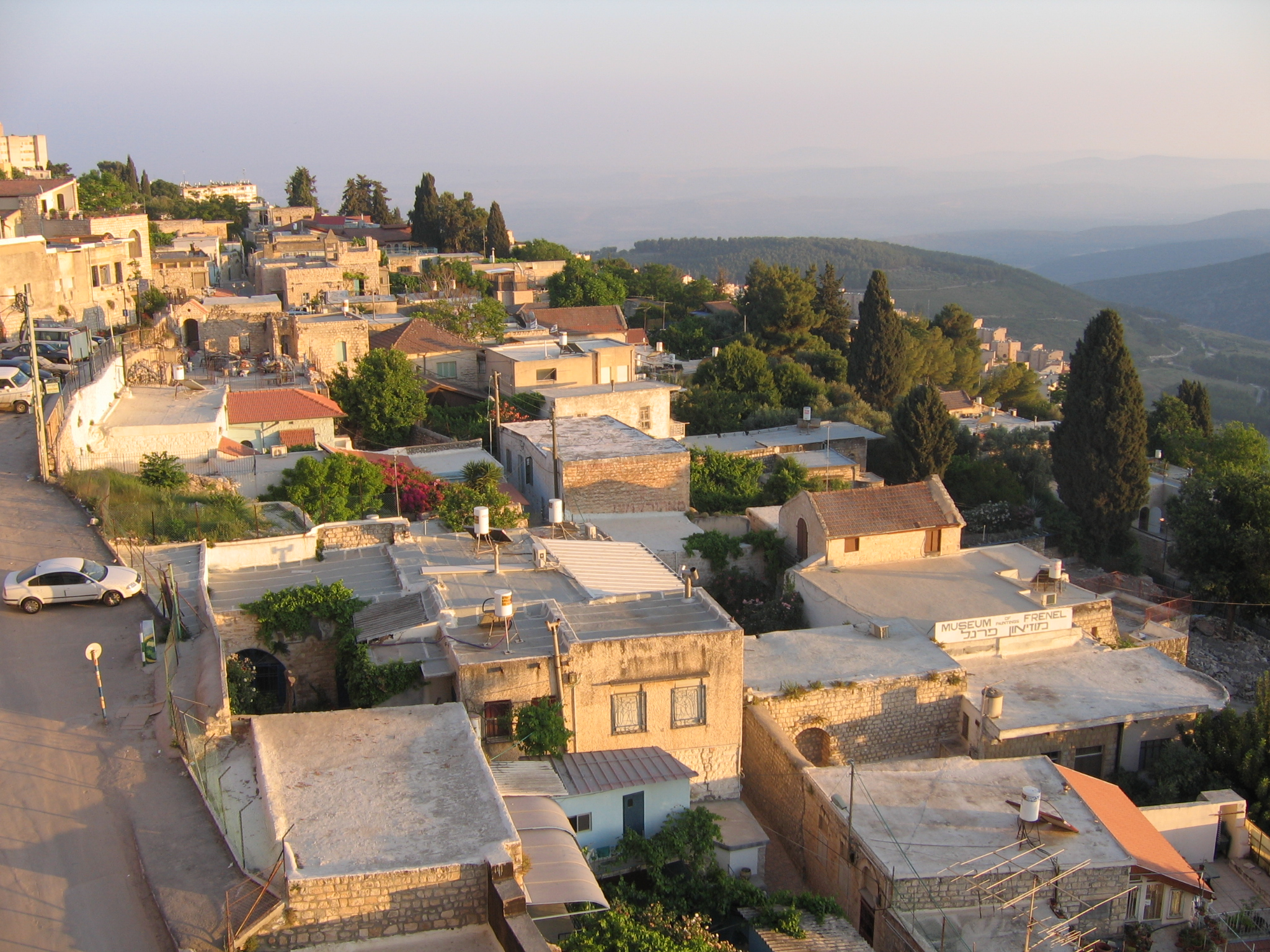
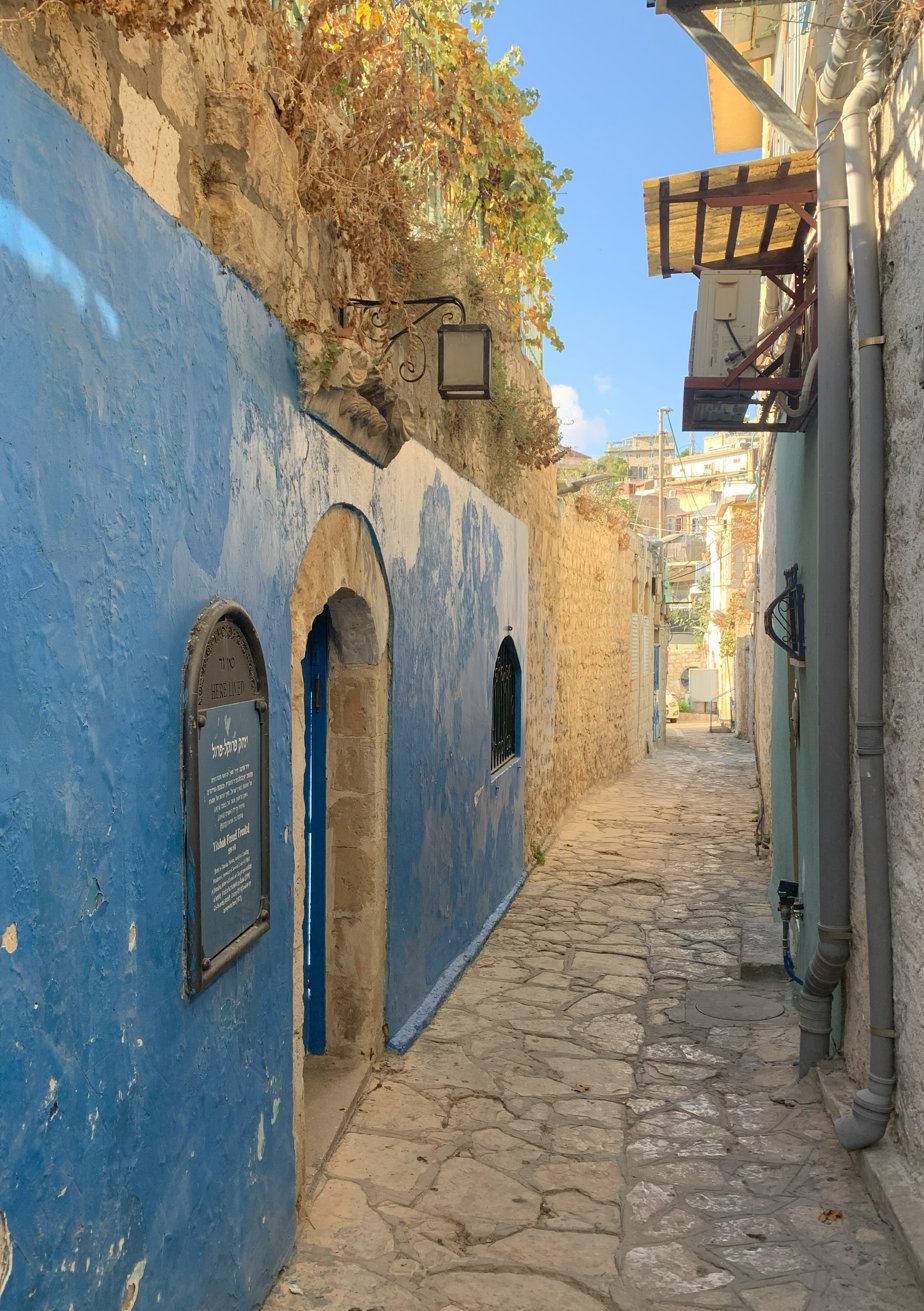
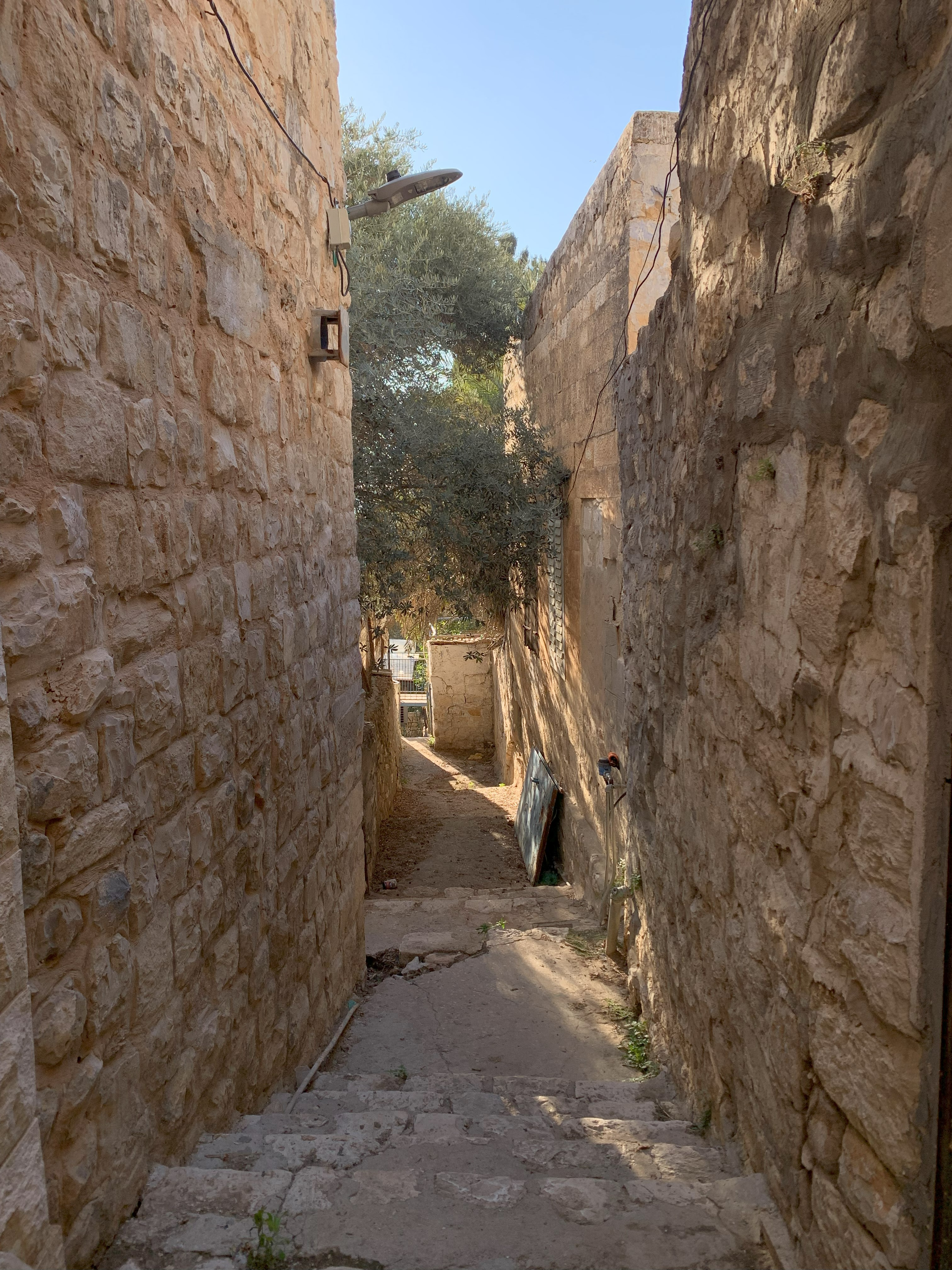
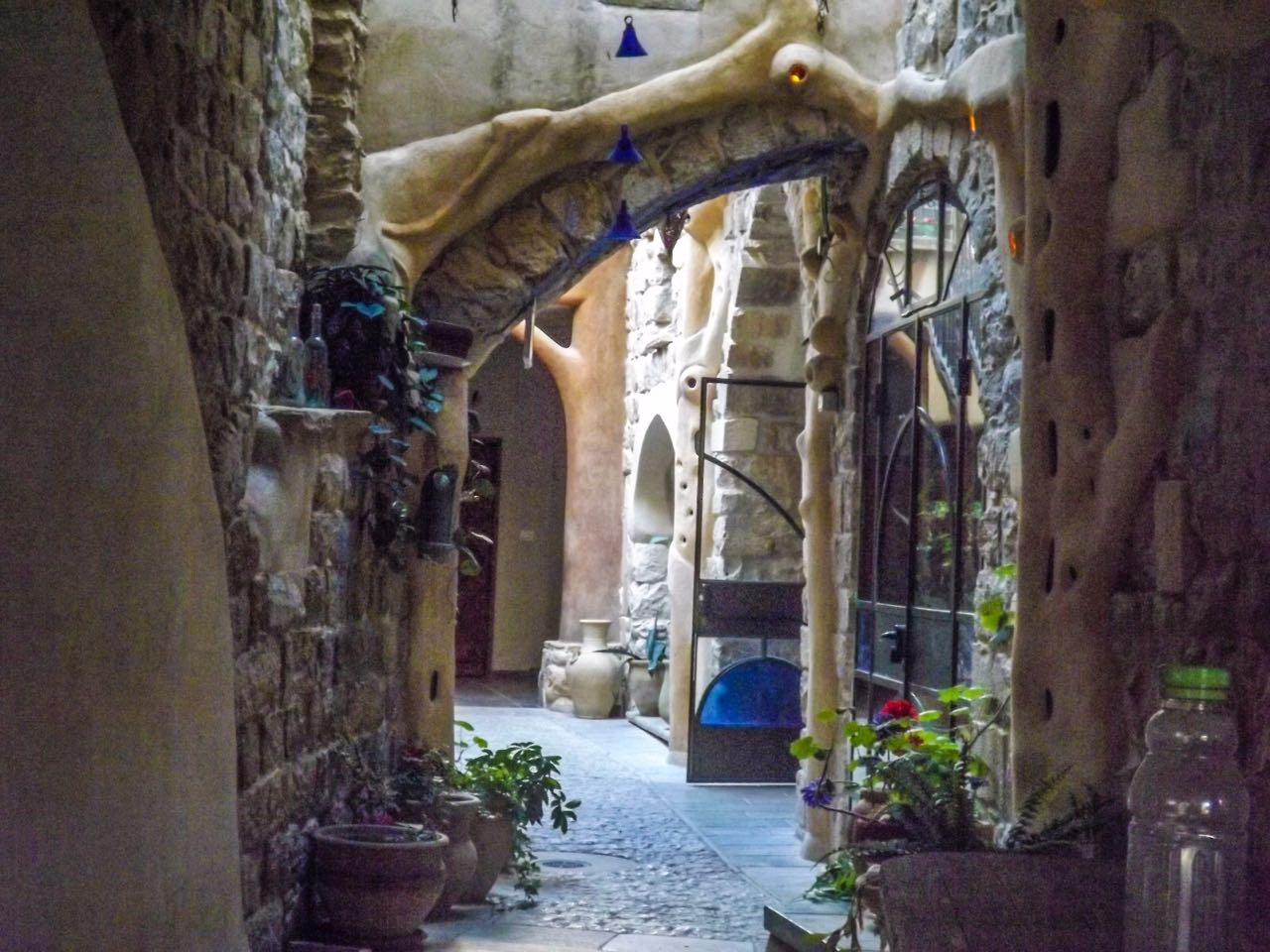
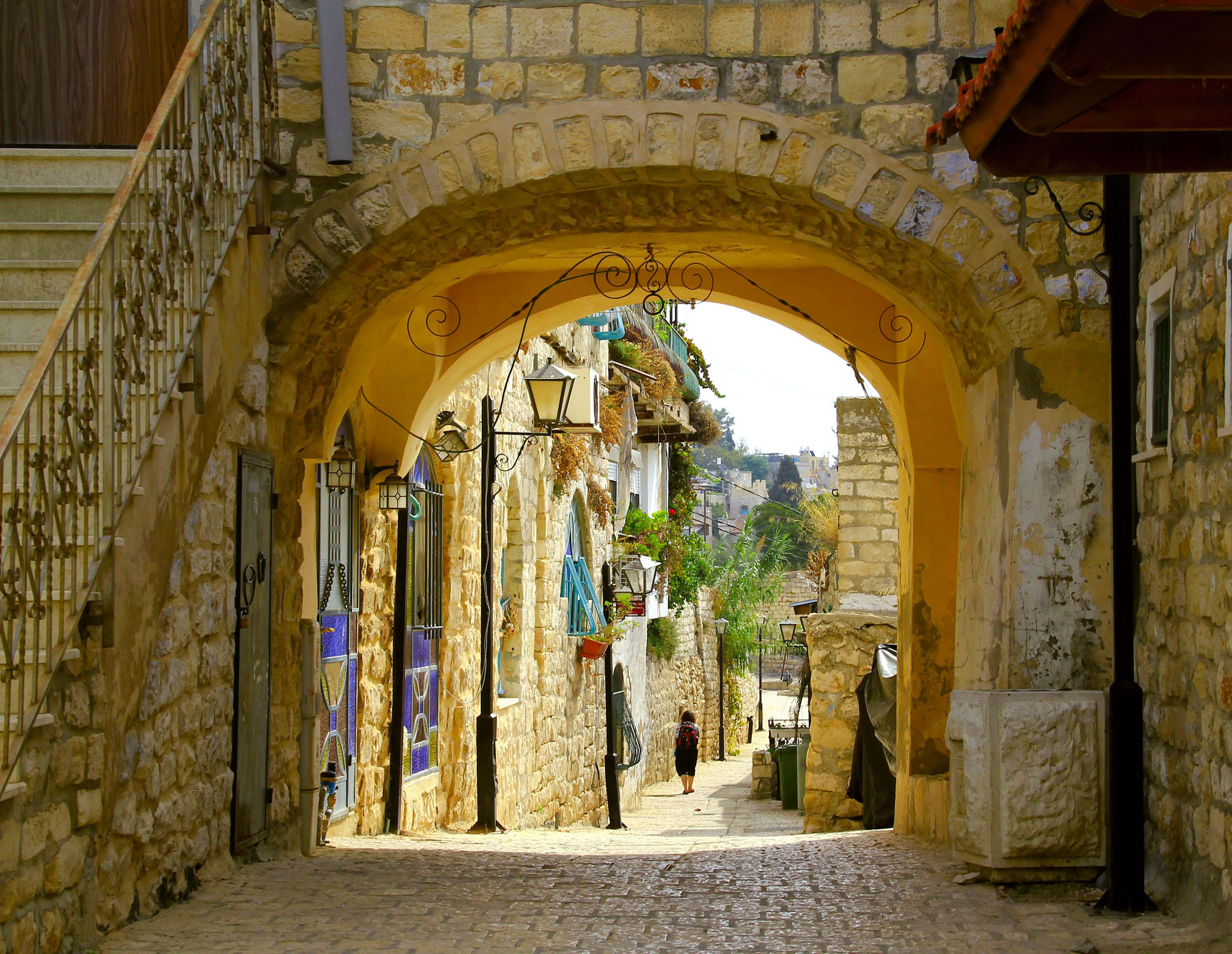
- A look from above at Safed against the backdrop of the Galilee mountains. Alleys in the artists' quarter of Safed. Alley within the Makemat and White Donkey Khan. Street in the old city.

- Location within Northeast Israel Location within Israel
- Coordinates: 32°57′57″N 35°29′54″E
- Country: Israel
- District: Northern
- Subdistrict: Safed
- Natural Region: Eastern Upper Galilee
- Founded: 1500 BCE

Government
  - Mayor: Yossi Kakon
- Elevation: 850 m (2,790 ft)

Population (2024)
  - Total: 38,687

Ethnicity
  - Jews and others: 97.9%
  - Arabs: 2.1%
- Website: www.zefat.muni.il

Safed (/ˈsɑːfɛd/ SAH-fed; Arabic: صَفَد, romanized: Ṣafad), also known as Tzfat and officially as Zefat (Hebrew: צְפַת, romanized: Ṣəp̄aṯ), (Note: The name is also transliterated in a variety of other ways.) is a city in the Northern District of Israel. Located at an elevation of up to 937 m (3,074 ft), Safed is the highest city in the Galilee and in Israel. In 2022, 93.2% of the population was Jewish and 6.8% was counted as other.

Safed has been identified with Sepph (Σέπφ), a fortified town in the Upper Galilee mentioned in the writings of the Roman Jewish historian Josephus. The Jerusalem Talmud mentions Safed as one of five elevated spots where fires were lit to announce the Rosh Chodesh and holidays during the Second Temple period. Safed attained local prominence under the Crusaders, who built a large fortress there in 1168. It was conquered by Saladin 20 years later, and demolished by his grandnephew al-Mu'azzam Isa in 1219. After a treaty with the Crusaders in 1240, a larger fortress was erected and expanded and reinforced in 1268 by the Mamluk sultan Baybars, who developed Safed into a major town and the capital of a new province spanning the Galilee.

After a century of general decline, the stability brought by the 1517 Ottoman conquest ushered in nearly a century of growth and prosperity in Safed, during which time Jewish immigrants from across Europe developed the city into a center for wool and textile production and the mystical Kabbalah movement. It became known as one of the Four Holy Cities of Judaism. As the capital of Safed Sanjak, it was the main population center of the Galilee, with large Muslim and Jewish communities. Despite the fortunate governorship of Fakhr al-Din II in the early 17th century, the city underwent a general decline and, by the mid-18th century, was eclipsed by Acre. Druze and Muslim locals raided the Jewish community in 1834 and 1838. Many Jewish residents perished in the 1837 Galilee earthquake; through the philanthropy of Moses Montefiore, its synagogues and homes were rebuilt. Safed's population reached 24,000 toward the end of the 19th century, divided roughly equally between Jews and Muslims, with a small Christian community. Muslim merchants played a key role as middlemen in the grain trade between local farmers and traders in Acre, while the Ottomans promoted the city as a center of Sunni jurisprudence. Safed's conditions improved during this period, with the establishment of a municipal council and several banks.

By 1922, Safed's population had dropped to around 8,700; roughly 60% Muslim, 33% Jewish, and the remainder Christian. Amid rising ethnic tension throughout Mandatory Palestine, Safed's Jews were attacked in the 1929 massacre. By 1948, the population was 13,700, mostly Arab, though the city was proposed to form part of a Jewish state in the United Nations Partition Plan for Palestine. During the 1948 Palestine war, Arab factions attacked and besieged the Jewish quarter, which held out until Jewish paramilitary forces captured the city. Most of the city's predominantly Arab population fled or were expelled as a result of Operation Yiftach and the nearby Ein al-Zeitun massacre. Today, the city has an almost exclusively Jewish population. That year, the city became part of the then-newly established state of Israel.

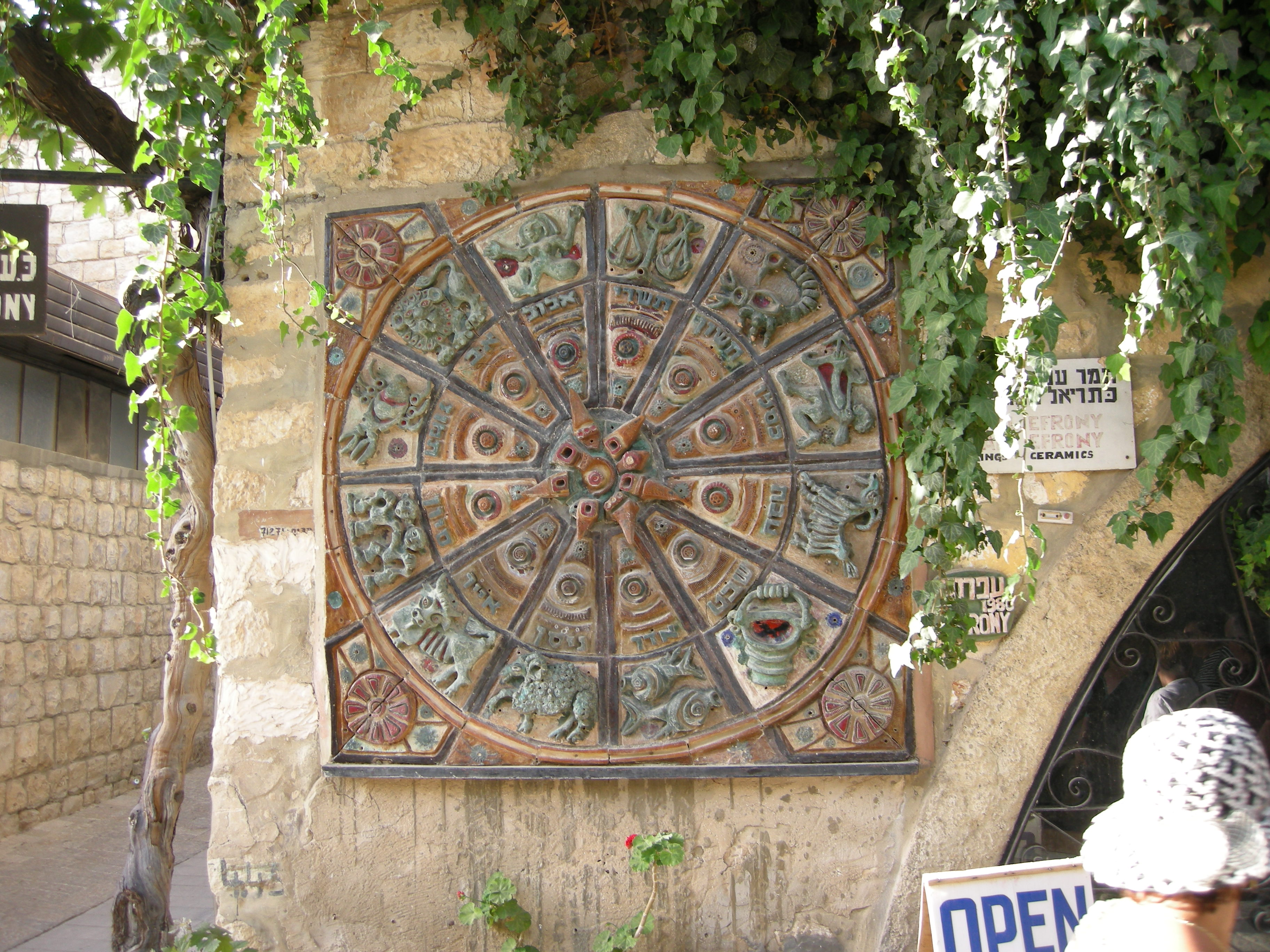
Art in Safed: zodiac on ceramic disk

Safed has a large Haredi community and remains a center for Jewish religious studies. It hosts Ziv Medical Center and the Zefat Academic College. Safed is a major subject in Israeli art; it hosts an Artists' Quarter. Several prominent art movements played a role in the city, most notably the School of Paris. However the Artists' quarter has declined since its golden age in the second half of the 20th century. Due to its high elevation, the city has warm summers and cold, often snowy winters. Its mild climate and scenic views have made Safed a popular holiday resort frequented by Israelis and foreign visitors. In 2024 it had a population of 38,687.

== Biblical reference ==
Legend has it that Safed was founded by a son of Noah after the Flood in Genesis. According to the Judges 1:17, the area where Safed is located was assigned to the tribe of Naphtali.

It has been suggested that Jesus' assertion that "a city that is set on a hill cannot be hidden" referred to Safed.

== History ==
=== Antiquity ===
Safed has been identified with Sepph, a fortified town in the Upper Galilee mentioned in the writings of the Roman-Jewish historian Josephus. Safed is mentioned in the Jerusalem Talmud as one of five elevated spots where fires were lit to announce the New Moon and festivals during the Second Temple period.

=== Crusader era ===
==== Pre-Crusader village and tower ====
There is scarce information about Safed before the Crusader conquest. A document from the Cairo Geniza, composed in 1034, mentions a transaction made in Tiberias in 1023 by a certain Jew, Musa ben Hiba ben Salmun with the nisba (Arabic descriptive suffix) "al-Safati" (of Safed), indicating the presence of a Jewish community living alongside Muslims in Safed in the 11th century. According to the Muslim historian Ibn Shaddad (d. 1285), at the beginning of the 12th century, a "flourishing village" beneath a tower called Burj Yatim had existed at the site of Safed on the eve of the Crusaders' capture of the area in 1101–1102 and that "nothing" about the village was mentioned in "the early Islamic history books". Although Ibn Shaddad mistakenly attributes the tower's construction to the Knights Templar, the modern historian Ronnie Ellenblum asserts that the tower was likely built during the early Muslim period (mid-7th–11th centuries).

==== First Crusader period ====
The Frankish chronicler William of Tyre noted the presence of a burgus (tower) in Safed, which he called "Castrum Saphet" or "Sephet", in 1157. Safed was the seat of a castellany (area governed by a castle) by at least 1165, when its governor was Fulk, constable of Tiberias. The castle of Safed was purchased from Fulk by King Amalric of Jerusalem in 1168. He subsequently reinforced the castle and transferred it to the Templars in the same year. Theoderich the Monk, describing his visit to the area in 1172, noted that the expanded fortification of the castle of Safed was meant to check the raids of the Turks (the Turkic Zengid dynasty ruled the area east of the Kingdom). Testifying to the considerable expansion of the castle, the chronicler Jacques de Vitry (d. 1240) wrote that it was practically built anew. The remains of Fulk's castle can now be found under the citadel excavations, on a hill above the old city.

The castellany of Safed comprised approximately 376 square kilometers (145 mi^{2}). Its western boundary straddled the domains of Acre, including the fief of St. George de la Beyne, which included Sajur and Beit Jann, and the fief of Geoffrey le Tor, which included Akbara and Hurfeish, and in the southwest ran north of Maghar and Sallama. Its northern boundary was marked by the Nahal Dishon (Wadi al-Hindaj) stream, its southern boundary was likely formed near Wadi al-Amud, separating it from the fief of Tiberias, while its eastern limits were the marshes of the Hula Valley and upper Jordan Valley. There were several Jewish communities in the castellany of Safed, as testified in the accounts of Jewish pilgrims and chroniclers between 1120 and 1293. Benjamin of Tudela, who visited the town in 1170, does not record any Jews living in Safed proper.

==== Ayyubid interregnum ====
Safed was captured by the Ayyubids led by Sultan Saladin in 1188 after a month-long siege, following the Battle of Hattin in 1187. Saladin allowed its residents to relocate to Tyre. He granted Safed and Tiberias as an iqta (fief) to Sa'd al-Din Mas'ud ibn Mubarak (d. 1211), the son of his niece, after which it was bequeathed to Sa'd al-Din's son Ahmad. Samuel ben Samson, who visited the town in 1210, mentions a Jewish community of at least fifty there. He also noted that two Muslims guarded and maintained the cave tomb of a rabbi, Hanina ben Horqano, in Safed. The iqta of Safed was taken from the family of Sa'd al-Din by the Ayyubid emir of Damascus, al-Mu'azzam Isa, in 1217. Two years later, during the Crusader siege of Damietta, al-Mu'azzam Isa had Safed's castle dismantled to prevent its capture and reuse by potential future Crusaders.

==== Second Crusader period ====
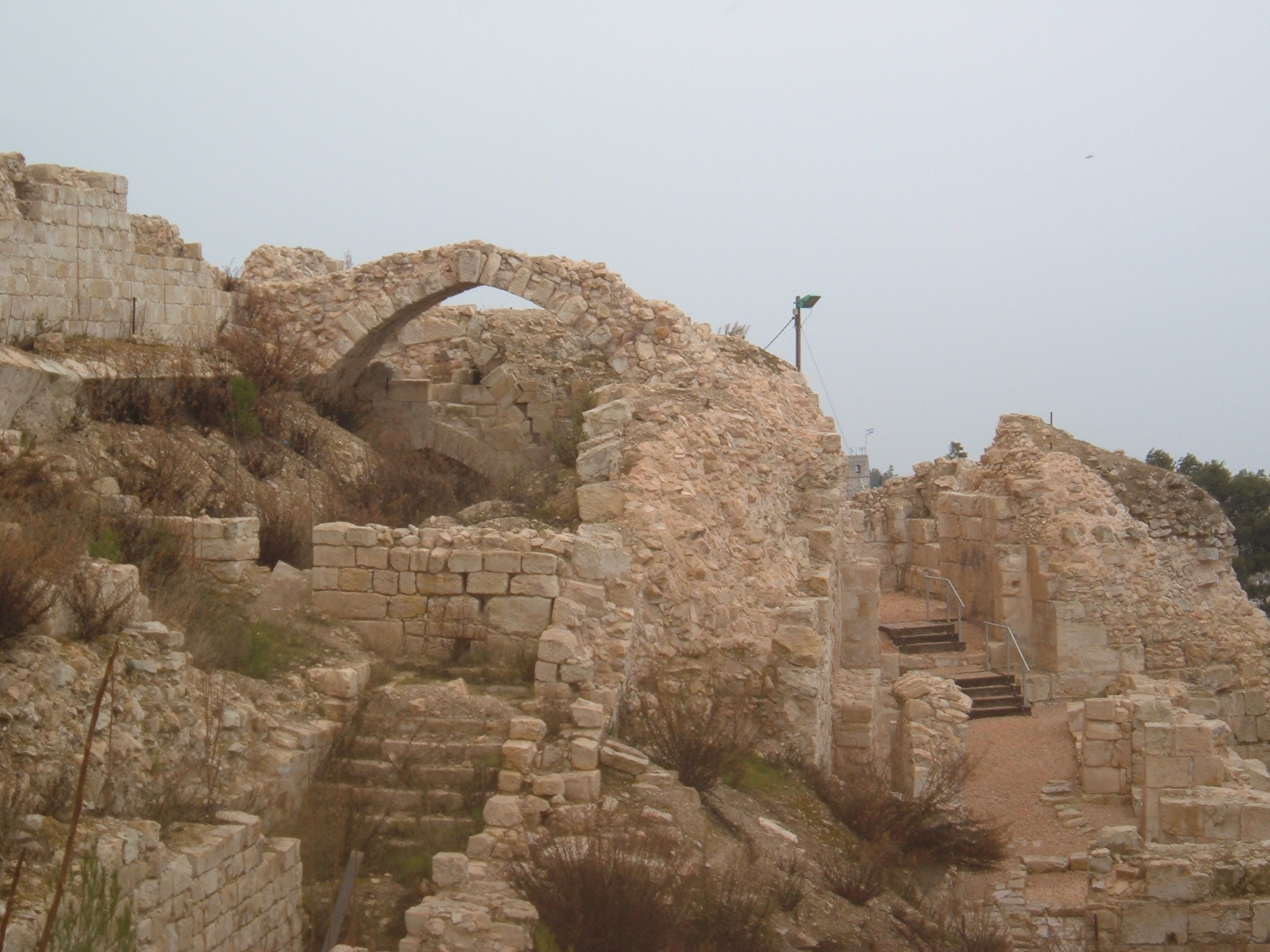
Ruins of the Citadel of Safed

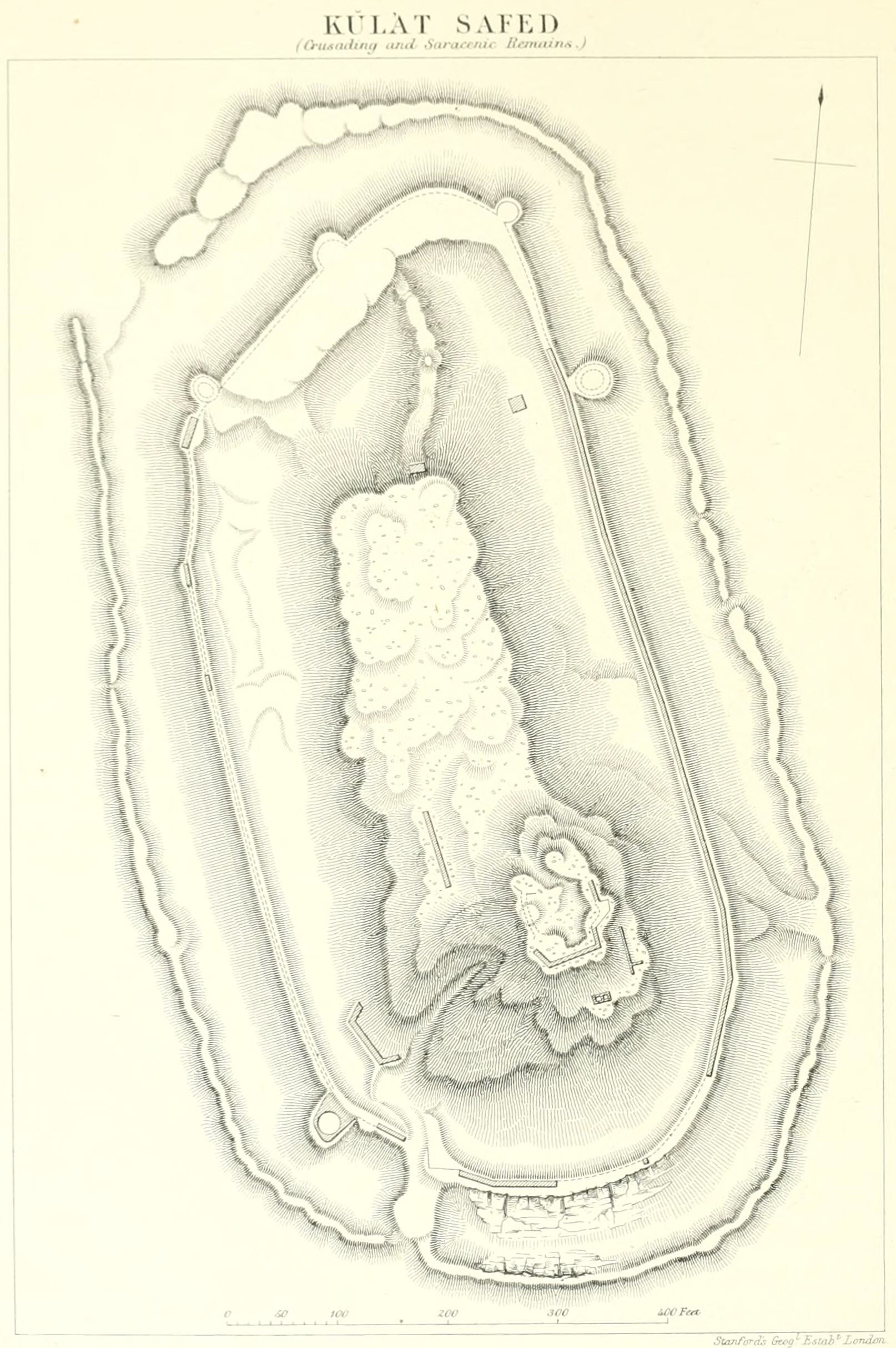
1871–1877 PEF Survey of Palestine map

The Crusader-Mamluk-era fortress of Safed

Per the 1240 treaty between the Crusader leader Theobald I of Navarre and the Ayyubid al-Salih Ismail, Emir of Damascus, Safed passed to Crusader control. Afterward, the Templars rebuilt the Citadel of Safed, with efforts spearheaded by Benedict of Alignan, Bishop of Marseille. The rebuilding is recorded in a short treatise, De constructione castri Saphet, from the early 1260s. The reconstruction was completed at the considerable expense of 40,000 bezants in 1243. The new fortress was larger than the original, with a capacity for 2,200 soldiers in time of war, and with a resident force of 1,700 in peacetime. The garrison's goods and services were provided by the town or large village growing rapidly beneath the fortress, which contained a market, "numerous inhabitants" and was protected by the fortress. The settlement also benefited from trade with travelers on the route between Acre and the Jordan Valley, which passed through Safed.

=== Mamluk period ===
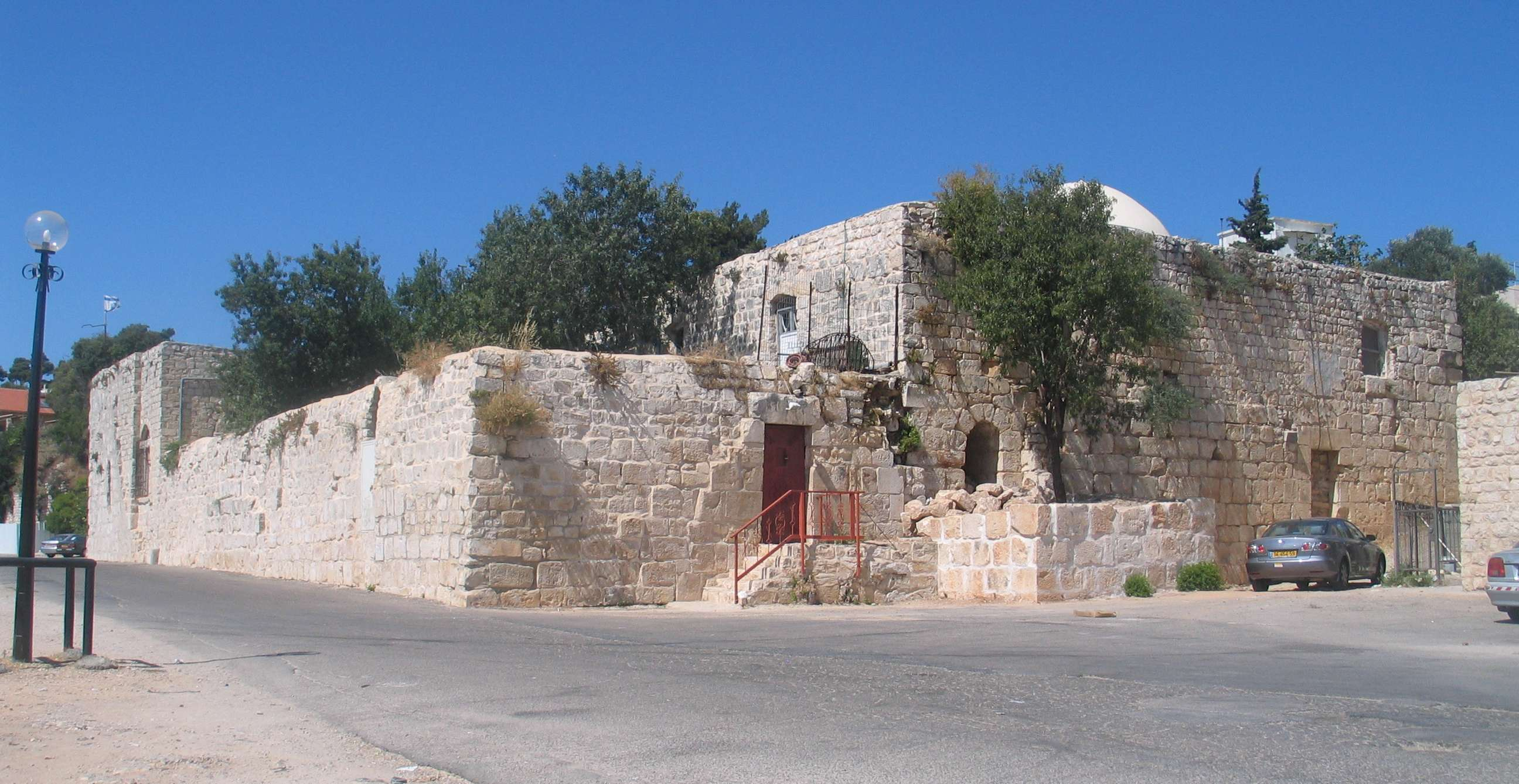
The Red Mosque in Safed, 2001. It was originally built by the Mamluk sultan Baybars in 1275, and renovated or expanded by the Ottomans in 1671/72

The Ayyubids of Egypt had been supplanted by the Mamluks in 1250 and the Mamluk sultan Baybars entered Syria with his army in 1261. Thereafter, he led a series of campaigns over several years against Crusader strongholds across the Syrian coastal mountains. Safed, with its position overlooking the Jordan River and allowing the Crusaders early warnings of Muslim troop movements in the area, had been a consistent aggravation for the Muslim regional powers. After a six-week siege, Baybars captured Safed in July 1266, after which he had nearly the entire garrison killed. The siege occurred during a Mamluk military campaign to subdue Crusader strongholds in Palestine and followed a failed attempt to capture the Crusaders' coastal stronghold of Acre. Unlike the Crusader fortresses along the coastline, which were demolished upon their capture by the Mamluks, Baybars spared the fortress of Safed. He likely preserved it because of the strategic value stemming from its location on a high mountain and its isolation from other Crusader fortresses. Baybars determined that in the event of a renewed Crusader invasion of the coastal region, a strongly fortified Safed could serve as an ideal headquarters to confront the Crusader threat. In 1268, he had the fortress repaired, expanded and strengthened. He commissioned numerous building works in the town of Safed, including caravanserais, markets and baths, and converted the town's church into a mosque. The mosque, called Jami al-Ahmar (the Red Mosque), was completed in 1275. By the end of Baybars's reign, Safed had developed into a prosperous town and fortress.

Baybars assigned Emir Ala al-Din Kandaghani, at the head of fifty-four mamluks, to manage Safed and its dependencies. The city was made the administrative center of Mamlakat Safad, one of seven mamlakas (provinces), whose governors were typically appointed from Cairo, which made up Mamluk Syria. Initially, its jurisdiction corresponded roughly with the Crusader castellany. After the fall of the Montfort Castle to the Mamluks in 1271, the castle and its dependency, the Shaghur district, were incorporated into Mamlakat Safad. The territorial jurisdiction of the mamlaka eventually spanned the entire Galilee and the lands further south down to Jenin.

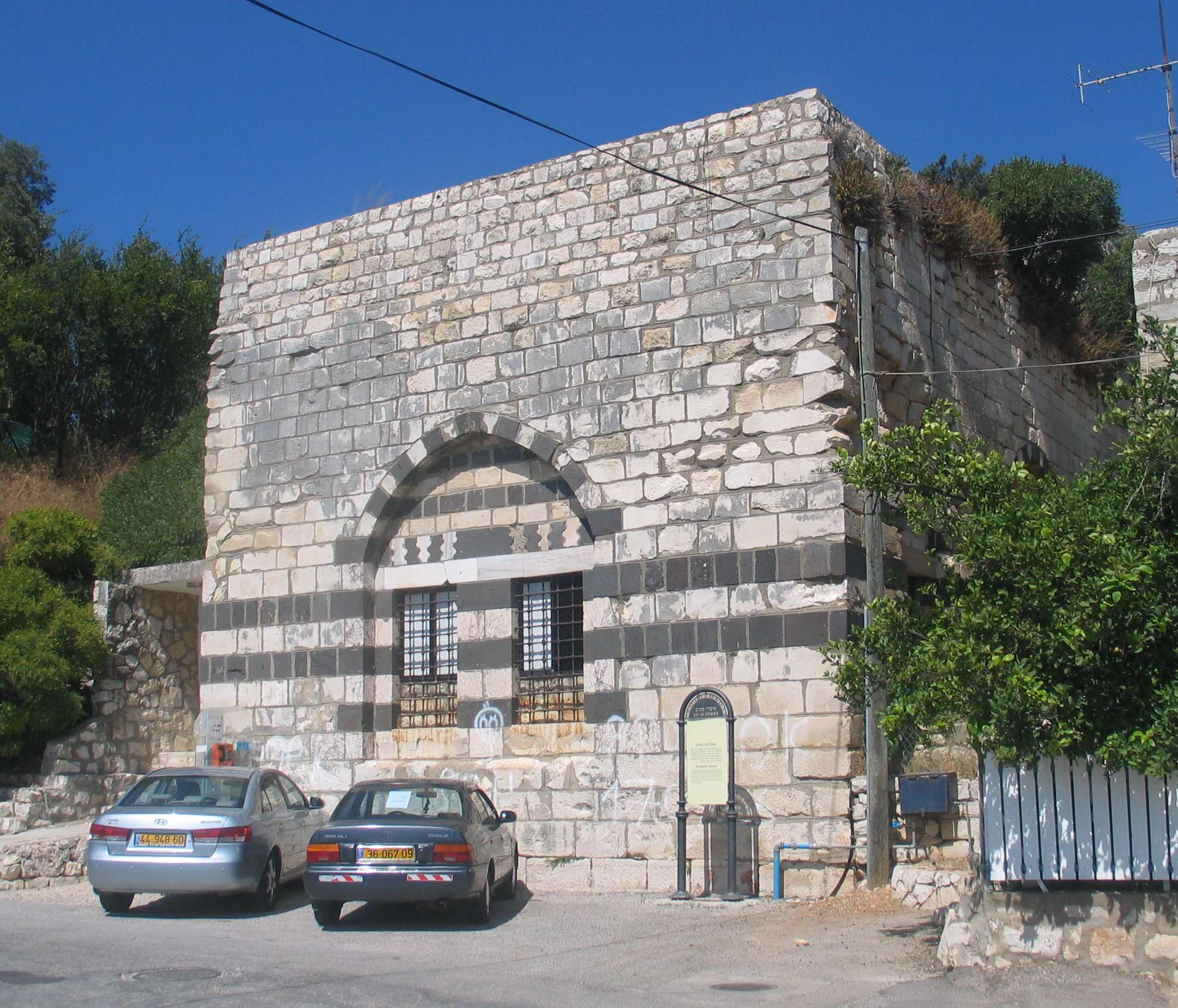
The Mamluk mausoleum of Zawiyat Banat Hamid, originally built in 1372

The geographer al-Dimashqi, who died in Safed in 1327, wrote around 1300 that Baybars built a "round tower and called it Kullah ..." after leveling the old fortress. The tower was built in three stories, and provided with provisions, halls, and magazines. Under the structure, a cistern collected enough rainwater to regularly supply the garrison. The governor of Safed, Emir Baktamur al-Jukandar (the Polomaster; r. 1309–1311), built a mosque later called after him in the northeastern section of the city. The geographer Abu'l Fida (1273–1331), the ruler of Hama, described Safed as follows:

[Safed] was a town of medium size. It has a very strongly built castle, which dominates the Lake of Tabariyyah [Sea of Galilee]. There are underground watercourses, which bring drinking-water up to the castle-gate...Its suburbs cover three hills... Since the place was conquered by Al Malik Adh Dhahir [Baybars] from the Franks [Crusaders], it has been made the central station for the troops who guard all the coast-towns of that district."

The native qadi (Islamic head judge) of Safed, Shams al-Din al-Uthmani, composed a text about Safed called Ta'rikh Safad (the History of Safed) during the rule of its governor Emir Alamdar (r. 1372–1376). The extant parts of the work consisted of ten folios largely devoted to Safed's distinguishing qualities, its dependent villages, agriculture, trade and geography, with no information about its history. His account reveals the city's dominant features were its citadel, the Red Mosque and its towering position over the surrounding landscape. He noted Safed lacked "regular urban planning", madrasas (schools of Islamic law), ribats (hostels for military volunteers) and defensive walls, and that its houses were clustered in disarray and its streets were not distinguishable from its squares. He attributed the city's shortcomings to the dearth of generous patrons. A device for transporting buckets of water called the satura existed in the city mainly to supply the soldiers of the citadel; surplus water was distributed to the city's residents. Al-Uthmani praised the natural beauty of Safed, its therapeutic air, and noted that its residents took strolls in the surrounding gorges and ravines.

The Black Death brought about a decline in the population in Safed from 1348 onward. There is little available information about the city and its dependencies during the last century of Mamluk rule (c. 1418 – c. 1516), though travelers' accounts describe a general decline precipitated by famine, plagues, natural disasters and political instability. In 1481, Joseph Mantabia reported that 300 Jewish families lived in Safed and its surrounding villages. While the accuracy of this figure is uncertain, it reflects the town's growing importance as a center of Jewish life, particularly with the arrival of Sephardic Jews due to persecutions in Portugal and Spain.

=== Ottoman era ===
==== Sixteenth-century prosperity ====
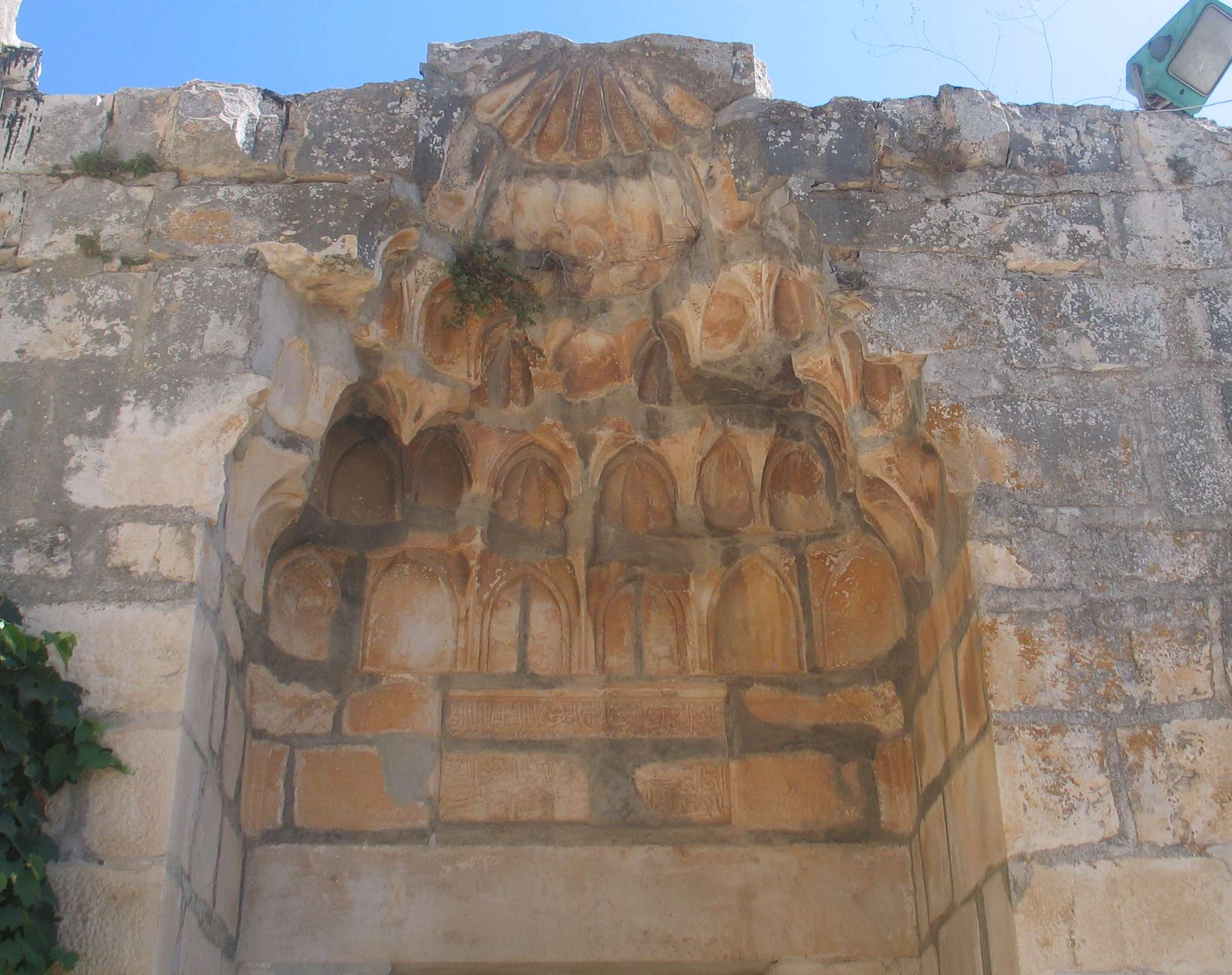
The Red Mosque

The Ottomans conquered Mamluk Syria in the Ottoman-Mamluk War following their victory at the Battle of Marj Dabiq in northern Syria in 1516. Safed's inhabitants sent the keys of the town citadel to Sultan Selim I after he captured Damascus. No fighting was recorded around Safed, which was bypassed by Selim's army on the way to the Mamluk Sultanate's capital in Egypt.

The sultan had placed the district of Safed under the jurisdiction of the Mamluk governor of Damascus, Janbirdi al-Ghazali, who defected to the Ottomans. Rumors in 1517 that Selim was slain by the Mamluks precipitated a revolt against the newly-appointed Ottoman governor by the townspeople of Safed, which resulted in wide-scale killings, many of which targeted the city's Jews, who were viewed as sympathizers of the Ottomans. Safed became the capital of the Safed Sanjak, roughly corresponding with Mamlakat Safad but excluding most of the Jezreel Valley and the area of Atlit, part of the larger province of Damascus Eyalet.

In 1525/26, the population of Safed consisted of 633 Muslim families, 40 Muslim bachelors, 26 Muslim religious persons, nine Muslim disabled, 232 Jewish families, and 60 military families. In 1549, under Sultan Suleiman the Magnificent, a wall was constructed and troops were garrisoned to protect the city. In 1553/54, the population consisted of 1,121 Muslim households, 222 Muslim bachelors, 54 Muslim religious leaders, 716 Jewish households, 56 Jewish bachelors, and 9 disabled persons. At least in the 16th century, Safed was the only kasaba (city) in the sanjak and in 1555 was divided into nineteen mahallas (quarters), seven Muslim and twelve Jewish. The total population of Safed rose from 926 households in 1525–26 to 1,931 households in 1567–1568. Among these, the Jewish population rose from a mere 233 households in 1525 to 945 households in 1567–1568. The Muslim quarters were Sawawin, located west of the fortress; Khandaq (the moat); Ghazzawiyah, which had likely been settled by Gazans; Jami' al-Ahmar (the Red Mosque), located south of the fortress and named for the local mosque; al-Akrad, which dated to the Middle Ages and continued to exist through the 19th century, and whose inhabitants mainly were Kurds; al-Wata (the lower), the southernmost quarter of Safed and situated below the city; and al-Suq, named after the market or mosque located within the quarter.

The city itself became a center of Sefardic Jews who had fled the Spanish Empire and been welcomed into the Ottoman Empire from the sixteenth to 18th centuries. The Jewish quarters were all situated west of the fortress. Each quarter was named for the place of origin of its inhabitants: Purtuqal (Portuguese Empire), Qurtubah (Cordoba), Qastiliyah (Castille), Musta'rib (Jews of local, Arabic-speaking origin), Magharibah (the Maghreb), Araghun ma' Qatalan (Aragon and Catalonia), Majar (Hungary), Puliah (Apulia), Qalabriyah (Calabria), Sibiliyah (Seville), Taliyan (Italian) and Alaman (German).

In the 15th and 16th centuries, there were several well-known Sufis (mystics) of ibn Arabi living in Safed. The Sufi sage Ahmad al-Asadi (1537–1601) established a zawiya (Sufi lodge) called the Sadr Mosque in the city. Safed became a center of Jewish mysticism, Kabbalah, as well, during the 16th century.

After the expulsion of the Jews from Spain in 1492, many prominent rabbis found their way to Safed, among them the Kabbalists Isaac Luria and Moses ben Jacob Cordovero; Joseph Caro, the author of the Shulchan Aruch; and Solomon Alkabetz, composer of the Shabbat hymn "Lekha Dodi".

The kabbalistic response to the trauma of the exile varied widely, ranging from a quietistic approach adopted by the Italian and North African kabbalists, to a more activist apocalyptic approach which sought signs of the imminent redemption. The expulsion was seen by many as the tribulation that would herald the beginning of the messianic age as foretold in rabbinic literature. The spiritualization of religious life culminated in the creative outburst of religious innovation in Safed in the second half of the sixteenth century as a response to the expulsion. This spiritual revolution spread from Safed and transformed the practice of Judaism throughout the Jewish world.

The influx of Sephardic Jews—reaching its peak under the rule of sultans Suleiman the Magnificent and Selim II—made Safed a global center for Jewish learning and a regional center for trade throughout the 15th and 16th centuries. Sephardi Jews and other Jewish immigrants by then outnumbered Musta'arabi Jews in the city.

During this period, the Jewish community developed the textile industry in Safed, transforming the town into an important and lucrative wool production and textile manufacturing centre. There were more than 7,000 Jews in Safed in 1576 when Murad III proclaimed the forced deportation of 1,000 wealthy Jewish families to Cyprus to boost the island's economy. There is no evidence that the edict or a second one issued the following year for removing 500 families, was enforced. In 1584, there were 32 synagogues registered in the town.

A Hebrew printing press, the first in West Asia, was established in Safed in 1577 by Eliezer ben Isaac Ashkenazi of Prague and his son, Isaac.

==== Political decline, attacks and natural disasters ====
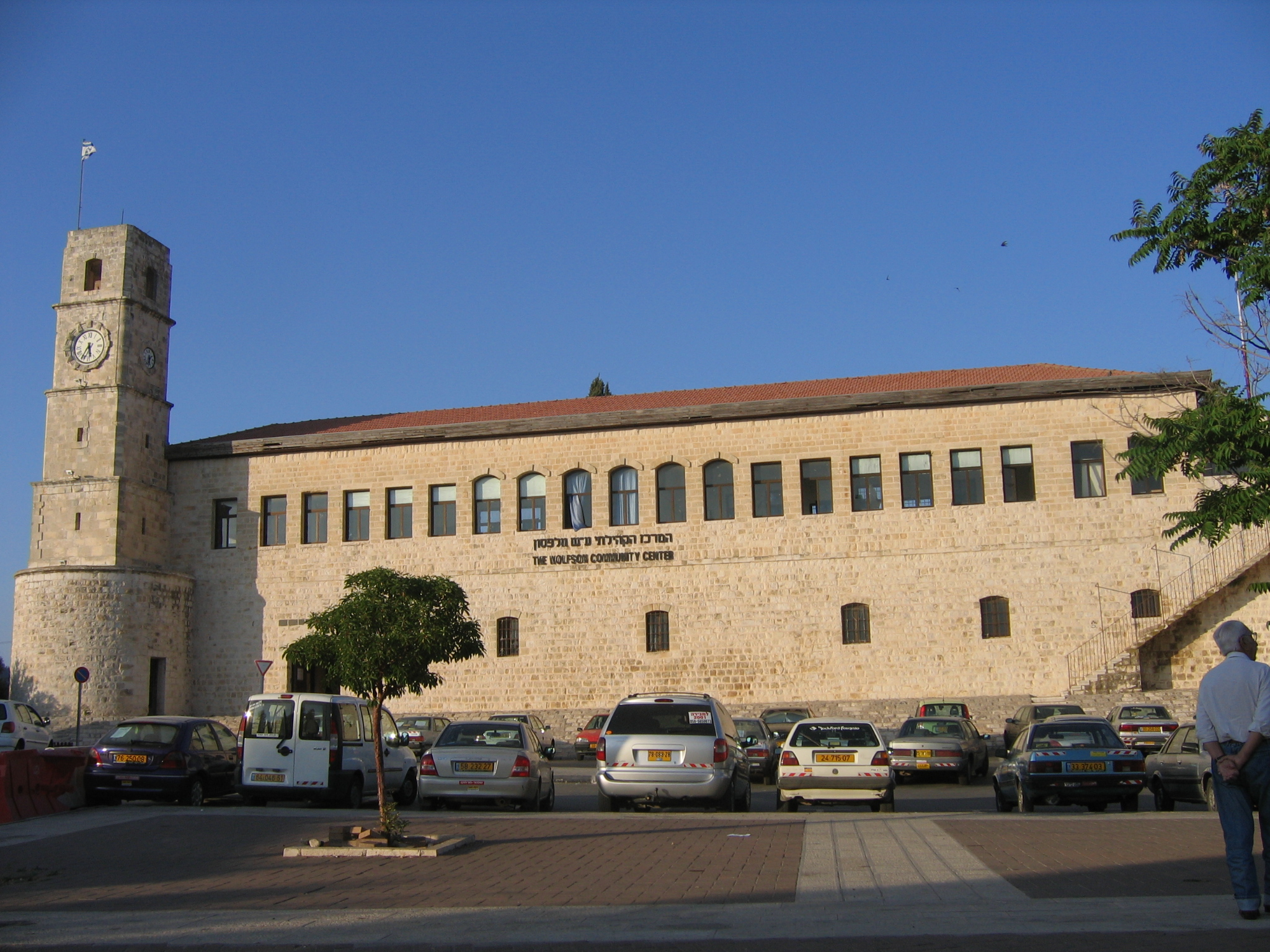
Originally built as a caravanserai by the Ottomans in the mid-1700s, the "Saraya" (house of the governor) currently serves as a community centre

By the early part of the 17th century, Safed was a small town. In 1602, the paramount chief of the Druze in Mount Lebanon, Fakhr al-Din II of the Ma'n dynasty, was appointed the sanjak-bey (district governor) of Safed, in addition to his governorship of neighbouring Sidon-Beirut Sanjak to the north. In the preceding years, the Safed Sanjak had entered a state of ruin and desolation and was often the scene of conflict between the local Druze and Shia Muslim peasants and the Ottoman authorities. By 1605, Fakhr al-Din had established peace and security in the sanjak, with highway brigandage and Bedouin raids having ceased under his watch. Trade and agriculture consequently thrived and the population prospered. He formed close relations with the city's Sunni Muslim ulama (religious scholars), particularly the mufti, al-Khalidi al-Safadi of the Hanafi school of fiqh (Islamic jurisprudence), who became his practical court historian.

The Ottomans drove Fakhr al-Din into European exile in 1613, but his son Ali became governor in 1615. Fakhr al-Din returned to his domains in 1618 and five years later regained the governorship of Safed, which the Ma'n dynasty had lost, after his victory against the governor of Damascus at the Battle of Anjar. In c. 1625, the orientalist Franciscus Quaresmius spoke of Safed being inhabited "chiefly by Hebrews, who had their synagogues and schools, and for whose sustenance contributions were made by the Jews in other parts of the world." According to the historian Louis Finkelstein, the Jewish community of Safed was plundered by the Druze under Mulhim ibn Yunus, nephew of Fakhr al-Din. Five years later, Fakhr al-Din was routed by the Ottoman governor of Damascus, Mulhim abandoned Safed, and its Jewish residents returned.

The Druze again attacked the Jews of Safed in 1656. During the power struggle between Fakhr al-Din's heirs (1658–1667), each faction attacked Safed. In the intra-communal turmoil among the Druze following the death of Mulhim, the 1660 destruction of Safed targeted the Jews there and in Tiberias; only a few of the former Jewish residents returned to the city before 1662. Survivors relocated mainly to Sidon or Jerusalem. Safed Sanjak and the neighbouring Sidon-Beirut Sanjak to the north were administratively separated from Damascus in 1660 to form the Sidon Eyalet, of which Safed was briefly the capital. The province was created by the imperial government to check the power of the Druze of Mount Lebanon, as well as the Shia of Jabal Amil.

As nearby Tiberias remained desolate for several decades, Safed gained a key position among Galilean Jewish communities. In 1665, Sabbatai Zevi's Messianic movement arrived in Safed. In the 1670s, the account of the Turkish traveller Evliya Çelebi recorded that Safed contained three caravanserais, several mosques, seven zawiyas, and six hammams. Çelebi devotes particular attention to Safed's Jewish population, whom he portrays as the city's dominant community. He reports that Jews outnumbered Muslims, spread across seven quarters paying capitation tax for 9,000 people, though the community had collapsed to just 2,000 in his day, He claims that as many as 70,000 Jews once lived there before migrating to Salonica, though this number is clearly exaggerated and possibly reflects a memory of the city's heydey. He explains this Jewish presence by identifying Safed as the original homeland of the Children of Israel, going so far as to compare its significance for Jews to that of the Kaaba for Muslims, a comparison for which he apologizes. He also records that Safed had once been renowned for manufacturing felt, though this industry shrunk from a claimed 3,000 workshops to forty. He claimed that all the prophets grew up there and that many lay buried in the city's soil, with thousands of saints and pious men interred in the garden of Jacob's shrine, the "House of Sorrows." He mentioned a place called the Grotto of Qetur beneath the now-ruined citadel, where Jews visited a site tradition assigned to the sons of Esau, as well as twice-weekly nighttime dhikr ceremonies performed by dervishes amid candles, oil lamps, and tambourines, and the nearby Mount Canaan, where townspeople went for outings and to enjoy the scenery.

The Red Mosque was restored by Safed's governor Salih Bey in 1671/72, at which point it measured about 120 by 80 feet (37 m × 24 m), had an all-masonry interior, a cistern to collect rainwater in the winter for drinking and a tall minaret over its southern entrance; the minaret had been destroyed before the end of the 17th century.

The Tiberias-based sheikh Daher al-Umar of the local Arab Zaydan clan, whose father Umar al-Zaydani had been the governor and tax farmer of Safed in 1702–1706, wrested control of Safed and its tax farm from its native strongman, Muhammad Naf'i, through military pressure and diplomacy by 1740. The Naf'i, Shahin, and Murad families continued to farm the taxes of Safed and its countryside into the 1760s as Daher's subordinates. By the 1760s, Daher entrusted Safed to his son Ali, who made the town his headquarters. After Daher was killed by Ottoman imperial forces, the governor of Sidon, Jazzar Pasha, moved to oust Daher's sons from their Galilee strongholds. Ali made a final, unsuccessful stand against Jazzar Pasha from Safed, which was afterward captured and garrisoned by the governor. The rise of Acre, established by Daher as his capital in 1750 and which served as the capital of the Sidon Eyalet under Jazzar Pasha (1775–1804) and his successors, Sulayman Pasha al-Adil (1805–1819) and Abdullah Pasha (1820–1831), contributed to the political decline of Safed. It became a subdistrict center with limited local influence, belonging to the Acre Sanjak .

Underdevelopment and a series of natural disasters further contributed to Safed's decline during the 17th–mid-19th centuries. An outbreak of plague decimated the population in 1742 and the Near East earthquakes of 1759 left the city in ruins, killing 200 residents. An influx of Russian Jews in 1776 and 1781, and of Lithuanian Jews of the Perushim movement in 1809 and 1810, reinvigorated the Jewish community. In 1812, another plague killed 80% of the Jewish population. Following Abdullah Pasha of Acre's ordered killing of his Jewish vizier Haim Farhi, who served the same post under Jazzar and Sulayman, the governor imprisoned the Jewish residents of Safed on 12 August 1820, accusing them of tax evasion under the concealment of Farhi; they were released upon paying a ransom. The war between Abdullah Pasha and the influential Farhi brothers in Constantinople and Damascus in 1822–1823 prompted Jewish flight from the Galilee in general, though by 1824 Jewish immigrants were steadily moving to the city.

The forces of Muhammad Ali of Egypt wrested control of the Levant from the Ottomans in 1831 and in the same year many Jews who had fled the Galilee, including Safed, under Abdullah Pasha returned as a result of Muhammad Ali's liberal policies toward Jews. Safed was raided by Druze in 1833 at the approach of Ibrahim Pasha, the Egyptian governor of the Levant. In the following year, the Muslim notables of the city, led by Salih al-Tarshihi, opposed to the Egyptian policy of conscription, joined the peasants' revolt in Palestine. During the revolt, rebels plundered the city as part of a month-long attack, in which Safed's Jewish community was the target of murder, rape and looting of property and religious artifacts, as well as the destruction of homes, synagogues and hundreds of Torah scrolls. Emir Bashir Shihab II of Mount Lebanon and his Druze fighters entered its environs in support of the Egyptians and compelled Safed's leaders to surrender. The Galilee earthquake of 1837 killed about half of Safed's 4,000-strong Jewish community, destroyed all fourteen of its synagogues and prompted the flight of 600 Perushim for Jerusalem; the surviving Sephardic and Hasidic Jews mostly remained. Among the 2,158 residents of Safed who had died, 1,507 were Ottoman subjects, the rest foreign citizens. The Jewish quarter was situated on the hillside and was particularly hard hit; the southern and Muslim section of the town experienced considerably less damage. The following year, in 1838, Druze rebels and local Muslims raided Safed for three days.

==== Tanzimat reforms and revival ====
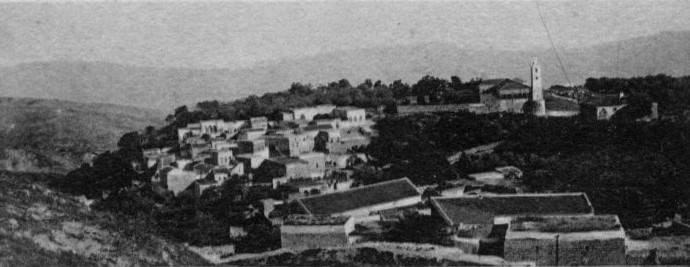
Safed in the 19th century

Ottoman rule was restored across the Levant in 1840. The Empire-wide Tanzimat reforms, which were first adopted in the 1840s, brought about a steady rise in Safed's population and economy. In 1849 Safed had a total estimated population of 5,000, of whom 2,940–3,440 were Muslims, 1,500-2,000 were Jews and 60 were Christians. The population was estimated at 7,000 in 1850–1855, of whom 2,500–3,000 were Jews. The Jewish population increased in the last half of the 19th century by immigration from Persia, Morocco, and Algeria. Moses Montefiore (d. 1885) visited Safed seven times and financed much of the rebuilding of Safed's synagogues and Jewish houses.

In 1864 the Sidon Eyalet was absorbed into the new province of Syria Vilayet. In the new province, Safed remained part of the Acre Sanjak and served as the center of a kaza (third-level subdivision), whose jurisdiction covered the villages around the city and the subdistrict of Mount Meron (Jabal Jarmaq). In the Ottoman survey of Syria in 1871, Safed had 1,395 Muslim households, 1,197 Jewish households and three Christian households. The survey recorded a relatively high number of businesses in the city, namely 227 shops, fifteen mills, fourteen bakeries and four olive oil factories, an indicator of Safed's long-established role as an economic hub for the people of the Upper Galilee, the Hula Valley, the Golan Heights and parts of modern-day South Lebanon. Through the late 19th century, Safed's merchants served as middlemen in the Galilee grain trade, selling the wheat, pulses and fruit grown by the peasants of the Galilee to the traders of Acre, who in turn exported at least part of the merchandise to Europe. Safed also maintained extensive trade with the port of Tyre. The bulk of trade in Safed, which was traditionally dominated by the city's Jews, largely passed to its Muslim merchants during the late 19th century, particularly trade with the local villagers; Muslim traders offered higher credit to the peasants and were able to obtain government assistance for debt repayments. The wealth of Safed's Muslims increased and a number of the city's leading Muslim families made an opportunity from the Ottoman Land Code of 1858 to purchase extensive tracts around Safed. The major Muslim landowning clans were the Soubeh, Murad and Qaddura. The latter owned about 50,000 dunams (50 km^{2}; 19 sq mi) toward the end of the century, including eight villages around Safed.

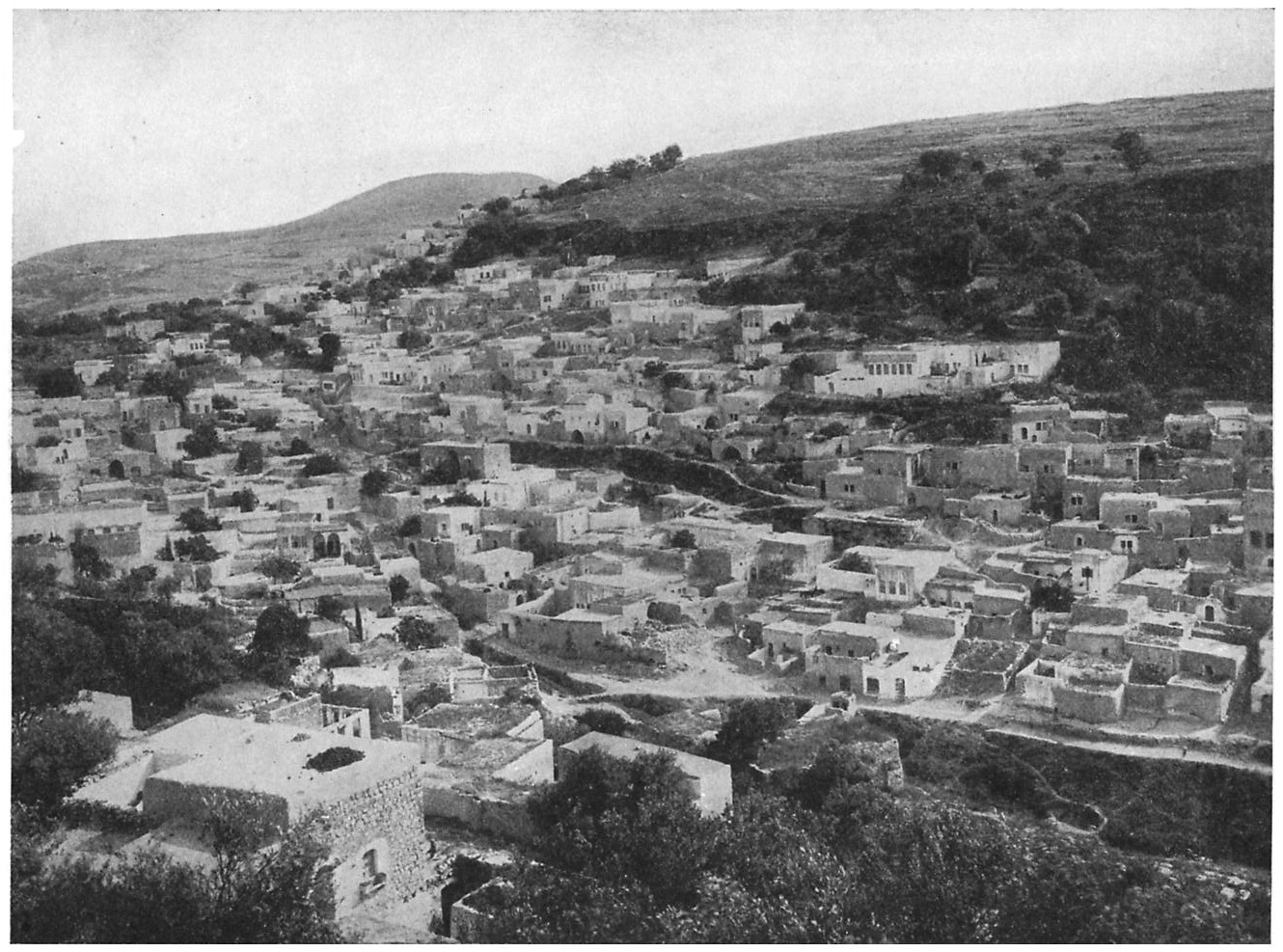
Muslim quarter of Safed circa 1908

In 1878 the municipal council of Safed was established. In 1888 the Acre Sanjak, including the Safed Kaza, became part of the new province of Beirut Vilayet, an administrative state of affairs which persisted until the Empire's fall in 1918. The centralization and stability brought by the imperial reforms solidified the political status and practical influence of Safed in the Upper Galilee. The Ottomans developed Safed into a center for Sunni Islam to counterbalance the influence of non-Muslim communities in its environs and the Shia Muslims of Jabal Amil. Along with the three major landowning families, the Muslim ulema (religious scholarly) families of Nahawi, Qadi, Mufti and Naqib comprised the urban elite (a'yan) of the city. The Sunni courts of Safed arbitrated over cases in Akbara, Ein al-Zeitun and as far away as Mejdel Islim. According to the late 19th-century account of British missionary E. W. G. Masterman, the Muslim families of Safed included Kurds, Damascenes, Algerians, Bedouin from the Jordan Valley, and people from the villages around Safed. Many Damascenes had been settled in the city by Baybars when he conquered Safed in 1266. Until the late 19th century the Muslims of Safed maintained strong social and cultural connections with Damascus. The government settled Algerian and Circassian exiles in the countryside of Safed in the 1860s and 1878, respectively, possibly in an effort to strengthen the Muslim character of the area. At least two Muslim families in the city itself, Arabi and Delasi, were of Algerian origin, though they accounted for a small proportion of the city's overall Muslim population. Masterman noted that the Muslims of Safed were conservative, "active and hardy", who "dress[ed] well and move[d] about more than the people from the region of southern Palestine". They lived mainly in three quarters of the city: al-Akrad, whose residents were mostly laborers, Sawawin, home to the Muslim a'yan households and the city's Catholic community, and al-Wata, whose inhabitants were largely shopkeepers and minor traders. The entire Jewish population lived in the Gharbieh (western) quarter.

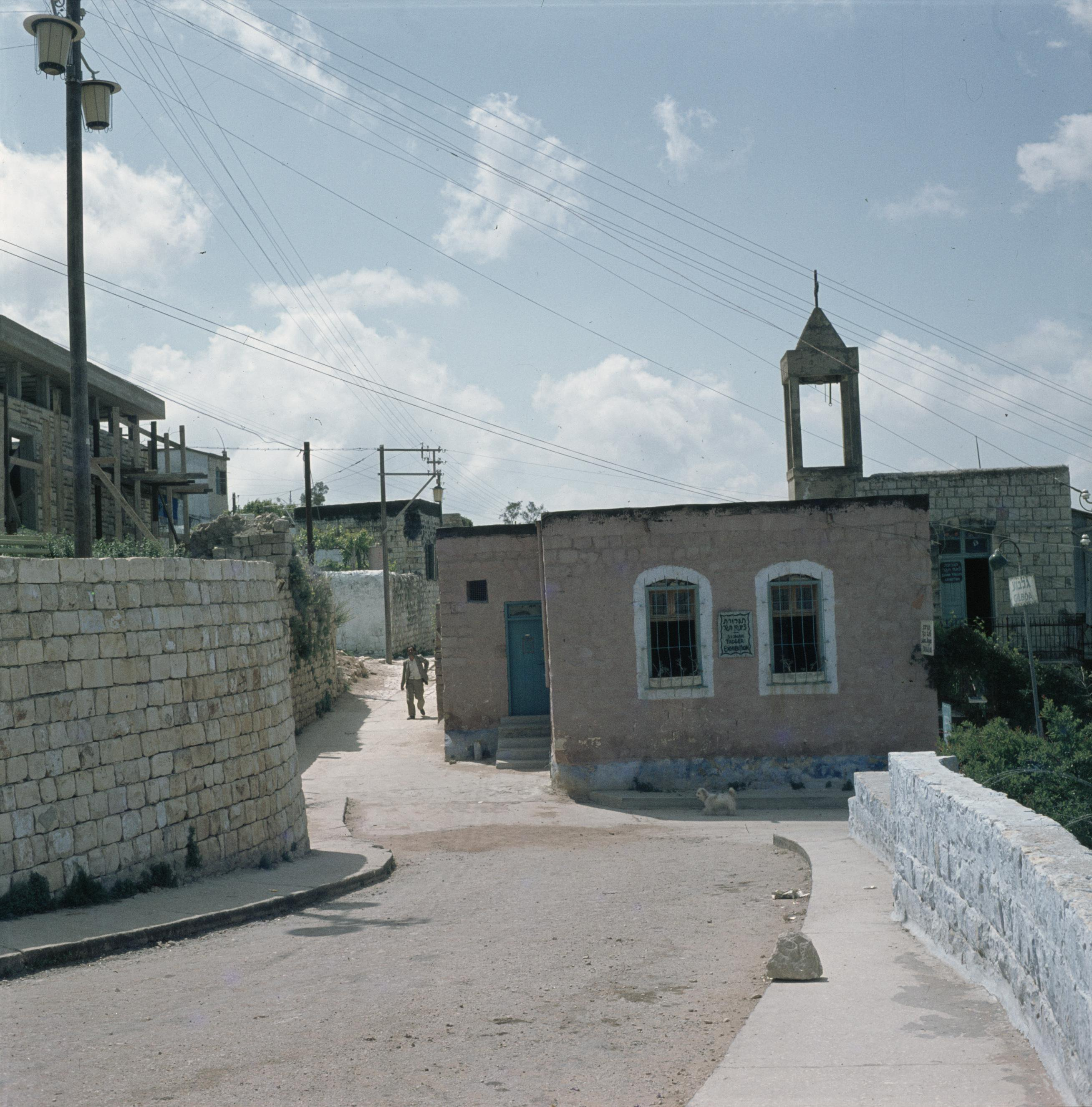
Melkite Greek Catholic Church in Safed

Safed's population reached over 15,000 in 1879, 8,000 of whom were Muslims and 7,000 Jews. A population list from about 1887 showed that Safed had 24,615 inhabitants; 2,650 Jewish households, 2,129 Muslim households and 144 Roman Catholic households. Arab families in Safed whose social status rose as a result of the Tanzimat reforms included the Asadi, whose presence in Safed dated to the 16th century, Hajj Sa'id, Hijazi, Bisht, Hadid, Khouri, a Christian family whose progenitor moved to the city from Mount Lebanon during the 1860 civil war, and Sabbagh, a long-established Christian family in the city related to Daher al-Umar's fiscal adviser Ibrahim al-Sabbagh; many members of these families became officials in the civil service, local administrations or businessmen. When the Ottomans established a branch of the Agricultural Bank in the city in 1897, all of its board members were resident Arabs, the most influential of whom were Husayn Abd al-Rahim Effendi, Hajj Ahmad al-Asadi, As'ad Khouri and Abd al-Latif al-Hajj Sa'id. The latter two also became board members of the Chamber of Commerce and Agriculture branch opened in Safed in 1900. In the last decade of the 19th century, Safed contained 2,000 houses, four mosques, three churches, two public bathhouses, one caravanserai, two public sabils, nineteen mills, seven olive oil presses, ten bakeries, fifteen coffeehouses, forty-five stalls and three shops.

During World War I, Safed suffered from shortages and famine. In particular, Historian Zachary J. Foster has shown that a quarter of the Jewish population died from malnutrition and typhus during the summer of 1916.

=== Mandatory Palestine ===
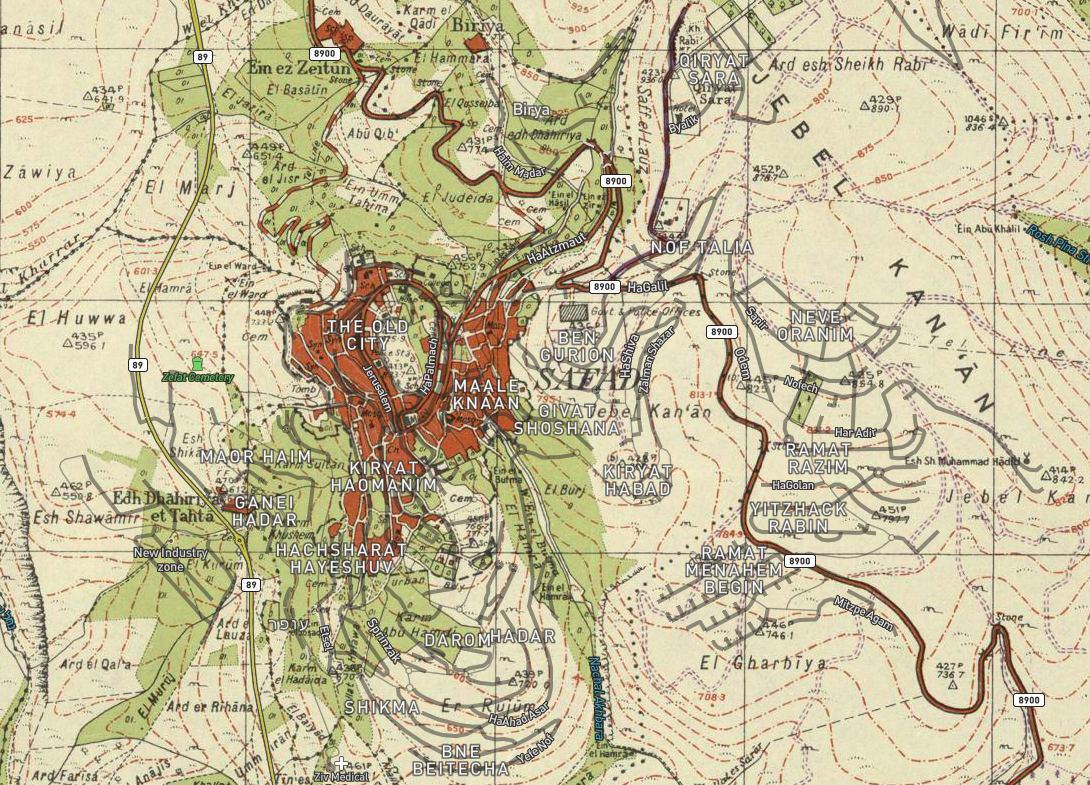
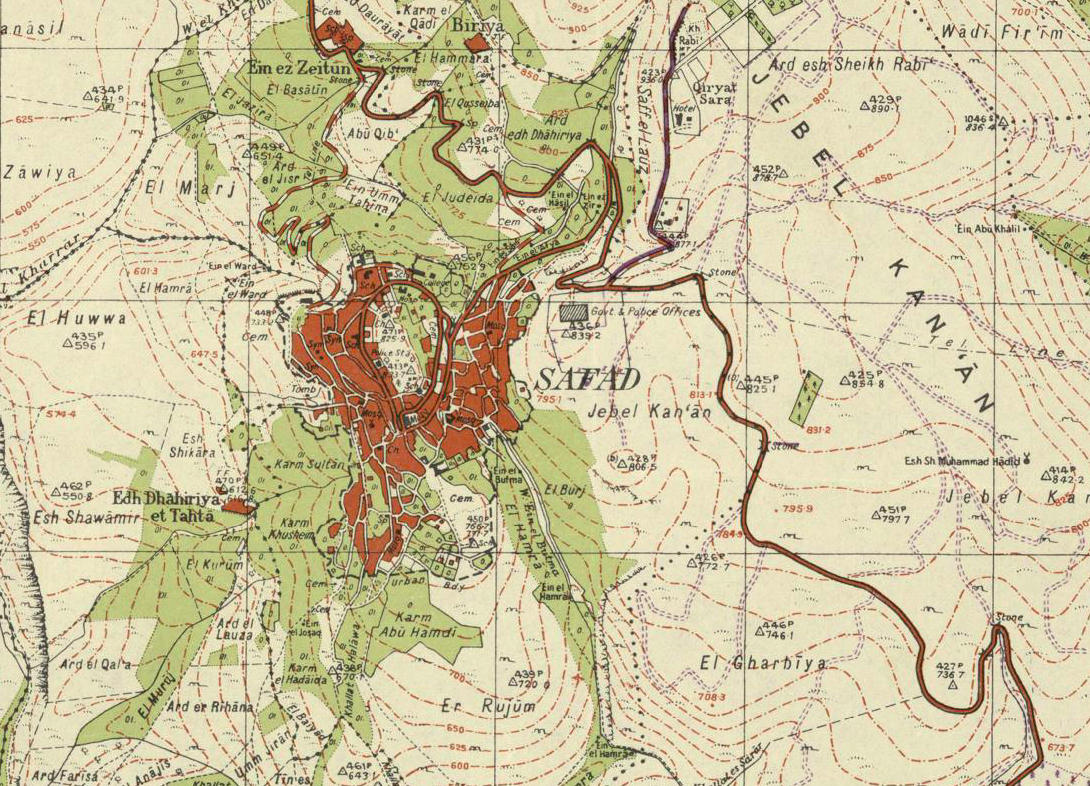
Safed street map (date 2018, white text and light grey streets) overlaid on a Survey of Palestine map (date 1942, black text, red urban areas and black streets), showing the relative locations of Safed to its three Mandate-era satellite villages: Al-Zahiriyya al-Tahta, Ein al-Zeitun and Biriyya.

Safed was the centre of Safad Subdistrict. According to a census conducted in 1922 by the British Mandate authorities, Safed had a population of 8,761 inhabitants, consisting of 5,431 Muslims, 2,986 Jews, 343 Christians and others.

Safed remained a mixed city during the British Mandate for Palestine and ethnic tensions between Jews and Arabs rose during the 1920s. During the 1929 Palestine riots, Safed and Hebron became major clash points. In what was described in a contemporaneous account as the "systematic slaughter of the Jews" during the Safed massacre, 22 Jewish residents were killed in a "pogrom" by local Arabs who looted and set fire to houses in the city's Jewish quarter.

Safed was included in the part of Palestine recommended to be included in the proposed Jewish state under the United Nations Partition Plan for Palestine.

=== 1948 war ===
In 1948 the city was home to about 12,000 Arabs and about 1,700 Jews, mostly religious and elderly. On 5 January 1948, Arabs attacked the Jewish Quarter. In February 1948, during the civil war, Muslim Arabs attacked a Jewish bus attempting to reach Safed, and the Jewish quarter of the town came under siege by the Muslims. British forces that were present did not intervene. According to Martin Gilbert, food supplies ran short. "Even water and flour were in desperately short supply. Each day, the Arab attackers drew closer to the heart of the Jewish quarter, systematically blowing up Jewish houses as they pressed in on the central area."

On 16 April, the same day that British forces evacuated Safed, 200 local Arab militiamen, supported by over 200 Arab Liberation Army soldiers, tried to take over the city's Jewish Quarter. They were repelled by the Jewish garrison, consisting of some 200 Haganah fighters, men and women, boosted by a Palmach platoon.

The Palmach ground attack on the Arab section of Safed took place on 6 May, as a part of Operation Yiftach. The first phase of the Palmach plan to capture Safed, was to secure a corridor through the mountains by capturing the Arab village of Biriyya. The Arab Liberation Army placed artillery pieces on a hill adjacent to the Jewish quarter and started its shelling. The Palmach's Third Battalion failed to take the main objective, the "citadel", but "terrified" the Arab population sufficiently to prompt further flight, as well as urgent appeals for outside help and an effort to obtain a truce.

The secretary-general of the Arab League Abdul Rahman Hassan Azzam stated that the goal of Plan Dalet was to drive out the inhabitants of Arab villages along the Syrian and Lebanese frontiers, particularly places on the roads by which Arab regular forces could enter the country. He noted that Acre and Safed were in particular danger. However, the appeals for help were ignored, and the British, now less than a week away from the end of the British Mandate of Palestine, also did not intervene against the second and final Haganah attack, which began on the evening of 9 May, with a mortar barrage on key sites in Safed. Following the barrage, Palmach infantry, in bitter fighting, took the citadel, Beit Shalva and the police fort, Safed's three dominant buildings. Through 10 May, Haganah mortars continued to pound the Arab neighbourhoods, causing fires in the marked area and in the fuel dumps, which exploded. "The Palmah 'intentionally left open the exit routes for the population to "facilitate" their exodus...' " According to Gilbert, "The Arabs of Safed began to leave, including the commander of the Arab forces, Adib Shishakli (later Prime Minister of Syria). With the police fort on Mount Canaan isolated, its defenders withdrew without fighting. The fall of Safed was a blow to Arab morale throughout the region... With the invasion of Palestine by regular Arab armies believed to be imminent – once the British had finally left in eleven or twelve days' time – many Arabs felt that prudence dictated their departure until the Jews had been defeated and they could return to their homes. According to Abbasi, the exodus of the Arabs of Safed had three phases. The first was due to the departure of the British compounded by the failure of an attack on the Jewish quarter and a disagreement between the Jordanian and Syrian commanders. The second was due to the fall of nearby Ein al-Zeitun and the massacre that Jewish forces committed there. The third was due to the deliberate creation of panic by Jewish forces.

Some 12,000 Arabs, with some estimates reaching 15,000, fled Safed and were a "heavy burden on the Arab war effort". Among them was the family of Palestinian Authority President Mahmoud Abbas. (Note: Abbas is quoted as saying "People were motivated to run away... They feared retribution from Zionist terrorist organizations – particularly from the Safed ones. Those of us from Safed especially feared that the Jews harbored old desires to avenge what happened during the 1929 uprising.... They realized the balance of forces was shifting and therefore the whole town was abandoned on the basis of this rationale – saving our lives and our belongings." In 2012 Abbas stated "I visited Safed before once. I want to see Safed. It's my right to see it, but not to live there.") The city was fully under the control of Jewish paramilitary forces by 11 May 1948.

Early in June, Jewish dignitaries from Safed journeyed to Tel Aviv to ask the government to block the return of Arabs to the city, threatening to abandon it if the latter were allowed back. They reasoned that since most of the Arabs' property had been seized or stolen in the meantime, the Jewish community would be unable to withstand the pressure of the returnees' demands for restitution.

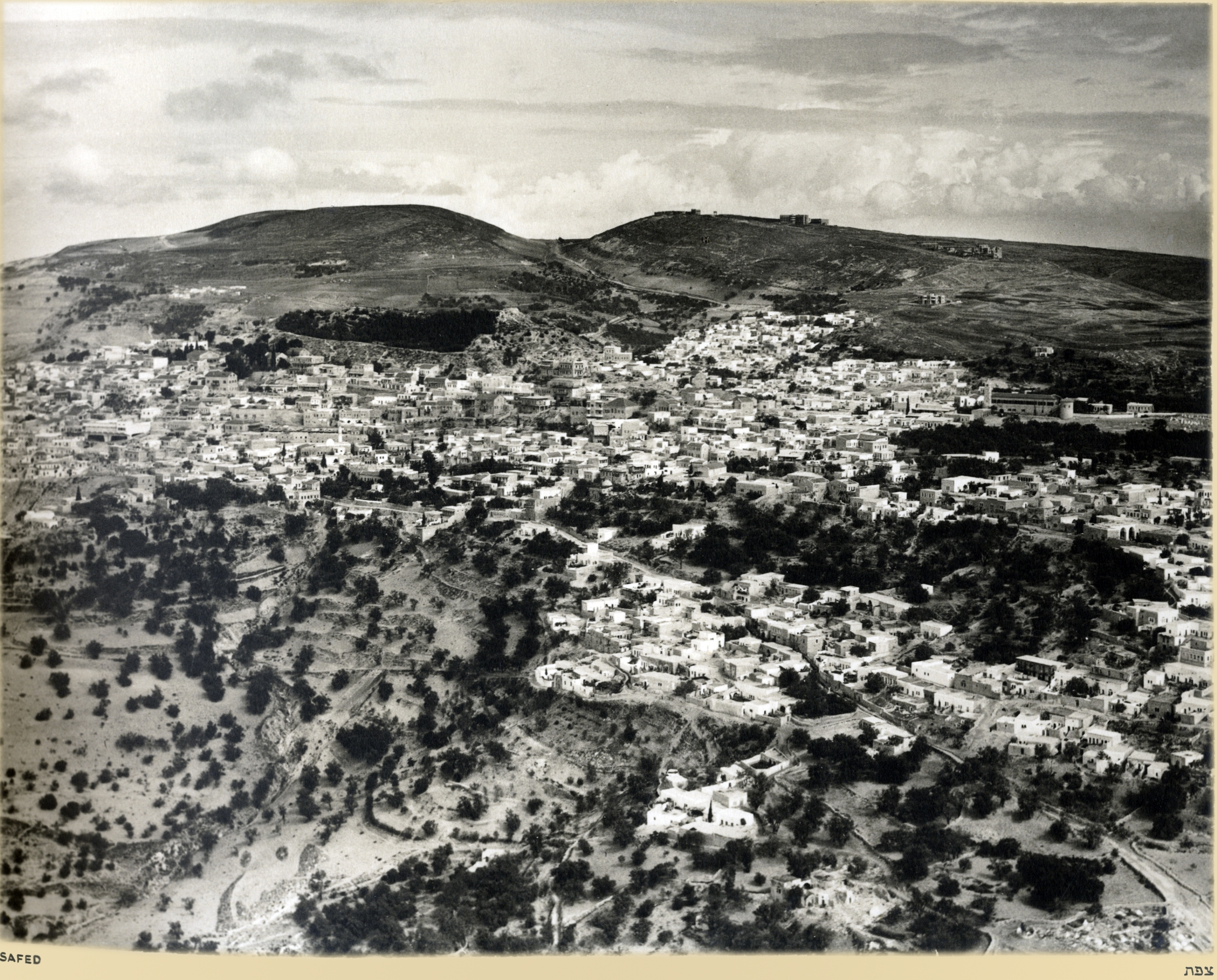
Safad 1937

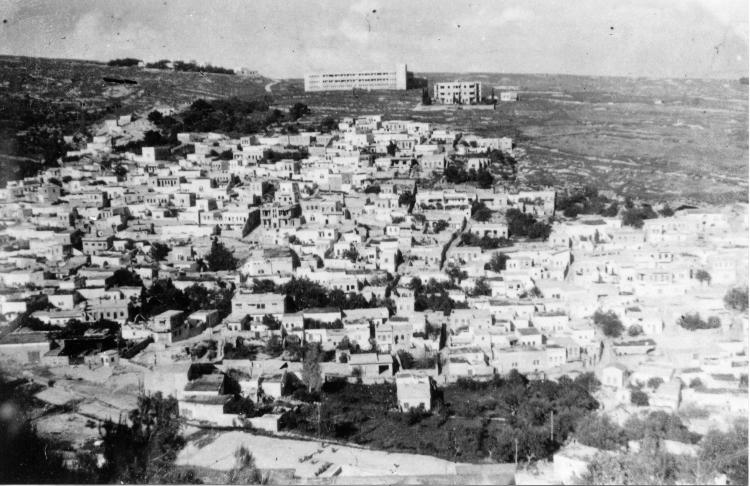
Mandate Police station at Mount Canaan, above Safed (1948)

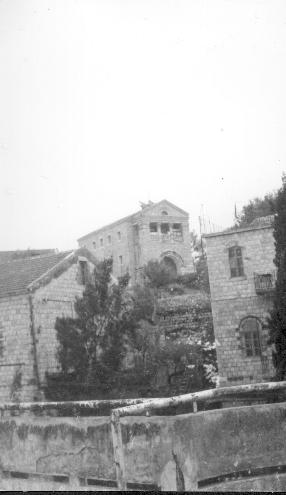
Safed (1948)

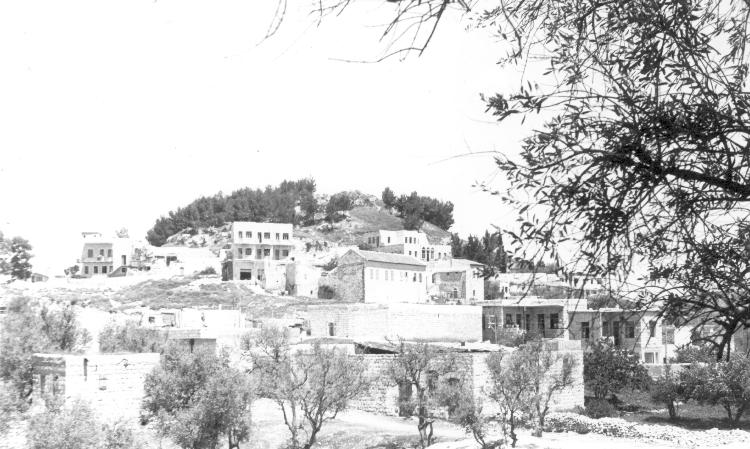
Safed Citadel (1948)

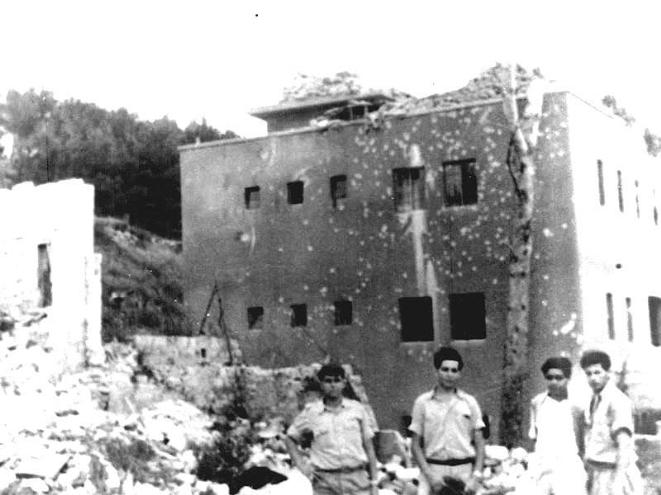
Safad Municipal Police Station after the battle (1948)

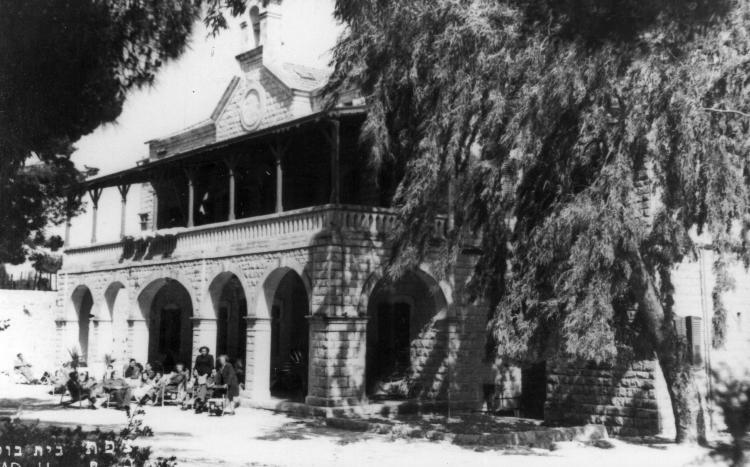
Bussel House, Safad, 11 April 1948: Yiftach Brigade headquarters

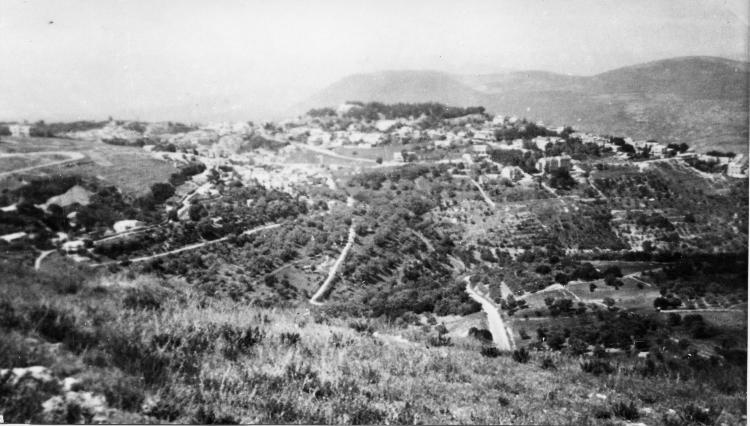
View of Safed from Mount Canaan (1948)

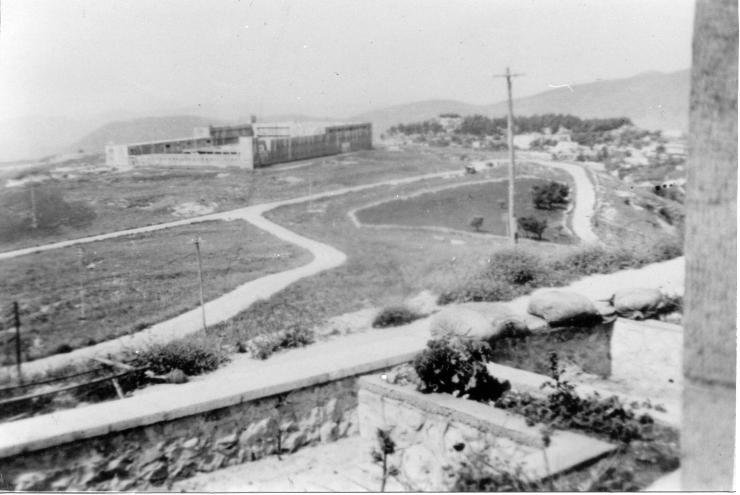
Mandate administration building on the eastern outskirts of Safed (1948)

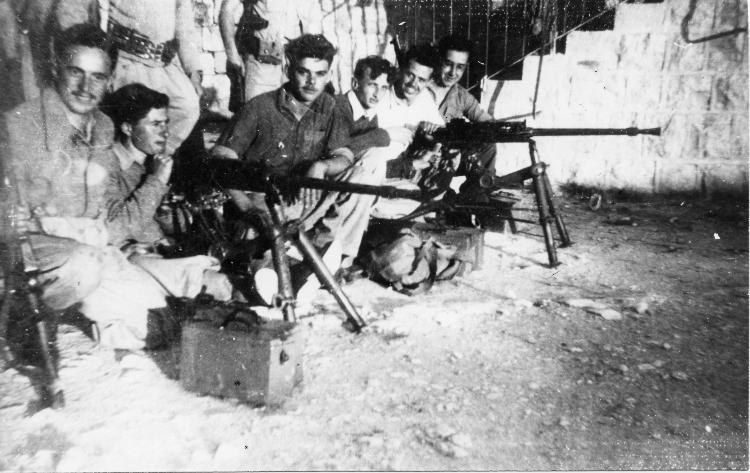
Yiftach Brigade, with their Hotchkiss machine guns, based at Bussel House, 1948

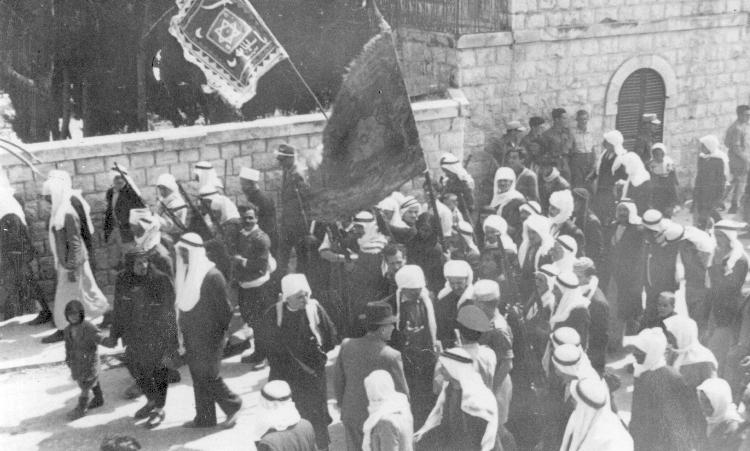
Druze parading in Safed after the Palmach victory in 1948

=== State of Israel ===
In 1974, 25 Israeli Jews (mainly school children) from Safed, were killed in the Ma'alot massacre. Over 1990s and early 2000s, the town accepted thousands of Russian Jewish immigrants and Ethiopian Beta Israel. In July 2006, "Katyusha" rockets fired by Hezbollah from Southern Lebanon hit Safed, killing one man and injuring others. Many residents fled the town for the duration of the conflict. On 22 July, four people were injured in a rocket attack.

The town has retained its unique status as a Jewish studies centre, incorporating numerous facilities. In 2010, eighteen senior rabbis led by the chief rabbi of Safed, Shmuel Eliyahu, issued an edict urging the city's residents not to rent or sell property to Arabs, warning of an "Arab takeover"; Arabs constituted a small fraction of the population, and the statement was generally perceived to be directed at the 1,300 Arab students enrolled at Zefat Academic College.

== Mayors ==
- Muhammad Effendi Hassan Abd al-Rahman (elected in 1927)
- Ali Reza al-Nakhawi (1931–1934)
- Salah Izz al-Din Qaddura (elected in 1934)
- Zaki Qaddura (1934-1946)
- Moshe Padhatzur (1948–1955)
- Avraham HaCohen (1955–1965)
- Meir Meivar (March–November 1965; November 1969–September 1971)
- Yaakov Hopert (November 1966–April 1966; April 1967–November 1969)
- Israel Chaim Berkowitz (April 1966–April 1967)
- Eli Kadoush (1971–1973)
- Aharon Nahmias (1973–1983)
- Ze'ev Perl (1983–1993)
- Moshe Chaniya (1993–1998)
- Yosef Oz (1998–2001)
- Oded HaMairi (2001–2003)
- Yishai Maimon (2003–2008)
- Ilan Shohat (2008–2018)
- Shuki Ohana (2018–February 2024)
- Yossi Kakun (2024–)

== Demographics ==
Historical population
Year	Pop.	±%
1972	13,700	—
1983	15,900	+16.1%
1995	21,900	+37.7%
2008	29,600	+35.2%
2022	37,801	+27.7%
2024	38,687	+2.3%

In 2008, the population of Safed was 32,000. According to CBS figures in 2001, the ethnic makeup of the city was 99.2% Jewish and non-Arab, with no significant Arab population. 43.2% of the residents were 19 years of age or younger, 13.5% between 20 and 29, 17.1% between 30 and 44, 12.5% from 45 to 59, 3.1% from 60 to 64, and 10.5% 65 years of age or older.

The city is home to a relatively large community of Haredi Jews. The village of Akbara in the city's southwestern outskirts, which had a population of about 500 Arab Muslims, most of whom belonged to a single clan, the Halihal, is under Safed's municipal jurisdiction.

== Seismology ==
The city is located above the Dead Sea Transform, and is one of the cities in Israel most at risk of earthquakes (along with Tiberias, Beit She'an, Kiryat Shmona, and Eilat).

== Geography ==
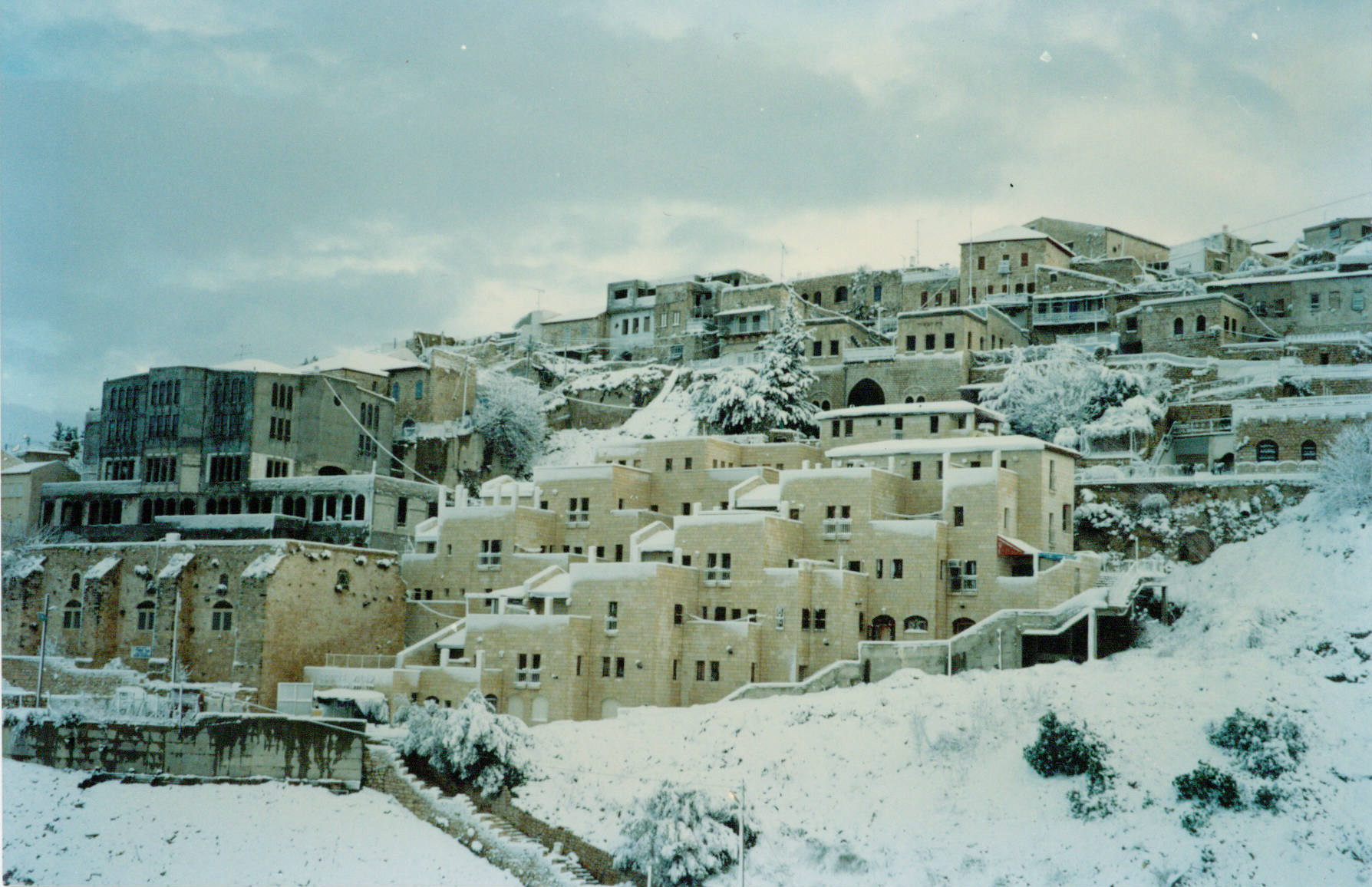
Safed in winter

Safed is 40 kilometers (25 mi) east of Acre and 20 kilometers (12 mi) north of Tiberias.

=== Climate ===
Despite its high altitude, Safed has a hot-summer Mediterranean climate (Köppen climate classification: Csa) with hot, dry summers and cool, rainy and occasionally snowy winters. The city receives 682 mm (27 in) of precipitation per year. Summers are rainless and hot with an average high temperature of 31 °C (88 °F) and an average low temperature of 20 °C (68 °F). Winters are cool and wet, and precipitation is occasionally in the form of snow. Winters have an average high temperature of 10 °C (50 °F) and an average low temperature of 5 °C (41 °F). Night frost is common in winter.

Climate data for Safed (Har Kenaan) (2004-2022, extremes 1939–present)
Month	Jan	Feb	Mar	Apr	May	Jun	Jul	Aug	Sep	Oct	Nov	Dec	Year
Record high °C (°F)	21.7 (71.1)	26.7 (80.1)	30.9 (87.6)	34.5 (94.1)	38.1 (100.6)	40.0 (104.0)	39.0 (102.2)	42.0 (107.6)	40.6 (105.1)	36.0 (96.8)	30.1 (86.2)	24.4 (75.9)	42.0 (107.6)
Mean daily maximum °C (°F)	10.3 (50.5)	12.2 (54.0)	15.6 (60.1)	20.5 (68.9)	25.3 (77.5)	28.6 (83.5)	30.6 (87.1)	30.4 (86.7)	28.5 (83.3)	24.8 (76.6)	18.1 (64.6)	12.6 (54.7)	21.4 (70.5)
Daily mean °C (°F)	7.6 (45.7)	9.1 (48.4)	11.7 (53.1)	15.9 (60.6)	20.1 (68.2)	23.1 (73.6)	25.2 (77.4)	25.2 (77.4)	23.4 (74.1)	20.4 (68.7)	14.8 (58.6)	10.0 (50.0)	17.2 (63.0)
Mean daily minimum °C (°F)	5.0 (41.0)	6.0 (42.8)	7.9 (46.2)	11.3 (52.3)	14.9 (58.8)	17.6 (63.7)	19.9 (67.8)	20.0 (68.0)	18.4 (65.1)	15.9 (60.6)	11.4 (52.5)	7.3 (45.1)	13.0 (55.3)
Record low °C (°F)	−6.4 (20.5)	−9.0 (15.8)	−3.4 (25.9)	0.2 (32.4)	5.7 (42.3)	8.7 (47.7)	12.2 (54.0)	13.0 (55.4)	10.7 (51.3)	5.9 (42.6)	−1.7 (28.9)	−3.2 (26.2)	−9.0 (15.8)
Average rainfall mm (inches)	182.1 (7.17)	122.9 (4.84)	61.4 (2.42)	34.8 (1.37)	12.3 (0.48)	0.1 (0.00)	0.0 (0.0)	0.8 (0.03)	3.3 (0.13)	21.3 (0.84)	72.3 (2.85)	143.4 (5.65)	654.7 (25.78)
Average rainy days (≥ 0.1 mm)	14.3	11.3	9.7	5.0	2.9	0.2	0.0	0.1	1.1	4.3	7.8	11.3	67.9
Source: Israel Meteorological Service

== Education ==
According to CBS, the city has 25 schools and 6,292 students. There are 18 elementary schools with a student population of 3,965, and 11 high schools with a student population of 2,327. 40.8% of Safed's 12th graders were eligible for a matriculation (bagrut) certificate in 2001. The Zefat Academic College, originally an extension of Bar-Ilan University, was granted independent accreditation by Israel's Council of Higher Education in 2007. For the 2011–2012 school year, the college began a program designed specifically for Haredi Judaism. It was created in order to allow haredi women living in the Upper Galilee access to higher education, while still maintaining strict religious practice. The program accomplishes this goal through separate classes for male and female students. The classes are also taught during certain hours as to allow women to fulfill other aspects of their religiosity.

In October 2011, Israel's fifth medical school, a branch of Bar Ilan University, opened in Safed housed in a renovated historic building in the centre of town that was once a branch of Hadassah Hospital. The Azrieli Faculty of Medicine opened in 2011 as an extension of Bar-Ilan University, created to train physicians in the Upper Galilee region. The schools conducts clinical instructions in six hospitals in the region:

- Tzafon Medical Center
- Ziv Medical Center
- Western Galilee Hospital
- EMMS Nazareth Hospital
- The Holy Family Hospital
- Mazra Mental Health Center

On 8 March 2021, the Israeli Prime-Minister Benjamin Netanyahu announced that Israel is to establish its 10th university in Safed, after a growing need for a university in the northern district of Israel. Plans have been in place to establish a university in the Galilee since 2005, but no progress was made until 2015 when Netanyahu vowed to start working on the project during a Galilee Conference.

As one of Judaism's Holy Cities, Safed hosts several Yeshivas. The Haredi Yeshivat Tzfat and associated institutions are headed by Rabbi Mordechai Kaplan. The Religious Zionist Hesder Yeshiva of Tzfat was founded in 1997 by Rabbi Benyahu Broner and is today headed by Rabbi Shemuel Eliyahu with approximately 120 students. For women, Sharei Bina is a midrasha (seminary) offering a one-year post high school program, with an increased focus on Jewish spirituality - including formal study of Kabbalistic topics. Chabad has several institutions including Machon Alte for women, and the advanced Kollel Tzemach Tzedek.

The Livnot U'Lehibanot program in Safed provides an open, non-denominational atmosphere for young Jewish adults that combines volunteering, hiking and study with exploring Jewish heritage.

== Culture ==
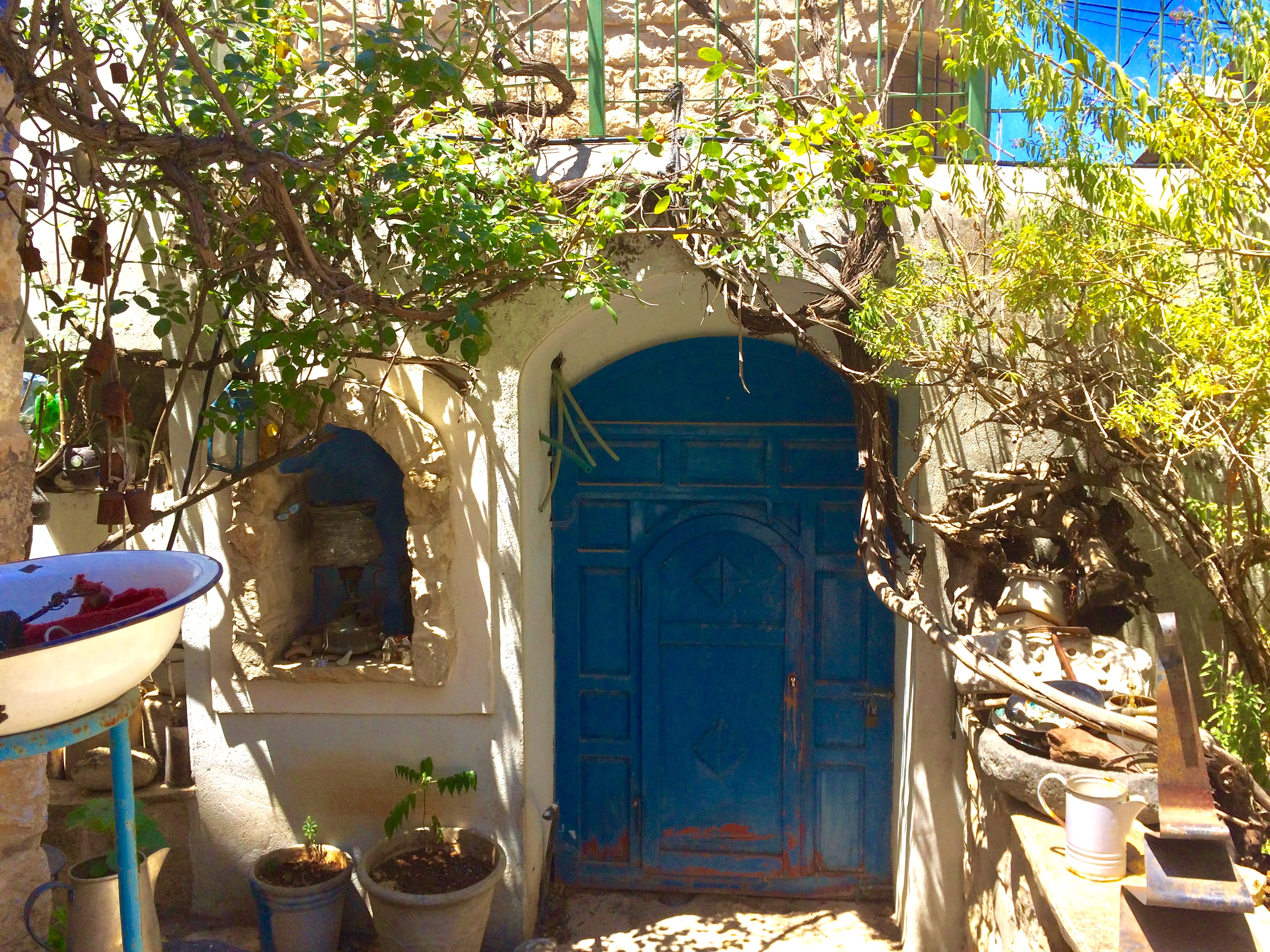
Beit Castel gallery in the artists' colony

=== Artists' colony ===
In the 1950s and 1960s, Safed was known as Israel's art capital. An artists' colony established in the old Arab quarter was a hub of creativity that drew artists from around the country, among them Yitzhak Frenkel, Yosl Bergner, Moshe Castel, Menachem Shemi, Shimshon Holzman and Rolly Schaffer.

In honor of the opening of the Glitzenstein Art Museum in 1953, the artist Mane Katz donated eight of his paintings to the city. Today the area contains a large number of galleries and workshops run by individual artists and art vendors. There are several museums and galleries that function in the historical homes of major Israeli artists such as the Frenkel Frenel Museum and the Beit Castel gallery (in Moshe Castel's former home).

=== Music ===
In the 1960s, Safed was home to the country's top nightclubs, hosting the debut performances of Naomi Shemer, Aris San, and other singers. Nowadays, Safed has been hailed as the klezmer capital of the world, hosting an annual Klezmer Festival that attracts top musicians from around the globe. A school of world music, especially eastern music called Maqamat operates in the Artists' Quarter of Safed.

=== Museums ===
- The Beit Hameiri museum documents Safed's Jewish community over the past 200 years.
- The Museum of the Art of Printing displays the first Hebrew printing press.

== Historic sites ==
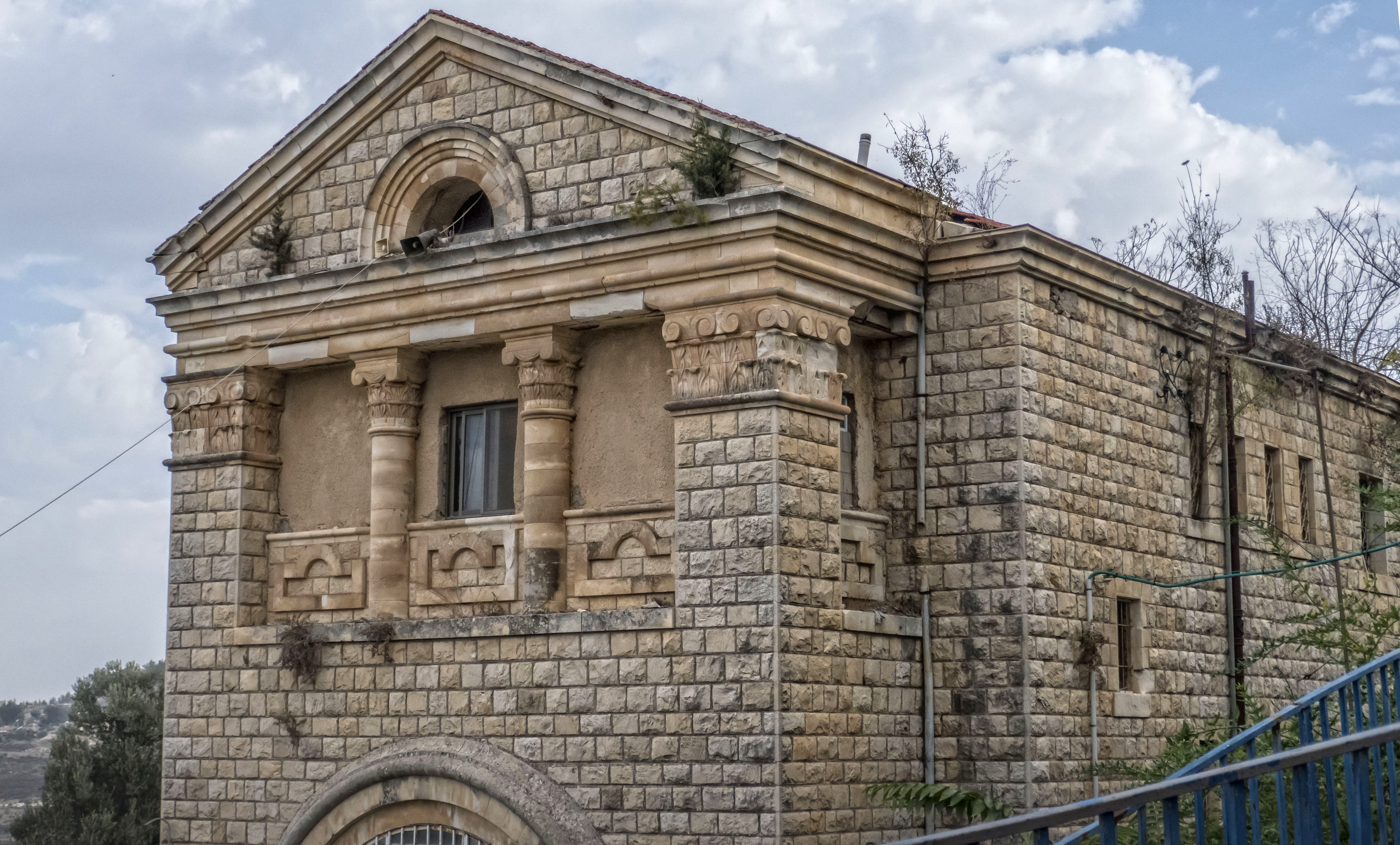
Scottish church in Safed

Citadel Hill

The Citadel Hill, in Hebrew HaMetzuda, rises east of the Old City and is named after the huge Crusader and then Mamluk castle built there during the 12th and 13th centuries, which continued in use until being totally destroyed by the 1837 earthquake. Its ruins are still visible. On the western slope beneath the ruins stands the former British police station, still pockmarked by bullet holes from the 1948 war.

Old Jewish Quarter

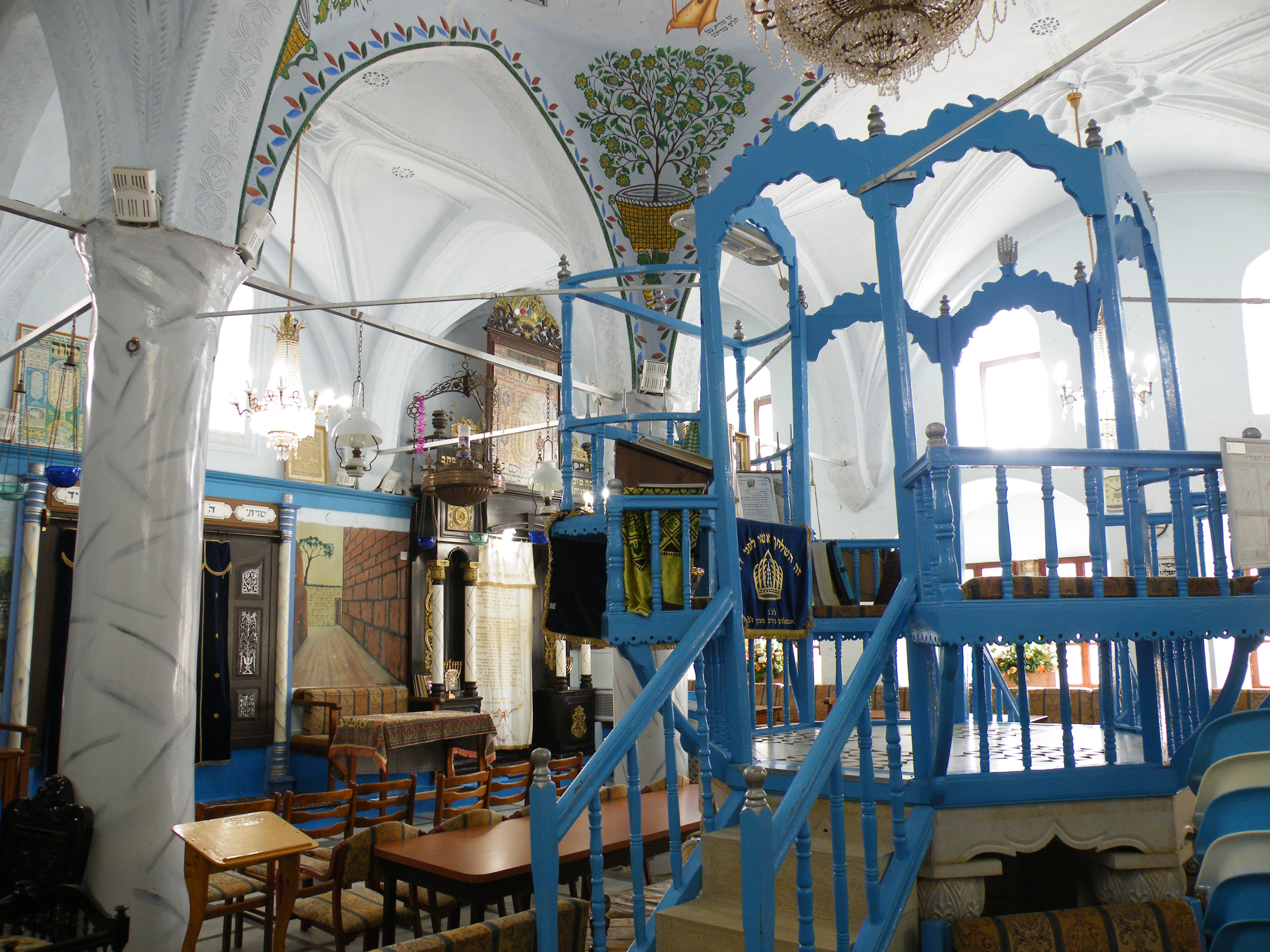
Abuhav Synagogue, one of the city's historic synagogues

Before 1948, most of Safed's Jewish population used to live in the northern section of the old city. Currently home to 32 synagogues, it is also referred to as the synagogue quarter and includes synagogues named after prominent rabbis of the town: the Abuhav, Alsheich, Karo and two named for Rabbi Isaac Luria: one Ashkenazi, the other Sephardi.

Mamluk-period buildings

Further south are two monumental Mamluk-period buildings:

- the Red Mosque with a khan (1276)
- the Mamluk mausoleum, now used by freemasons. The mausoleum was built for a Mamluk na'ib (governor) of Safed, Muzaffar ad-Din Musa ibn Hajj al-Ruqtay Musa Muzaffar al-Din ibn Ruqtay al-Hajj, who died in AH 762/AD 1360–61).

Southeast of the Artists' Quarter is the Saraya, the fortified governor's residence built by Daher al-Umar (1689/90–1775).

A report about the "obliteration of non-Jewish historic sites in Safed" mentions a mausoleum, an ancient grave and an ancient mosque that was converted into a clubhouse.

== Voting patterns ==
In the 2022 election, 86 percent of voters in Safed voted for the parties of the right-wing coalition led by Benjamin Netanyahu, while 11 percent voted for the parties of the center-left coalition led by Yair Lapid and 1 percent voted for the Arab parties.

In the 2026 election, 84 percent of voters in Safed voted for the parties of the right-wing coalition led by Benjamin Netanyahu, while 11 percent voted for the parties of the center-left coalition led by Gadi Eisenkot and 2 percent voted for the Arab parties. An additional 1.1 percent voted for the Reservists, and 1.2 percent voted for Amcha Yisrael. Voter turnout increased 11 percent from the 2022 election.

== Twin towns – sister cities ==
Safed is twinned with:

- Erzsébetváros, Budapest, Hungary
- Guarda, Portugal
- Lille, France
- Nikopol, Bulgaria
- Palm Beach County, Florida, United States
- Toledo, Castile–La Mancha, Spain

== Gallery ==
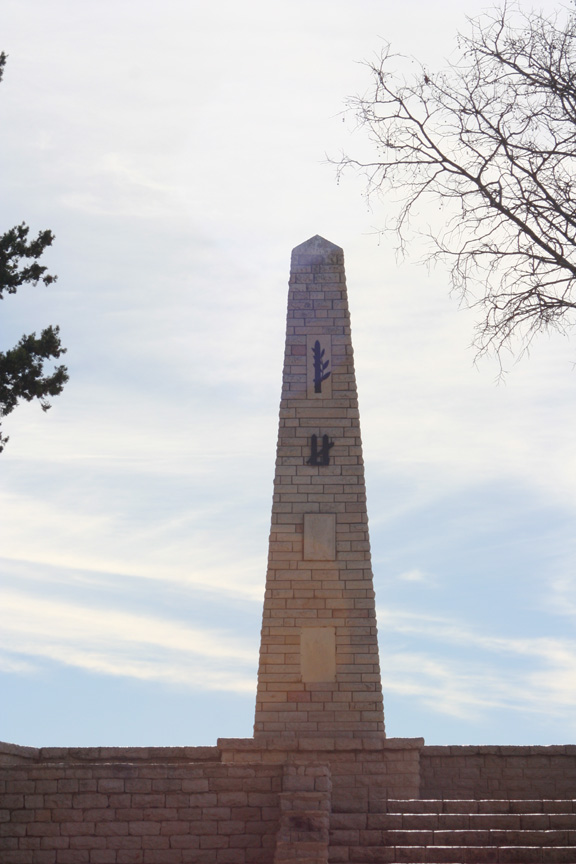
Monument to the Israeli soldiers who fought in the 1948 Arab–Israeli War

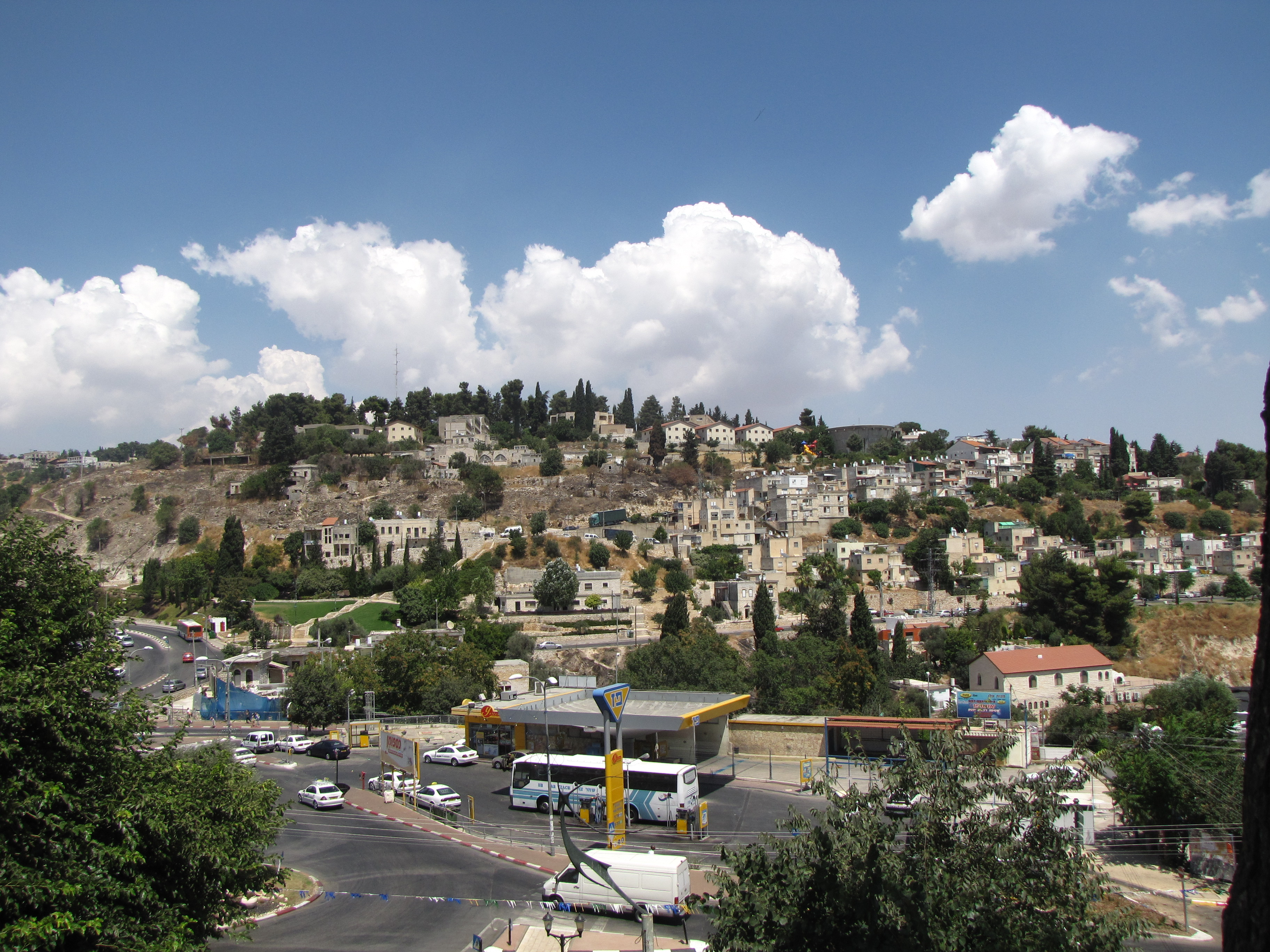
Safed in 2009

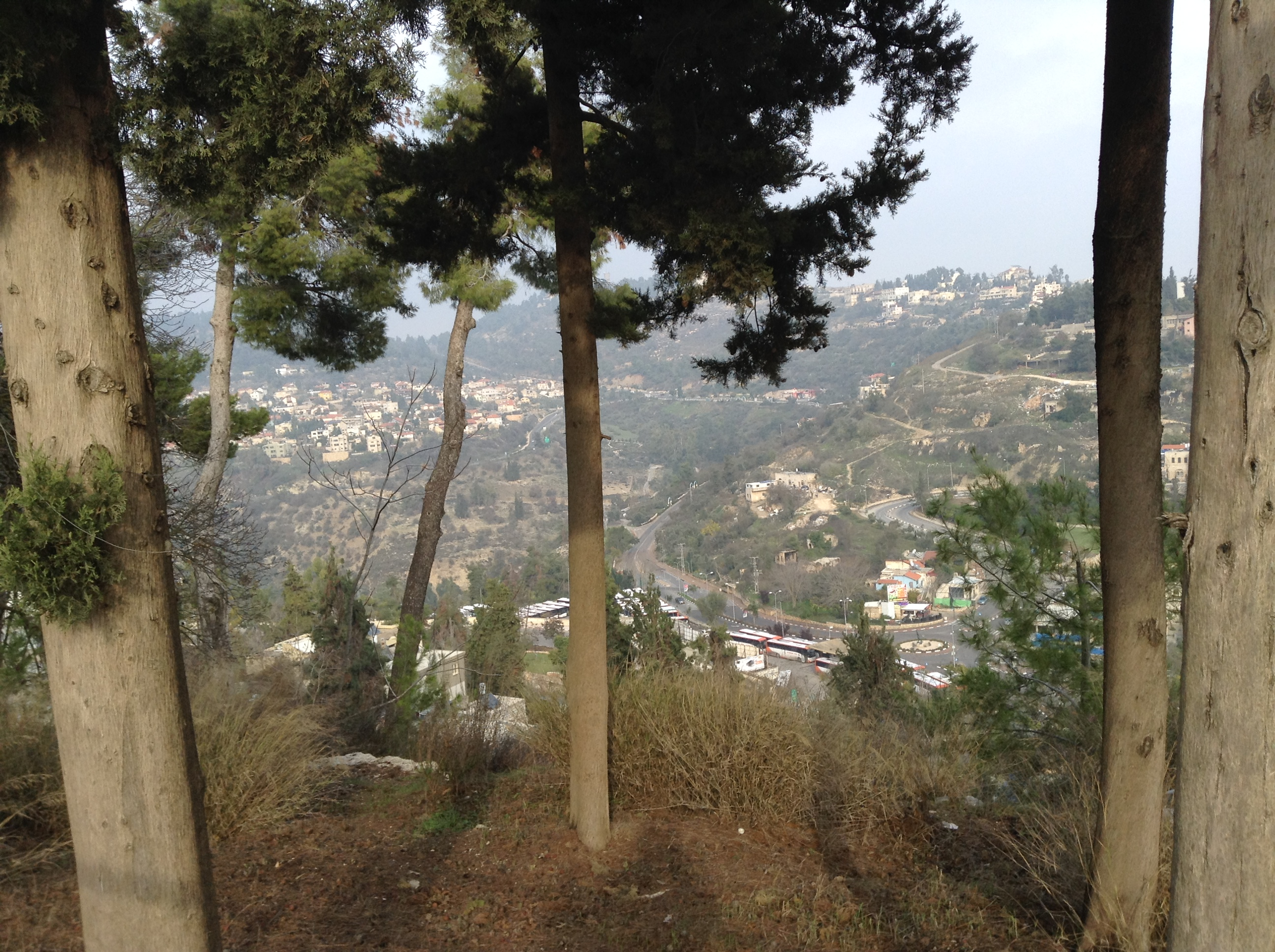
View of Safed

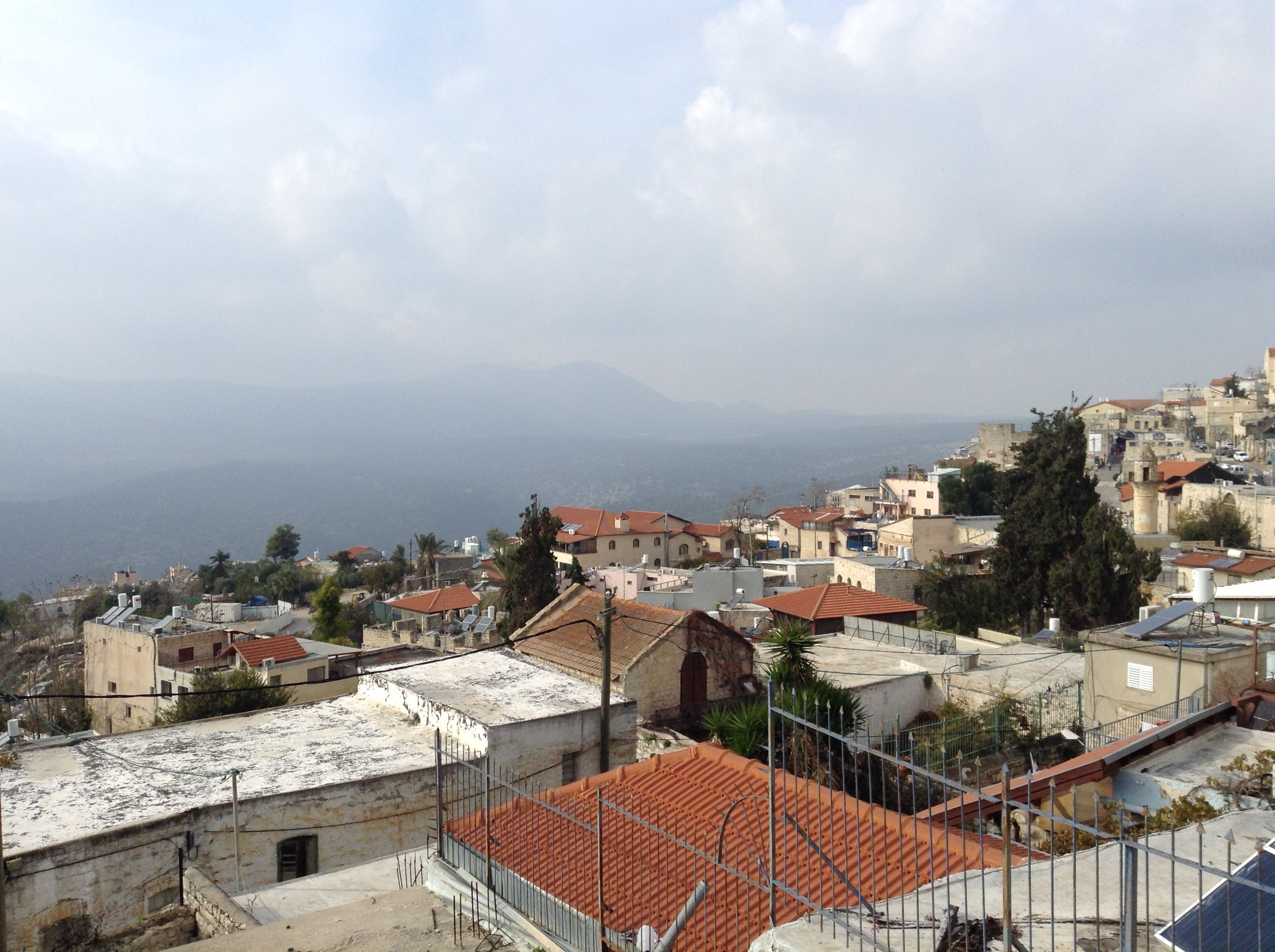
View of Safed

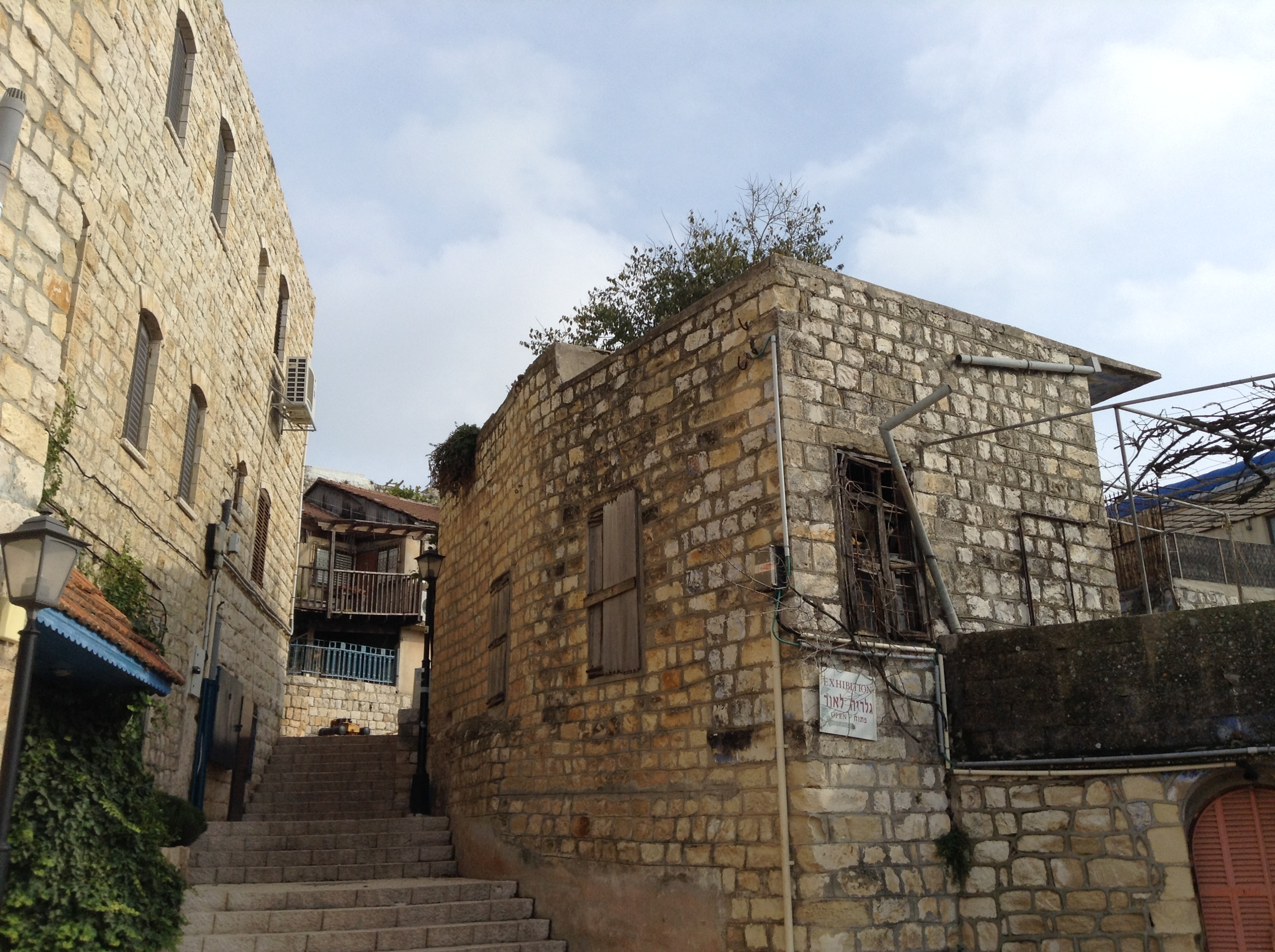
Houses in Safed

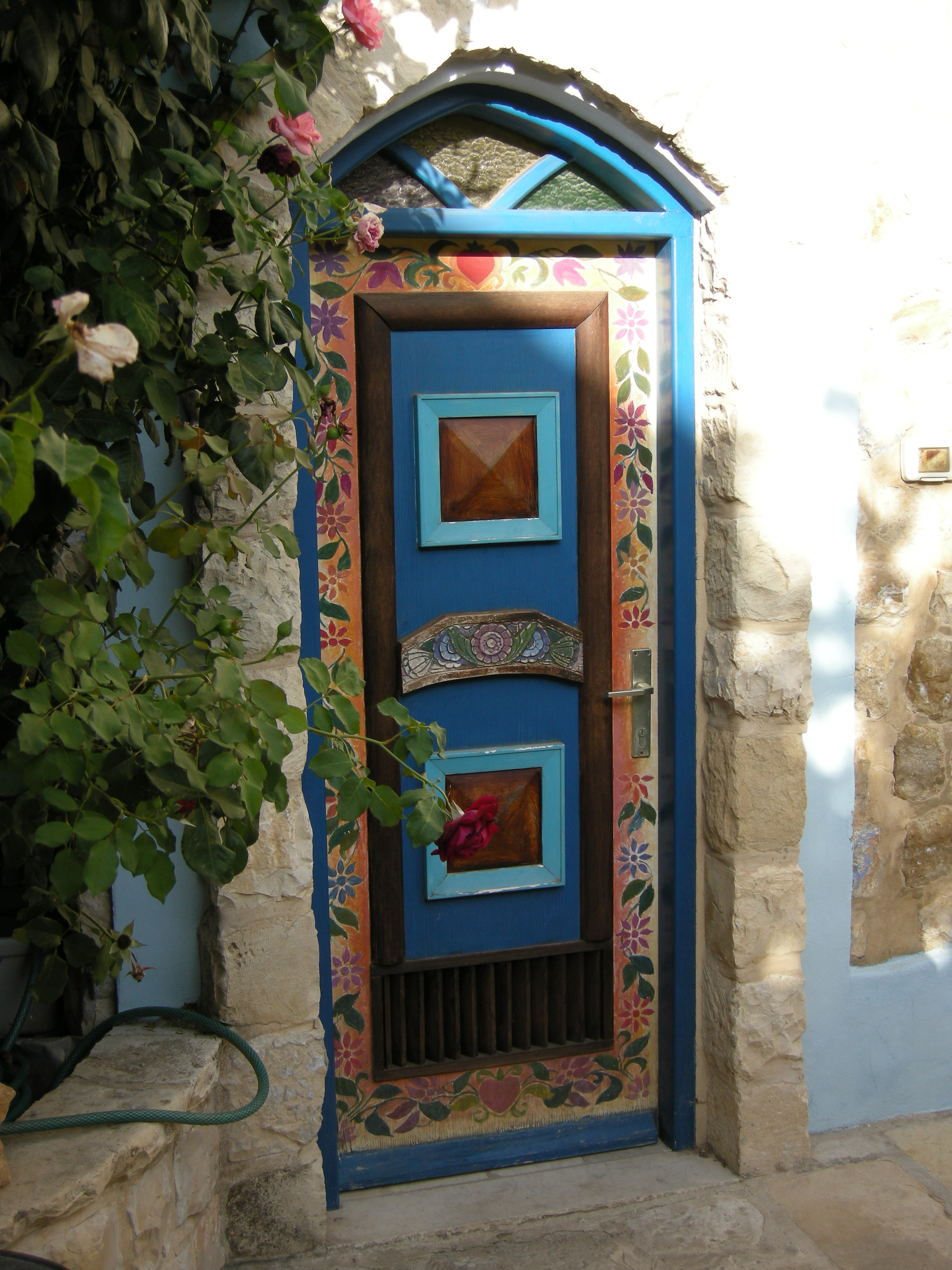
Doorway in Beit Castel gallery, Safed

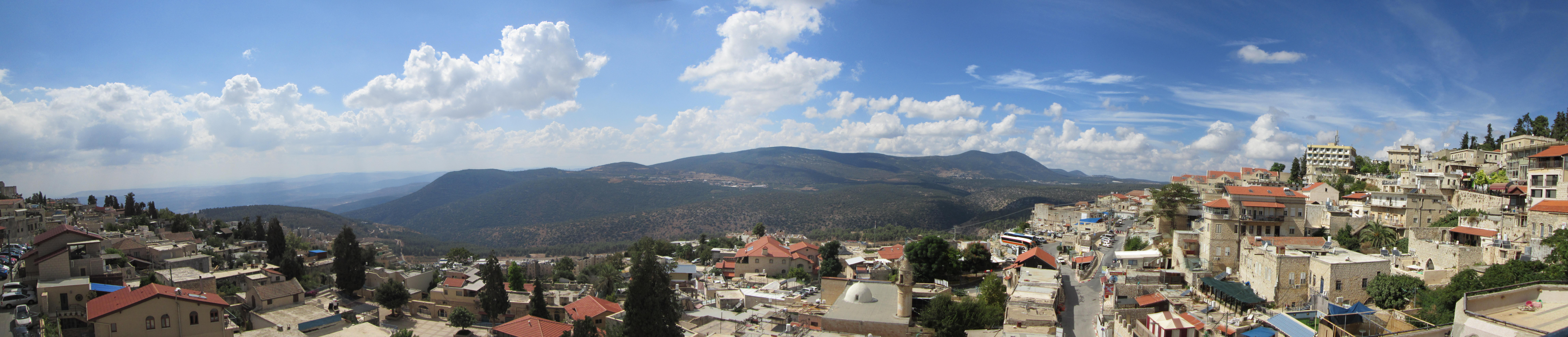
Panorama Safed and Mount Meron

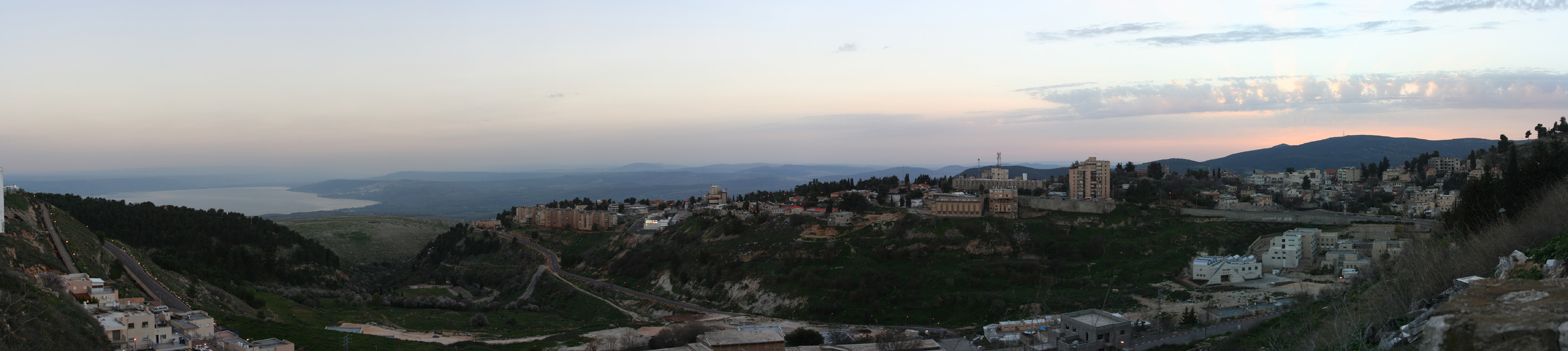
View to the east and Sea of Galilee

== See also ==
- List of clock towers – Safed has its own, the Ottoman clock tower of the "Saraya" (government house), inaugurated in 1900

== Bibliography ==
- Abbasi, Mustafa (February 2003). "The Arab Community of Safad 1840–1918: A Critical Period". Jerusalem Quarterly. 17 (17): 49–58. doi:10.70190/jq.I17.p49.
- Abbasi, Mustafa (February 2004). "The Battle for Safad in the War of 1948: A Revised Study". International Journal of Middle East Studies. 36 (1): 21–47. doi:10.1017/S0020743804361027. JSTOR 3880136.
- Abu Mannah, Butrus; Weismann, Itzchak; Zachs, Fruma, eds. (2005). Ottoman Reform and Muslim Regeneration. I.B. Tauris. ISBN 1-85043-757-2.
- Amitai-Preiss, R. (1995). "Ṣafad". In Bosworth, C. E.; van Donzel, E.; Heinrichs, W. P. & Lecomte, G. (eds.). The Encyclopaedia of Islam, Second Edition. Volume VIII: Ned–Sam. Leiden: E. J. Brill. pp. 757–759. ISBN 978-90-04-09834-3.
- Barbé, Hervé (2016). "Safed Castle and its Territory: Frankish Settlement and Colonisation in Eastern Upper Galilee during the Crusader Period". In Sinibaldi, Micaela; Lewis, Kevin J.; Balázs, Major; Thompson, Jennifer A. (eds.). Crusader Landscapes in the Medieval Levant: The Archaeology and History of the Latin East. Cardiff: University of Wales Press. pp. 55–80. ISBN 978-1-78316-924-5.
- Barron, J.B., ed. (1923). Palestine: Report and General Abstracts of the Census of 1922. Government of Palestine.
- Cohen, Amnon (1973). Palestine in the 18th Century: Patterns of Government and Administration. Jerusalem: The Magnes Press. ISBN 978-0-19-647903-3.
- Deeb, Mary-Jane (1996). "A Biographical Note". In Deeb, Mary-Jane; King, Mary E. (eds.). Hasib Sabbagh: From Palestinian Refugee to Citizen of the World. Lanham, Maryland and London: Middle East Institute and University Press of America. ISBN 0-916808-43-2.
- Drory, Joseph (2004). "Founding a New Mamlaka". In Winter, Michael; Levanoni, Amalia (eds.). The Mamluks in Egyptian and Syrian Politics and Society. Brill. ISBN 9789004132863.
- Ebied, R. Y.; Young, M. J. L. (1975). Some Arabic Legal Documents of the Ottoman Period: From the Leeds Manuscript Collection University of Leeds, Dept. of Semitic Studies. Brill Archive. ISBN 90-04-04401-9.
- Ellenblum, R. (2007). Crusader Castles and Modern Histories. Cambridge: Cambridge University Press. ISBN 9781139462556.
- Franco, M. (1916). "Safed". The Jewish Encyclopedia: A Descriptive Record of the History, Religion, Literature, and Customs of the Jewish People from the Earliest Times to the Present Day. Vol. 10. New York and London: Funk and Wagnalls Company. pp. 633–636.
- Government of Palestine, Department of Statistics (1945). Village Statistics, April, 1945.
- Hadawi, S. (1970). Village Statistics of 1945: A Classification of Land and Area ownership in Palestine. Palestine Liberation Organization Research Center.
- Holt, P. M. (1995). Early Mamluk Diplomacy, 1260–1290: Treaties of Baybars and Qalāwūn with Christian Rulers. Leiden and New York: Brill. ISBN 90-04-10246-9.
- Layish, Aharon (1987). ""Waqfs" and Ṣūfī Monasteries in the Ottoman Policy of Colonization: Sulṭan Selīm I's "waqf" of 1516 in Favour of Dayr al-Asad". Bulletin of the School of Oriental and African Studies, University of London. 50 (1): 61–89. doi:10.1017/S0041977X00053192. JSTOR 616894. S2CID 161757141.
- Le Strange, G. (1890). Palestine Under the Moslems: A Description of Syria and the Holy Land from A.D. 650 to 1500. Committee of the Palestine Exploration Fund.
- Lieber, Sherman (1992). Mystics and missionaries: the Jews in Palestine, 1799–1840. University of Utah Press. p. 256. ISBN 978-0-87480-391-4.
- Luz, Nimrod (2014). The Mamluk City in the Middle East: History, Culture, and the Urban Landscape. Cambridge: Cambridge University Press. ISBN 978-1-107-04884-3.
- Mills, E., ed. (1932). Census of Palestine 1931. Population of Villages, Towns and Administrative Areas. Jerusalem: Government of Palestine.
- Morgenstern, Arie (2006). Hastening Redemption: Messianism and the Resettlement of the Land of Israel. Translated by Joel A. Linsider. New York: Oxford University Press. ISBN 978-0-19-530578-4.
- Morris, B. (2004). The Birth of the Palestinian Refugee Problem Revisited. Cambridge University Press. ISBN 0-521-00967-7.
- Petersen, Andrew (2001). A Gazetteer of Buildings in Muslim Palestine, Part 1. London: Council for British Research in the Levant. ISBN 978-0-19-727011-0.
- Pringle, D. (1985). "Review Article: Reconstructing the Castle of Safad". Palestine Exploration Quarterly. 117 (2): 139–149. doi:10.1179/peq.1985.117.2.139.
- Rhode, H. (1979). The Administration and Population of the Sancak of Safad in the Sixteenth Century (PhD). Columbia University.
- Salibi, K. (1988). A House of Many Mansions: The History of Lebanon Reconsidered. University of California Press. ISBN 978-0-520-07196-4.
- Schumacher, G. (1888). "Population list of the Liwa of Akka". Quarterly Statement - Palestine Exploration Fund. 20: 169–191.
- Sharon, M. (1997). Corpus Inscriptionum Arabicarum Palaestinae, A. Vol. 1. Brill. ISBN 90-04-10833-5.
- Sharon, M. (2007). Corpus Inscriptionum Arabicarum Palaestinae, Addendum. Brill. ISBN 978-90-04-15780-4.
- Sicker, Martin (1999). Reshaping Palestine: From Muhammad Ali to the British Mandate, 1831-1922. Westport and London: Praeger. ISBN 0-275-96639-9.
