= Lebanon (disambiguation) =

Lebanon is a country in West Asia, bordering the Mediterranean Sea.

Lebanon may also refer to:

== Places ==
=== Lebanon ===
- Mount Lebanon
- Greater Lebanon

=== United States ===
- Lebanon, Colorado
- Lebanon, Connecticut
- Lebanon, Delaware
- Lebanon, Georgia
- Lebanon, Illinois
- Lebanon, Indiana
- Lebanon, Kansas
- Georgetown, Kentucky or Lebanon
- Lebanon, Kentucky
  - Lebanon National Cemetery
- Lebanon, Maine
- Lebanon, Missouri
- Lebanon, Nebraska
- Lebanon, New Hampshire
  - Lebanon College
- Lebanon, New Jersey
- Lebanon, New York
- Lebanon (Dunn, North Carolina), a historic plantation house
- Lebanon, North Dakota
- Lebanon, Ohio
  - Lebanon Correctional Institution
  - Lebanon Raceway
- Lebanon, Oklahoma
- Lebanon, Oregon
- Lebanon, Pennsylvania
  - Battle of Lebanon, a battle in the American Civil War
- Lebanon County, Pennsylvania
- Lebanon, South Carolina, a site of a tornado during the Hurricane Frances tornado outbreak
- Lebanon, South Dakota
- Lebanon, Tennessee
- Lebanon, Hardin County, Tennessee
- Lebanon, Texas
- Lebanon, Virginia
- Lebanon, Dodge County, Wisconsin, a town
  - Lebanon (CDP), Wisconsin, a census-designated place
- Lebanon, Waupaca County, Wisconsin, a town

== Other uses ==
- Lebanon (film), a 2009 Israeli film
- Lebanon (grape) or Catawba grape
- Lebanon (painting), a 1983 painting by Nabil Kanso
- Lebanon bologna, a type of lunch meat
- Lebanon cedar
- Lebanon Cemetery
- "The Lebanon" (song), a song by The Human League from Hysteria
- "Lebanon", a song by Scatman John
- The Lebanon pigeon, a breed of domestic pigeon
- "Lebanon", the 300th episode of the American dark fantasy television series Supernatural

== See also ==
- Lebanon Airport (disambiguation)
- Lebanon High School (disambiguation)
- Lebanon Township (disambiguation)
- Lebanon Valley College, a private college in Annville, Pennsylvania
- Levanon (disambiguation)
- Mount Lebanon (disambiguation)
- New Lebanon (disambiguation)
- Old Lebanon, Wisconsin, an unincorporated community
- South Lebanon (disambiguation)
- West Lebanon (disambiguation)
- Líbano (disambiguation)
