= International Klezmer Festival in Safed =

Annual music festival in Safed, Israel

International Klezmer Festival in Safed פסטיבל הכליזמרים הבין לאומי בצפת
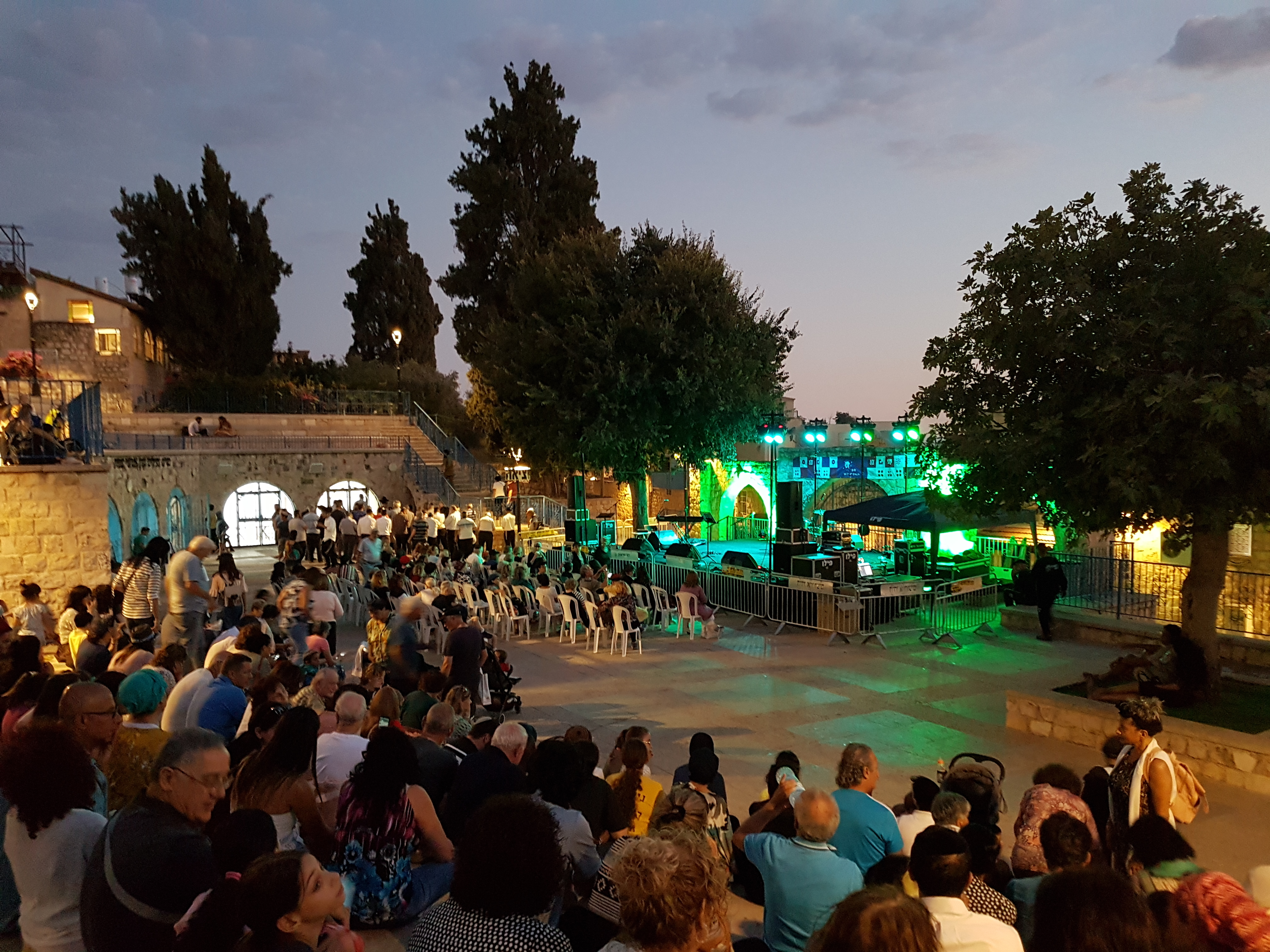
- Nickname: Klezmer Festival
- Genre: Klezmer, Jewish folk music
- Frequency: Annually
- Location: Safed
- Coordinates: 32.966206315837674, 35.49359199539537
- Country: Israel
- Years active: 1988 - Present
- Inaugurated: Summer 1988
- Founders: Zacharia Liraz

The International Klezmer Festival in Safed is a summer music festival held annually since 1988 in the city of Safed, Israel. The festival features performances by soloists and musical ensembles presenting traditional Jewish music and international soul music.

== History ==
In 1987, the Safed municipality and then-mayor Ze’ev Pearl sought to establish a festival in the city. Initially, the event was called "Singing in the Mountain." Around that time, Zacharia Liraz, who would go on to organize the festival, visited the Frenkel Frenel Museum, dedicated to the painter Isaac Frenkel Frenel. There, he saw a large, colorful painting of klezmer musicians against the backdrop of Mount Meron, which inspired him to establish a klezmer festival in Safed. Frenkel's paintings of klezmer musicians were influenced by Jewish weddings in Safed’s Jewish Quarter during the 1930s.

=== Origin of the name ===
The term klezmer derives from the Hebrew kli zemer, meaning "instrument of song." According to the European Institute of Jewish Music, by the 16th century, the term had come to denote the musician rather than the instrument. Historically, the word was also used colloquially to imply a disreputable or crude street musician. In the early 20th century, it was used to refer to self-taught performers who played popular melodies by ear at events like weddings, sometimes viewed with low social regard. According to cantor Shalom Berlinski, the label suggested a "bum" playing vulgar music. According to the European Institute of Jewish Music, in contemporary times klezmer is no longer used in a negative connotation and is used to describe both the musicians and the traditional Jewish instrumental music of Eastern Europe.

According to the Hebrew dictionary by Avraham Even-Shoshan, one meaning of the term "Klei Zemer" (musical instruments) refers to traditional musicians who play at weddings and family celebrations. In Eastern European Jewish communities, the term evolved phonetically into "Klezmer" or "Klezmorim," often pronounced with penultimate stress. The festival’s organizers adopted the term to emphasize the continuity of Jewish folk music traditions.

=== The festival ===
During the festival, special events are held in Safed, including workshops on Kabbalah and mysticism, guided musical tours accompanied by klezmer musicians, night tours with theatrical performances, and various street performances by musicians. There are also children’s activities such as a children's klezmer stage, storytelling sessions, and magic shows.

The festival is open and free to the public. Events take place in the alleys of the old city of Safed as well as the artists' quarter of Safed across several stages. It is considered the largest klezmer festival in Israel, both in terms of the number of performers and visitors, with audiences coming from across the country.

The festival was conceptualized, initiated, and artistically directed in its early years by Zacharia Liraz. In its early years, it was managed by Yaakov Agmon.

In 1991, the festival hosted over 100,000 visitors. Prizes were awarded to the best soloist and best ensemble, sponsored by Vered Hagalil.

Over the years, the festival has featured both klezmer artists and other performers from Jewish and Israeli musical genres. International performers have also participated, coming from countries such as the United States, the United Kingdom, Slovenia, Germany, Austria, and Croatia.

== See also ==
- Artists quarter of Safed
