= Janco Dada Museum =

Museum in Israel

Coordinates: 32°42′5.89″N 34°58′47.91″E

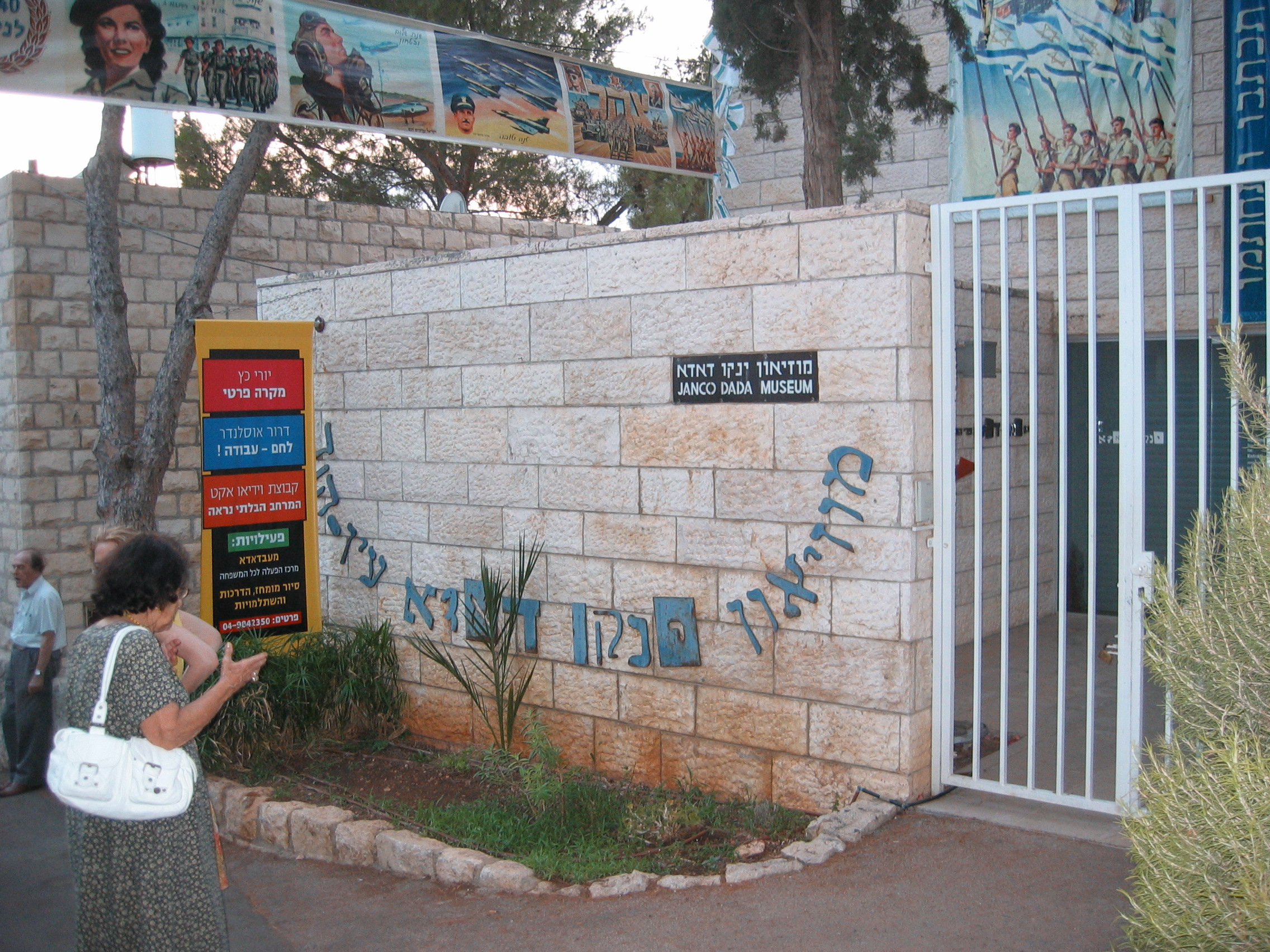
The Janco Dada Museum in Ein Hod, Israel

The Janco Dada Museum is located in Ein Hod, Israel. It is a museum that exhibits the work of Marcel Janco as well as art from the Dada movement and contemporary art.

The museum was established in 1983, by a group of Marcel Janco's friends, with the purpose of conserving the works and ideas of the sole Dadaist living in Israel.

Janco, who immigrated to Palestine in 1941, described himself as a romantic. In his eyes, Ein Hod was the perfect location for an artists' village, in the midst of nature, on the site of a deserted village, without electricity, water or roads.

== Establishment of the Museum ==
The driving force behind the establishment of the museum was Itche Mambush, together with Moshe Znaimer, who raised the funds for its construction. Among the founders of the museum were also Haim Bar-Lev, Haim Zadok, Aharon Rubinstein, Oded Messer, and Yosef Peker. Mambush persuaded Marcel Janco to donate a plot of land and fifty of his works for the project.

The museum building was designed by architect Moshe Zarhi on a voluntary basis. Zarhi described the design as follows: "The museum was designed as an inward-facing structure that includes a courtyard and entrance hall, a permanent exhibition hall, a temporary exhibition hall, open areas for performances, and auxiliary facilities. The halls and exhibition spaces, with their varying dimensions, are interconnected and create a continuous spatial sequence. Here will be displayed the works of Marcel Janco, each with its appropriate setting."

The cornerstone for the museum was laid in July 1981. The museum was built by contractor Zechariah Drucker and inaugurated on 21 June 1983 in the presence of the President of Israel.

== See also ==
- Artists quarter of Safed
- Frenkel Frenel Museum
- Marcel Janco
