= South Lebanon Township =

South Lebanon Township may refer to:

- South Lebanon Township, Sharp County, Arkansas, in Sharp County, Arkansas
- South Lebanon Township, Pennsylvania

== See also ==
- Lebanon Township (disambiguation)
- North Lebanon Township (disambiguation)
