= Air Traffic Control Command =

Israeli military unit

- מערך הבקרה האווירית
- Insignia of the Air Traffic Control Command
- Active: 1978–present
- Country: Israel
- Allegiance: Israel Defense Forces
- Branch: Israeli Air Force

Commanders
- Current commander: Aluf mishne R.

The Air Traffic Control and Flight Supervision Command (Hebrew: מערך הבקר האווירית ופיקוח הטיסה) is the Israeli Air Force unit responsible for the Air traffic control.

The Southern Air Traffic Control Unit is located near Mitzpe Ramon and was established in 1965.

During Israel–Hezbollah conflict, Hezbollah targeted the Northern Air Traffic Control Unit on Mount Meron.
