= Levanon =

Levanon (Hebrew: לְבָנוֹן) is Hebrew for Lebanon. It is also an Israeli surname. Notable people with the surname include:

- Chaim Levanon (1899–1986), Israeli politician
- Itzhak Levanon (1944–2023), Israeli diplomat
- Malin Levanon (born 1977), Swedish actress
- Mordechai Levanon (1901–1968), Israeli painter
- Nehemiah Levanon (1915–2003), Israeli politician
- Yaacov Levanon (1895–1965), Israeli musician and composer

== See also ==
- HaLevanon, a Hebrew-language newspaper published between 1863 and 1886
- Lebanon (disambiguation)
