= Lebanon metropolitan area =

The Lebanon metropolitan area may refer to:

- The Lebanon, Pennsylvania metropolitan area, United States
- The Lebanon, Missouri micropolitan area, United States
- The Claremont–Lebanon micropolitan area, New Hampshire and Vermont, United States, formerly the Lebanon micropolitan area

== See also ==
- Lebanon (disambiguation)
