= Artists Quarter of Safed =

Major group of artists in Safed

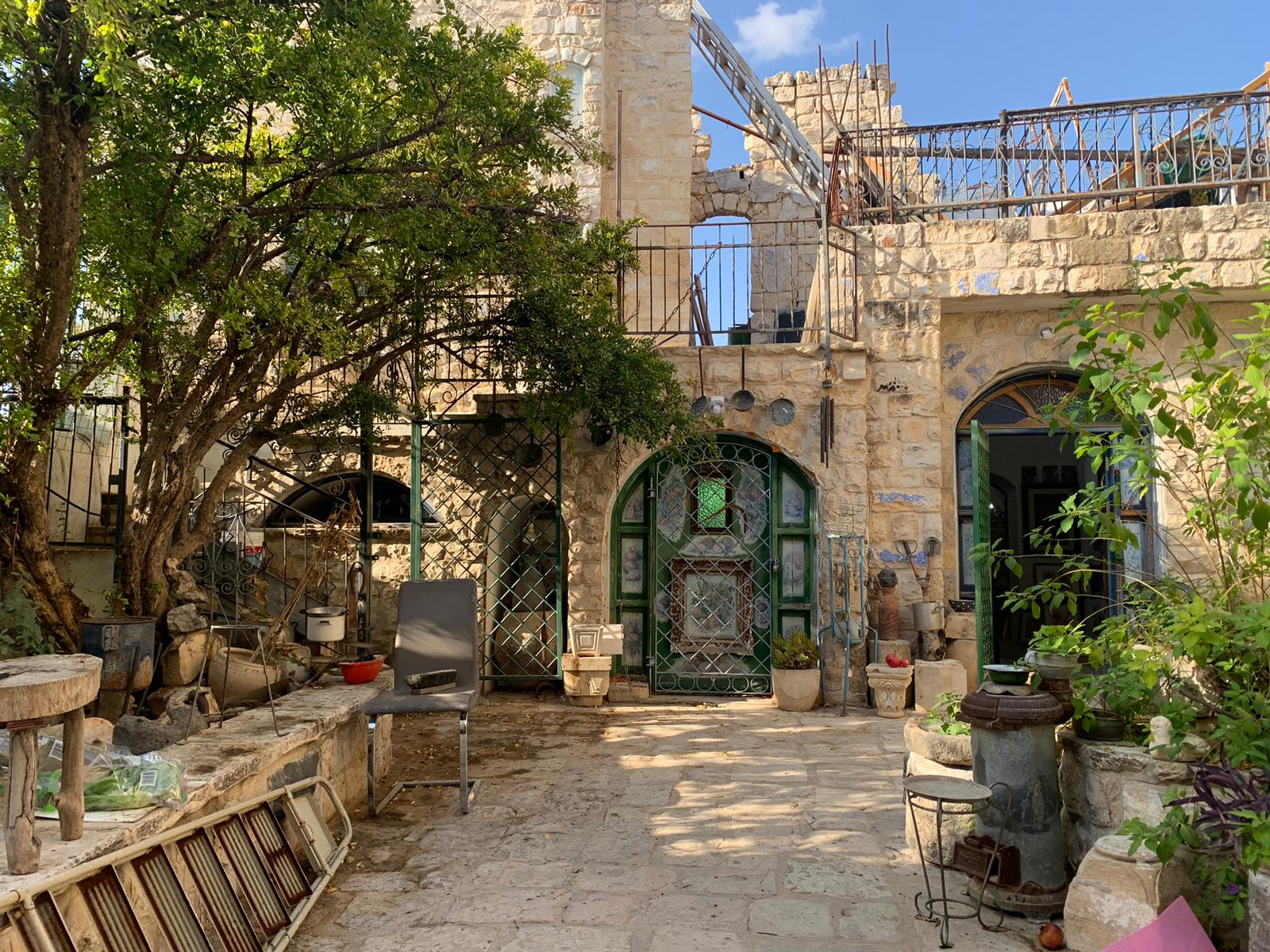
Artists Quarter, Safed

The Artists' Quarter in Safed, also known as the Artists' Colony, refers to both the community of artists of Safed as well as their area of residence. It is located on the border of the historic Jewish quarter. The first to discover Safed's artistic aura was Isaac Frenkel Frenel in 1920, followed by Moshe Castel and Mordechai Levanon in the 1930s. This attracted dozens of other artists to the Quarter. In the 1950s with the encouragement of the Safed municipality, artists were invited to restore ruins in the Mamluk neighborhood of Harat al-Wata, in order to open galleries and exhibitions.

Safed's mystic aura attracted a wide range of Israeli artists affiliated with different art movements, perhaps most notably the Jewish School of Paris spearheaded by Frenkel.

From the 1970s and onward, the Artists' Quarter began to lose its cachet following the deaths of the founding generation. Neglected infrastructure, lack of state support and demographic changes furthered the decline.

== History ==
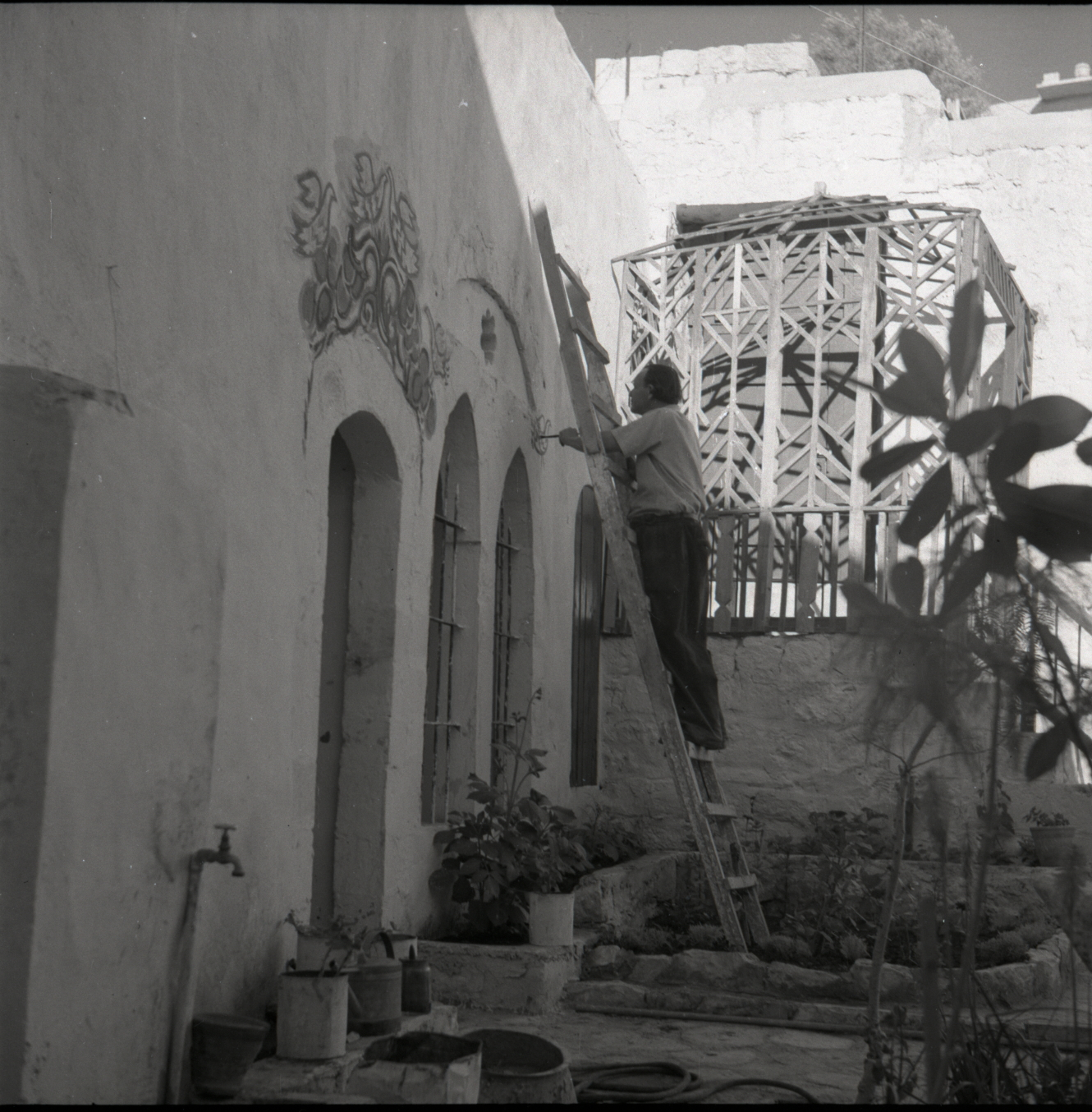
Yitzhak Frenkel paints a fresco on the wall of his home, July 1952

Artists began to settle in Safed before the establishment of the state. Isaac Frenkel Frenel one of the first Safed painters, began to paint the city in the 20s of the 20th century and settled in the city as early as 1934. In 1942 Frenkel organized the first exhibition of paintings in Safed, (the entrance fee was only one penny). Frenkel was one of the founders of Safed's Artists' Quarter, although he did not see himself as part of the artists' community. Members of the founding core of artists include: Shimshon Holtzman, Aryeh Lerner and his painter wife Hanna Lerner, Aryeh Merzer, Isaac Frenkel, Moshe Castel and Menachem Shemi. The artists were given support and encouragement by Safed's first mayor, Moshe Pedatzur.

In parallel to the opening of the 'General Exhibition' in which the Safed artists participated, the Kiryat HaOmanim Association was established. Membership was based on living in Safed and owning property in the artists' quarter.

== Artistic appeal ==
Safed had long attracted artists due to its mystical and romantic appeal. It was a hotbed of motifs for Israeli art. It presented a vision and diversity of tradition Jewish life, be it the Klezmer musicians with the distinctive Jewish grab and musical instruments. The Sephardic or Ashkenazi communities, the Hassidic communities, the famous synagogues such as Abuhav Synagogue or the HaAri Synagogue; whilst also due to its geography has a mountainous arrangement and a view toward Mount Meron and the sloping mountains about it. All of these brought many major and minor artists to travel and live in the ancient city; recognizing the artistic potential of city. Some have compared the artistic activity in Safed to that of the Barbizon group on the outskirt of Fontainbleu which attracted naturalist and impressionist painters. Frenkel Frenel, Rolly Sheffer and other artists were heavily inspired by the stunning panoramas and views that Tzfat offered them of Mt Meron, something that is very visible in their work. Tzfat, one of the four holy cities of Judaism provided a powerful emotional scenery to those artists who visited. Frenkel Frenel and others who were influenced by the Ecole de Paris showcased the mystics of Tzfat with the avantgarde movements they pertained to, painting with colors that reflect the dynamism and spirituality of the ancient city, painting the fiery or serene sunsets over Mt Meron. The mountains were painted purple, the skies in a burnish red. Marc Chagall would walk the streets and paint portraits of religious children.

== Ambience ==
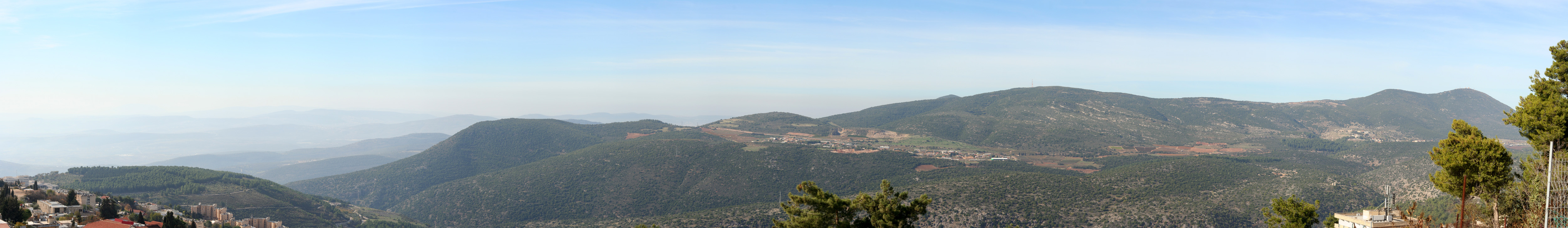
Mount Meron which lies opposite to Safed was a major motif of Safed artists.

A club was established which served as a gathering place for resident artists, guest artists from the center of the country and those who enjoyed the bohemian atmosphere. The club was run by a women's committee, mostly artists' wives, but also artists in their own right. They organized programs for Friday and Saturday evenings, holidays and the "end of the season" at the end of Sukkot, before some of the artists returned to Tel Aviv. Social activity helped to forget the dire economic situation in the years after 1948 Palestine war (austerity). The artists who loved the good life used to pay for their meals in restaurants and hotels with works of art. This is how the hoteliers and restaurateurs of Safed gathered fine art collections.

Yosef Zaritsky visited Safed in 1924 with Menahem Shemi. According to Dalia Manor, he was inspired by the rich Jewish history of Safed, with its tradition of Kabbalah.

== School of Paris ==
The School of Paris in the Artists' Quarter of Safed of the 1950s and 1960s, was presented in 2014 at the Hecht Museum in Haifa under the curatorship of Sorin Heller. The exhibition examined Safed's artists' connection to the Ecole de Paris. The exhibition presented a variety of works by major artists who worked in this place in the 1950s and 1960s.

Among the Israeli artists influenced by the School of Paris who settled in Safed were Rolly Schaffer, Shimshon Holzman and Mordechai Levanon. One of the School of Paris's chief practitioners, Yitzhak Frenkel, also lived and worked in Safed.

== Other art movements ==
Several members of the Ofakim Hadashim movement settled and worked in Safed. These include Moshe Castel, Avigdor Stematsky, Yechezkel Streichman and more.

== Today ==
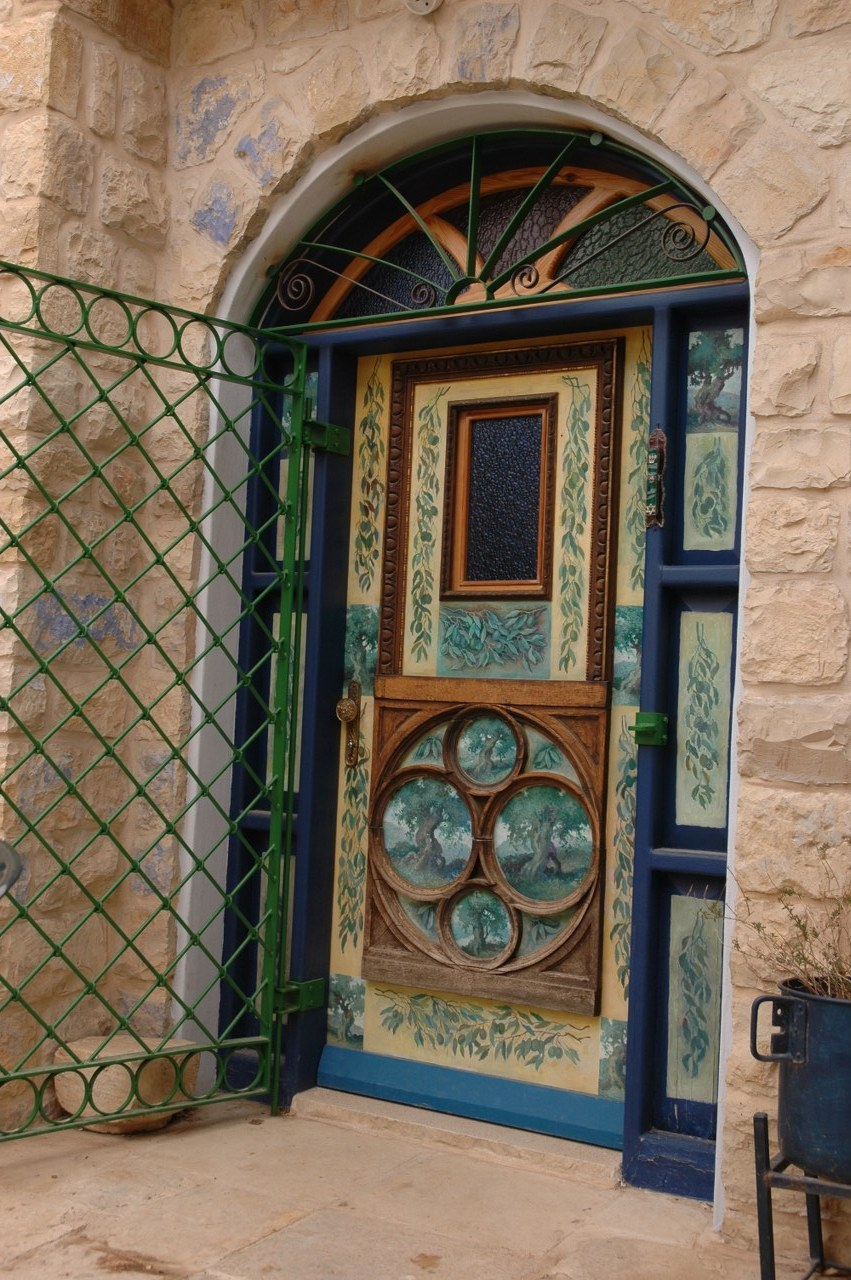
Door in Beit Castel Gallery, Safed, made by Yaacov Hadad and Rolly Schaffer

Although the quarter no longer boasts the impressive artistic population it once had, it still hosts several places of cultural importance. Among them, the "General Exhibition" in the old mosque of the quarter, the Frenkel Frenel Museum, the Beit Castel Gallery, the Makemat School for Oriental Music. The museum of art of printing displaying the first Hebrew press is located in the city. The museum of Hungarian speaking Jewery is also located in the quarter and houses exhibitions focused on Central European Jewish culture.
