= The Beauty Queen of Jerusalem =

Israeli television melodrama series

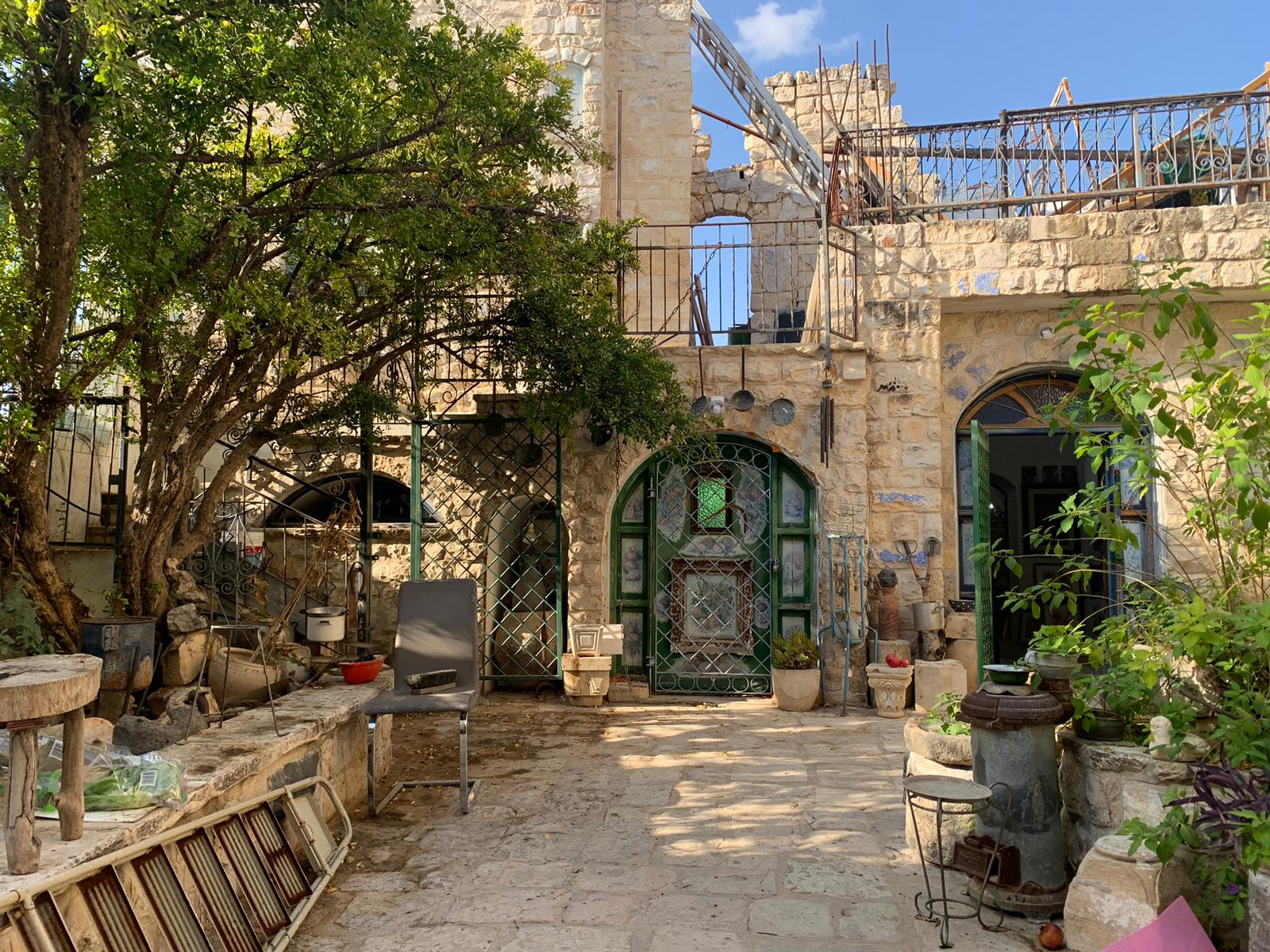
- Beit Castel, the main filming location of the series. The series was mostly shot in Safed
- מלכת היופי של ירושלים
- Genre: Melodrama
- Directed by: Oded Davidoff
- Country of origin: Israel
- Original languages: Hebrew, Ladino
- No. of seasons: 3
- No. of episodes: 40

Production
- Running time: 24–29 minutes
- Production company: yes

Original release
- Network: Yes Drama (Israel); Netflix (International)
- Release: 7 June 2021 – 24 March 2023

The Beauty Queen of Jerusalem (Hebrew: מלכת היופי של ירושלים) is an Israeli television series based on the novel of the same name by Sarit Yishai-Levi.

== Overview ==
The series started airing on June 7, 2021, on the Yes Drama channel. The first two episodes of the series have been available on Yes VOD since June 3, 2021. At an event held in East Tel Aviv in December 2021, Yes unveiled its new original productions for 2022. It officially announced that the series had been renewed for a second season, which was screened toward the end of 2022.

Filming of the series began in the summer of 2020 in various locations in the city of Safed, among them, at the Frenkel Frenel Museum and the Beit Castel Gallery.

It closed the Israel Film Festival in Los Angeles in May 2022.

The first half of Season 1 premiered on Netflix in the UK, France, the U.S., Argentina, Poland, Portugal, Spain, and other areas of Europe on May 20, 2022, and the second half premiered in the same regions on July 29, 2022. Season 1 became available on Netflix in Australia, Canada, The Netherlands, New Zealand, and South Africa on February 9, 2023.

Season 2, re-edited as 16 episodes from its original broadcast of 26 episodes in Israel, became available on Netflix in all the aforementioned countries above on July 14, 2023.

== Plot summary ==
The series tells the story of the Ermoza family, intertwined with the history during Ottoman rule and then under the British Mandate for Palestine. It also explores the family's fortunes during the subsequent periods of depression and war.

The series' timeline alternates the present and the past. The plot is centered around Gabriel Ermoza (Michael Aloni), his wife Rosa (Hila Saada), and their three daughters: Luna (Swell Ariel Or) (the eldest, who is her father's favorite), Rachelika, and Becky. The relationship between Gabriel and Luna contrasts with his lack of love for his wife, Rosa. Rosa's jealousy of Luna leads to complex conflicts in the family.

== Cast ==
- Swell Ariel Or as Luna Ermoza
- Michael Aloni as Gabriel Ermoza
- Hila Saada as Rosa Ermoza
- Irit Kaplan as Mercada Ermoza
- Mali Levi as Victoria Franco
- Tom Hagi as Ephraim Siton
- Eli Steen as Rachelika Ermoza
- Bar Tzidkiahu as Rivka (Becky) Ermoza
- Tomer Barash as Sgt. Bill Evans
- Israel Ogalbo as David Franco
- Yuval Scharf as Rochel Leibowitz
- Tamir Ginsburg as Itamar Ben Moshe
- Itzik Cohen as Avraham
- Luna Mansour as Aisha
- Hisham Sulliman as Kahlil
- Shely Ben Joseph as Matilda Franco
- Moris Cohen as Raphael Ermoza
- Roi Miller as James Brown
- Miki Kam as Gilda
- Sarel Piterman as Kalman Leibowitz
- Dov Navon as Alfred Zachs
- Yarden Tusia-Cohen as Gisele
- Uria Hayik as Dror
- Omer Dror as Tzachi Toledano
- Kobi Maor as Morduch
- Shahir Kabaha as Mustafa
- Oren Yadger as Liyto
- Kim Or Azulay as Aamalia
- Ashot Gasparian as Matzliach
- Shira Abarbanel as Nava Ben-Moshe
- Dan Mor as Yehiel

== Production ==
After the novel sold more than 300,000 copies, Yes Drama bought the rights and adapted the book The Beauty Queen of Jerusalem as a daily melodrama series. The creators are the screenwriters Shlomo Mashiach, Esther Namdar Tamam, and director Oded Davidoff, with Artza Production. Filming for the series began in the summer of 2020 in various locations in the city of Safed, including the Frenkel Frenel Museum and the Beit Castel gallery.

The daily TV series is based on the plot of the novel. The novel tells the story of the Ermoza family of Jerusalem. They are a Ladino-Sephardic family that was cursed: The women who marry into the family are not loved by their husbands. The novel follows three generations of family from before the establishment of Israel until the 1970s.

The theme song is written by Daniel Salomon.
