= Líbano (disambiguation) =

Líbano or El Líbano may refer to:

- Líbano, Argentina
- Líbano, Colombia
- Líbano, Costa Rica
- El Líbano, Panama

== See also ==
- Lebanon (disambiguation)
