= Mordechai Levanon =

Israeli painter (1901–1968)

Mordechai Levanon מרדכי לבנון
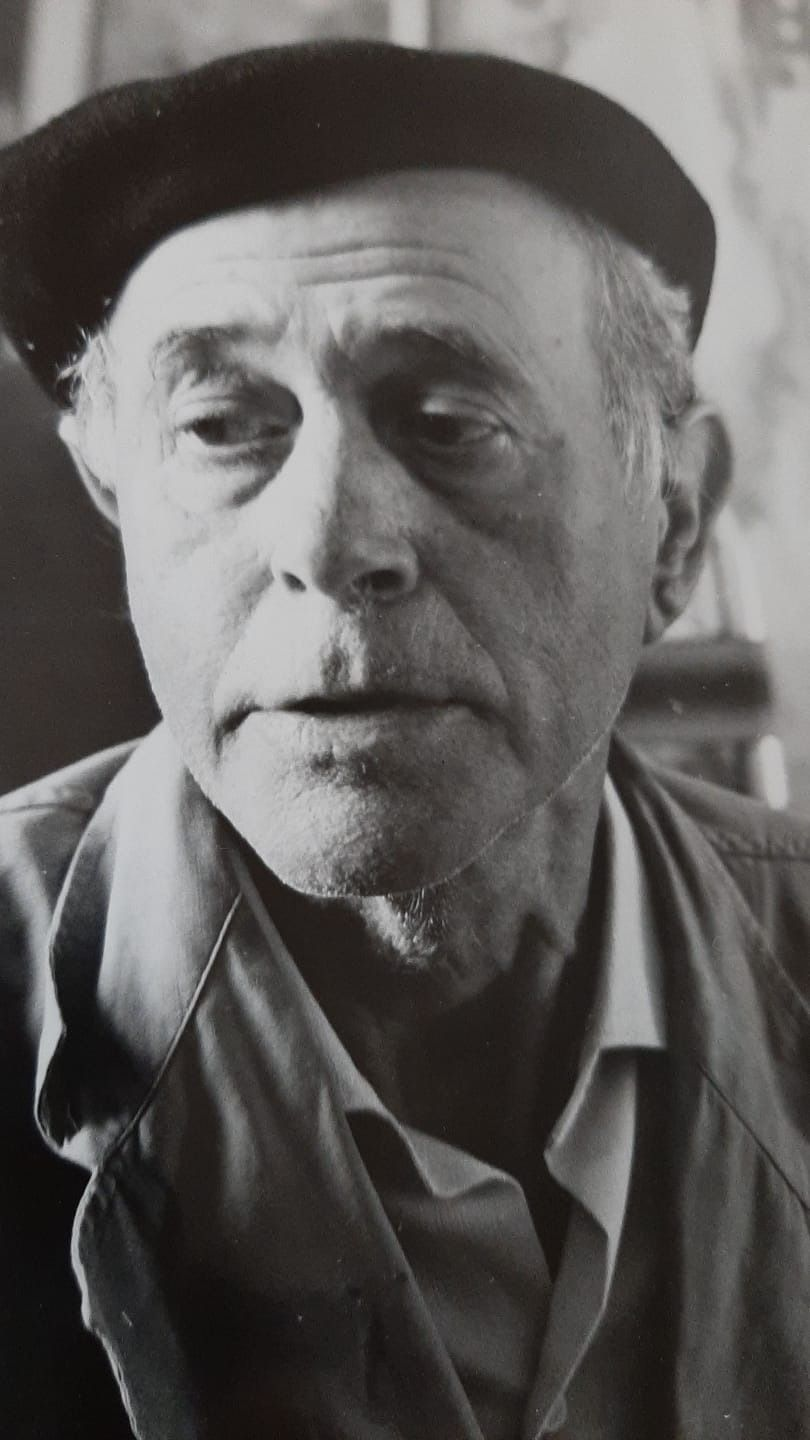
- Born: Morderchai Weiss; 7 February 1901 near Oradea, Austria-Hungary (now Romania)
- Died: 20 October 1968 (aged 67); Jerusalem
- Education: Isaac Frenkel's Histadrut Art School
- Style: Expressionism
- Movement: Ecole de Paris
- Spouse: Rachel Goldfinger
- Children: 3
- Awards: Dizengoff Prize 1940, 1961

Mordechai Levanon (Hebrew: מרדכי לבנון; 1901 - 1968) was an Israeli painter. He was one of the foremost Israeli landscape painters. He was the winner of the Dizengoff prize in 1940 and 1961. He was enchanted by Erez Israel's light, and the cities of Safed and Jerusalem; all of which feature heavily in his paintings.

== Early life ==
Levanon was born as Mordechai Weiss in a village near the city of Oradea in Transylvania, in the Austro-Hungarian Empire (now in Romania). He began studying painting with his older brother while in Romania, who was also a painter. In 1921 he immigrated to Israel and joined the Histadrut. He studied for a few months at Bezalel. Until 1925 he worked as an agricultural laborer in the "Labor Battalion" in the Galilee Hebrew settlements, and later as a construction worker. From 1925 to 1927, he studied in the studio of the Yitzhak Frenkel (Frenel), and lived in the Mahloll neighborhood in Tel Aviv. After that he left his side jobs and devoted himself to painting.

As the son of a rabbi in a town in Transylvania, he knew the Holy Land from Bible stories, and when he arrived in Israel, his textual understanding of the place merged with its physical landscapes. In 1929, he was part of the "Massad" group and participated in exhibitions of the artists of Israel.

== Between Jerusalem and Safed ==
In 1938, he settled in Jerusalem. In 1963 he opened a studio in Safed, seeking its spirituality, and since then divided his time between it and Jerusalem.

Levanon presented solo exhibitions and participated in group exhibitions in Israel and abroad. Levanon died in Jerusalem in 1968 after a long illness. He was married to Rachel née Goldfinger. He had two sons and a daughter.

== Art ==
Mordechai Levanon was heavily influenced by his teacher, Isaac Frenkel. Through his mentor, Levanon was influenced by modern art trends in France and especially Paris. Thus his work is reminiscent of Frenkel, Soutine, Kikoine and other painters of the Ecole de Paris. Levanon was also influenced by Van Gogh, and like him took to painting vivid landscapes.

Mordechai Levanon chose a special path among Israeli landscape painters. His paintings are based on actual landscapes that serve as a starting point for the work. The artist re-creates them on the canvas in a fairly free manner with changing color and perspective, until they look float, full of mysticism. The paintings are like ecstatic visions rather than an actual landscape. In his work, the spiritual history of the holy cities of Jerusalem and Safed is translated into colors and shapes. The influence of his style is evident in the Kabbalistic paintings of his friend, David Rakie.

Some of his works are held by the Israel Museum.

== A Selection of solo exhibitions ==
- 1939, 1940 - gallery Katz in Tel aviv
- 1944 - Habima theatre Gallery, Tel Aviv
- 1946 - Artists' House, Haifa
- 1948 - Tel Aviv Museum of Art, Tel Aviv
- 1960 - Tel Aviv Museum of Art, Tel Aviv
- 1966 - Ein Harod Museum of Art, Ein Harod
- 1968 - Israel Museum, Jerusalem
- 1969 - Artists' House, Jerusalem
- 1971 - Tel Aviv Museum of Art, Tel Aviv

== See also ==
- School of Paris
- Isaac Frenkel
- Shimshon Holzman
- Rolly Schaffer
- Artists Colony of Safed
