= Rolly Schaffer =

Rolly Schaffer רולי שפר
- Born: 1947; Bucharest, Romania
- Died: 2011 (aged 63–64); Israel
- Education: Nicolai Grigorescu Academy of Art, under Yitzhak Frenkel Frenel in Safed, Grand Chamiere
- Known for: Painting, Drawing, Sketches
- Style: Pointillism, Neo Impressionism, Post Impressionism
- Movement: Pointillism

Rolly Schaffer (Hebrew: רולי שפר) was born in Bucharest, Romania in 1947. Known for his Pointillist and neo-impressionist art. His work was marked by a synthesis of European Art and inspiration from Safed and its atmosphere. He lived in Romania, France and Israel where he died in 2011 in Israel. Several of his works are displayed in Beit Castel Gallery in Safed.

== Biography and Education ==
Rolly Schaffer was born in Bucharest, Romania in 1947. Known for his Pointillist and neo-impressionist art. He often painted his adopted town Safed. He studied art at the Nicolai Grigorescu Academy of Art (under surrealistic painter Jules Perahim). Rolly Schaffer moved with his family to Paris in 1964 for 2 years after which they settled in Safed, Israel.

In Safed he studied under Yitzhak Frenkel Frenel. After his military service, he finished his studies in the Grand Chamiere in Paris. After two years he returned and settled in Safed, joining other painters such as Moshe Castel, Shimshon Holzman, Yitzhak Frenkel Frenel and others that chose Safed as their lair.

He would live in Safed for the rest of his life.

== Style ==
Rolly Schaffer was influenced by his teachers as well as the students that surrounded him during his formation. While studying in the Grand Chamiere, he encountered the works of impressionist, expressionist, pointillists and other painters. Neo impressionists such as Seurat and Signac had a lasting influence on the young artist. Schaffer grew interested in the unique techniques of the two which were oriented by scientific analysis of both the harmony and the clash of colours simultaneously.

He applied his canvases with different drabs of primary colours and thus creating a sense of movement whilst the eye looked from afar.

Upon his return to Safed he began to develop his own artistsic style, a unique clash and synthesis between local traditions and European art. His style is characterised by rich colours, precise compositions, all of which are achieved through the use of radiant dots and colours. Through this newfound language he succeeded in conveyeing a dramatic atmosphere to the doors, ancient alleys and windows of his canvases. Through his art he attempted to reveal Safed's mystic aura.

Schaffer's work is marked by the synthesis of unseen spirituality and concrete reality, which marked his style as a mixture of the European and the Safed tradition.

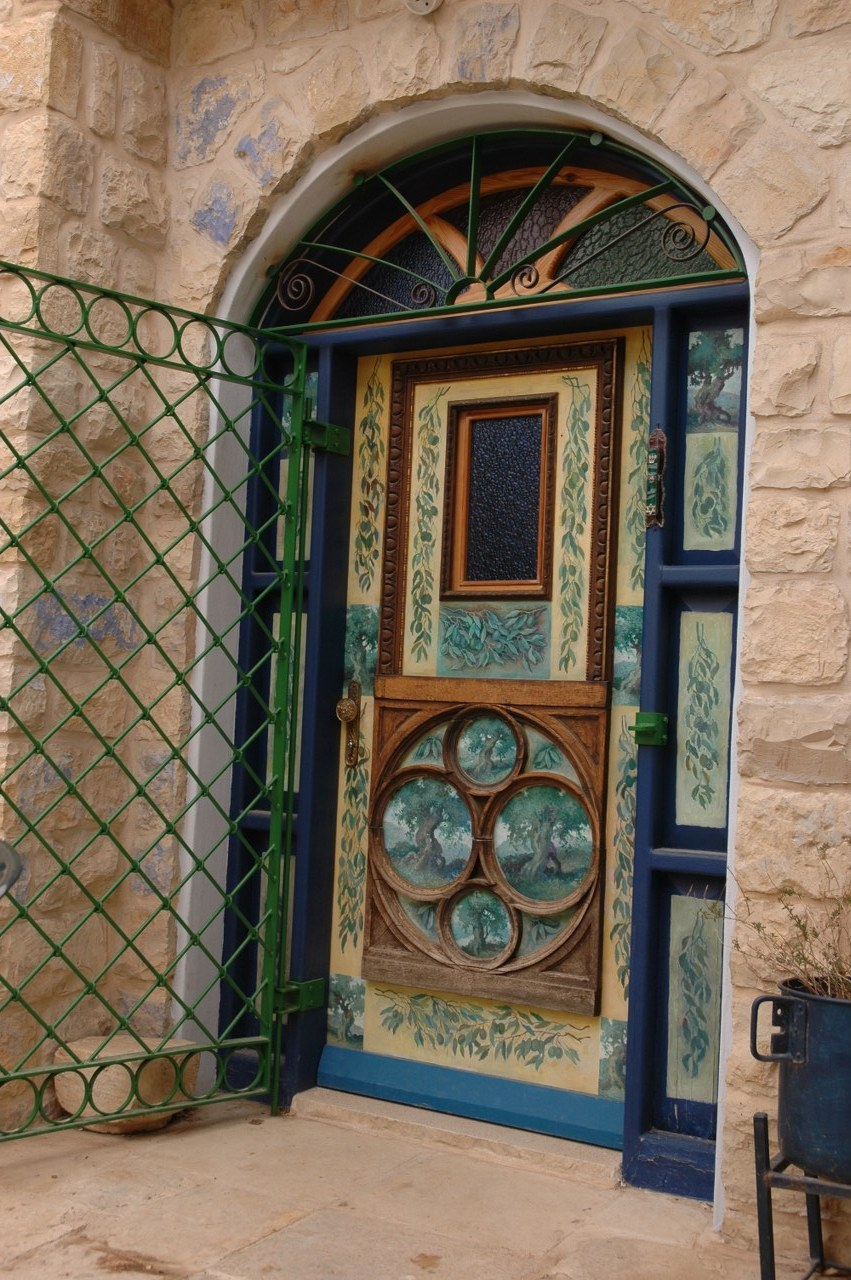
A door designed by Rolly Schaffer and Yaacov Hadad, in the Beit Castel Gallery

== See also ==
- Beit Castel Gallery
- Safed
- Isaac Frenkel Frenel
- Shimshon Holzman
- Pointillism (art)
