= South Lebanon (disambiguation) =

South Lebanon may refer to:

- 1978 South Lebanon conflict
- Free Lebanon State, a quasi-state also known as South Lebanon
- South Governorate, one of the governorates of Lebanon
- South Lebanon Army, of the country Lebanon
- South Lebanon security belt administration, a Christian provisional government in Israeli-occupied Lebanon
- Southern Lebanon, the geographical area of Lebanon
- South Lebanon conflict (1982–2000)
- South Lebanon conflict (disambiguation)
- South Lebanon Township (disambiguation)
  - South Lebanon Township, Pennsylvania, part of the Lebanon, Pennsylvania, metropolitan area
- South Lebanon, Ohio, a village in the United States
- South Lebanon, Oregon, a census-designated place in the United States
