= South Lebanon conflict =

South Lebanon conflict may refer to:

- Palestinian insurgency in South Lebanon (1968–1982)
- 1978 South Lebanon conflict
- South Lebanon conflict (1985–2000)
- 2006 Lebanon War
- Gaza war
- 2023 Israel–Lebanon border conflict

== See also ==
- Lebanon War (disambiguation)
- South Lebanon (disambiguation)
