= Beit Castel =

Beit Castel Gallery
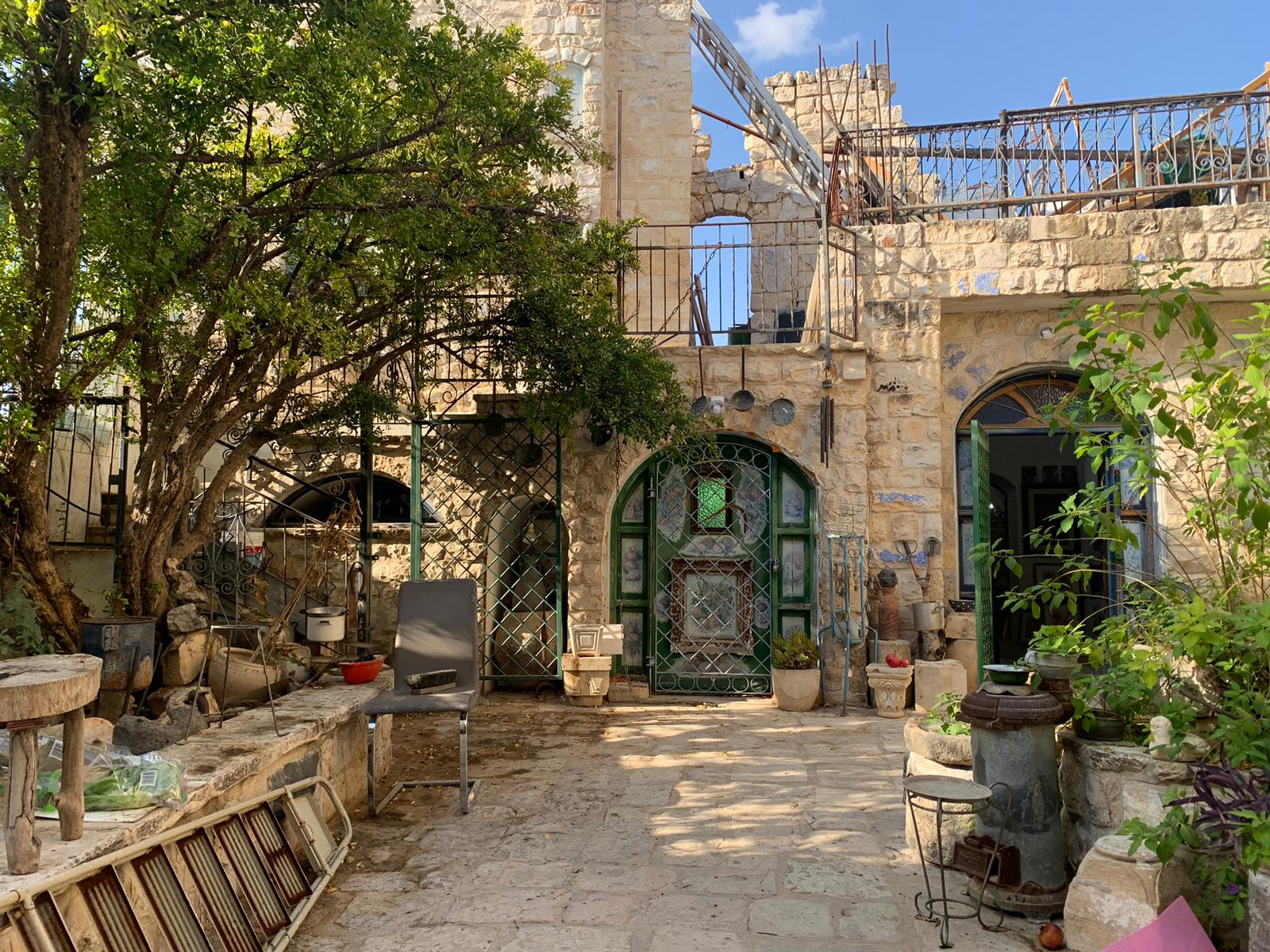
- The Courtyard
- Interactive map of the Beit Castel Gallery area

General information
- Architectural style: Local/Traditional
- Location: Safed, Israel, Tet Zayn 16 Safed
- Coordinates: 32.96577086°N 35.49406698°E
- Owner: Yaacov Hadad

Website
- https://www.beitcastel.com/

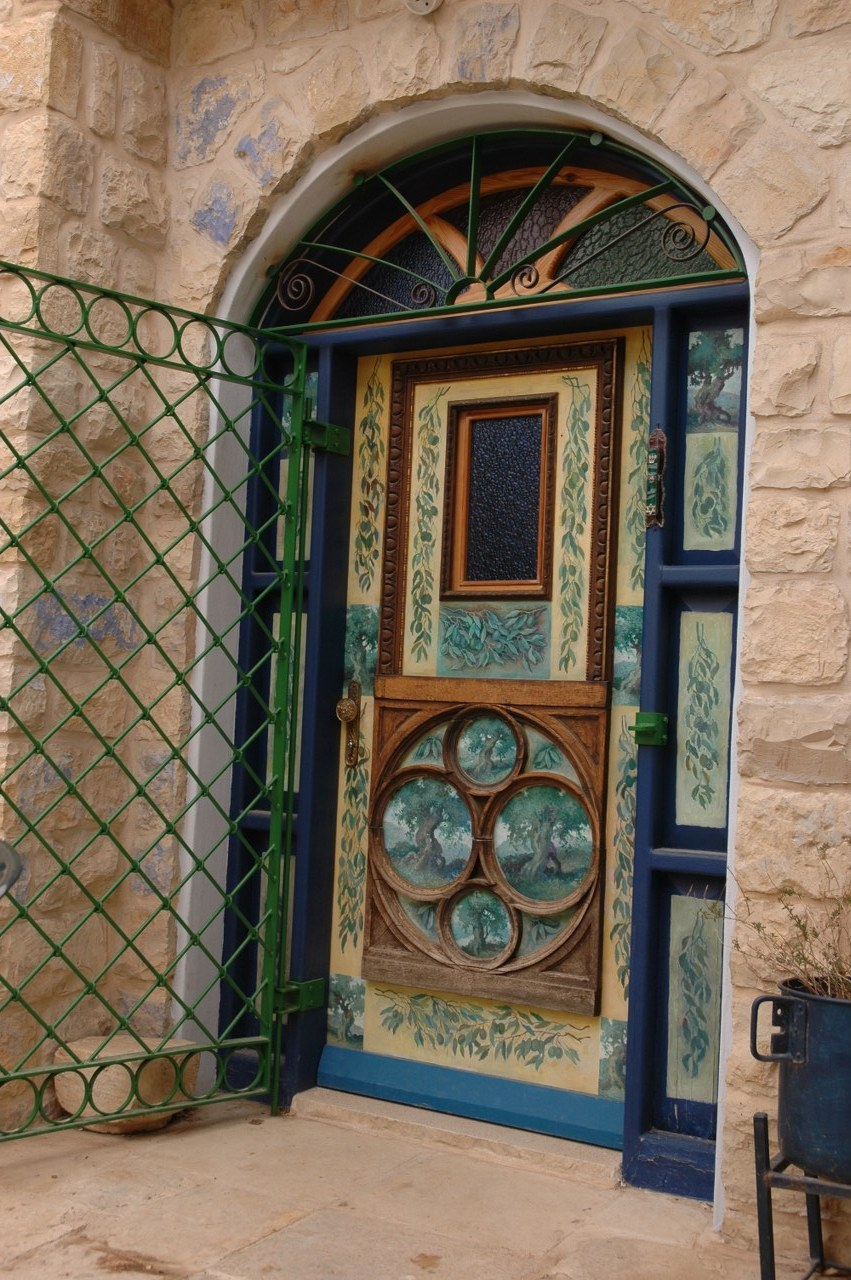
Door in the Beit Castel gallery, created by Yaacov Hadad and Rolly Schaffer

The Beit Castel gallery (Hebrew: בית קסטל) (House Of Castel), is a gallery in the Artists' Colony of Safed (Also known as Tzfat or Zefat) in Israel. The gallery hosts art of a diverse range of artists from the Artists' Quarter of Safed with a special focus on the golden age of art in Safed.

== History ==
Beit Castel used to be the home of the Israeli artist, Moshe Castel whose works are presented in the Vatican and Knesset. Castel was described by Gideon Ofrat in a Jerusalem Post as a singular artist in part due to his Volcanic ash art technique. The house, over time decayed was sold by Moshe Castel to his friend Yakov Hadad. Yakov Hadad as a boy was the court boy of Israeli giants such as Yitzhak Frenkel Frenel and Moshe Castel and used to assist others such as Nahum Gutman in order to make a bit of money for his family. Yakov Hadad has since rebuilt the gallery, turning the house itself into what was described by Israeli Channel 1 as a work of art.

In fact, the house (now gallery) itself is located in proximity to the houses of artists such as Shimshon Holzman and Yitzhak Frenkel Frenel in Yitzhak Frenkel Frenel/Moshe Castel streets (Tet'Vav/Tet'Zain street).

== Art ==
The art in the gallery was mostly produced by several well known artists of the quarter such as Yitzhak Frenkel Frenel, Shimshon Holzman, Rolly Schaffer, Moshe Castel, Aaron Yaackobson and others. The art in the gallery is a mixture of modern art from the early 20th century up into the modern day, representing the breadth of modern Jewish art in pre-state Israel and the modern state of Israel.

== Ambience ==
The gallery was described in the Yedioth Ahronot article as having a middle-eastern ambience thanks to its ornate gardens, trees and little courtyards. It contains a wide variety of ancient tools and stone works collected in part by Moshe Castel, Yakov Hadad and other Israeli artists who found those stoneworks among rubble, in the fields or in other locations.

== Film location ==
The Beit Castel gallery was the filming location of the Television series: The Beauty Queen of Jerusalem.

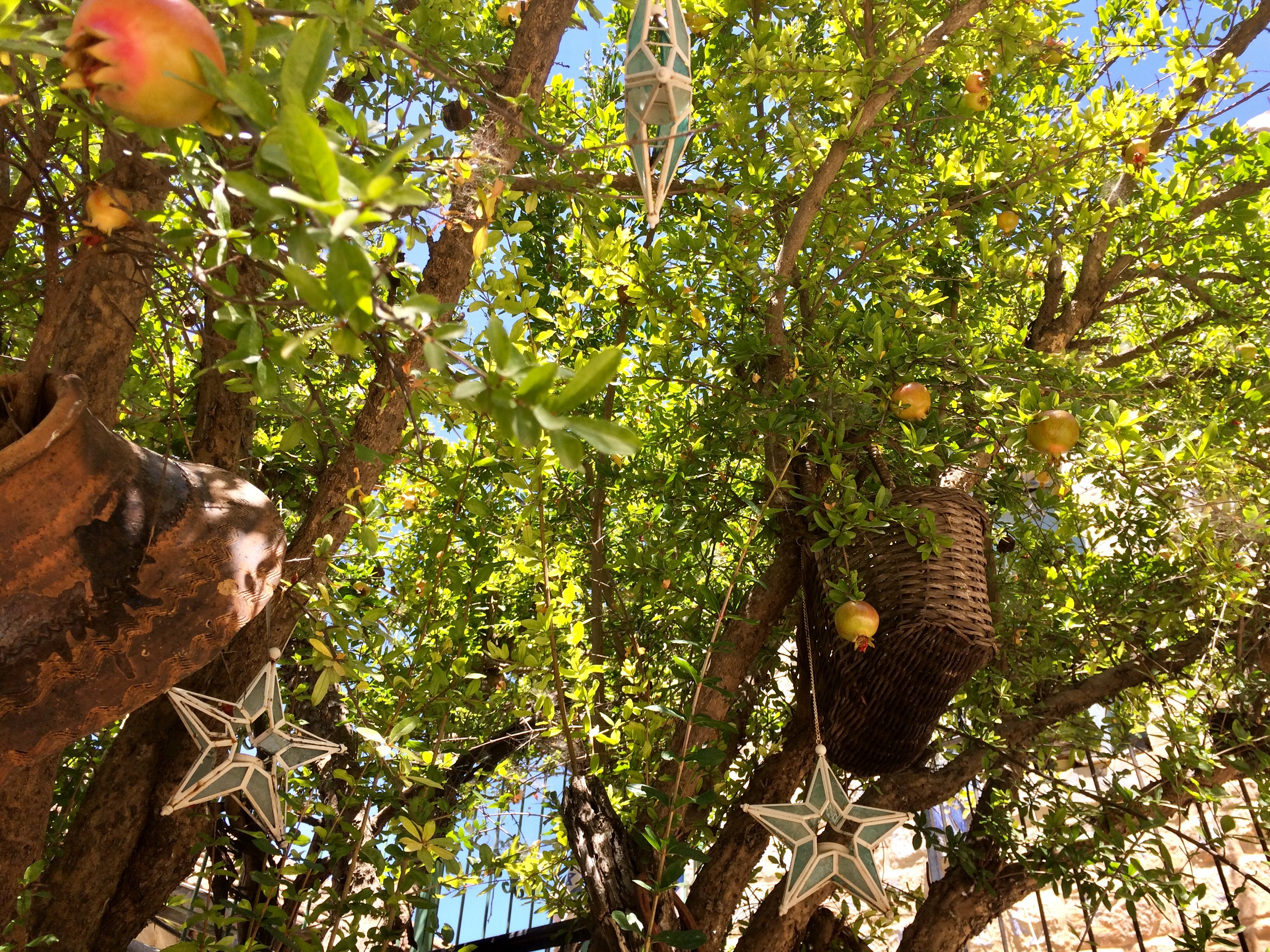
Pomegranate tree in Beit Castel

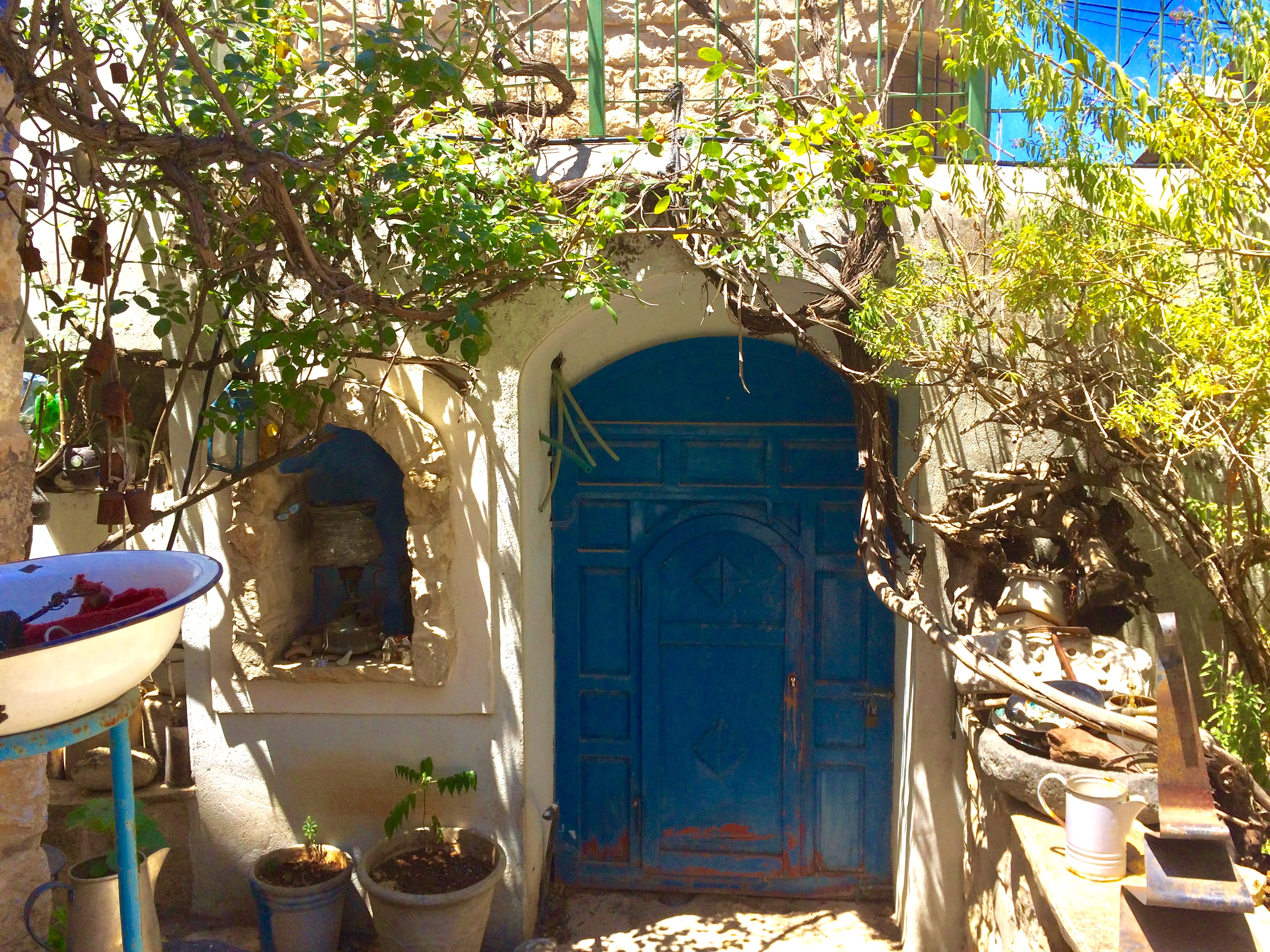
Blue door in the gallery

== See also ==
- Yitzhak Frenkel Frenel
- Moshe Castel
- Shimshon Holzman
- Safed
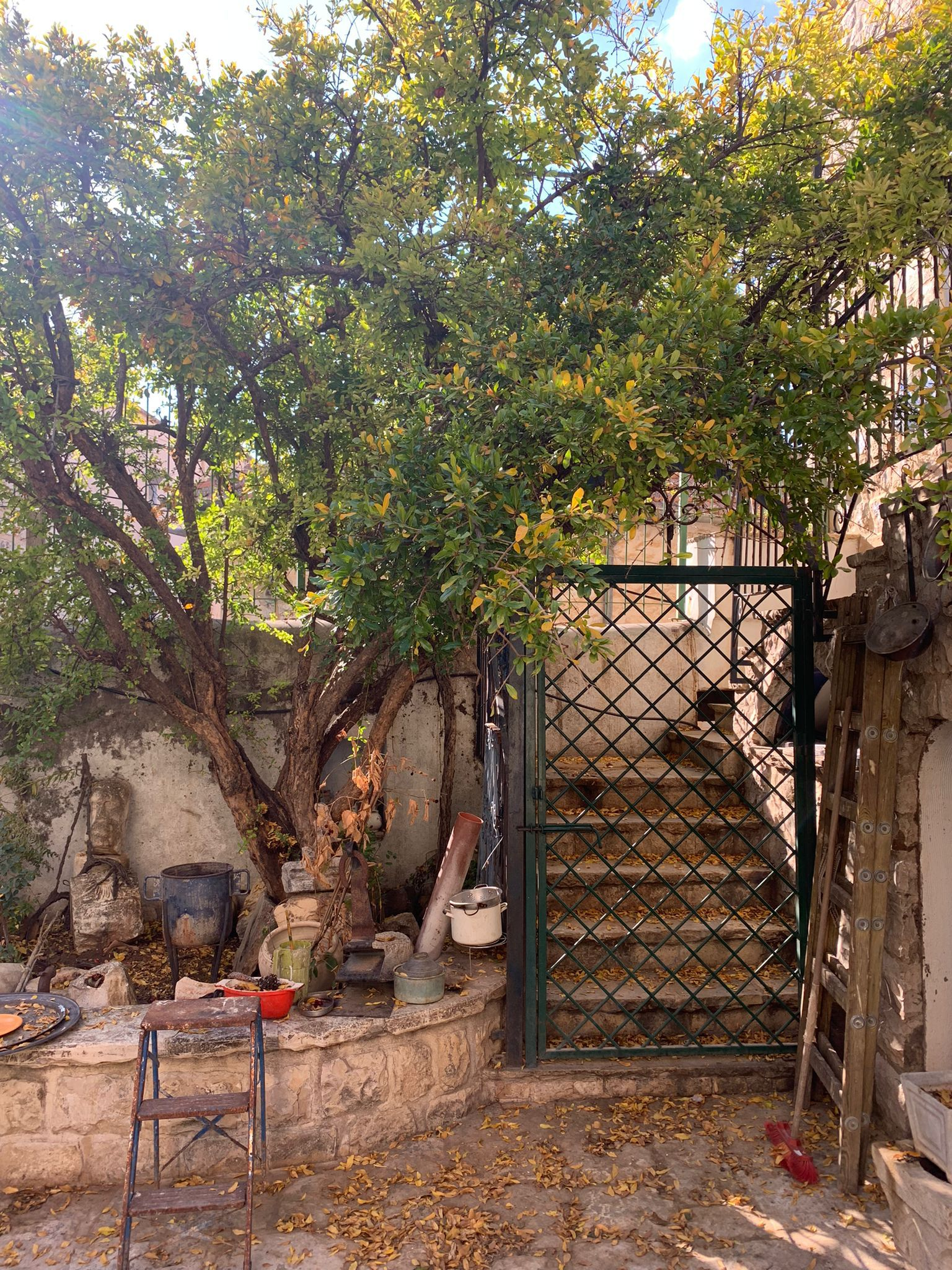
  Part of Beit Castel Courtyard
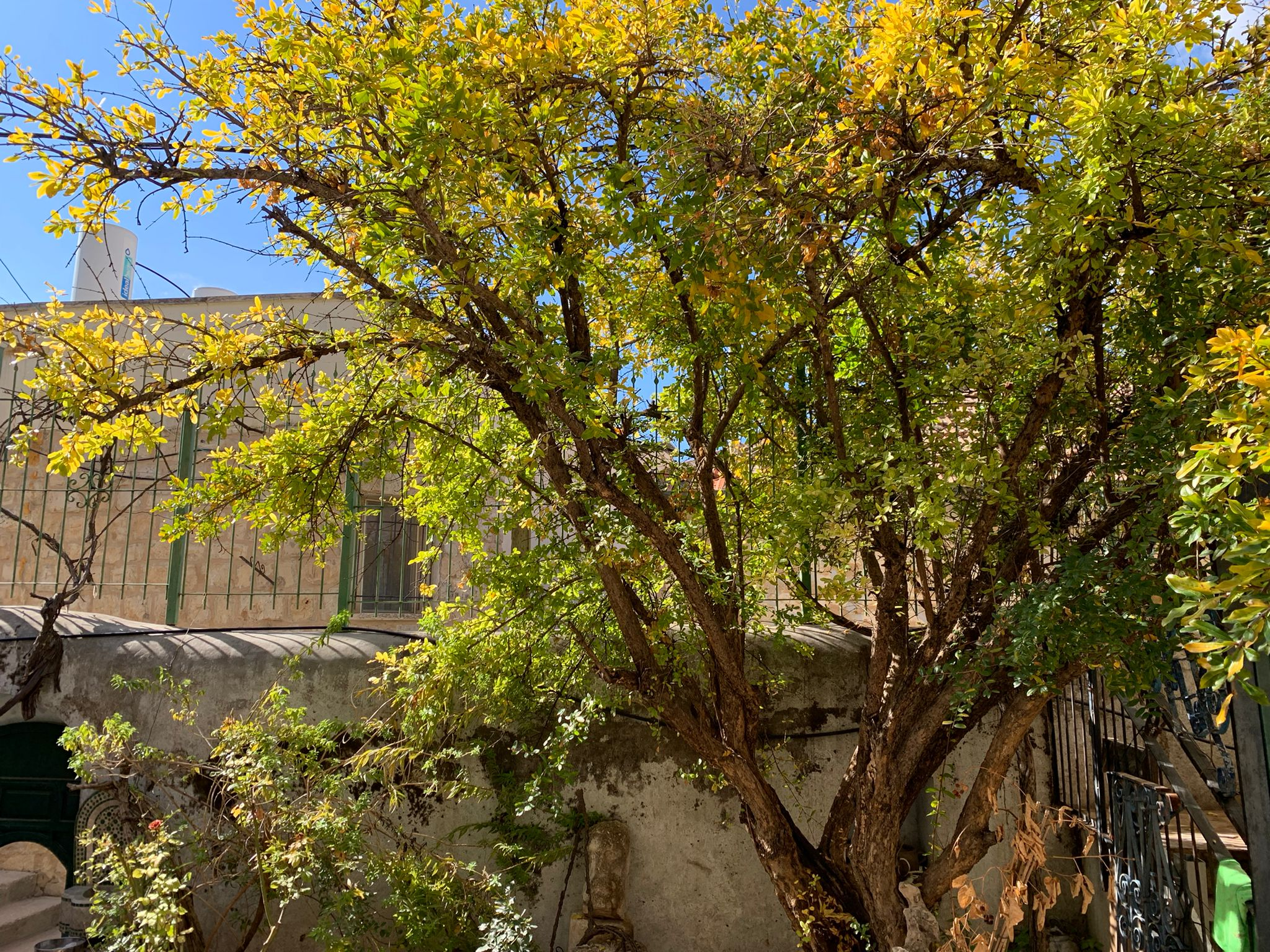
  Beit Castel Pomegranate Tree Autumn
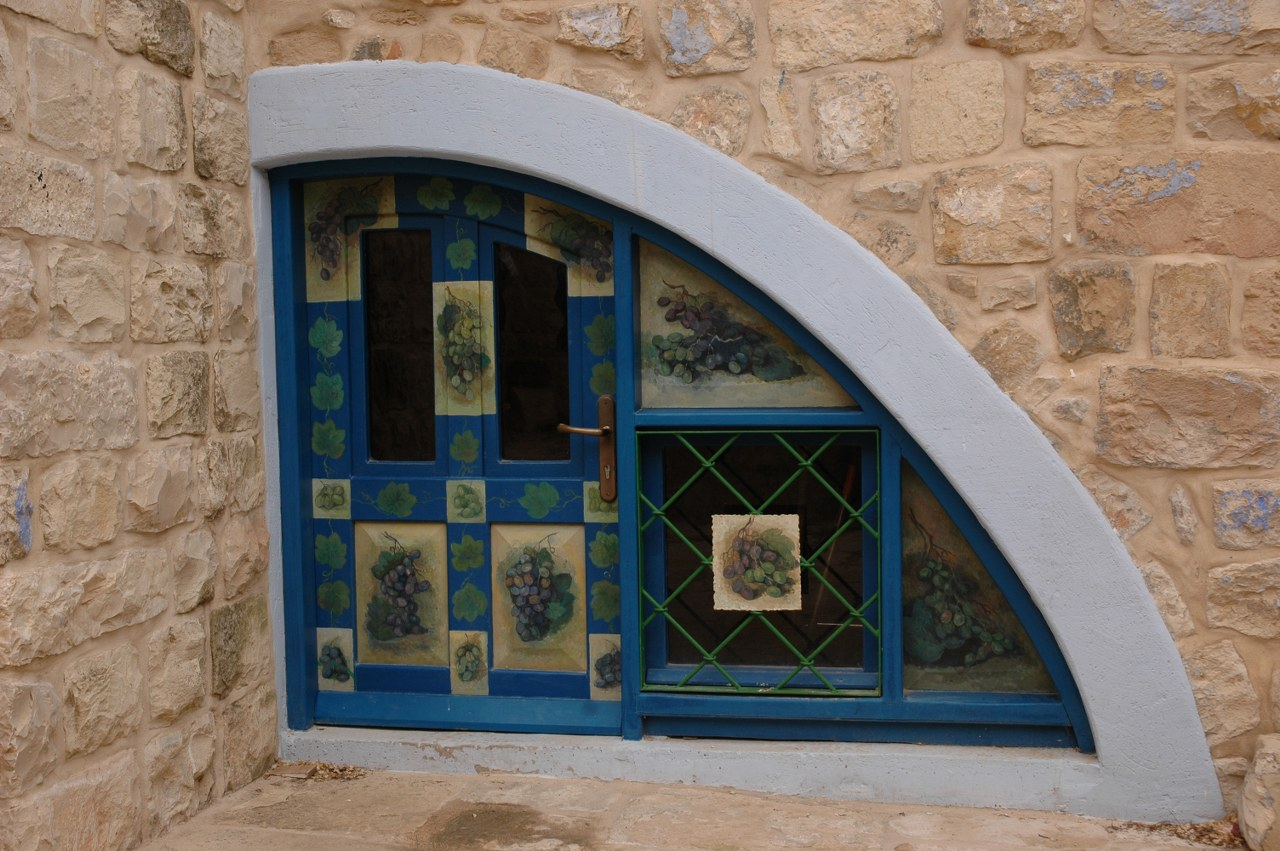
  Door in the gallery, designed and made by Yaacov Hadad and Rolly Schaffer
