= Omer Dror =

Israeli film and television actor (born 1990)

- עומר דרור
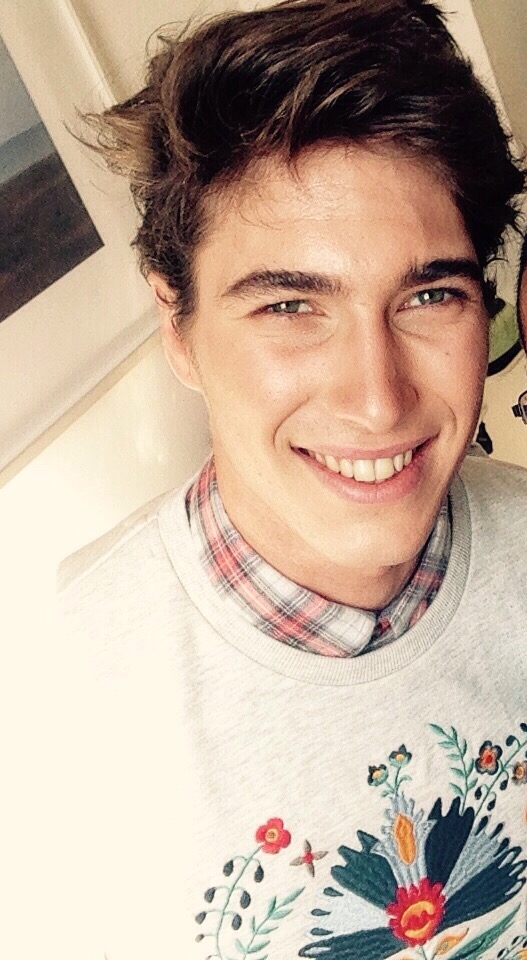
- Born: Isaac Omer Dror; 1 August 1993 (age 33); United States
- Occupations: Actor; model

Omer Dror (Hebrew: עומר דרור; born 1 August 1993) is an Israeli actor and model. He is known to international audiences for his role as Tzachi in The Beauty Queen of Jerusalem which airs on Netflix.

== Early life ==
He was born in 1993 in the United States to Reli (née Abadi) and Erez Dror, before the family returned to Israel in 1994. He was raised in Nili.

His family is Jewish of Polish, Romanian, Syrian, Libyan and Lebanese descent.

He attended high school in Modi'in-Maccabim-Re'ut.

He completed his mandatory military service with the Israel Defense Forces by serving with the Israeli military ensembles.

== Career ==
Early in his career he worked as a model in Milan. In Israel he has appeared in campaigns for Castro and Calvin Klein through the Israeli importers of the brand, Factory 54. In 2024 he appeared in a campaign for Chanel.

He first appeared on screens in 2011, with a role in Alifim.

In 2014 he was cast to play Israeli singer, Mike Brant in a biopic drama film by Eytan Fox. Omer cast by Alain Goldman and Fox who said: “I really believe in Omer. He has a lot in common with Mike Brant. Omer is handsome and tall like Mike, and he has that rare star quality. He is modest and genuine. Although he's young and inexperienced, he's hungry and hard working, and I believe he will surprise the world with this film.” He spent three years preparing for the role, learned French and turned down other roles. However, he revealed in 2025 that the project may not go ahead as Brany's family had not released the film rights over script disagreements.

In 2015 he performed and sang with the Israeli military ensembles at the Festigal festival, alongside Daniel Litman and Yardena Arazi.

In 2017, he starred alongside Noa Kirel in the teen movie, Kimaat Mefursemet (Almost Famous). He later appeared alongside Tzachi Halevy in the 2019 spy comedy, Mossad.

He has also had a number of stage roles. In 2017 he cast as Alan, the younger gay lover of the central character in the Habima Theatre production of the American play, Torch Song Trilogy. He was praised by critics for his performance: "Omer Dror pleasantly surprises in the role of Alan, the model, and proves that he has more to offer than a pretty face and abs" A year later he was cast as a gay combat officer in the musical "My Mika" at the Habima. In 2021 he was cast in a musical adaption by Habonim of the 1964 Israeli comedy, Sallah Shabati.

In 2020, he was cast as Tzachi Toledano in the historical drama series,The Beauty Queen of Jerusalem, one of Israel's largest ever productions.

In 2022, Dror competed in the 8th season of Israel's Rokdim Im Kokhavim ('Dancing with the Stars'), where he was eliminated 6th (out of 15 couples).

In 2024 he began playing the lead role of Peter in a touring stage production of Peter and Wendy alongside Hana Laszlo. In 2025, he began starring a touring national producing of the original Israeli musical, Yasso: My Greek Love.

In 2026, he began starring in the Kan 11 comedy-drama series, Hapshuta.

== Personal life ==
He was in a relationship with the model, Michal Peres for three years between 2017 and 2020. He was later in a relationship with the actress, Naya Federman for two years, between 2021 and 2023. He previously dated the model, Shlomit Malka, who later married the actor, Yehuda Levi.

Since 2024, he has been in a relationship with Or Prianti, a wedding dress designer from Beersheba.

== Filmography ==
Year	Title	Role	Notes
2011	Alifim	Micha	11 episodes
2013–2015	Galis	Erez	11 episodes
2014	Moadon HaChnunum (The Nerd Club)	Tom	1 episode
2017	Anachnu BaMapa	Geva	4 episodes
2017	Kimaat Mefursemet (Almost Famous)	Tomer Carmi	
2018–2020	Kfula	Ben Hamama	Series regular
2018–2022	Malkot (Queens)	Shachaf	
2019	Mossad	Ethan	
2019–2020	The Attaché		Series regular
2021–2022	The Beauty Queen of Jerusalem	Tzachi Toledano	8 episodes
2026-present	Hapshuta	Yiftach	Series regular
