= Mount Meron =

Mountain in the Upper Galilee regions, Israel

- Mount Jarmaq; Jebel Jarmaq
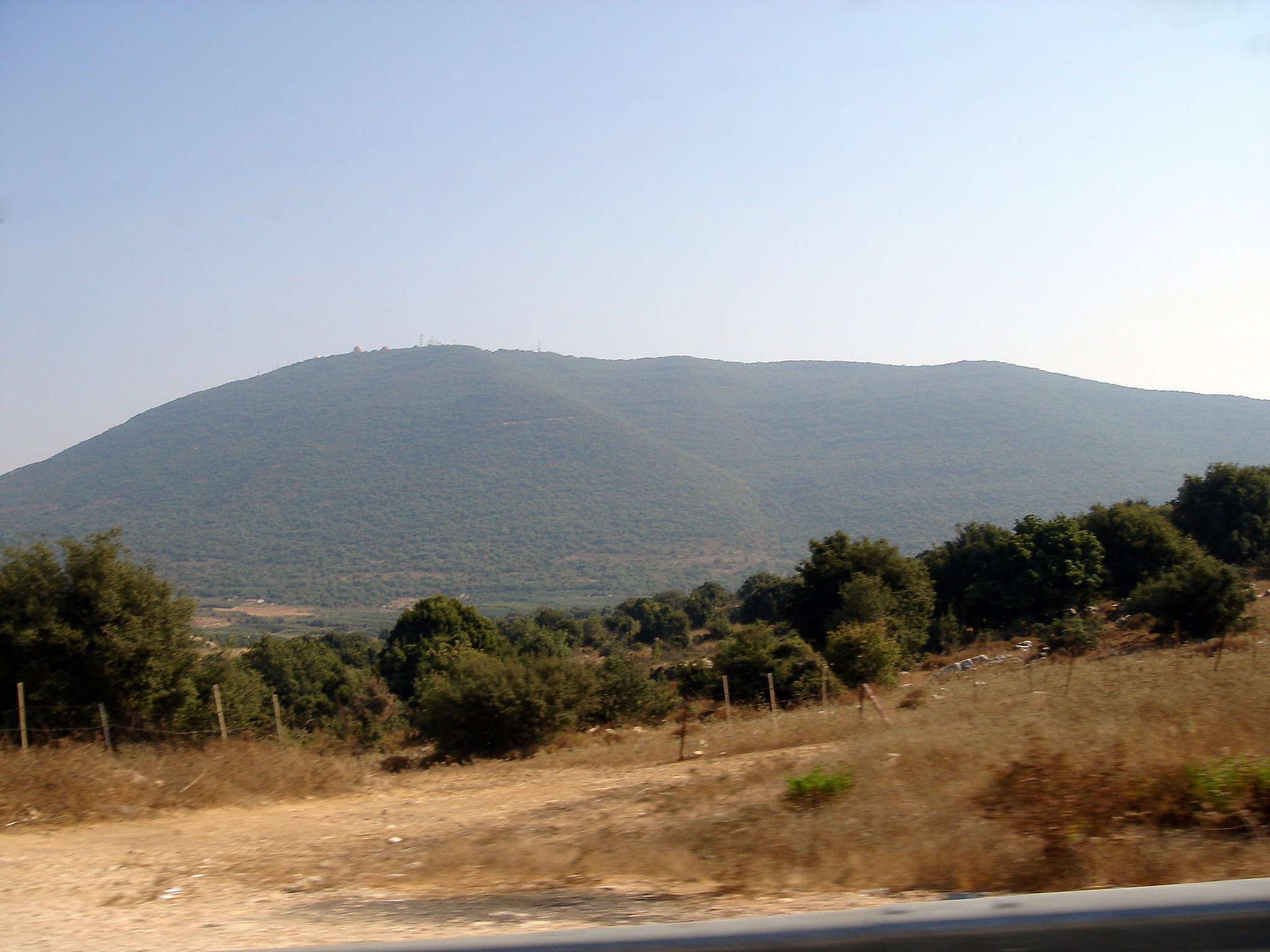
- Northern slopes of Mount Meron

Highest point
- Elevation: 1,204 m (3,950 ft)
- Coordinates: 32°59′52″N 35°24′49″E

Naming
- Native name: הַר מֵירוֹן (Hebrew); جبل الجرمق (Arabic)

Geography
- Location within Israel Location within Northeast Israel
- Location: Israel

Mount Meron (Hebrew: הַר מֵירוֹן, romanized: Har Merón; named after the former village of Meiron), also known as Mount Jarmaq or Jebel Jarmaq (Arabic: جبل الجرمق, romanized: Jabal al-Jarmaq; named after the former village of Jarmaq), is a mountain in the Upper Galilee region of Israel. It has special significance in Jewish religious tradition and parts of it have been declared a nature reserve. At 1,204 metres (3,950 ft) above sea level, Mount Meron is the highest peak in Israel within the Green Line. (Note: Many peaks in the Golan Heights, which were unilaterally annexed by Israel in 1981, are higher, with the highest being Mitzpe Hashlagim (nearby Mount Hermon) at an altitude of 2,236 metres (7,336 ft), but are internationally recognized as part of Syria.) The mountain is a major motif in the art of the artists' quarter of Safed.

== Mount Meron nature reserve ==
In 1965, an 84,000-dunam nature reserve was declared. An additional 1,199 dunams were declared part of the reserve in 2005. It is the highest reserve in Israel, at an altitude of 1,204 meters above sea level, and the largest reserve in the north of the country.

== Religious significance ==
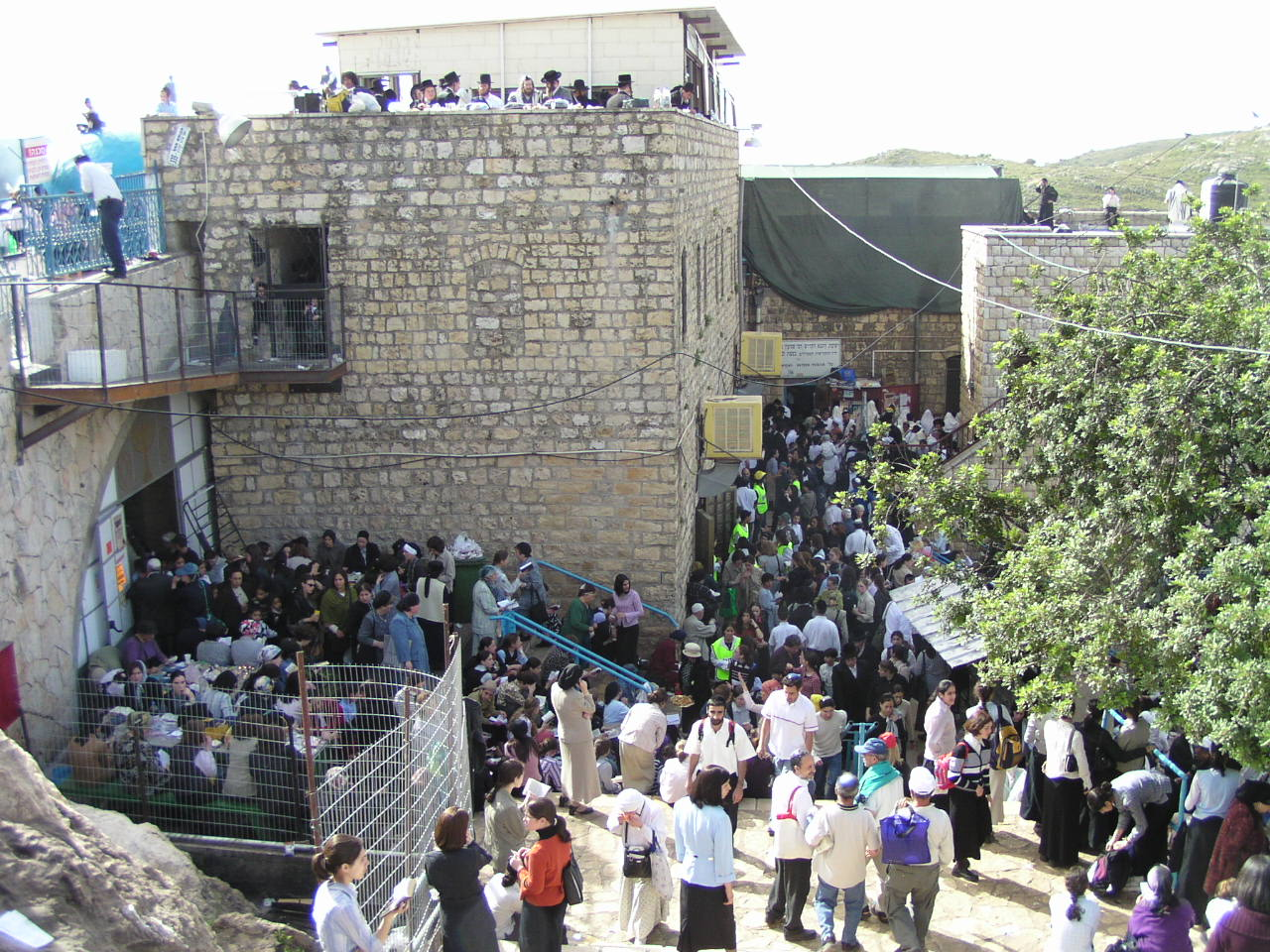
Tomb of Shimon bar Yochai

The village of Meron and the tomb of Rabbi Shimon bar Yochai are on Mount Meron. Leading up to the anniversary of his death on Lag BaOmer, thousands of people camp out along the slopes near the tomb, and on Lag B'Omer itself, hundreds of thousands make pilgrimages to celebrate the occasion.

== Hiking paths ==
In Mount Meron Nature Reserve, there are some 45 hiking trails and routes for visitors to explore. At Mount Meron’s peak, there is a circular walking path, from which visitors can observe panoramic views and see rare vegetation. The Peak Trail surrounds the summit of Mount Meron and includes three lookout points: the Tzfat viewpoint (overlooking the city of Tzfat and the eastern Upper Galilee), the Lebanon viewpoint (looking north into Lebanese territory) and the mountain viewpoint (overlooking the Druze village of Beit Jann, on Mount Peki'in and the western Galilee).

== In art ==
Mount Meron is a subject in Israeli and Jewish art. Gideon Ofrat described how artists such as Isaac Frenkel, Moshe Castel and others would paint scenes described as fiery or serene, with a particular focus on sunsets over Mount Meron as seen from afar in the city of Safed where an artists' quarter sat.

== Climate ==
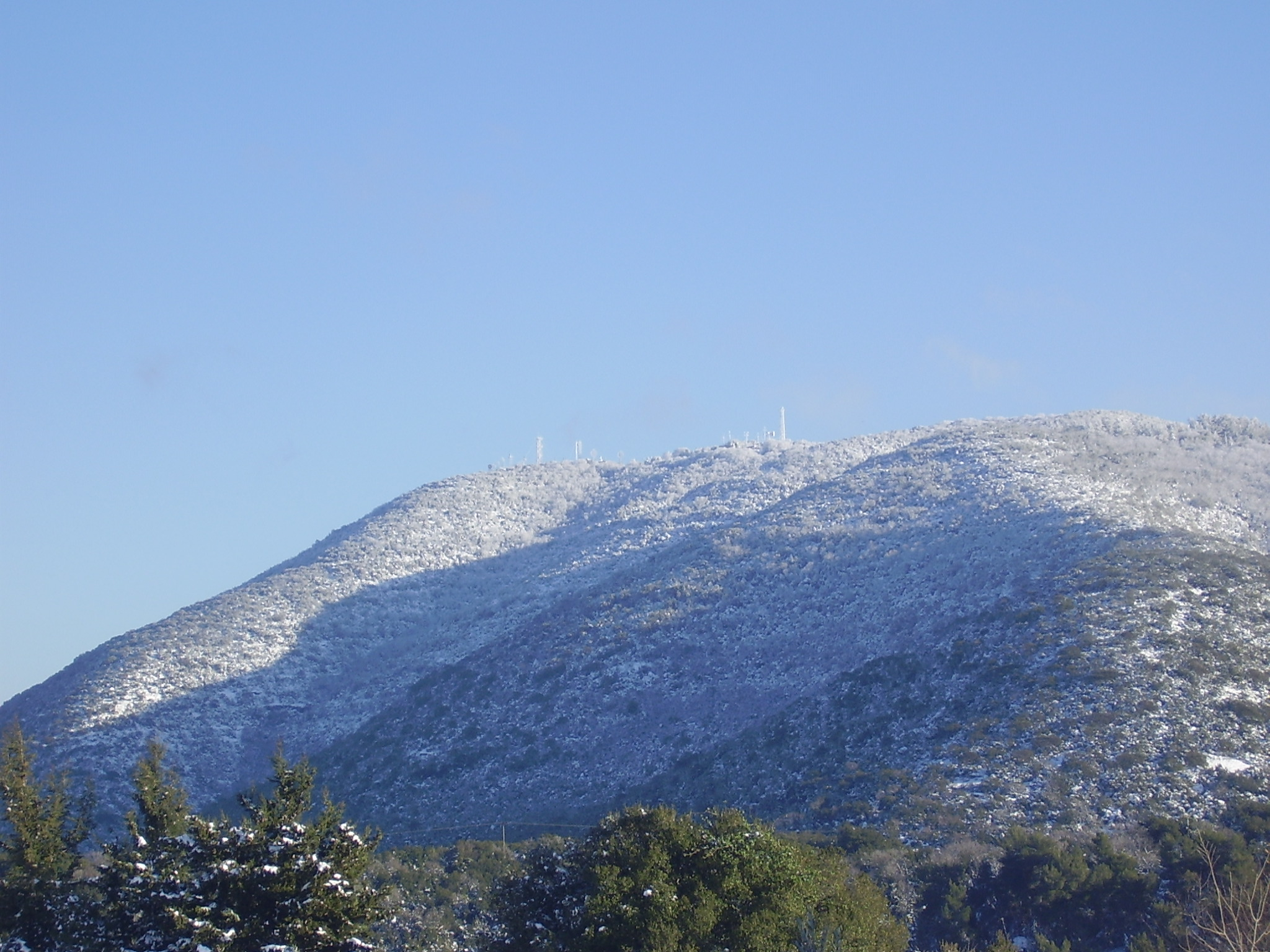
Snowfall on Mount Meron

Despite its high altitude, Mount Meron has a hot-summer mediterranean climate (Köppen climate classification: Csa) with hot and dry summers and cool, wet and occasionally snowy winters. It snows briefly on Mount Meron a few times during the winter. There are 22 days a year with a temperature of 32 °C or higher and 28 days below freezing. Mount Meron has a relatively cooler climate with high annual precipitation; and has the second highest precipitation in Israel after Mount Hermon.

Note: the chart is an average of five years so the record highs and lows may not be fully accurate.

Climate data for Mount Meron (2002–2007)
| Month | Jan | Feb | Mar | Apr | May | Jun | Jul | Aug | Sep | Oct | Nov | Dec | Year |
|---|---|---|---|---|---|---|---|---|---|---|---|---|---|
| Record high °C (°F) | 17 (63) | 22 (72) | 18 (64) | 26 (79) | 32 (90) | 32 (90) | 33 (91) | 36 (97) | 33 (91) | 28 (82) | 26 (79) | 20 (68) | 36 (97) |
| Mean daily maximum °C (°F) | 8 (46) | 9 (48) | 11 (52) | 18 (64) | 23 (73) | 27 (81) | 29 (84) | 30 (86) | 27 (81) | 26 (79) | 20 (68) | 12 (54) | 20 (68) |
| Daily mean °C (°F) | 6 (43) | 6 (43) | 7 (45) | 13 (55) | 18 (64) | 21 (70) | 23 (73) | 24 (75) | 21 (70) | 20 (68) | 16 (61) | 9 (48) | 15 (59) |
| Mean daily minimum °C (°F) | 4 (39) | 3 (37) | 4 (39) | 8 (46) | 13 (55) | 15 (59) | 17 (63) | 18 (64) | 16 (61) | 15 (59) | 12 (54) | 6 (43) | 11 (52) |
| Record low °C (°F) | −2 (28) | −8 (18) | — | 3 (37) | 7 (45) | 11 (52) | 15 (59) | 13 (55) | 13 (55) | 11 (52) | 5 (41) | — | −8 (18) |
| Average precipitation mm (inches) | 70 (2.8) | 190 (7.5) | 270 (10.6) | 60 (2.4) | 80 (3.1) | 180 (7.1) | — | — | — | — | 20 (0.8) | 240 (9.4) | 1,150 (45.3) |
| Average precipitation days | 5 | 10 | 8 | 4 | 5 | 10 | — | — | — | — | 1 | 10 | 56 |
| Average relative humidity (%) | 75 | 72 | 68 | 55 | 45 | 45 | 46 | 49 | 52 | 50 | 56 | 72 | 57 |
Source: "Climate Information for Har Meron, Israel". Weather Base.

== Incidents ==
On May 17, 1911, the collapse of an eight-meter high roof caused 40 wounded and seven fatalities. As the nearby hospital was closed, people from the surrounding area donated bedsheets and equipment to assist the wounded.

At about 12:50 a.m. on April 30, 2021, hundreds of Israelis were trampled as they were leaving the mountain, having attended a Lag BaOmer celebration that drew an estimated 100,000 people in spite of a 10,000-people limit imposed due to the COVID-19 pandemic. At least 45 people died in the disaster, with hundreds injured.
