= New Lebanon =

New Lebanon is the name of several towns in the United States:

- New Lebanon, Indiana
- New Lebanon, Missouri
- New Lebanon, New York
- New Lebanon, Ohio
- New Lebanon, Pennsylvania
