= West Lebanon =

West Lebanon may refer to:

- West Lebanon, Indiana, United States
- West Lebanon Historic District, in West Lebanon village in Lebanon, Maine
- West Lebanon, New Hampshire, United States
- West Lebanon, Ohio, an unincorporated community
- West Lebanon, Pennsylvania, United States
- West Lebanon Township, Pennsylvania, in Lebanon County
