= Lebanon Airport =

Lebanon Airport may refer to:

- Lebanon Municipal Airport (New Hampshire) in Lebanon, New Hampshire, United States (FAA/IATA: LEB)
- Lebanon Municipal Airport (Tennessee) in Lebanon, Tennessee, United States (FAA: M54)
- Lebanon State Airport in Lebanon, Oregon, United States (FAA: S30)
- Lebanon-Warren County Airport in Lebanon, Ohio, United States (FAA: I68)
- Floyd W. Jones Lebanon Airport in Lebanon, Missouri, United States (FAA: LBO)

Airports in places named Lebanon:

- Beirut–Rafic Hariri International Airport in Beirut, Lebanon
- Boone County Airport (Arkansas) in Lebanon, Indiana, United States (FAA: 6I4)
- Keller Brothers Airport in Lebanon, Pennsylvania, United States (FAA: 08N)
