= North Lebanon Township =

North Lebanon Township may refer to:

- North Lebanon Township, Sharp County, Arkansas, in Sharp County, Arkansas
- North Lebanon Township, Pennsylvania
