= Mount Lebanon (disambiguation) =

Mount Lebanon is a mountain range in the Lebanese Republic, a nation in the Middle East.

Mount Lebanon may also refer to:

- Mount Lebanon Governorate, a political region in modern Lebanon
- Mount Lebanon Mutasarrifate, one of the former Ottoman Empire's subdivisions
- Mount Lebanon Emirate

== United States ==
- Mount Lebanon, a spur peak of Holy Mount, located in western Massachusetts
- Mount Lebanon, Louisiana, a town
- Mount Lebanon (Montana), a mountain
- Mount Lebanon, New Jersey, an unincorporated community
- Mt. Lebanon, Pennsylvania, a suburb of Pittsburgh
- Mount Lebanon Shaker Society in New Lebanon, New York
