= Moshe Castel =

Israeli painter and pioneer of Volcanic ash art (1909–1991)

Moshe Castel משה קסטל
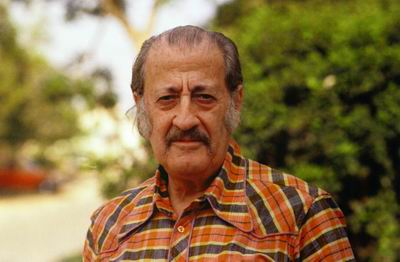
- Born: 1909; Jerusalem, Ottoman Empire
- Died: December 12, 1991 (aged 81–82)
- Education: Yitzhak Frenkel's Histadrut Art Studio, Bezalel Academy of Arts and Design, Académie Julian, Ecole du Louvre
- Known for: Painting, sculpture, use of Volcanic rock and ash
- Movement: School of Paris

Moshe Castel (Hebrew: משה קסטל; 1909 – December 12, 1991) was an Israeli painter.

== Biography ==
Moshe Elazar Castel born in Jerusalem, Ottoman Palestine, in 1909, to Rabbi Yehuda Castel and his wife Rachel. The family was descended from the Jewish Castel clan, who are Sephardic Jews from Castile who according to oral tradition, immigrated to the city of Gaza after the expulsion of the Jews from Spain in 1492, and later relocated to Hebron in the early modern period. His father was born in Hebron. He opened religious schools for Sephardi boys in the Nahalat Shiv'a and Bukharim quarters of Jerusalem. Moshe grew up in the Bukharim neighborhood, where he attended his father's school. At the age of 13, he was accepted to the Bezalel Art School, directed by Boris Schatz, where he studied from 1921 to 1925.

During the weekends of 1925-1927 he would study under Yitzhak Frenkel (a painter of the Ecole de Paris) at his studio in Tel Aviv, where he encountered the influence of modern French art. His teacher, Shmuel Ben David, encouraged him to study art in Paris.

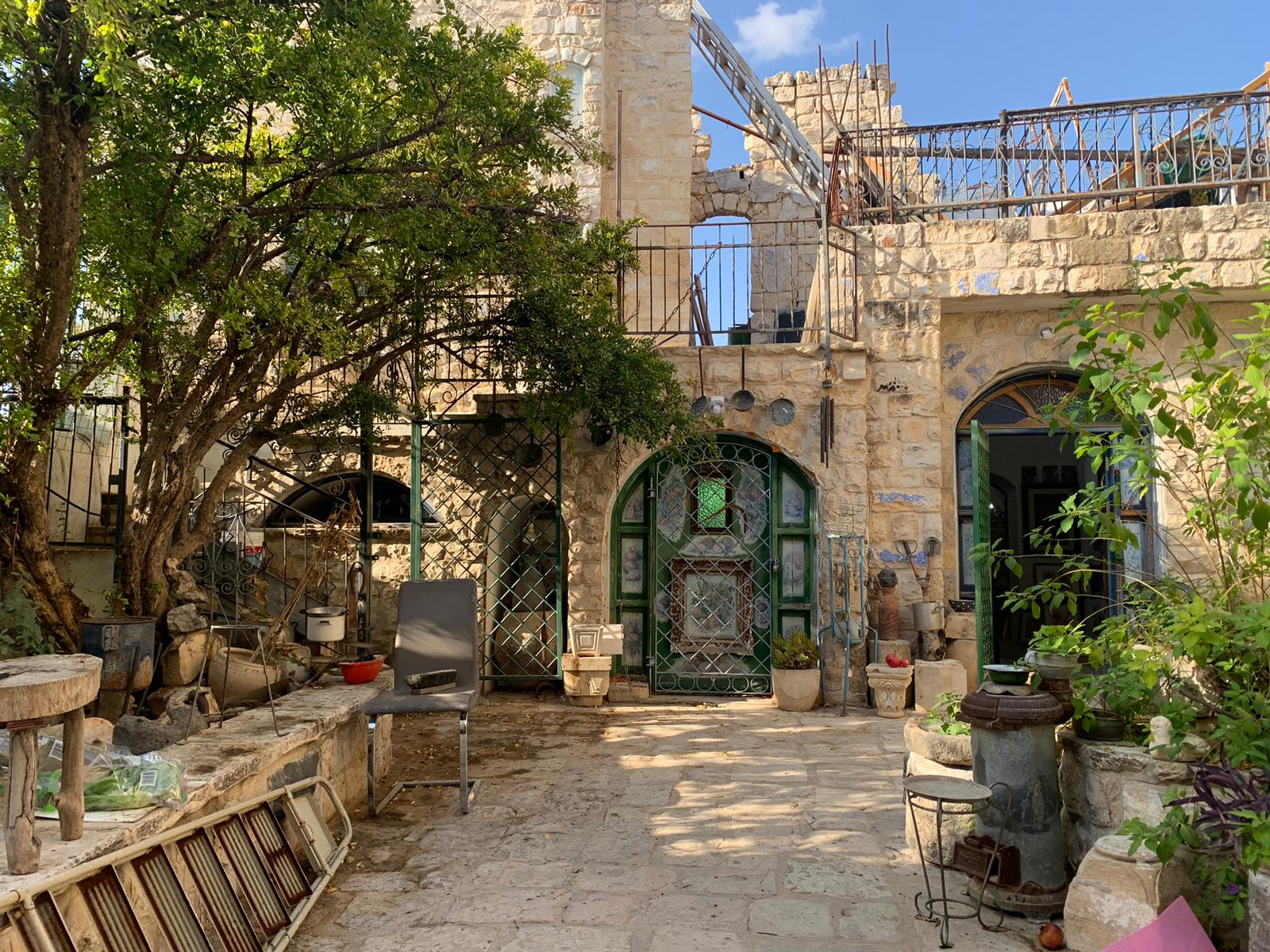
Beit Castel, the artists' residence in the artists quarter of Safed, now a gallery.

Castel traveled to Paris in 1927, where he attended Académie Julian and Ecole du Louvre. He sat in the Louvre copying the works of Rembrandt, Velasquez, Delacroix and Courbet, intrigued by their paint-layering techniques. It was here that he began to realize that "art is not symbolic, but rather material, the material is the main thing, the way the paint is placed, the way the layers are placed on the picture, this is the most essential thing."

In May 1927, the World Union of Hebrew Youth in Paris sponsored his first exhibit. Ze'ev Jabotinsky, who was in Paris at the time, wrote an introduction for the catalogue.

In 1940, Castel returned to Palestine and settled in Safed (today his home houses the Beit Castel art gallery). In 1949, Castel married Bilhah (née Bauman), an actress.

== Artistic career ==
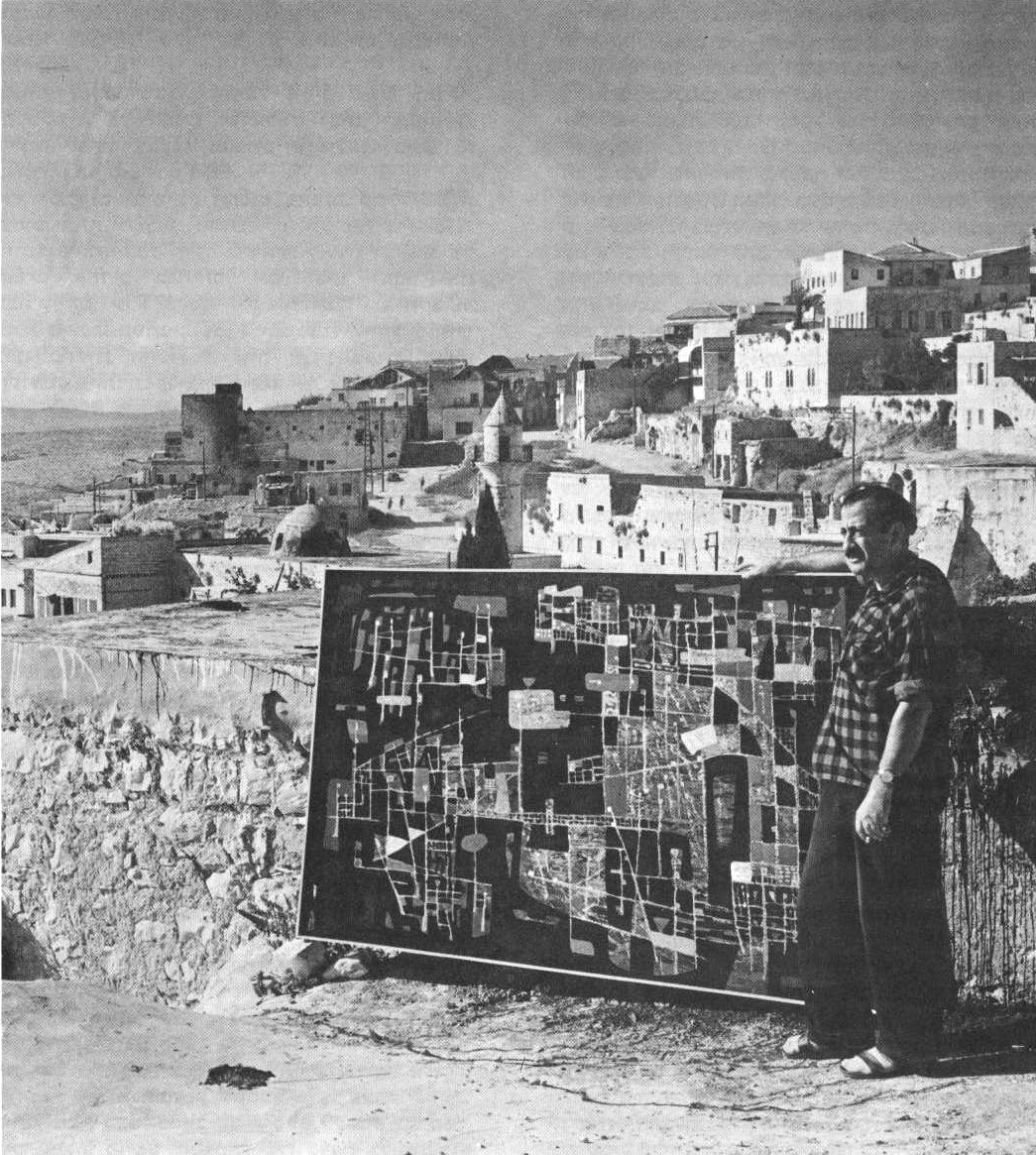
Moshe Castel, in the artists quarter of Safed, with his painting "Zohar", 1956.

Moshe Castel was influenced by his teacher Yitzhak Frenkel, adopting the modern French style of the School of Paris and travelling to France during the 1920s. In 1947, Castel rebelled against Frenkel's influence helping found the "New Horizons" (Ofakim Hadashim) group together with several other of Frenkel's former pupils including Yehezkel Streichman and Avigdor Stematsky as well as the artists Yosef Zaritsky, Marcel Janco and others. In 1959, he purchased a studio in Montparnasse where he worked for several months a year. In 1955, a solo exhibition of his works was mounted at the Tel Aviv Museum of Art. His murals hang in the Knesset, Binyanei HaUma Convention Center, Rockefeller Center in New York, and the official residence of the President of Israel in Jerusalem.

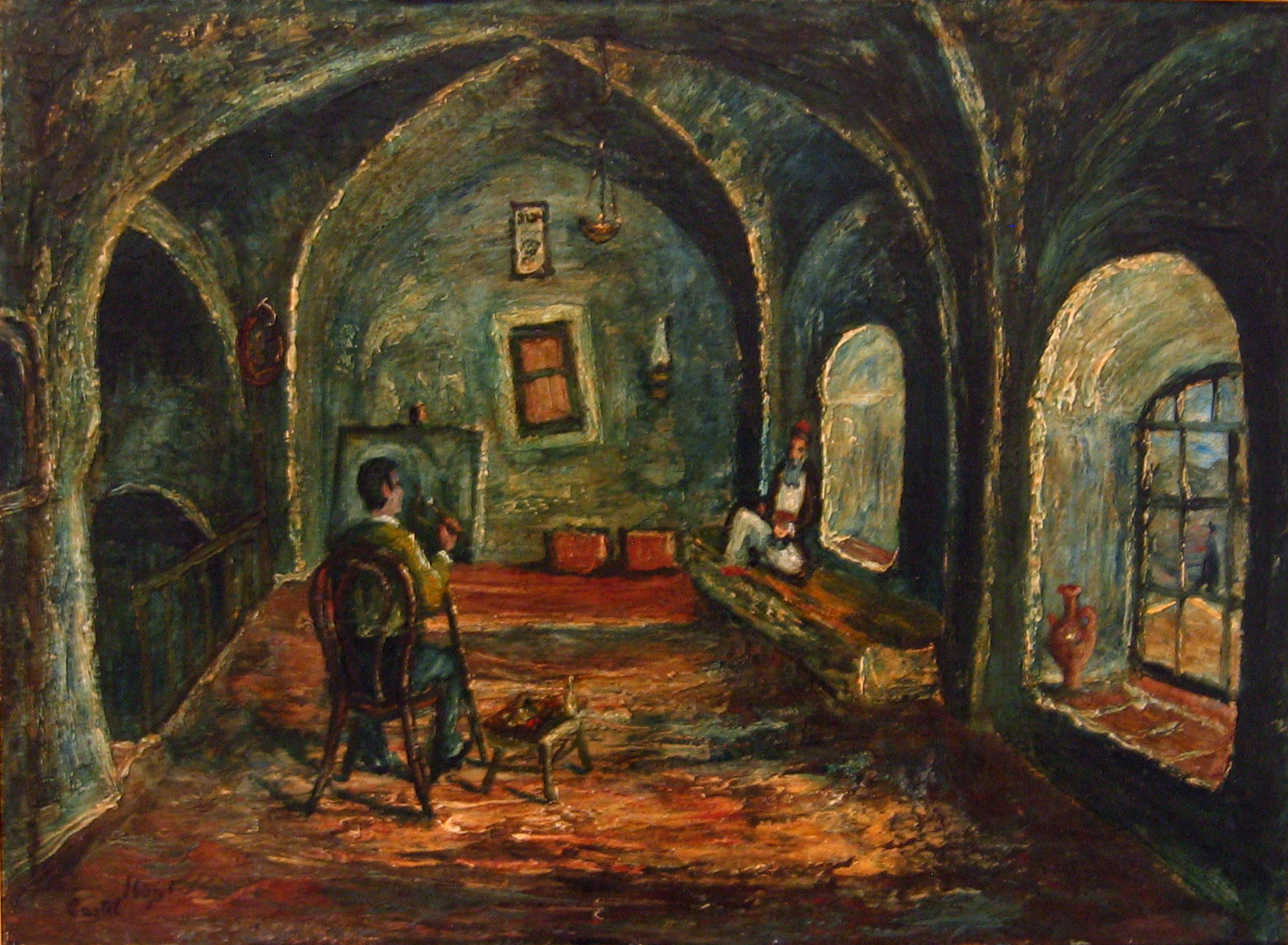
Castel in his Safed studio, 1940

== Style ==
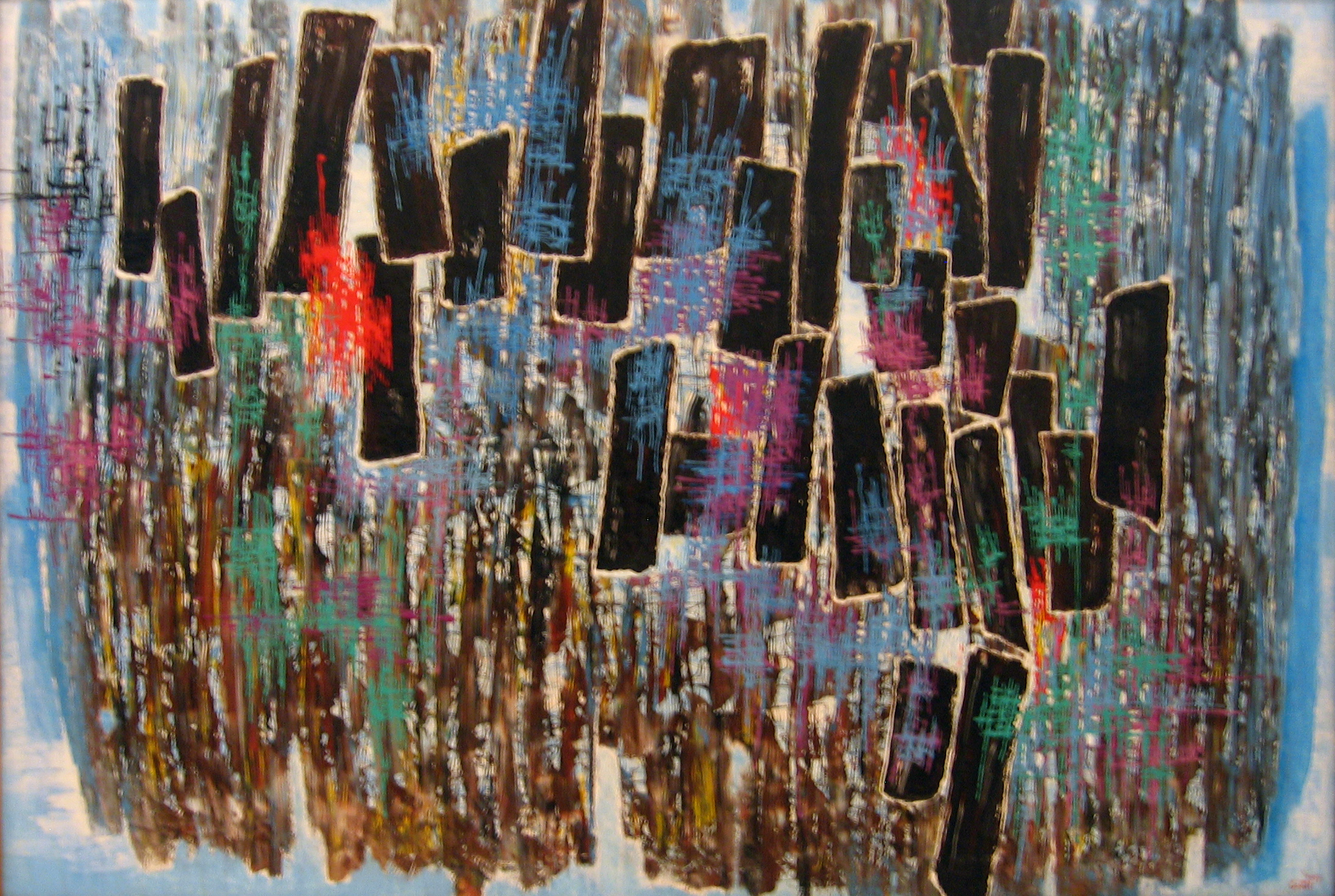
Halleluya, 1958

In the 1930s and 1940s, many of Castel's paintings depicted the lives of Sephardic Jews in the Holy Land, revealing the influence of Persian miniatures. From the 1950s on, Castel created relief paintings inspired by the "ancient predecessors of Hebrew civilization." In 1948, he visited the ruins of an ancient synagogue in Korazin, an ancient Jewish town in the Galilee. Inspired by the basalt blocks he saw there, engraved with images and ornaments, he began to use ground basalt, which he molded into shapes, as his basic material. The technique utilized ground basalt rock mixed with sand and glue, infused with the rich colors that became his trademark. The works were embellished with archaic forms derived from ancient script, symbolism and mythological signs from Hebrew and Sumerian culture. As a member of the New Horizons group, he combined elements of abstract European art with Eastern motifs and "Canaanite art."

== Awards and commemoration ==
=== Legacy ===
His art can today be found in several public collections including the Tate gallery in London, the Museum of Modern art in New York, in the Vatican, in the San Francisco Museum of art as well as in the Israeli parliament, supreme court and Israeli presidential residence. His museum in summer of 2024 showcased an exhibition of 74 artists including Naftali Bezem, Yosef Ostrovsky and Yitzhak Alexander Frenkel (Frenel).

=== Awards ===
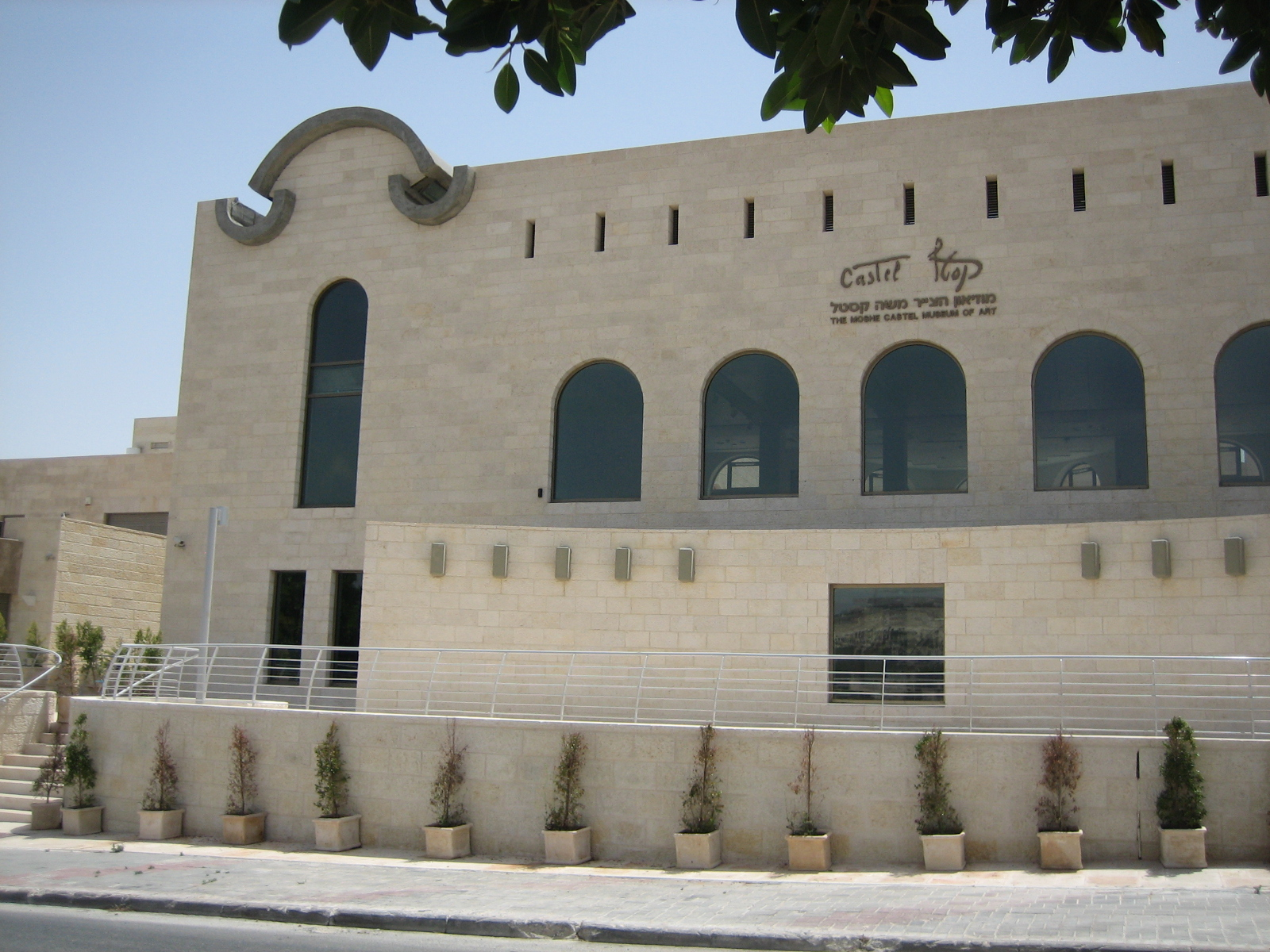
Moshe Castel Museum

- In 1941 and again in 1946, Castel was awarded the Dizengoff Prize for painting by the Tel Aviv Municipality.
- He won the "Premier do Estado" prize at the São Paulo Art Biennial in Brazil.
- The Moshe Castel Museum of Art, in a building designed by Israeli architect David Resnik overlooking the desert landscape, opened in Ma'aleh Adumim in 2010.

== See also ==
- Visual arts in Israel
- Yitzhak Frenkel Frenel
- Shimshon Holzman
- Safed
