= Lebanon Township =

Lebanon Township may refer to:

== Illinois ==
- Lebanon Township, St. Clair County, Illinois

== Michigan ==
- Lebanon Township, Michigan

== Minnesota ==
- Lebanon Township, Minnesota, now the city of Apple Valley

== Missouri ==
- Lebanon Township, Cooper County, Missouri
- Lebanon Township, Laclede County, Missouri

== New Jersey ==
- Lebanon Township, New Jersey

== North Carolina ==
- Lebanon Township, Durham County, North Carolina

== North Dakota ==
- Lebanon Township, McHenry County, North Dakota, in McHenry County, North Dakota

== Ohio ==
- Lebanon Township, Meigs County, Ohio

== Pennsylvania ==
- Lebanon Township, Pennsylvania
- North Lebanon Township, Pennsylvania
- South Lebanon Township, Pennsylvania
- West Lebanon Township, Pennsylvania
- Mount Lebanon Township, Pennsylvania
