= Shimshon Holzman =

Israeli artist

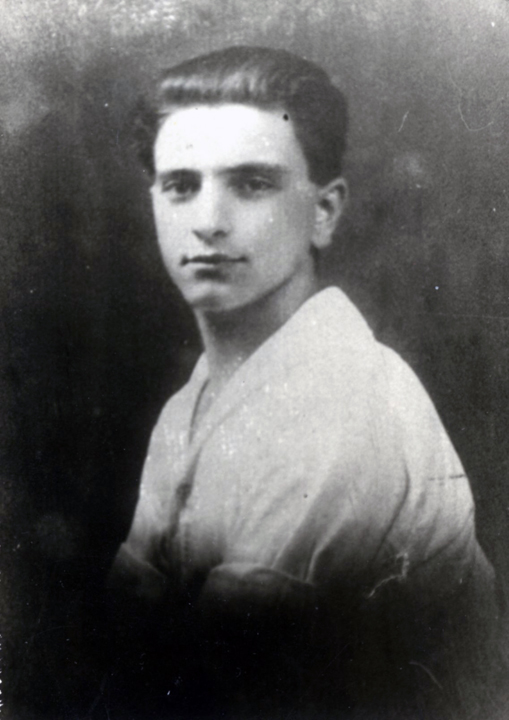
- Born: 1907; Sambir, Galicia
- Died: 1986 (aged 78–79); Tel Aviv
- Education: Yitzhak Frenkel's Histadrut Art Studio 1926-1929 Académie de la Grande Chaumière 1929-?
- Known for: Water colours
- Style: Abstract, Expressionism, Fauvism
- Movement: School of Paris
- Awards: Dizengoff Prize

Shimshon Holzman (variant name: Shimson Holzman; Hebrew: שמשון הולצמן; 1907–1986) was an Israeli landscape and figurative painter. He is known worldwide for his watercolor paintings.

== Background ==
Holzman was born in 1907, in Sambir, Galicia. He immigrated to Mandate Palestine from Vienna, Austria in 1922, settled in Tel Aviv, and began working as a house painter with his father. In 1926, Holzman began private studies under Yitzhak Frenkel at the studio of painting arts of the Histadrut School where he also worked with Mordechai Levanon, Ziona Tajar, Avigdor Stematsky, Yehezkel Streichman, Moshe Castel, and Arie Aroch.

In 1929, he made his first of several influential visits to Paris, France. There, he studied at the Académie de la Grande Chaumière and exhibited frequently. Israeli art scholar Gideon Ofrat writes of Holzman's time in France: he "brought from Paris impeccably French interiors and landscapes in expressionistic oils, but replaced them with lighthearted aquarelles in the manner of Raoul Dufy and Henri Matisse." As a result of his studies under Frenkel - himself heavily influenced by the École de Paris - and lengthy stays in France, Holzman's oeuvre has a strong French undercurrent. He was deeply influenced by Matisse, and his colour palette evinces a marked Fauvist imprint. Gideon Ofrat further explains: "Holzman's landscapes (Galilean in the main) and characters (mostly Oriental) would convey optimism and mischievous gaiety; his sketch line, designed for a temperamentally rhythmic role, was overlaid with splotches of color, abstract and charmingly translucent."

Furthermore it has been noted that Holzman appears to have also been influenced by the art of the Far East, an influence present in several of his works.

Holzman was a founding member of the Artists' Quarter in Safed, represented Israel at the 1959 Venice Biennale, and participated in a group exhibition of Israeli artists at the opening of the Tel Aviv Museum of Art in 1932.

Holzman is considered a modern master of the watercolour medium. On the tradition of watercolour painting in Israel, Avishay Ayal of the University of Haifa explains: "originating in the early 15th century, this technique was a means for rapid sketching… In pre-State Palestine and in the early days of the State of Israel, aquarelle painting was a cheap and rapid method to disseminate art. Given the poverty that characterized the entire period, painting in watercolour and purchasing works on paper became a cheap, available option… Many of the Israeli abstract artists were great experts in watercolour painting." Ayal writes further: "several artists became known at the time mainly as aquarellists, and their works were highly popular during that period. The paintings of Joseph Kossonogi, Mordechai Avniel, and Shimshon Holzman are full of momentum, the color flows within extensive water stains, and they represent the spirit of an era rich in practice that looks to the future with optimism."

Holzman's orientalist-inspired works depicting Israeli land and seascapes and Bedouin, Arab, and Jewish life are highlights of mid-twentieth century Israeli painting.

He died in Tel Aviv in 1986.

== Awards ==
In 1937, Holzman was a co-recipient of the first Dizengoff Prize, Israel's highest honour for contributions to the Arts. Holzman won the Haifa Municipality Prize in 1948 and was awarded the Dizengoff Prize a second time in 1959.

== Selected exhibitions ==
- 2004: University of Haifa Art Gallery, Haifa: Our Landscape: Notes on Landscape Painting in Israel (online catalogue)
- 1991: The Open Museum, Tefen: A Summer Celebration: Paintings of the Israeli Landscape Artist Shimshon Holzman
- 1964: Galerie Jacques Chalom, Paris: Figures & Landscapes of the Galilee
- 1963: Temple Sinai, Washington: Seven Painters of Israel: Ardon, Castel, Holzman, Mokady, Rubin, Shemi & Steinhardt
- 1954: Obelisk Gallery, Washington
- 1951: Galerie Léon Marseille, Paris: Holzman: Paysages d'Israël

== Selected collections ==
- Israel Museum, Jerusalem
- Tel Aviv Museum of Art

== See also ==
- Yitzhak Frenkel Frenel
- Moshe Castel
- Mordechai Levanon
- Arieh Aroch
- School Of Paris
- Safed
