= Frenkel Frenel Museum =

Art museum in Safed, Israel

Coordinates: 33°N 35.5°E

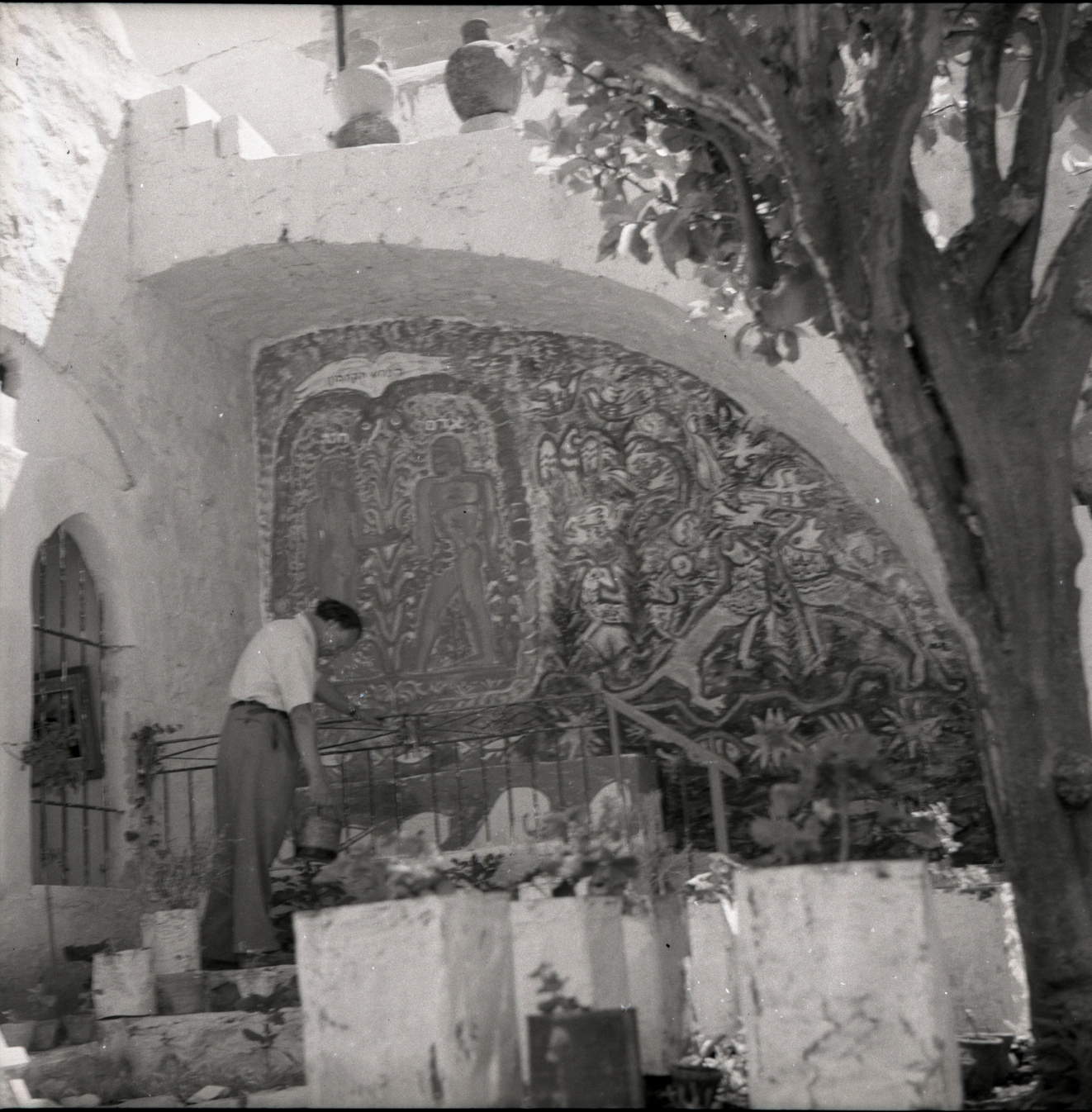
- Established: 1973
- Location: Safed, Tet Zayn Street
- Type: Art
- Website: www.frenkel-frenel.org/The_official_Isaac_Frenkel-Frenel_web_site/Welcome.html

Frenkel Frenel Museum is an art museum in the northern Israeli city of Safed. It was also known as Frenkel's Castle in the press.

== History ==
The museum is in the former home of Franco-Israeli international artist Yitzhak Frenkel. It was opened in 1973 by Frenkel and his fourth wife, Ilana. The Museum exhibits works of the Israeli artist. It is the sole museum dedicated entirely to Frenkel Frenel.

The building was used as an academy of art in the early 1950s. Frenkel ran and taught in the school. However, in 1954 he left Safed for Paris (for 6 years). In 1973 the building opened to the public as a museum exhibiting Frenkel's work from the 1920s up to the 1970s. The museum continued after Frenkel Frenel's death in 1981.

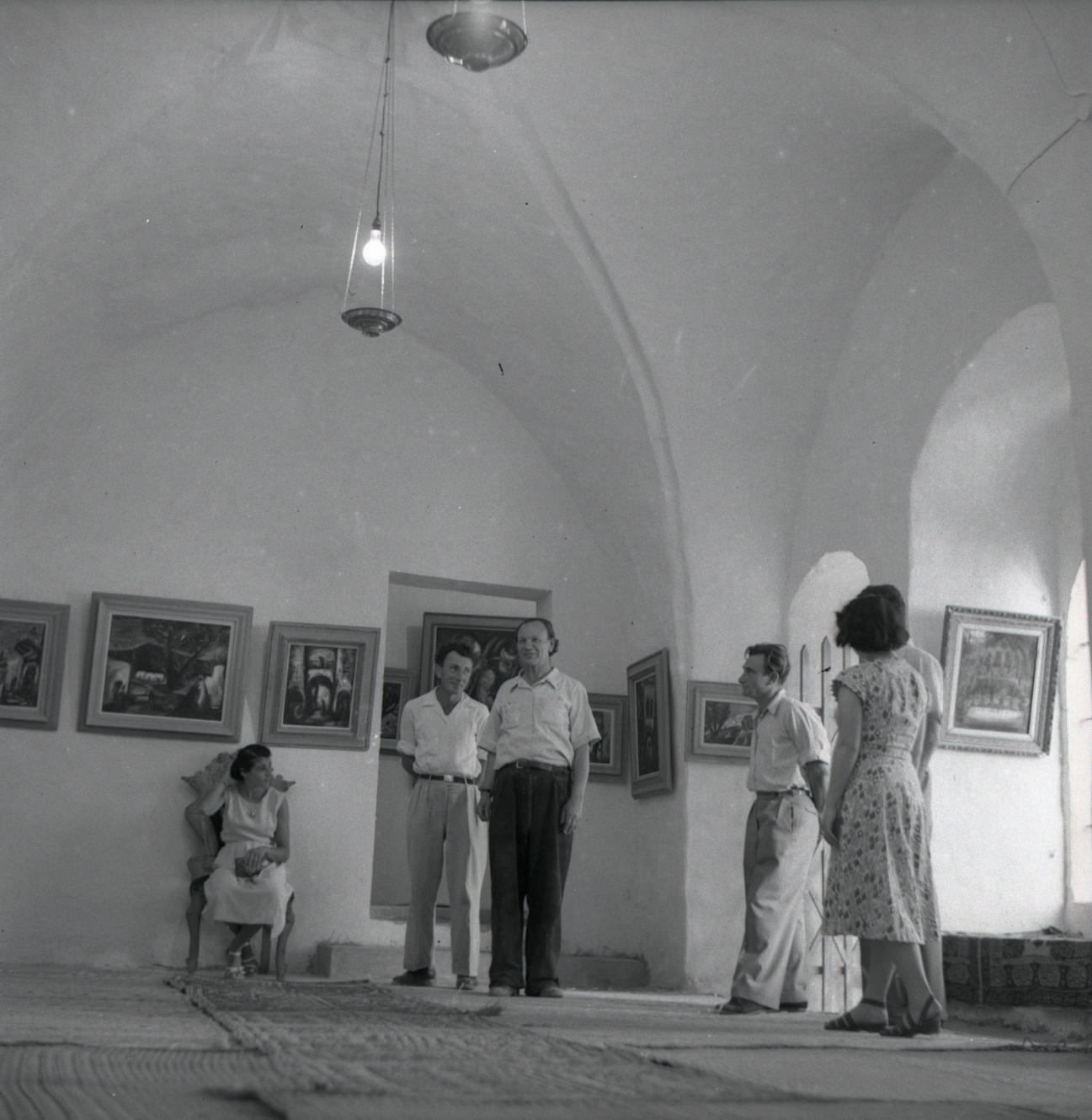
Yitzhak Frenkel inside the building

Frenkel Frenel was schooled in Odesa in his teens and then in the École des Beaux-Arts and at the Académie de la Grande Chaumière durings his 20s. Returning to Mandatory Palestine in the 1920s, he introduced modern French influenced art and techniques, thus revolutionizing art in Palestine. Frenkel was one of the first artists to settle in Safed. He was one of the founders of the artists' colony in Safed.

The museum is composed of a large courtyard. The walls of the courtyard were once covered with frescos and reliefs by Frenkel. However, only one relief has survived to the present day. The building which houses the art surrounds the Western and Northern section of the courtyard. The local architecture is evident in the entirety of the complex.

The museum hosts a variety of artworks by Frenel. The earliest from the 1920s up until the artist's very last weeks in 1981. The museum's collection is composed of a wide range of styles. From abstract and cubist art from the 1920s to vivid expressionism from the 1970s. The collection also includes sketches of costumes, theater sets and exhibition posters.

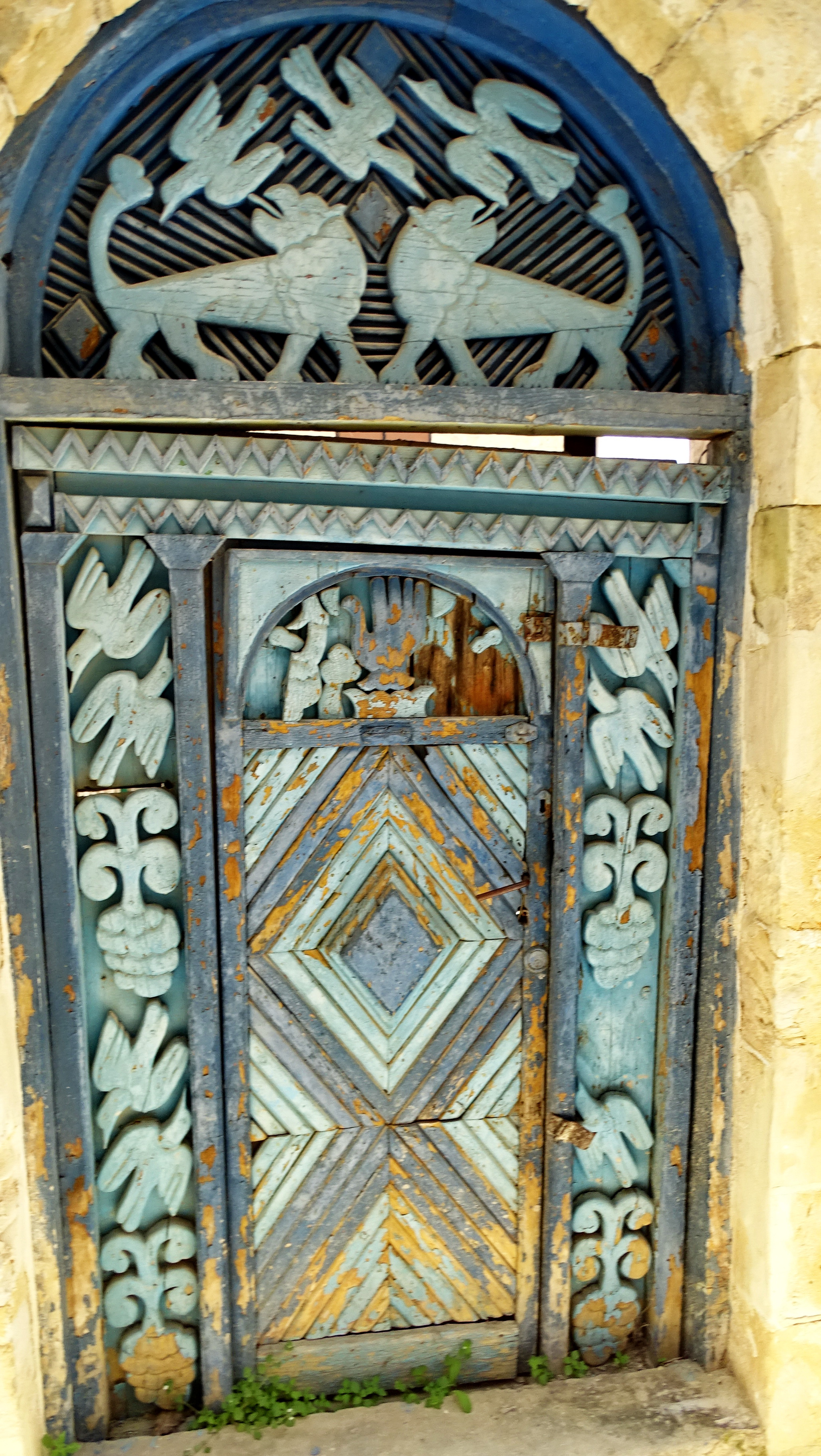
A door made by Frenkel in the Museum

== See also ==
- Beit Castel
